= Prosecution of Ottoman war criminals after World War I =

Attempts to try war criminals following World War I

After World War I, the effort to prosecute Ottoman war criminals was an international project taken up by the Allies and various Ottoman governments.

The Ottoman government organized its own series of courts martial in 1919–1920 to prosecute war criminals, but these failed on account of political pressure. The main effort by the Allied administration that occupied Constantinople fell short of establishing an international tribunal in Malta to try the so-called Malta exiles, Ottoman war criminals held as POWs by the British forces in Malta. In the end, no tribunals were held in Malta.

Taner Akçam states that protecting war criminals from prosecution became a key priority of the Turkish nationalist movement. According to European Court of Human Rights judge Giovanni Bonello the suspension of prosecutions, the repatriation, and release of Turkish detainees was amongst others a result of the lack of an appropriate legal framework with supranational jurisdiction, because following World War I no international norms for regulating war crimes existed. The release of the Turkish detainees was accomplished in exchange for 22 British prisoners held by the Turkish nationalists.

Since there were no international laws in place under which they could be tried, the men who orchestrated the Armenian genocide escaped prosecution and traveled relatively freely throughout Germany, Italy, and Central Asia. This led to the formation of Operation Nemesis, a covert vigilante operation conducted by ARF during which Ottoman political and military figures who fled prosecution were assassinated for their role in the Armenian genocide.

== Background ==
=== State of international law ===
Following the reportage by Henry Morgenthau, Sr., US Ambassador to the Ottoman Empire, of the Armenian resistance during the Armenian genocide at the city of Van, the Triple Entente formally warned the Ottoman Empire on 24 May 1915 that:

In the view of these ... crimes of Turkey against humanity and civilization ... the Allied governments announce publicly ... that they will hold personally responsible ... all members of the Ottoman Government and those of their agents who are implicated in such massacres.

The Allies warning to prosecute Ottoman commanders of crimes against humanity was the first time such a legal framework was articulated. They were to face criminal prosecution of participating in such acts, regardless of rank or authority. This principle later formed the legal framework of the 1946 Nuremberg trials against German war criminals, and became enshrined in international law in the United Nations' Convention on the Prevention and Punishment of the Crime of genocide. Previous international law: e.g. Hague I or Hague II, made no provision regarding an army against its own people. In fact, the Hague conventions provided the legality for the right of reprisal, which was invoked to justify repression and maintenance of sovereignty in colonial empires. Especially lacking were principles to hold politicians responsible to military operations they did not have a direct role in. The events of World War I brought to light new discussions over international law in the Paris Peace Conference: codifying a state's duty to protect its own citizens, and also other states' citizens.

The Ottoman Empire was party to the 1856 Treaty of Paris, which attached the state to the Concert of Europe and international law, and both Hague Conventions. It also was bound to guarantee Armenian security and prosperity through the 1878 Treaty of Berlin and the 1914 Treaty of Yeniköy. Over the course of World War I, the CUP governments withdrew from Yeniköy, Paris, Berlin, the capitulations, as well as the 1871 Treaty of London, which stipulated that powers could not unilaterally withdraw from previously established treaties. Withdrawing from these treaties liberated the empire from what the Unionists thought to be a tyrannical diplomatic regime that only legitimized Western intervention and imperialism in the Ottoman Empire.

The efforts to prosecute Ottoman war criminals was simultaneous with efforts to prosecute German war criminals; there were plans to try Kaiser Wilhelm II before an international tribunal. Early on however, Allied international legal experts concluded that charges against Wilhelm for perpetrating wars of aggression and violations of sovereignty were not considered crimes under international law, in addition to his own political immunity and as citizen of a sovereign country. Also challenging for legal theorists was the potential application laws ex post facto, should the path of a new framework for international law be taken.

=== Debates over victimhood and responsibility ===
The Ottoman Chamber of Deputies, elected in the winter of 1913-1914, was controlled by the CUP and the Unionist president Halil Menteşe throughout the war. During that time it served as a rubber stamp for its Central Committee, so debate over conduct of the war was at a minimum. The fallout of the Armistice of Mudros broke the Chamber's seal of silence, prompting deputies to seek clarity on the government's actions relating to the war. In a dramatic legislative session on 4 November 1918, Emmanouil Emmanouilidis delivered a speech asserting government policy in the war resulted in the murder and expulsion of up to 2 million Greeks and Armenians, that CUP leaders benefited from confiscated Armenian property, and the Ottoman Empire joined the Great War without justification. He held those responsible and deserved punishment to be Talât and his CUP comrades. The Greek and Armenian deputies inquired the scope and abuses of the Temporary Law of Deportation -the Tehcir Law. Turkish CUP deputies evaded accusations claiming casualty figures were exaggerated, Turks also suffering from war time conditions too, and insufficient loyalty of Ottoman Armenians: some Ottoman Armenians joined the Russian army and participated in the Lake Van massacre of Muslims.

In future sessions of parliament, talk of war crimes often turned into heated arguments between Greek and Armenian MPs and Turkish MPs. Some MPs asserted it was not mere individuals but an entire political movement responsible, and that the entire Turkish nation bore collective responsibility for supporting the CUP, which drew harsh responses from Turkish deputies. A government official declared to the deputies that without proof further discussion over the issue would serve no purpose than divisiveness in the Chamber, therefore the official government position to deny culpability would be continue. On 21 December Sultan Mehmed VI dissolved the Chamber of Deputies.

== Investigations ==
The government established several commissions of inquiry to examine the CUP cabinets' actions. Motivating them was not only to understand the actions of the government since 1914, which was opaque even to most of the cabinet, but punishing war criminals would satisfy the empire's Christian population and the Allies, which were implementing their own investigations and war crimes trials in the Istanbul occupation authority. The most notable Ottoman committee of inquiry was the one from the Chamber of Deputies' Fifth Department.

=== Investigation by the Parliament ===
The Chamber established a committee of inquiry to investigate the cause of Turkey's entry into the Great War. The Chamber would also accept Fuat Bey of Divaniye's proposal to establish a High Court of Justice to try former members of the Said Halim and Talât Pasha cabinets involved in prosecuting a war of aggression and killing of Armenian non-combatants.

Inquiry by the Parliament's Fifth Department to gather evidence lasted about a month. It became clear that the decision to enter World War I was taken without the knowledge of most of the cabinet. According to testimony the government was unaware and uninvolved in policies to murder non-combatants, meaning the genocide was accomplished extra-legally. Likewise, the government was unaware of the Special Organization's existence. The Interior Ministry, responsible for the deportations, thwarted existing commissions of inquiry that were investigating irregularities in the deportations. Many deportees were deported from places far from theaters of war and subsequently executed outside of military sectors.

However there were issues with the committee of inquiry, there were key witnesses that were not available to testify, the CUP leaders that escaped the capital on November 5th: Talât, Enver, Cemal, Doctor Nazım, Doctor Şakir, and Cemal Azmi. The committee was derived from the parliament, which was elected in 1914 before the war and included CUP members, leading to calls for new elections to promulgate a more powerful committee of inquiry.

Once the parliament was dissolved the minutes and work was transferred to the extraordinary court martial.

==== Said Halim Pasha's testimony ====
Said Halim Pasha revealed the lack of control and knowledge the government had over the CUP. Questioned of his government's secret alliance with Germany, Said Halim Pasha lied to say he was unaware of his ministers' dealings with German diplomats, even though German diplomatic communications confirmed his involvement. He asserted the treatment of Armenian deportees was normal and necessary due to Armenian nationalist rearguard actions, but believed the implementation of the deportation a "disaster" and something he wasn't responsible for. Said Halim claimed he only learned of atrocities committed after they happened, and directed the chairman of the commission to investigate the War and Interior Ministry.

== Collective responsibility vis a vis partition ==
Beginning under the Tevfik Pasha government, many CUP leaders were arrested and sent in front of the special martial law court. These trials were at first supported by both anti-Unionists in Istanbul and the Turkish Nationalist Movement, which wished to bear less harsh peace terms from the allied powers. Ottoman lawmakers, including Armenians like Boshgezenian, advocated for war crimes trials to avoid collective responsibility. The Allies insisting war crimes and partition of the empire being unified points quickly evaporated good will among the nationalists, which accused Paris of conflating two separate questions. Among the effort's most ardent supporter: Damat Ferid Pasha, rejected calls for collective responsibility, saying that "the innocent Turkish nation [was] free of the stain of injustice." Instead:

The whole blame rested squarely on the few leaders of the CUP, who, through their alliance with Germany and their control of the army, had terrorized the rest of Turkey into submission. Not only had Christians been persecuted, but three million Muslims had felt the terror of the CUP as well.

The principle of individual retribution over collective responsibility was something in common between Istanbul and the nationalists. Ferid advocated for a shallow purge: prosecute Talât, Enver, Cemal, and "a handful of secondary accomplices." Ferid wrote "There are only one or two wretches responsible for the disasters... The degenerates who carried them out are nothing but Bolsheviks, and thus the Turkish nation cannot be held responsible." It was this rejection of collective responsibility for war crimes which was the foundation of Ferid's argument: that the Ottoman Empire didn't deserve to be partitioned. According to Taner Akçam, partition of the Ottoman Empire as a punishment for war crimes was a primary justification among the victorious powers for realizing imperialist ambitions in the Middle East. Ferid Pasha's audacious rebuke of partition, and his insistence the Ottoman Empire's territory must return to status quo antebellum save for plebiscites in the Arab provinces, for this reason amazed the Big Four leaders, whom concluded the Ottoman delegation to the Paris Peace Conference was not to be taken seriously. Wilson later said that he "had never seen anything more stupid", with Lloyd George calling Ferid Pasha's memorandum "good jokes." On 25 June 1919, the Council of Ten stated the Turks as a people could not evade responsibility for "murdering Armenians without any justification", and therefore culpability befell on the whole Turkish people. "A nation must be judged by the Government which rules it."

Ahmed Rıza citing the principle of executive responsibility, called for responsibility to fall upon the government.

== Question of war guilt ==
Also up on trial were the decision makers which dragged the Ottoman Empire into war. Istanbul came to the consensus that CUP leadership were adventurists that treasonously dragged the country into a disastrous war of choice, while nationalists claimed the war was forced on the nation. Upon the signing of the Amasya Protocol, a brief rapprochement opened between Istanbul and the nationalists. The Committee of Representation (then in Sivas, soon in Ankara) declared that it had no connection with the CUP and endorsed legal proceedings against those which committed crimes of aggression and war crimes. However the agreement between the two parties restricted the scope of punishment to only cabinet members.

== Findings of the Commission of 15 ==
In January 1919, delegates of the big five (United States, Britain, France, Italy, Japan) recommended establishing the Commission on the Responsibility of the Authors of the War and Enforcement of Penalties, also known as the commission of 15, to set up a frame work to allow for the prosecution of war crimes. This commission soon concluded that World War I was started by Germany in a premeditated fashion, and that the Ottoman Empire and Bulgaria were responsible for assisting in Germany's quest to wage a war. The report published accused the Central Powers of conducting the war in a "barbaric or illegitimate manner that violates established laws, the traditions of war and the principles of humanity." Highlighted was the treatment of Armenians and Greeks by the Ottoman government, of which it was accused in multiple and repeated instances of two types of crimes: those committed by one state against the armed forces of another state or its subjects while under occupation (war crime) and crimes against its own citizens on their own sovereign territory (crime against humanity). This was the first time a distinction was made between these two concepts.

After a debate over what framework of international law to try CUP leaders, it was decided to try them on the basis of the humanitarian principles of the Hague Conventions: "Any person within enemy countries accused of crimes against humanity or against the laws and customs of war shall be criminally prosecuted, regardless of [their] position or rank, including heads of state." Less unanimous among the commission was where and what type of tribunal would be established. The commission of 15 presented their findings to the Council of 10 on 29 March, the powerful decision-making body of the Paris Peace Conference, in a tense atmosphere due to increasing tensions between the victors. On 9 April, Woodrow Wilson dropped previous objections to what those in his government derided as a "Law of Humanity", and it was decided to try war criminals in military tribunals (instead of an international court) for "crimes against the law of war." Wilson acknowledged the application of this charge was nearly impossible to deliver justice.

== Prelude ==
On 12 November 1918, Allied forces disembarked in Istanbul to establish a military presence in the city, beginning a period of de facto occupation (to be a full occupation in March 1920), as other allied forces established military presences or full occupations in the rest of the empire. Over the course of the Armistice Era British garrisons set out to arrest known war criminals that the Ottoman government did not cashier, and try them in ad hoc military courts. This state of affairs was scandalous to the Ottoman officer corps, which talked of a mutiny, as the idea of them being tried in front of a foreign military court was quite dishonorable. Though Sultan Mehmed VI was largely supportive of the effort, he expressed his fear to his foreign minister of a reaction which could see him deposed or killed, hoping on Allied protection of his person. The French, concerned of an Ottoman reaction against British vigilantism, called for proceedings to be carried out by the Ottoman government. Both states presented to the Ottoman government lists of war criminal suspects, most of which the government denied arrest for being "direct contravention[s] of the rights of sovereignty." After a reaction from the Ottoman government protesting against trying officers in foreign military courts for being contrary to previously established international law, Britain and France suspended arrest campaigns, resorting to presenting lists of suspects to the Sublime Porte.

Beyond the desire to punish war criminals being solely an Allied concern, it also had organic support in the Empire. The CUP's liberal opposition, most principally the reconstructed Freedom and Accord Party, included the punishment of those guilty of massacres in their program, and asked the Sultan and public to support this effort.

Those already in British custody had not yet had their legal regimes decided. In early February 1919, Britain vetoed an attempt by Tevfik Pasha to form an impartial tribunal of Danish, Swiss, Swedish, Dutch, and Spanish justices, and an attempt by Damat Ferid Pasha to form a mixed Ottoman–British tribunal in Istanbul. On 17 December 1919, the British War Ministry authorized the establishment of military tribunals in occupation zones to have the authority to try current crimes within their zones. Those involved in massacring Christians were to be sent to Malta, where the question of legal regime would continue to pend.

On March 5, Damat Ferid Pasha formed a government, and when presented with a list of alleged war criminals, had them arrested and detained in Ottoman prisons, and refused to hand them over to the British. Under international pressure, the Ottoman government took the initiative to open an extensive prosecution against its war criminals.

== Turkish courts martial, 1919–1920 ==
Just as de-Nazification became a guiding principle of Allied policy in Germany after the Second World War, cleansing Turkey of the CUP and punishment for the Unionist crimes weighed heavily on British – and Allied – thinking after the conclusion of the armistice at Mudros.

— Andrew Mango, Atatürk

The initial prosecution of war criminals was established between 1919 and 1920, which charged Committee of Union and Progress leaders for subversion of the Constitution, war profiteering, and with what is now called genocide against both Greeks and Armenians. At the same time the British Foreign Office conducted its own investigation into alleged war crimes, debating whether the process was adequately dealt with by Turkish courts martial.

The court sat for nearly a year, from April 1919 through March 1920, although it became clear after just a few months that the tribunal was simply going through the motions. The judges had conveniently condemned the first set of defendants (Enver, et al.) when they were safely out of the country, but now, with Turkish lives genuinely on the line, the Tribunal, despite making a great show of its efforts, had no intention of returning convictions. Admiral Sir Somerset Gough-Calthorpe protested to the Sublime Porte, took the trials out of Turkish hands, and removed the proceedings to Malta. There an attempt was made to seat an international tribunal, but the Turks bungled the investigations and mishandled the documentary evidence so that nothing of their work could be used by the international court.

Admiral John de Robeck replaced Admiral Gough-Calthorpe on August 5, 1919, as "Commander in Chief, Mediterranean, and High Commissioner, at Constantinople". In August 1920, the proceedings were halted, and Admiral John de Robeck informed London of the futility of continuing the tribunal with the remark: "Its findings cannot be held of any account at all." According to European Court of Human Rights judge Giovanni Bonello, "quite likely the British found the continental inquisitorial system of penal procedure used in Turkey repugnant to its own paths to criminal justice and doubted the propriety of relying on it". Or, possibly, the Turkish government never came round to hand over the incriminating documents used by the military courts. Whatever the reason, with the advent of power of Atatürk, all the documents on which the Turkish military courts had based their trials and convictions were "lost".

== Prosecution in Malta ==
=== Malta exiles ===
Malta exiles (Turkish: Malta sürgünleri) (between March 1919 – October 1920) is the term used by Turkey for war criminals (including high-ranking soldiers, political figures and administrators) of the Ottoman Empire who were selected from Constantinople prisons and sent into exile to the Crown Colony of Malta after the armistice of Mudros, in a failed attempt of prosecution that occurred during the Occupation of Constantinople by the Allied forces. Following the occupation of Smyrna by the Greek forces in May 1919, large manifestations in protest occurred on the Anatolian mainland raising pressure upon the courts martial. The judges then ordered the release of 41 suspects in order to calm down the situation. The release was not what the allied forces had in mind, and caused them to consider a better detention facility than the Bekirağa military prison, well aware that the prison might be captured by the protestors and its prisoners released.

The Allied Government sent sixty seven war criminals to Malta in a prosecution attempt coordinated by the British forces. Ottoman war criminals were named and relocated from Constantinople's jails to the British colony of Malta on board of SS Princess Ena Malta and HMS Benbow starting in 1919, where they were believed to be held for some three years while searches were made in the archives of Constantinople, London, Paris and Washington to find a way to prosecute them. The prisoners were secluded in three different groups.

- A: for people suspected of having taken part in massacres
- B: for people suspected of having tolerated massacres
- C: for people who were not suspected of having taken direct action in massacres

The competing Ankara government was strictly opposed to trials against war criminals. Mustafa Kemal Atatürk reasoned about the detainees in Malta on the occasion of the congress in Sivas 4 September 1919: "...should any of the detainees either already brought or yet to be brought to Constantinople be executed, even at the order of the vile Constantinople government, we would seriously consider executing all British prisoners in our custody." From February 1921 the military court in Constantinople begun releasing prisoners without trials.

The release of the Turkish detainees in Malta was accomplished in exchange for 22 British prisoners held by Mustafa Kemal Atatürk. As a result of this, the British authorities did not use any of the – mostly documentary – evidence on Armenian atrocities of which Turkish prisoners had been accused and convicted by Turkish military courts shortly after the armistice. Ottoman military members and high-ranking politicians convicted by the Turkish courts-martial were transferred from Constantinople prisons to the Crown Colony of Malta on board Princess Ena and HMS Benbow by the British forces, starting in 1919. Admiral Sir Somerset Gough-Calthorpe was in charge of the operation, together with Lord Curzon; they did so owing to the lack of transparency of the Turkish courts-martial. They were held there for three years, while searches were made of archives in Constantinople, London, Paris and Washington to find a way to put them on trial. However, the war criminals were eventually released without trial and returned to Constantinople in 1921, in exchange for 22 British prisoners of war held by the government in Ankara, including a relative of Lord Curzon. The government in Ankara was opposed to political power of the government in Constantinople. They are often mentioned as the Malta exiles in some sources.

=== Legal foundation ===
In 1918 an American list of 11 "outlaws of civilization" was drawn up to be targeted for "condign punishment":

The list included the three leading Young Turk leaders, comprising the Ittihad triumvirate. A similar, but larger list, was prepared in 1917 in France by Tancrede Martel, an international law expert, who argued that the men he indicated deserved to be tried as common criminals by ordinary civil and criminal courts of the Allied countries because of the type and scope of the atrocities they were accused of having perpetrated. In its final report, completed on March 29, 1919, the commission on Responsibilities through Annex 1, table 2, identified thirteen Turkish categories of outrages liable to criminal prosecution.

The British Foreign Office demanded 141 Turks be tried for crimes against British soldiers, and 17 for the crimes against Armenians during World War I.

The Allied authority to proceed with any prosecutions was created as part of the Paris Peace Conference, 1919, with the establishment of "The Commission on Responsibilities and Sanctions", which was chaired by U.S Secretary of State Robert Lansing. The commission's work saw several articles added to the Treaty of Sèvres to effect indictments against the acting heads of government of the Ottoman Empire, Sultan Mehmed VI and Damat Ferid Pasha. The Treaty of Sèvres gave recognition of the Democratic Republic of Armenia and developed a mechanism to bring to trial those accused of "barbarous and illegitimate methods of warfare... [including] offenses against the laws and customs of war and the principles of humanity".

Article 230 of the Treaty of Sèvres required the Ottoman Empire:

... to hand over to the Allied Powers the persons whose surrender may be required by the latter as being responsible for the massacres committed during the continuance of the state of war on territory which formed part of the Ottoman Empire on August 1, 1914.

As a signatory to the treaty, the Ottoman Empire specifically recognized the right of the Allies to convene international tribunals to conduct war crimes trials.

By 1921 the British High Commission had gathered a body of information from its Greek and Armenian sources about the Turkish prisoners held at Malta, and about 1000 others, all alleged to have been directly or indirectly guilty of participation in massacres. The Allies had "a mountain of documents" related to the Armenian genocide, but these were mostly general and did not clearly implicate specific individuals.

=== Suspension of prosecution ===
According to the former judge at the European Court of Human Rights Giovanni Bonello the suspension of prosecutions, the repatriation and release of Turkish detainees was amongst others a result of the lack of an appropriate legal framework with supranational jurisdiction, because following World War I no international norms for regulating war crimes existed, due to a legal vacuum in international law; therefore contrary to Turkish sources, no trials were ever held in Malta.

On March 16, 1921, the Turkish Foreign Minister and the British Foreign Office signed an agreement in London. In exchange for the 22 British prisoners in Turkey, among them a relative of Lord Curzon and brother of Lord Rawlinson, Britain would set free 64 Turkish prisoners from Malta. These excluded those it was intended to prosecute for alleged offences in violation of the laws and customs of war or for massacres committed in any part of the Turkish Empire after war had broken out. British Admiral Sir John Michael de Robeck, who had been second-in-command of Allied naval forces at the Dardanelles, commented: "It would be hard under these conditions to convict most of the exiles before an Allied court."

In relation to prisoner exchange Article 2 under the Agreement For the Immediate Release of Prisoners reads:

The repatriation of Turkish prisoners of war and interned civilians now in the hands of the British authorities shall commence at once, and shall continue as quickly as possible. This will not apply, however, to persons whom it is intended to try for alleged offences in violation of the laws and customs of war, or for massacres committed during the continuance of the state of war in territory which formed part of the Turkish Empire on 1st August, 1914 ...

British Foreign Secretary Lord Curzon said the subsequent release of many of the Turkish prisoners was "a great mistake", and wrote:

The less we say about these people [the Turks detained at Malta] the better ... I had to explain why we released the Turkish deportees from Malta skating over thin ice as quickly as I could. There would have been a row I think ... The staunch belief among members [of Parliament is] that one British prisoner is worth a shipload of Turks, and so the exchange was excused ...

== Aftermath ==
Separate Turkish domestic prosecutions resulted in the convictions and sentencing to death of many of the masterminds of the Armenian genocide. As many of the principal architects of the genocide had managed to escape prior to sentencing, the Armenian Revolutionary Federation decided at its 9th General Congress, which convened in Yerevan from September 27 to the end of October 1919, to pursue an assassination campaign against those it perceived to be responsible. A task force, led by Shahan Natalie, working with Grigor Merjanov, was established to assassinate Talaat Pasha, Javanshir Khan, Said Halim Pasha, Behaeddin Shakir Bey, Jemal Azmi, Jemal Pasha, Enver Pasha, and others, including several Armenians.

Some of those accused as war criminals led politically influential lives in the nascent Turkish state. Mustafa Abdülhalik Renda, for instance, who had "work[ed] with great energy for the destruction of the Armenians", later became the Turkish Minister of Finance and Speaker of the Assembly and, for one day, following the death of Kemal Atatürk, President. General Vehip Pasa, and various German sources, also implicated Abdülhalik in the burning to death of thousands of people in Mus Province.

Armenian historian Vahakn N. Dadrian commented that the Allied efforts at prosecution were an example of "a retributive justice [that] gave way to expedience of political accommodation".

Peter Balakian—referring to the post-war Ottoman military tribunals, none of which was held in Malta—commented that "The trials represent a milestone in the history of war-crimes tribunals." Although they were truncated in the end by political pressures, and directed by Turkey's domestic laws rather than an international tribunal, the Constantinople trials (Turkish Courts-Martial of 1919–20) were an antecedent to the Nuremberg Trials following World War II.

In 1926, Kemal had six genocide perpetrators, including Nazım Bey and Yenibahçeli Nail Bey, hanged for allegedly plotting to assassinate him. The trials and hangings were unrelated to the genocide.

== Purging of evidence ==
A leaked cable signed by David Arnett on July 4, 2004, at the Consulate General of the US in Istanbul states that Turkish Ambassador Nuri Birgi was effectively in charge of destroying evidence during the 1980s. During the process of eliminating the evidence, ambassador Birgi stated in reference to the Armenians: "We really slaughtered them."

== See also ==
- Outline and timeline of the Greek genocide
- Turkish war crimes
- Leipzig war crimes trials
- War crimes in World War I
