= Selma Rıza =

Turkish novelist (1872-1931)

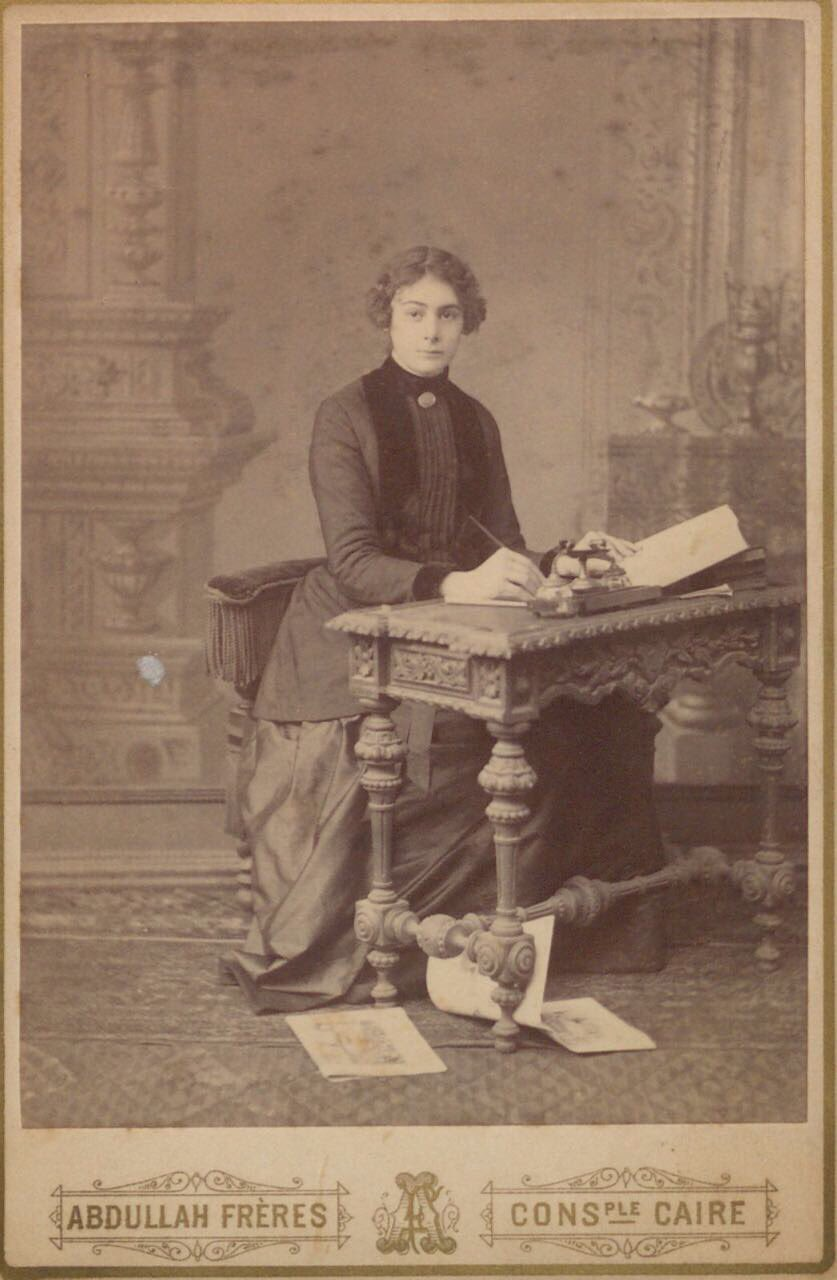
- Born: 5 February 1872; Constantinople, Ottoman Empire
- Died: 5 October 1931 (aged 59); Istanbul, Turkey
- Education: University of Sorbonne
- Occupations: Journalist, novelist
- Organization(s): Committee of Union and Progress; Turkish Red Crescent
- Known for: First Turkish female journalist
- Relatives: Ahmet Rıza (brother)

Selma Rıza (5 February 1872 – 5 October 1931) was a Turkish novelist, humanitarian, and the first female Turkish journalist. She was general secretary of the Ottoman Red Crescent Society from 1908–1913. Her brother was Ahmet Rıza, leader of the Parisian Young Turks, and later President of the Chamber of Deputies.

== Biography ==
Selma Rıza was born on 5 February 1872 in Istanbul. Her father was Ali Rıza, an Ottoman diplomat and statesman, and her mother Naile who was an Austrian convert. She was raised with private lessons at home, where she learned French well. Her older brother Ahmed Rıza had a greatly influenced her education.

In 1892, when she was only twenty, she wrote an unpublished novel titled Uhuvvet ("Friendship").

Rıza secretly escaped from her family and Istanbul to Paris, France, in 1898 to meet her elder brother Ahmet Rıza, who was a member of the Young Turks movement. She continued her education in Sorbonne University, and lived in Paris for ten years. She affiliated herself with the Committee of Union and Progress (CUP). She was the only female member of the society. There, Rıza wrote in two newspapers published by CUP in Paris namely Mechveret Supplément Français in French and Şûrây-i Ummet in Turkish. From 1899 onwards, she was writing about women's place in society.

After the Young Turk Revolution of 1908, Rıza returned to İstanbul. While she gave largely up journalism, she became the secretary general of Turkish Red Crescent between 1908 and 1913, but left the institution after disagreeing with its management. She wrote two more novels between 1910 and 1912, but did not publish them. Rıza wrote articles for Hanımlara Mahsus Gazete ("Newspaper for Women") and Kadınlar Dünyası ("Women's World").

She fought for schools to be opened for Muslim women in Istanbul. Rıza worked hard to transform the Adile Sultan Palace, a royal palace in İstanbul, to a girls' school. With the help of her brother Ahmet, she succeeded and the palace was used as Kandilli High School for Girls up to 1986, when it was partially burned down.

During the Turkish War of Independence she supported Mustafa Kemal Pasha. After her death, her relatives assumed the surname Feraceli; so sometimes she is also known as Selma Rıza Feraceli.

She died on 5 October 1931.

Rıza's unpublished novel Uhuvvet ("Friendship") was eventually published in 1999, long after her death, by the Ministry of Culture.
