= Ahmet Rıza =

Ottoman politician, Young Turk (1858–1930)

Ahmed Rıza Bey
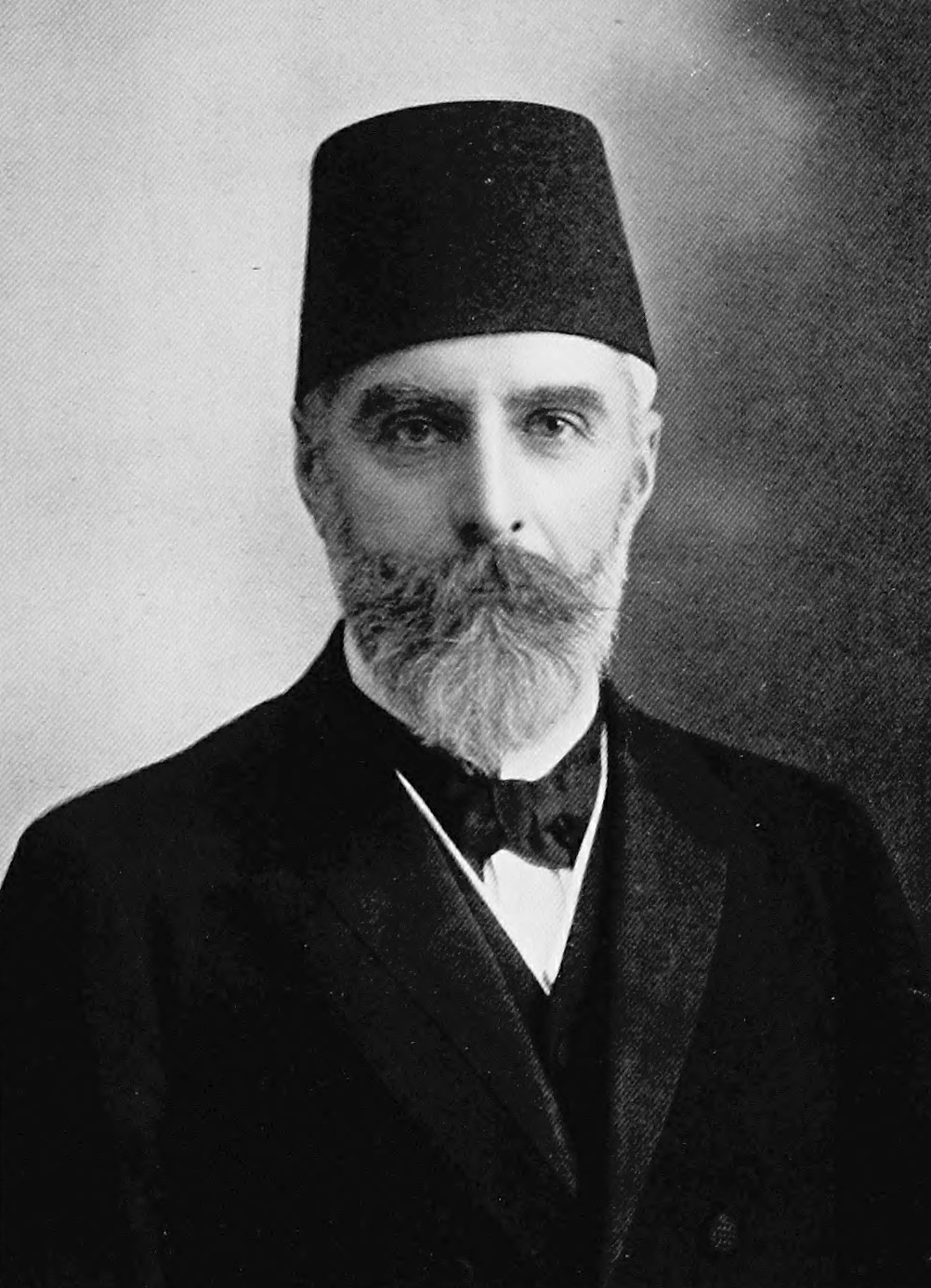
- Rıza in 1909

President of the Senate
- In office 9 October 1918 – 2 April 1919

Senator
- In office 18 April 1912 – 2 April 1919

President of the Chamber of Deputies
- In office 17 December 1908 – 1911
- Monarchs: Abdul Hamid II; Mehmed V
- Deputy: Mehmed Talaat, Ruhi al-Khalidi
- Preceded by: Hasan Fehmi Pasha (1878)
- Succeeded by: Halil Menteşe

Member of the Chamber of Deputies
- In office 17 December 1908 – 18 January 1912
- Constituency: Istanbul (1908)

Personal details
- Born: 1858 Constantinople, Ottoman Empire (modern Istanbul, Turkey)
- Died: 26 February 1930 (aged 71–72) Istanbul, Turkey
- Party: Committee of Union and Progress (1894–1910)
- Other political affiliations: Vahdet-i Milliye Cemiyeti (1918)
- Relations: Selma Rıza (sister)
- Parent(s): Ali Rıza; Naile Sabıka
- Education: École nationale supérieure d'Agronomie de Grignon; University of Sorbonne
- Profession: Sociologist, politician

Ahmed Rıza Bey (1858 – 26 February 1930) was a Turkish activist, intellectual, politician, author, educator, polymath, and a prominent Young Turk. He was an early leader of the Committee of Union and Progress.

During the nearly twenty years that he lived in Paris, he led the Paris branch of the Committee of Ottoman Union, which would later be named the Committee of Union and Progress, and together with Doctor Nâzım Bey he founded Meşveret, the first official publication of the society, where he was exiled. In addition to his work as an opposition leader, Rıza doubled as a positivist ideologue.

Following the 1908 revolution, he was proclaimed as the "Father of Liberty" and became the first President of the revived Chamber of Deputies, the lower house of the Ottoman Parliament. By 1910 he distanced himself from the CUP as it turned more radical and authoritarian. In 1912, he was appointed as a Senator. He was the leading negotiator during the failed talks for a military alliance between the Ottoman Empire, France, and Britain for World War I. During the war, he was among the few politicians who opposed and condemned the Armenian genocide while it was ongoing. In the Armistice Era he was appointed as president of the Senate and prosecuted his former Unionist comrades. After a falling out with Damat Ferid Pasha he once again went to France, where he supported Mustafa Kemal Pasha (Atatürk)'s Nationalists, returning to Turkey after the signing of the Treaty of Lausanne.

== Early life ==
Ahmed Rıza was born in Istanbul in 1858 to a family that was in public service for generations, the eldest of seven children. He was the son of Ali Rıza Bey a statesman and Senator. Ahmed's grandfather was the Minister of Agriculture and Mint, also named Ali Rıza. Ahmed's great-grandfather was Kemankeş Efendi, Sultan Selim III's Sır Kâtibi (Secret Secretary); His father was a Turkish kadı that served in Egypt. Ali Rıza was nicknamed İngiliz ("Englishman") because of his command of the English language and admiration of Britain. His wife, Fräulein Turban, was born in Munich but of Hungarian origin. She moved to Vienna, where she met İngiliz while he was on a diplomatic mission, and converted to Islam to marry him, taking the name Naile Sabıka Hanım. Among Ahmed's siblings, his youngest sister was Selma Rıza, who became the first female Turkish journalist.

Ahmed's childhood was spent in the family farm in Vaniköy. In addition to more bookish interests like poetry, he enjoyed hunting and gardening, and likely wrote the first book on hunting in Turkey. Under his mother's influence he was raised with a Western education, and attended the Mekteb-i Sultânî (modern Galatasaray High School). He began a career in civil service working at the Sublime Porte's Translation Office.

With the dissolution of the Ottoman Parliament, Ahmet accompanied his father to his exile to Ilgın, Konya. Along the way he noticed the poor conditions of the peasants. The journey made Rıza concerned of their well-being, and he wished to introduce them to modern cultivation methods, which led him to study agriculture in France. In 1884 he graduated from Grignon University with a degree in agricultural engineering. While in Paris he discovered the positivist ideas of Auguste Comte and Jean-François Robinet.

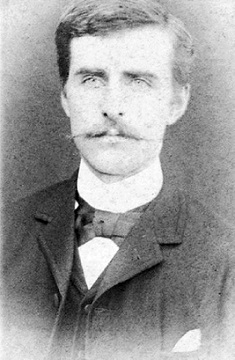
Ahmet Rıza in his early years

He tried to use his education to establish an enterprise using the latest agricultural techniques, but wasn't successful, following which he failed to acquire a civil service position at the Ministry of Agriculture. Rıza was appointed as a principal and chemistry teacher at a school in Bursa, and soon became director of education of the city. But being pessimistic about significant reform he decided to go back to France to begin an opposition movement.

== In Paris ==
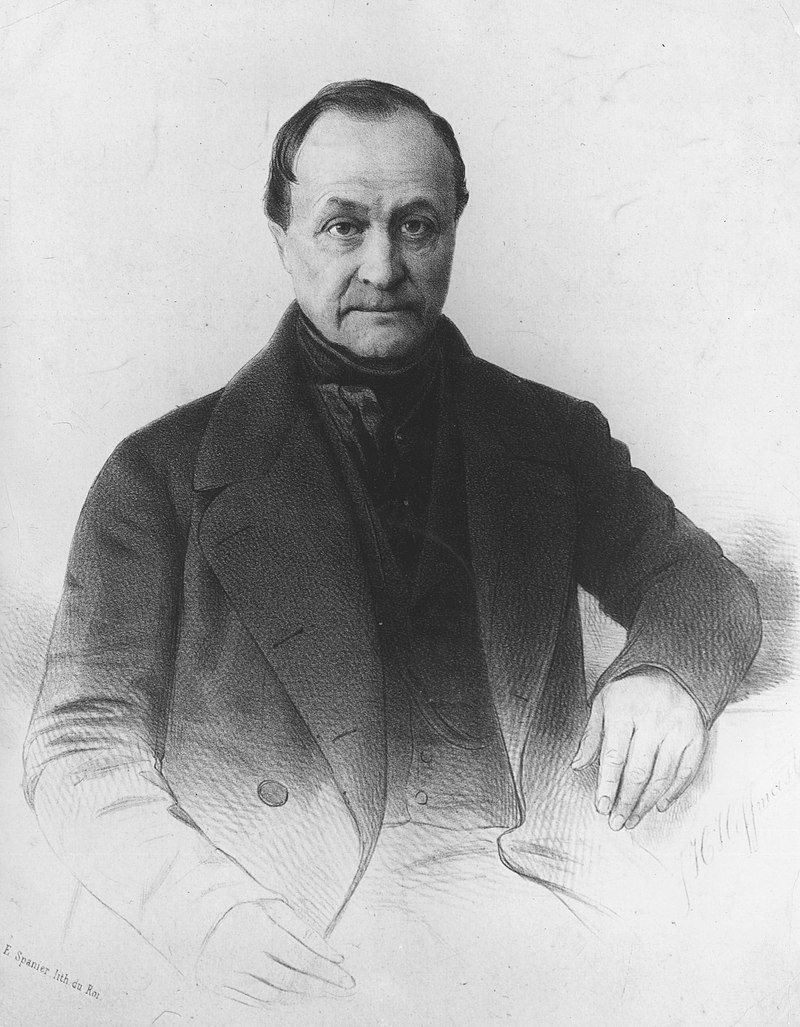
Rıza was highly influenced by Auguste Comte's and his works

In 1889 Rıza moved to Paris where he found an apartment on Rue Monge in the 5th arrondissement, arriving to participate in the exhibition organized for the centenary of the French Revolution. Rıza initially maintained a quiet life making a living as a translator in the French judicial system. At Sorbonne University, he attended Pierre Laffitte's lectures on positivism and natural history. This wasn't the first time he encountered positivism, he had earlier read Jean-François Eugène Robinet’s biography of Auguste Comte. He was influenced by Laffitte's thoughts about Islam and Eastern civilization in particular. Laffitte believed that Islam was the most advanced religion, so it was easy for Muslims to embrace positivism. Rıza became an active member of the Société Positiviste, and served as a Muslim or Ottoman representative in conferences meant to spread positivism internationally, or to create a "United States of Europe".

In his first years in Paris, he defended the actions of the Ottoman government which were criticized in the press. In 1891, Constantinople ordered Rıza to return to the empire due to the "libertine" language he used in a conference about Ottoman women, but he did not comply.

Though patriotic of his country, Rıza determined a lack of education and positive sciences was the reason for the Ottoman Empire's backwardness compared to the rest of Europe. In 1893, Ahmed Rıza sent multiple petitions to Sultan Abdul Hamid II where he outlined the benefits of a constitutional regime and its adherence to the Islamic principle of consultation. This being part of a larger suggested reform package, he initially received interest from the Sultan. But discouraged after no response to his sixth petition, he began publishing his reform proposals in the French newsletter La Jeune Turquie, edited by his friend Khalil Ghanim (Halil Ganim), in the form of a pamphlet called Lâyiha ve Mektub (Petition and Letter) in London. The Hamidian regime attempted to intimidate Rıza with censorship, bribes, offers of amnesty, and threats to friends and family, but he stubbornly refused to fold until the regime's collapse in 1908.

== Leading the Committee of Union and Progress ==
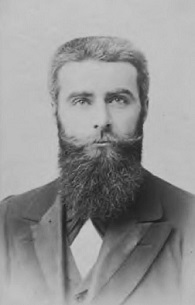
In his middle ages

Rıza started corresponding with the members of the Committee of Ottoman Union in 1892. It is thought that he made suggestions to the first draft program of the society. When the leading members of Ottoman Union were arrested and released a short time later that year, many of them fled to Paris. In 1894, these émigrés, especially Doctor Mehmet Nazım, suggested that he join the society, Rıza accepted but requested that the name of the society be changed. His suggestion was that the society should be called Order and Progress (Nizam ve Terakki), Comte's positivist motto. The society compromised by adopting the name "Union and Progress" instead.

This made him leader of the Paris branch of the Committee of Union and Progress, a group that was centered around the newspaper Meşveret, a journal that he published with Ghanim. There he attempted to synthesize positivism within the Ottoman-Islamic philosophic tradition. Rıza also published a series of articles advocating for constitutionalism for the Ottoman Empire, which he justified through its adherence with the Islamic principle of consultation. Ahmed Rıza, his Parisian circle, and Meşveret became synonymous with the CUP and the Young Turks movement. He also contributed for Ali Şefkati's İstikbal during this time.

Rıza was horrified by the Hamidian massacres, which he blamed on the sultan and condemned as contrary to "the traditions of Islam and the precepts of the Quran". During the Greco-Turkish War, Ahmed Rıza was expelled from the CUP after he refused to pull an article he published in Meşveret in support of the Cretan Rebellion.

Throughout his exile he was constantly approached by Ottoman agents with generous offers of amnesty for his defection, which he always refused. However, Ahmed Rıza's stubborn secularism and internationalist positivism caused a rift with conservative Young Turks which united around Mizancı Murad. The basis for this conflict may have been Rıza's attempt to merge the CUP with the Positivist Committee of Paris. Most frustrating of all for the Unionists was Rıza staunch opposition to revolution, instead believing in progress through political evolution. In a congress held in December 1896, Murad Bey was elected as president of the CUP, replacing Ahmed Rıza. As a result of pressure from Yıldız Palace, the French government banned the Meşveret on 11 April 1896. Rıza took his newspaper to Switzerland in May, before settling in Belgium in September 1897. Rıza had to relocate again when the Belgian government banned Meşveret and deported him in 1898, an action condemned by the Belgian Parliament. Ahmed Rıza gave up publishing the paper in Turkish, instead continuing its existence in French. He was accused of atheism by conservative Young Turks and supporters of Abdul Hamid II. By 1899, the Ottoman government clamped opposition even tighter. More Unionists were arrested in Istanbul and Mizancı Murad and his friends returned to Istanbul for amnesty and dissolved the CUP. What consoled Rıza during this time was that the Young Turks that remained in Europe began to gather around him again and he reconciled with the Geneva Young Turks. His sister Selma also joined him in Paris, making her the first female member of the society.

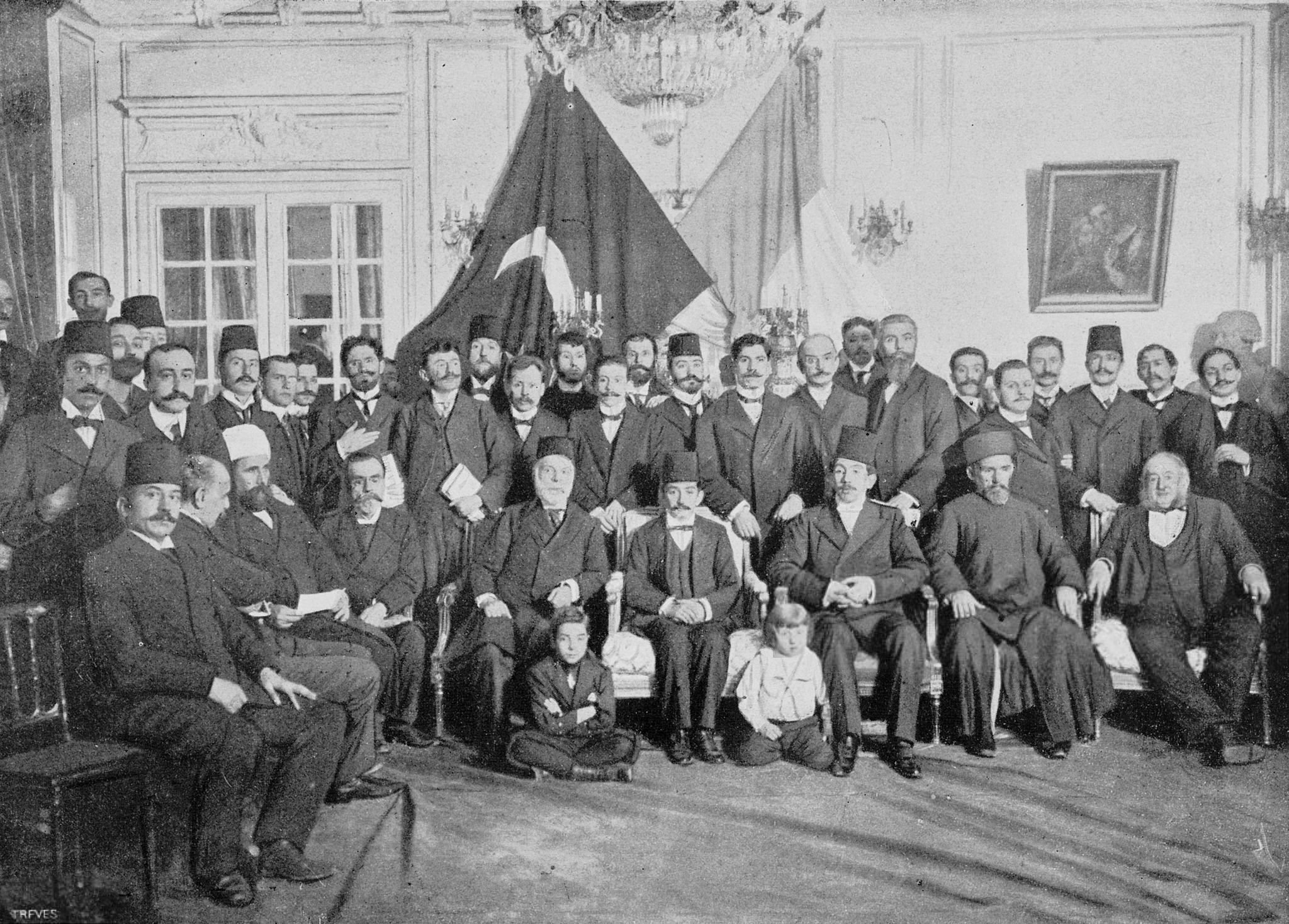
The First Young Turk Congress

At the end of 1899, the Young Turk movement was revived with the defections of Ismail Qemali, and the Sultan's brother in law and nephews: Damat Mahmut Pasha, Prince Sabahattin, and Lütfullah. However these new defectors had different ideas for the future of the Ottoman Empire. At the invitation of Prince Sabahattin and his brother, the First Congress of Ottoman Opposition was convened in Paris in February 1902. At the congress, two groups emerged which were divided on the question of inviting foreign intervention to assist in overthrowing the regime: the "interventionists", consisting of Prince Sabahattin and the Armenian delegates, and the "non-interventionists", who were supporters of Ahmed Rıza, who remained in the minority. Rıza was also opposed to any autonomous status for the Armenian-populated eastern provinces. After the congress, Rıza and his supporters founded the Committee of Progress and Union, while Prince Sabahattin founded the Ottoman Freedom-Lover's Committee. The CPU soon established the magazine Şûrâ-yı Ümmet, essentially a continuation of Meşveret, based in Cairo, which Rıza contributed to.

In 1905 Şehzade Yusuf İzzeddin's private physician Doctor Bahaeddin Şakir defected to the Young Turks and reorganized the CPU to be a more revolutionary organization. Rıza's role was diminished. The CPU was strengthened with a new circle of sympathizers inside the Ottoman Empire which organized around the Ottoman Freedom Society. Founded by a group of officers and civil servants from Salonica in 1906, the group included men like Mehmed Talât, İsmâil Enver, Mehmed Cavid, Ahmed Cemâl and others, and the group merged with the CPU in 1907. That year, a Second Congress of Ottoman Opposition was held on 29 December, where Prince Sabahattin's supporters and the Armenian Dashnaks participated. At the congress, supporters of revolution managed to sway Rıza, and the delegates pledged to insight a revolution by all means necessary. However Rıza ruled out the use of terrorism, as it could invite foreign intervention, and the participation of Armenians in a revolution against Abdul Hamid II. In Paris, he played no significant role in the events of the Young Turk Revolution.

== Second Constitutional Era ==
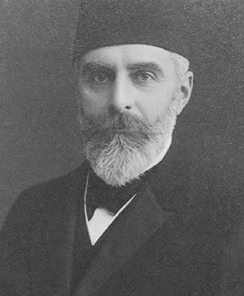
In his later years

After the declaration of the Constitution, Rıza returned to Istanbul on September 25, 1908, where he was welcomed with the "Father of Liberty" (ebü-l ahrar or hürriyetçilerin babası). He held an audience with the sultan on 16 October 1908, and traveled to Europe to meet with liberal pressure groups to support Turkey in the Bosnian crisis. Having nominally lead the CUP for so long, the organization as it now existed in the Ottoman Empire was very different. This created tension between the Old Unionists and those now running the party: Talât, Enver, Şakir, and Cavid.

Ahmed Rıza was inducted into the CUP's Central Committee and after being elected to the Chamber of Deputies as an MP from Istanbul and he was unanimously elected as the President of the Chamber. He was criticized by conservatives for his values. Due to his alleged atheism he was top of the hit list of Islamist rioters during the 31 March Incident. On the first day of the events, Minister of Justice Mustafa Nazım Pasha was mistaken for Rıza and lynched. Rıza resigned upon the request of the Grand Vizier in the atmosphere of rebellion and escaped from the parliament as rebels stormed the building while in session. He hid under German protection in a Baghdad Railway Company building in the city. Rıza returned to his job when the Action Army arrived in Ayastefanos to restore order. He was re-elected as the parliament's president in late 1910. That year he nominated the CUP as an organization deserving of the Nobel Peace Prize for its efforts in advocating for peace in the Ottoman Empire.

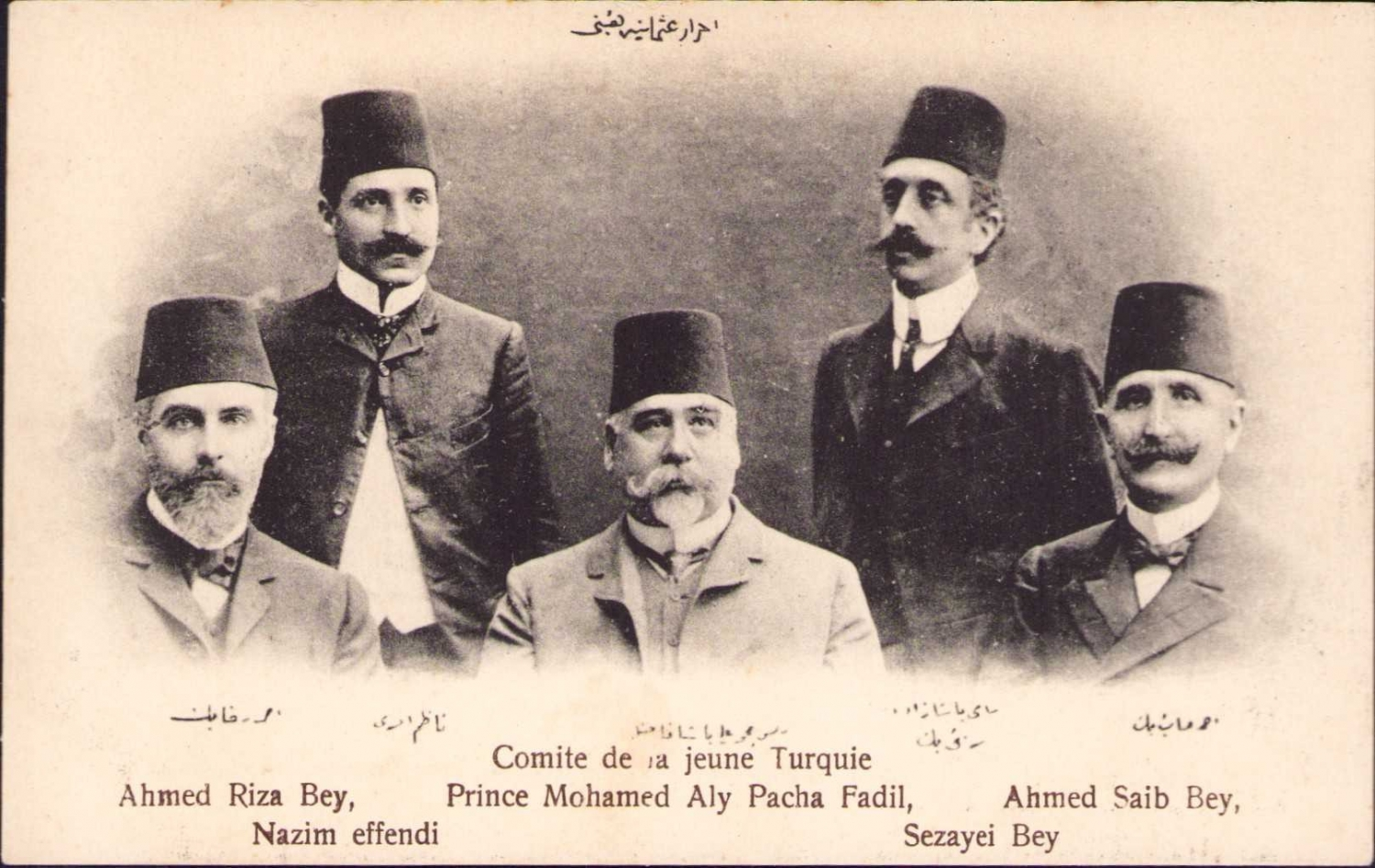
With other members of the Committee of Union and Progress, 1908

However, Rıza became increasingly disillusioned with the CUP for their assassinations of journalists such as Hasan Fehmi and Ahmet Samim and increasing authoritarianism. He resigned from the CUP's Central Committee in 1910, and gave up his parliamentary presidency in 1911. He did not run for reelection with the dissolution of the parliament in January 1912, and was appointed as a Senator by Mehmed V on 18 April 1912. During this period, he harshly criticized the Unionists. After the 1913 coup by the CUP, he completely fell out with the Unionists.

== Years of war ==
During the Balkan Wars he went to Paris to curry diplomatic goodwill for Turkey among the Europeans.

In 1915, Rıza was one of the only Ottoman politicians who condemned the Armenian genocide. About a law to confiscate Armenian property, he stated in parliament: "It is also not legal to classify the goods mentioned by the law as abandoned goods because the Armenian owners of these goods did not abandon them willingly, they were exiled, expelled forcefully." Noting that such confiscation was contrary to the Ottoman Constitution, he added: "Strong-arm me, expel me from my village, then sell my property: this is never lawful. No Ottoman conscience or law can ever accept this." His distaste for the Unionists was such that when offered to join the Supply Commission in 1918, he resigned at its first meeting.

As an educator, he enacted the inauguration of the second high school for girls in Turkey, the Kandilli High School for Girls in 1916 in Istanbul (it was intended to be the first, but the outbreak of World War I delayed the execution of the project).

== Turkish War of Independence ==
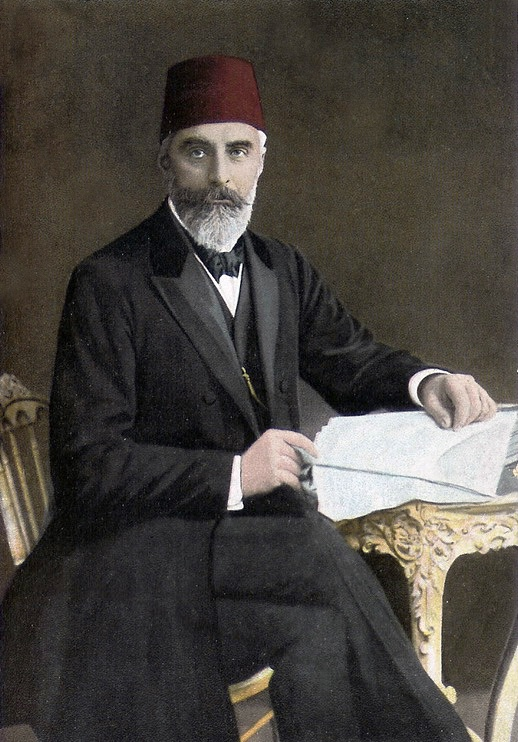
Like many of his other contemporary European progressives, Ahmet Rıza was opposed to colonialism, as well as class privilege.

During the armistice period, Sultan Mehmed VI Vahdettin appointed Ahmed Rıza as president of the Ottoman Senate. He initially threw his hat in with the Sultan. He heavily criticized the Ahmed İzzet Pasha government as a Unionist rearguard. He would assist Mehmed VI in his quest to purge the Unionists by amending the constitution to give his sovereign the power to change and dismiss ministers. However he would eventually disagree with Mehmed VI's decision to dissolve the Chamber of Deputies. Ahmed Rıza was instrumental in establishing war crimes tribunals to try Ottoman war criminals. He noted in his speeches that Armenians had been killed in a premeditated state plan, and that their deaths were those of non-combatants and discriminatory. In his speech to the Chamber:

The Mercy of His Imperial Majesty would not leave the orphans and widows of those Armenians who were brutally killed, of those Arabs who were hanged or deported, to be crushed under the weight of their poverty and despair. There will no longer be any weeping or moaning.

He became a probable candidate for Grand Vizier and it was rumored he could form a government with Mustafa Kemal Pasha, and even met with Fethi Bey to potentially revive the CUP as the government turned dovish to the Allied powers occupying Istanbul. He was outmaneuvered by Damat Ferid Pasha, who was first appointed Grand Vizier on 4 March 1919. During this time he informed the American diplomats of the Ottoman government's opposition to a League of Nation's mandate.

One initiative of Ahmed Rıza to facilitate an agreeable peace treaty was the Vahdet-i Milliye Cemiyeti (National Unity Society), an apolitical association of prominent bureaucrats which corresponded with Allied leaders. The society sent a delegation to Mehmed VI's first Sultanic Council under Rıza's leadership. Eventually, Rıza began to trust Kemal Pasha and the promise of a national resistance movement. After receiving a letter from Kemal, Rıza decided to go to Paris again to lobby for a lighter peace treaty for Turkey. Arriving 19 September 1919, he started a campaign of speeches, interviews, lectures, publishing pamphlets and articles. He corresponded with David Lloyd George, Leon Bourgeois, and Lord Curzon, and personally met with Paul Deschanel, Raymond Poincaré, Clemenceau, and Georges Leygues. He also spoke to the newspapers L'Oeuvre and Temps. He was instrumental in the negotiations between France and the Grand National Assembly government which led to the end of the Franco-Turkish War.

It is not known how well Rıza understood the Turkish Nationalist Movement. Hüseyin Cahid titled one of his letters, "A Unionist who completely failed to understand the National Forces and remained the farthest from it: Ahmed Rıza Bey."

He returned to the Turkish Republic in 1926. Retiring from public life in his Vaniköy farm, Ahmed Rıza wrote his memoirs and a history of the CUP. They were published more than 50 years after his death in 1988 under the title Meclis-i Mebusan ve Ayan Reisi Ahmet Rıza Bey’in Anıları ("The Memoirs of Ahmet Rıza, the President of the Chamber of Deputies and the Senate"). He spent his final years in poverty, selling his library, along with his political documents, to the Turkish Historical Society. He died on 26 February 1930 in Şişli Etfal Hospital in Istanbul, where he was taken after an accidental fall and breaking his hip bone. He is buried in Kandilli Cemetery.

== Honors and decorations ==
He was awarded the Order of Karađorđe's Star.

== Works ==
Ahmed Rıza's memoirs were published in Cumhuriyet by Haluk Y. Şehsuvaroğlu in 1950, and his correspondences in Akşam. He contributed to the following publications: İstikbal, Islâhat, Osmanlı, Meşveret and Mechvéret Supplément Français, Şûrâ-yı Ümmet (1902–1908), La Jeune Turquie, La Revue Occidentale (1896–1908), and Positivist Review (1900–1908).

He published the memorandums he sent to Sultan Abdul Hamid II.

- Vatanın Haline ve Maârif-i Umûmiyyenin Islâhına Dair Sultan Abdülhamid Hân-ı Sânî Hazretleri’ne Takdim Kılınan Altı Lâyihadan Birinci Lâyiha, London A.H. 1312.
  - "First of the Six Memorandums Presented to His Excellency Sultan Abdulhamid Khan on the State of the Homeland and the Reform of Public Education"
- Vatanın Hâline ve Maârif-i Umûmiyyenin Islâhına Dair Sultan Abdülhamid Hân-ı Sâni Hazretleri’ne Takdim Kılınan Lâyihalar Hakkında Makâm-ı Sadârete Gönderilen Mektub, Geneva A.H. 1313, 1314.
  - "Letters Sent to the Grand Viziership Concerning the Memorandums Presented to His Excellency Sultan Abdulhamid Khan on the State of the Homeland and the Reform of Public Education"

=== Books ===
- Rehnüma-yı Sayyad
- Layihalar, 1889
- Tolarance Muslumane, 1897
- Journals of Meşveret, 1903–1908
- La Crise de I’Orient, 1907
- Echos de Turquie, 1920
- La Faillite Morale de la Politique Occidentale en Orient, 1922
- Vazife ve Mesuliyet: Padişah ve Şehzadeler, Egypt, A.H. 1320
- Vazife ve Mesuliyet: Asker, Egypt, A.H. 1320
- Vazife ve Mesuliyet: Kadın

== See also ==
- Witnesses and testimonies of the Armenian genocide
- Sociocultural evolution
- Order and Progress

== Sources ==
- Akçam, Taner (2006). A Shameful Act. Henry Holt and Company. ISBN 978-0-8050-8665-2.
- Kieser, Hans-Lukas (2018). Talaat Pasha: Father of Modern Turkey, Architect of Genocide. Princeton University Press. ISBN 978-1-4008-8963-1.
  - Lay summary in: Kieser, Hans-Lukas. "Pasha, Talat". 1914-1918-online. International Encyclopedia of the First World War.
- Suny, Ronald Grigor (2015). "They Can Live in the Desert but Nowhere Else": A History of the Armenian Genocide. Princeton University Press. ISBN 978-1-4008-6558-1.
  - Lay summary in: Ronald Grigor Suny (26 May 2015). "Armenian Genocide". 1914-1918-online. International Encyclopedia of the First World War.
