= Bahaeddin Şakir =

Turkish nationalist politician (1874–1922)

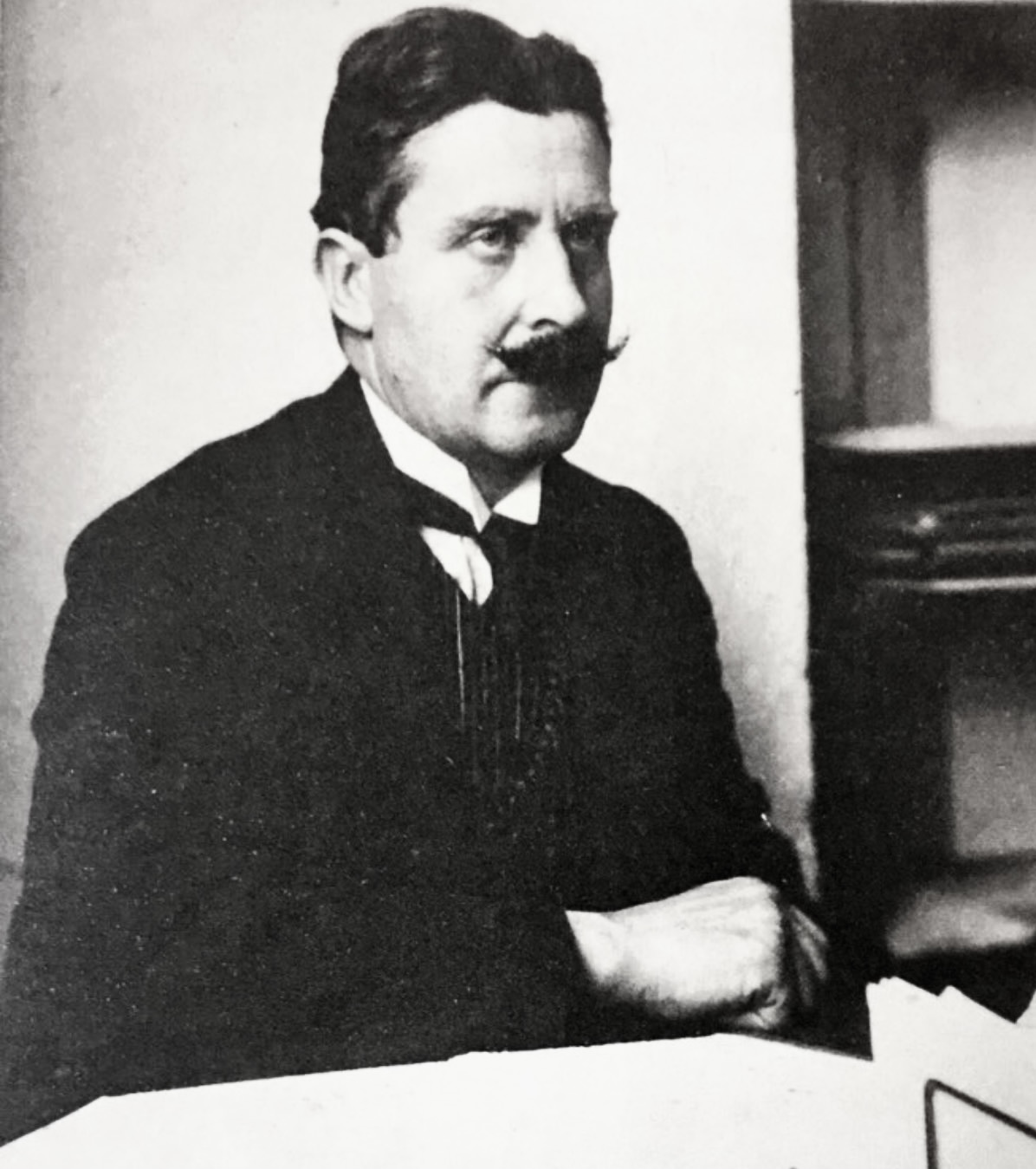
- Born: 1874; Sliven, Ottoman Empire
- Died: 17 April 1922 (aged 47/48); Berlin, Germany
- Cause of death: Assassination by gunshot
- Resting place: Şehitlik Mosque
- Known for: Founding member of the CUP and perpetrator of the Armenian genocide

Bahaeddin Şakir or Bahaddin Şakir (1874 – 17 April 1922) was an Ottoman physician, Turkish nationalist politician, and one of the architects of the Armenian genocide. Though he was not a minister or deputy in the government, he held powerful sway in the Central Committee of the Committee of Union and Progress and was the director of the Şûrâ-yı Ümmet, a magazine that supported the party. He was one of the three important names of the "Doctors Group" in the CUP (the other two being Doctor Nâzım and Doctor Rüsuhi Dikmen); He was a part of the pan-Turkist/Turanist wing of Union and Progress.

During World War I Şakir was part of the leadership of the Special Organization. At the end of that war he was detained with other members of the CUP, first by a local Ottoman court martial and then by the British government. He was sent to Malta pending military trials for crimes against humanity, which never materialized, and was subsequently exchanged by Britain for hostages held by Turkish nationalist forces. On 17 April 1922, he was assassinated along with Cemal Azmi in Berlin.

== Early life ==
Bahaddin Şakir was born in Sliven, Ottoman Empire (now part of Bulgaria), into a Circassian family.

== Medical education and exile ==
After graduating from the School of Military Medicine as a medical captain in 1894, Şakir studied medical jurisprudence in France. In 1900, he became a judicial medical assistant at the same school. With Mustafa Hayrullah Diker, they became pioneers of this field of research. Şakir was also Şehzade Yusuf İzzeddin's private doctor in addition to his post in the hospital. He established relations with Ahmed Rıza and the members of the Committee of Union and Progress. For this he was exiled to Erzincan. Şakir was arrested there when authorities discovered that he sent aid to the committee and exiled him further to Trabzon. In 1905 he fled to Egypt and from there to Paris. In Paris he met Doctor Nazım and reconnected with Ahmet Rıza. In exile he wrote articles in the Şura-yı Ümmet.

Bahaddin Şakir was instrumental in reviving the CUP inside the Ottoman Empire (by the turn of the 20th century it was an organization of exiled intellectuals). He secretly traveled to Constantinople set the infrastructure for a new internal center for the organization. In 1906, the Ottoman Freedom Society would be founded, which merged with the CUP in 1907 and become its internal center for revolutionary activity.

== Second Constitutional Era ==
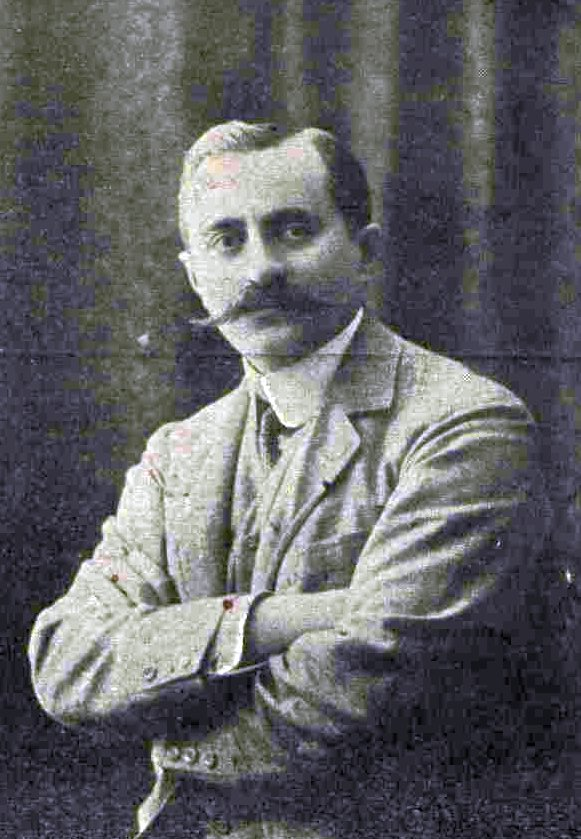
Portrait from the October 1909 issue of Servet-i Fünun

After the proclamation of the Second Constitutional Monarchy in 1908, Şakir returned to Constantinople and to his former duty at the School of Military Medicine. He wrote Turkey's first copyrighted textbook on forensic medicine. He became a professor on the subject at Haydarpaşa Faculty of Medicine, which was established in 1909 with the merging of military and civilian medical schools. The following year, Şakir was elected president of the medical school. He continued writing for the Şura-yı Ümmet. Meanwhile, he continued his journalism by harshly criticizing his opponents in his unsigned books titled Ali Kemal Davası (The Case of Ali Kemal) and "Kanuni Esasimizi İhlal Edenler" (Opponents of Our Constitution).

Bahaddin Şakir worked as the chief physician in Adrianople's (Edirne) hospital during its siege by the Bulgarians in the First Balkan War. He was captured and then released after the city's surrender.

He was then appointed head of the political department of the secret organization called Teşkilât-ı Mahsusa (Special Organization), which was established in 1913. In the same year, he was appointed to the Directorate of Forensic Medicine, which was established under the General Directorate of Health.

== Armenian genocide ==
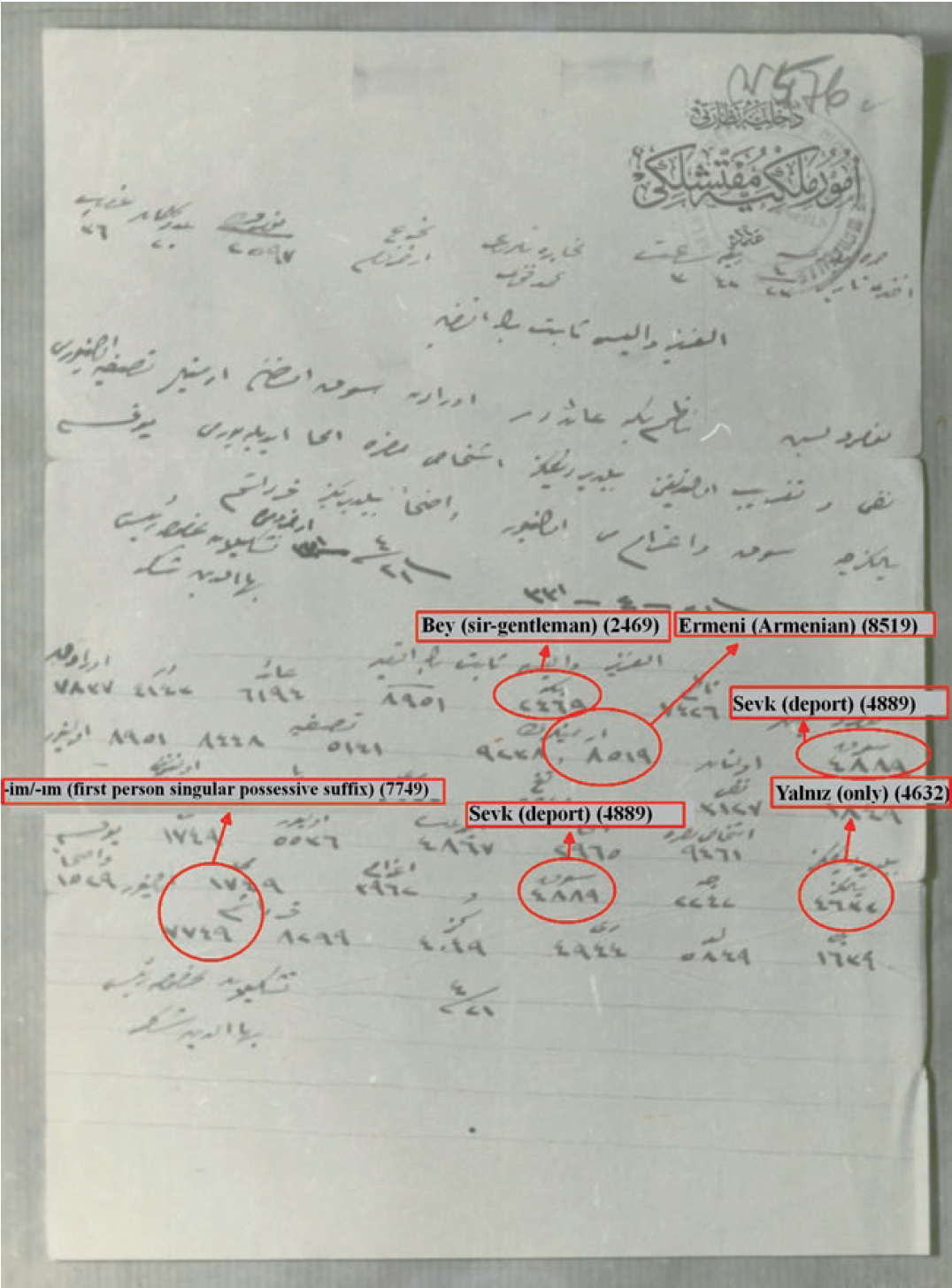
Encrypted telegram from Şakir dated 4 July 1915 found by Taner Akçam. He asks "Were the Armenians deported from there eliminated? Were those harmful elements removed through deportation liquidated or simply deported? Please be clear in your report, sir."

Bahaddin Şakir brought up deportations as a solution to the "Armenian question" in the CUP's 1910 congress. In 1915 he was able to put his vision to the test. As the central figure of Special Organization Şakir's organization was instrumental in enforced of the Tehcir law. For this, he has been described as "one of the architects" of the Armenian genocide. Halil Berktay writes that local governors objected to Şakir's deportation orders and called for his arrest. Dissidents were usually replaced by Unionist hardliners; sometimes twice if the replacement was not pliant. Şakir was involved in the subduing and deportation of the Armenian population in Ardanuç, where he was the head of the Special Organization, and Ardahan in 1914. On 3 March 1915, Şakir sent a letter stating

the Committee [of Union and Progress], as the bearer of the nation's honor, has decided to free the homeland from the inordinate ambitions of this accursed nation and to assume the responsibility for the blemish that will stain Ottoman history in this regard. The Committee, which cannot forget [the country's] bitter and unhappy history and whose cup runneth over with the unrelenting desire for revenge, has decided to annihilate all of Armenians living within Turkey, not to allow a single one to remain, and has given the government broad authority in this regard. On the question of how this killing and massacring will be carried out, the [central] government will give the necessary instructions to the provincial governors and army commanders. All of the Unionist regional representatives would concern themselves with following up on the matter in all of the places where they were found, and would ensure that not a single Armenian would receive protection or assistance.

Based on this letter, Turkish historian Taner Akçam concluded that the Armenian genocide must have been ordered prior to that date. In Ardanuç, Şakir was almost killed during the Turkish counterattack in the Van.

In 1916, Şakir and Provincial Governor Ahmed Muammer Bey issued orders to execute a labor battalion of 2,000 Turkish Armenian soldier. General Vehip Pasha was outraged by the massacre and ordered the courts-martial of Kör Nuri, the gendarmerie commander in charge of the labor battalions, and Çerkez Kadir, the brigand chief who carried out the killings. Both men were hanged. Vehip attempted to have Şakir and Muammer court-martialed. However, Şakir escaped arrest and Muammer was transferred out of Vehip's jurisdiction.

== Journey to Moscow ==
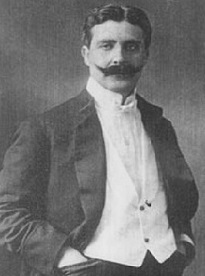
Portrait

With the Ottoman Empire's surrender, Şakir fled to Berlin via Sevastopol on a German torpedo boat with Enver Pasha, Jamal Pasha, Talat Pasha and four other high ranking Unionists. In absentia he was tried by the court nicknamed the "Nemrut Mustafa Divan" and was sentenced to death for waging war and massacring Armenians. From Berlin, Şakir, Cemal and Enver traveled to Moscow to get Bolshevik assistance for the Turks in their war for independence.

The journey there was troubled. Their first flight took off from the German border and crashed in the outskirts of Kaunas, Lithuania. Fortunately for the two of them they weren't recognized by journalists or the Allied forces stationed there until they were about to leave. Their return flight to Berlin also crashed. Enver's insistence to arrive to Moscow by plane costed them another plane crash in flight trials. Eventually Cemal Pasha joined them in Berlin, and using a plane that successfully passed flight tests they set off once again for Moscow. But hearing strange noises from the engine, Enver asked the pilot to turn back, and the plane disintegrated upon landing. While Enver was determined to make a grand entrance from the sky Şakir and Cemal gave up and instead joined a Russian prisoner of war convoy heading back to their homeland. After several more bizarre mishaps Enver finally met the two of them at Moscow (he came by land in the end).

Şakir participated in the Congress of the Peoples of the East, which was held in Baku in September 1920. He was the Baku representative of the Union of Islamic Revolutionary Societies (İslam İhtilal Cemiyetleri İttihadı). After attending the congress of the organization held in Moscow in the spring of 1921, he returned to Germany.

== Assassination of Bahaeddin Şakir ==
In the autumn of 1919, the Armenian Revolutionary Federation (ARF) decided to punish the executors of the Armenian Genocide. Under Operation Nemesis, Aram Yerganian and Arshavir Shirakian were given the task to assassinate Cemal Azmi and Şakir who were both in Berlin. On 17 April 1922, Shirakian and Yerganian encountered Azmi and Şakir walking with their families on Uhlandstraße. Shirakian managed to kill Azmi and wound Şakir. Yerganian immediately ran after Şakir and killed him with a shot to his head. The assassins were never detained.

== Legacy ==
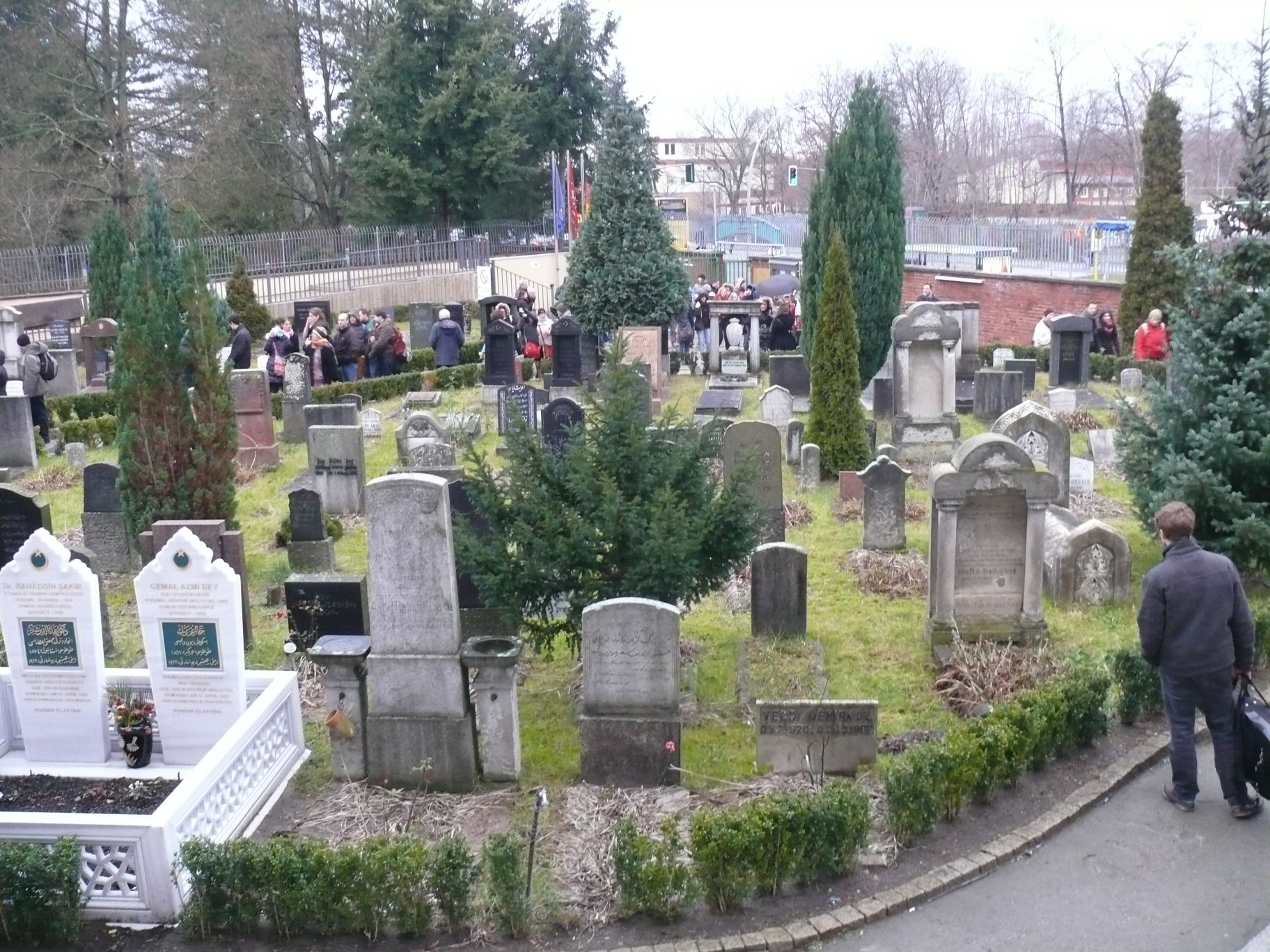
Graves honoring Armenian Genocide perpetrators Şakir and Cemal Azmi in the cemetery of Şehitlik Mosque in Berlin (foreground left).

Şakir and Azmi were buried in the cemetery of Şehitlik Mosque in Berlin.

In 1926, the Republic of Turkey granted the families of those killed in Operation Nemesis a pension fund. Bahaddin Şakir was also included in the list accepted by the assembly, along with Talat, Azmi, Said Halim Pasha, Cemal Pasha, and his aides Süreyya and Nusret.

His life was published as a book by Hikmet Çiçek in 2004 called Dr. Bahattin Şakir: İttihat ve Terakki’den Teşkilatı Mahsusa’ya Bir Türk Jakobeni (Dr. Bahattin Şakir: a Turkish Jacobin from Union and Progress to the Special Organization).

In 2005, Kurdish-German politician Giyasettin Sayan brought up their "graves of honour" and Armenian genocide denial in a session of parliament.

== Sources ==
- Akçam, Taner (2007), A Shameful Act, London: Macmillan
- Hofmann, Tessa (2020). "A Hundred Years Ago: The Assassination of Mehmet Talaat (15 March 1921) and the Berlin Criminal Proceedings against Soghomon Tehlirian (2/3 June 1921): Background, Context, Effect" (PDF). International Journal of Armenian Genocide Studies. 5 (1): 67–90. doi:10.51442/ijags.0009. ISSN 1829-4405.
- Hanioğlu, M. Şükrü (2008). A Brief History of the Late Ottoman Empire. Princeton.
