= Doctor Nâzım =

Turkish physician, politician, and genocide perpetrator

Dr. Mehmed Nâzım
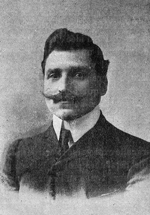

Minister of Education
- In office 21 July 1918 – 8 October 1918
- Monarch: Mehmed VI
- Prime Minister: Talat Pasha
- Preceded by: Ali Münif Yeğenağa
- Succeeded by: Gelenbevizade Mehmet Said

Secretary General of the Union and Progress Party
- In office 23 July 1909 – 23 July 1910

Personal details
- Born: 1870 Selanik, Salonica Vilayet, Ottoman Empire
- Died: 26 August 1926 (aged 55/56) Ankara, Turkey
- Cause of death: Execution by hanging
- Spouse: Evliyazade Beria Hanım
- Education: Imperial School of Medicine; Sorbonne University

Selanikli Mehmed Nâzım Bey also known as Doctor Nâzım (1870 – 26 August 1926) was a Turkish physician, politician, and a Young Turk revolutionary. Nâzım Bey was a founding member of the Committee of Union and Progress, and served on its central committee for over ten years. He played a significant role in the Armenian genocide and the expulsion of Greeks in Western Anatolia. He was convicted for allegedly conspiring to assassinate Mustafa Kemal Atatürk in İzmir and was hanged in Ankara on 26 August 1926. He also served as the chairman of the Turkish sports club Fenerbahçe S.K. between 1916 and 1918.

== Early life ==
According to some claims, he was born in 1872 to a Dönmeh family. Other sources elaborate that not his own family, but the Evliyâzade family, of which he was the son-in-law, had Dönmeh origins. Mehmed Nâzım was raised in Salonica; his family were longtime residents of the city, and were successful in running various businesses. His father Hacı Abdülhamid Efendi was from a Vardar (Macedonian Turkish) clan and died while he was a baby. His mother was Ayşe Hanım.

== Agitating against Abdul Hamid II ==
After completing his secondary school education in Salonica, Nâzım entered the Istanbul Military Medical High School in 1885 at the age of 15. After three years of education in this school, he entered the Military Medicine Academy. Influenced by the writings of Namık Kemal, he founded the Society of Ottoman Union in the academy on 4 June 1889 with a group of friends, and took active roles in the society in its early years. While continuing his education, in 1893, together with his classmates Ahmet Verdani and Ali Zühtü Bey, he went to Paris to establish connection with Ahmet Rıza's Young Turk faction, and united the two societies there and established the "Ottoman Progress and Union Committee" (later known as the Committee of Union and Progress) (CUP). Ahmed Rıza became the society's first president, and on 1 December 1895 Nâzım helped Rıza to debut the newspaper Meşveret, which criticized Sultan Abdul Hamid II's regime, advocating for a democratic and secular "French style" of government and society instead.

The future of the Young Turks was put in jeopardy in 1896, when Abdul Hamid found out of a planned coup d'état by the Unionists. While a massive crackdown on opposition took place in Constantinople, Yıldız Palace also put European governments under heavy pressure to deport the Young Turks. The French government affirmed the Porte's demands of deporting the Unionists, who settled in Switzerland after being deported from Belgium also. Rıza lost his chairmanship to Mizancı Murad during this time, who expelled Nâzım and Rıza from the organization, but Rıza returned to the CUP chairmanship after Murad and several other Young Turks defected and returned to Constantinople to accept a pardon from Abdul Hamid. Nâzım and Rıza's CUP eventually returned to Paris in 1899 with more personnel and capital than before.

With Prince Sabahaddin's flight to Paris to join the Young Turks, a division surfaced in a 1902 congress that split the group between federalists and nationalists. An imperial firman declared Doctor Nâzım a traitor and sentenced him to death at this time for his role in Meşveret.

Outside of politics, Nâzım enrolled in the Medical Faculty of Sorbonne University and completed his education in 1895. He became a gynecologist and started working at the Paris Hospital.

== Lead up to 1908 ==
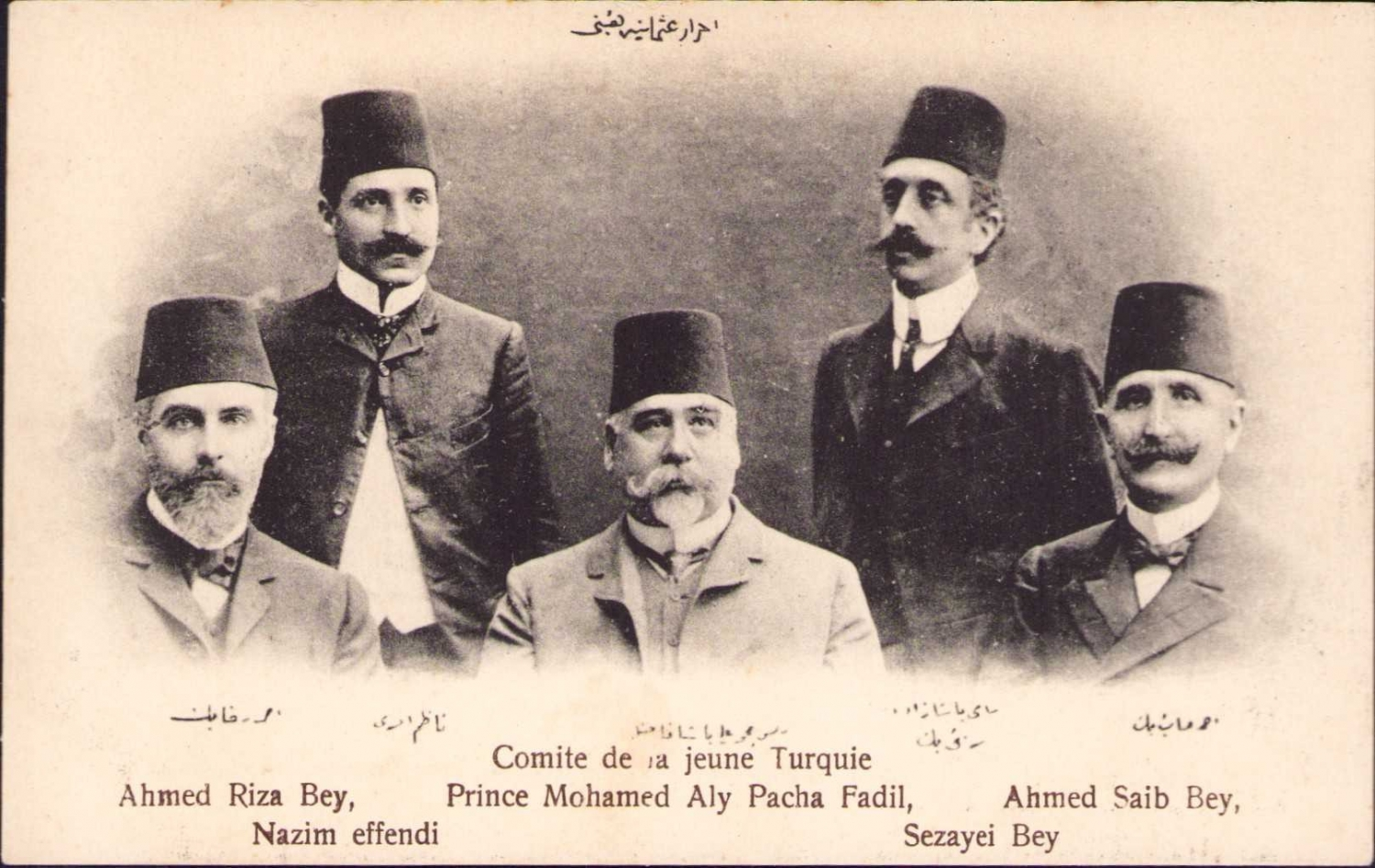
Proclaimers the Second Constitutional Monarchy in 1909 Doctor Nâzım, Ahmed Rıza, Prince Mehmet Ali Pasha, Ahmed Saib, Samipaşazade Sezai

Nâzım secretly returned to the Ottoman Empire and with Bahattin Şakir they organized CUP branches in Salonica and Smyrna with the aim to start a revolution. Staying in Midhat Şükrü's house in Salonica, Nâzım was instrumental in the 1907 merger between the CUP and Ottoman Freedom Committee, led by Talat Bey. In Smyrna, he opened a shop that was a front for anti-Hamidian propaganda. He met with Mehmet Tahir, Halil Menteşe, gendarme commander Eşref Kuşçubaşı, and Çakırcalı Mehmet Efe in the lead up to 1908 revolution. When the revolution kicked off with Niyazi and Enver's flight into Albanian foothills, the Smyrna army corps was sent to Salonica to put down the revolt, but upon landing in the Salonican docks they defected in favor of the Young Turk revolutionaries. By July 23, Abdul Hamid II capitulated to the revolutionaries, and proclaimed the Second Constitutional Monarchy. Nâzım heard the news of the revolution when he was at Milas and rushed to Salonica to gave a speech from the balcony of the London Hotel.

== Balkan Wars ==
Following the revolution, Nâzım became a permanent member of the CUP's Central Committee while also continuing his medicinal career as the Chief Physician of the Municipal Hospital of Salonica, and was affiliated with the Red Crescent. He was offered general director of Anatolian Vilayets, but declined administrative work. With the CUP being suppressed after the 1912 coup d'état, Nâzım laid low in Salonica, but was taken prisoner by the Greeks on 9 November when they occupied the city during the First Balkan War. He was imprisoned in an Athens prison as a Turkish nationalist, only being repatriated two months before the start of World War I after the CUP reclaimed power and pressured the Greek government. The guards abused him and told him that his family had been killed, and that Constantinople was already occupied, while Anatolia would soon fall to the Greeks. He was deeply troubled by his family's fate (and that of his baby daughter) and the exile from his hometown. Upon returning, he called attention to Bulgarian komitadji atrocities committed against Muslims and "call[ed] for vengeance against the remaining Ottoman Christians" in his newspaper articles . The Ottoman defeat and the ethnic cleansing of Muslims was traumatic for many Young Turks and led to a desire for revenge; Nâzım's "transformation from a patriotic doctor into a rabid, vindictive nationalist... symbolized the fate of many others".

== World War I ==
Doctor Nâzım's return led to his concern that the Turks were economically poor here. He organized economic congresses and encouraged entrepreneurship. He established a collective grocery company in Rumelihisarı. Although he wanted to join the army to fight, it was found more appropriate he remained in the central committee. Sources don't agree on whether Nâzım supported joining World War I or staying neutral. Upon the suggestions of Dr. Hamid Hüsnü (Kayacan), a close friend and former president of Fenerbahçe, with whom he worked with during their exile in Paris Nâzım became president of Fenerbahçe Sports Club between 1915 and 1916. Later, together with Celâl Sahir (Erozan), he first published the "Halka Doğru" magazine in Smyrna and helped in the establishment of the Turkish Hearths.

On July 21, 1918, Talat Pasha insisted Nâzım join his cabinet, which he reluctantly did as Minister of Education. Nâzım meticulously protected state property and was never transported by the car reserved for cabinet members.

== Role in the Armenian genocide ==
Nâzım was a leading figure in the Turkification of the Ottoman Empire. He was a member of the Teşkilât-ı Mahsusa (Special Organization in the Ottoman Empire). Many members of this organization eventually participated in the Turkish national movement and had played special roles in the Armenian Genocide.

In a speech delivered on during the closing remarks of a Committee of Union and Progress meeting, Nâzım said:

If we remain satisfied with the sort of local massacres which took place in Adana and elsewhere in 1909...if this purge is not general and final, it will inevitably lead to problems. Therefore, it is absolutely necessary to eliminate the Armenian people in its entirety, so there is no further Armenian on this earth and the very concept of Armenia is extinguished.

And continued by saying, "the procedure this time will be one of total annihilation-it is necessary that not even one single Armenian survive this annihilation".

During one of the secret meetings of the Young Turks, Nâzım was quoted as saying, "The massacre is necessary. All the non-Turkish elements, whatever nation they belong to, should be exterminated". In February 1915, two months prior to the commencement of the Armenian Genocide, Nâzım declared a new government policy which would "produce total annihilation" in which would be "essential that no Armenian survives". He has been noted to have said that the Ottoman Empire should be "freeing the fatherland of the aspirations of this cursed race" when referring to the Armenians.

== Exile in Russia and Germany ==
Doctor Nâzım was one of the eight Unionists that fled the Ottoman Empire on a German torpedo boat on 2 November 1918 following the signing of the Mudros Armistice. Due to his role in the Armenian genocide, Nâzım was sentenced to death in absentia by the Turkish Courts-Martial of 1919–1920, but this was never carried out due to him having fled to Berlin. While in Berlin, he participated in the establishment of the Society of Islamic Revolutions, an anti-Entente Islamist organization. When he learned that Enver Pasha had been arrested by the Bolsheviks, he went to Moscow and after negotiating his release from prison, he returned to Berlin to open an office to support the Turkish nationalists led by Mustafa Kemal Atatürk in their fight against Entente forces. He went to Moscow and Batumi in 1921, where he carried out the work of the Islamic Revolution Society. Nâzım convinced Enver Pasha from entering Anatolia and becoming an opponent of Mustafa Kemal Pasha. Meanwhile, he too wrote to Mustafa Kemal Pasha multiple times that he wished to return to Anatolia to help the Turkish revolutionaries but did not get a response.

He met with Djemal Pasha in Çarçu and worked to organize the Turks of Bukhara with Enver and also told Djemal to convince the Soviets to support the Turkish nationalists. Hearing the news that the Turks won the Battle of Sakarya, he and Enver Pasha parted ways. Nâzım then lived in Germany for a while with police protection due to his fellow Unionists Talat Pasha, Sait Halim Pasha, Bahattin Şakir, Cemal Azmi and Cemal Pasha, being assassinated by Armenian Dashnaks (see Operation Nemesis). He tried to have a bust of Talat Pasha made following his assassination. With the help of his close friend, Nâzım Hikmet, he began to write his memoirs, but he could not complete them or publish them.

== Last years ==
After the recapture of Smyrna by the Turks, he was allowed to return to Turkey provided that he did not engage in political activities. Returning in 1922, he continued meeting with former Unionists, especially with his brother-in-law the Foreign Minister Dr. Tevfik Rüştü Aras.

On 17 June 1926 Doctor Nâzım was among the Unionists arrested for being accused of organizing a plot against Mustafa Kemal's life in Smyrna. He was brought to Ankara after he was arrested on 1 July, and was tried by the Ankara Independence Tribunal. He denied the allegations against him, saying that he had no knowledge or guilt about this incident. No questions were asked about his involvement in the alleged assassination, and he was questioned throughout the court only about his activities during the period of Unionist rule. The following crimes were attributed to him by the court board and the prosecution's indictment:

- Working abroad with Enver Pasha against the Ankara Government in a secret organization during the armistice years as well as participation in the Batumi Congress.
- Attending the meeting held at Cavit Bey's house.
- Providing material and moral support to the Progressive Republican Party and to write a letter to Şükrü Bey about the election results in İzmir.

He was sentenced to death for the third time of his life and was executed by hanging at Cebeci on Thursday night, 26 August 1926.

== Personal life ==
Mehmed Nâzım met Beria Hanım, the daughter of Refik Bey of the Evliyazade family in Smyrna, and later married her in 1909.
