= Şûrâ-yı Ümmet =

Ottoman Turkish political periodical (1902–1910)

- Categories: Political magazine
- Frequency: Biweekly; Weekly
- Founder: Ahmet Rıza
- Founded: 1902
- First issue: 10 April 1902
- Final issue: 12 May 1910
- Language: Ottoman Turkish

Şûrâ-yı Ümmet (Ottoman Turkish: Council of the [Islamic] Community) was one of the official media outlets of the Committee of Union and Progress (CUP). The magazine existed between 1902 and 1910. It was one of the most influential publications of the CUP members and played a significant role in the Young Turk Revolution in 1908.

== History and profile ==
The establishment of Şûrâ-yı Ümmet was decided in the meeting of the CUP members in Paris in February 1902. Its title was given by Hoca Kadri Efendi, and it was first published as a biweekly magazine on 10 April that year. The founders were part of the CUP faction led by Ahmet Rıza. But, other factions of the organization also contributed to the establishment of the magazine. They adopted an inclusive Ottomanist approach in opposition to nationalist approach which was represented by another CUP group who started Türk magazine in Cairo. They also supported the idea that Anatolia was the motherland of Turks.

Ahmed Sâib was the founding editor-in-chief of the magazine which was headquartered in Paris and was published in Cairo until 1 July 1907. In July 1906 Samipaşazade Sezai replaced Ahmed Sâib as editor-in-chief. It became an official publication of the CUP with the issue 98 dated 15 August 1906 and began to cover the CUP news and announcements. The magazine featured a detailed summary of the Vyborg Manifesto issued by the Duma deputies in July 1906. Şûrâ-yı Ümmet was sent and read in different regions of the Ottoman Empire, including Macedonia.

Following the revolution in 1908 the headquarters of Şûrâ-yı Ümmet was moved to Istanbul, and there it was restarted as a newspaper in November 1908. Its license holder was Bahaeddin Şakir, and Samipaşazade Sezai continued to serve as its editor-in-chief. However, Şûrâ-yı Ümmet did not manage to gain success in its newspaper format, and therefore, was redesigned as a weekly political, social, and literary magazine in October 1909. Its official affiliation with the CUP ended in this phase. Cenâb Şehâbeddîn was named as its editor-in-chief, and Mehmed Cavid, finance minister of the period, Hüseyin Cahit, Mahmud Sadık, Ubeydullah Efendi and İsmail Hakkı became the members of its editorial board.

The final issue of Şûrâ-yı Ümmet was published on 12 May 1910, and it produced a total of 220 issues during its run.

== Contributors ==
Major contributors included Rıza Tevfik, Nazım Bey, Ali Haydar Midhat and Mustafa Hamdi during the Paris period. Yusuf Akçura published articles in the magazine in 1905. Fatma Aliye contributed to Şûrâ-yı Ümmet when it was published in Istanbul.
