= Kandilli Anatolian High School for Girls =

- Kandilli Kız Anadolu Lisesi

Location
- Kandilli Cad. Liseli Sok. 1 Kandilli, Istanbul, 34684; Turkey; 41°04′17″N 29°03′26″E

Information
- Type: Public Anatolian High School
- Established: 1916; 110 years ago
- Founder: Ahmed Rıza
- Gender: Girls
- Website: www.kkl.k12.tr

Kandilli Anatolian High School for Girls (Turkish: Kandilli Kız Anadolu Lisesi) is a secondary educational institution located in the Kandilli neighborhood of Üsküdar district in Istanbul, Turkey. Known traditionally as Kandilli Kız Lisesi, it is one of the oldest girls' high schools of the country and a top-level Anatolian High School.

== History ==
The prominent Young Turk activist, statesman, educational reformer Ahmed Rıza and her sister Selma Rıza intended the school to be opened as early as the first decade of the 20th century as the first public girls' high school in the Ottoman Empire, as the girls branch of the Galatasaray High School, but the Balkan Wars, the Italo-Turkish War, and World War I prevented this project from happening. The Ottoman princess Adile Sultan had donated her summer residence, the Adile Sultan Palace, to the state shortly before her death in 1899 under the condition that it be turned into a secondary school for girls. The residence had been constructed upon orders of her brother, Sultan Abdülaziz (reigned 1861–76) on an unregistered date.

Ahmed Rıza finally succeeded in opening the school in 1916 under the name Adile Sultan İnas Mekteb-i Sultanisi ("Adile Sultan Imperial Girls School") in Kandilli, on the Asian bank of the Bosphorus in the Adile Sultan Palace building. The first graduates left the school in 1920. The school was renamed in 1924 after its location, becoming the Kandilli Secondary School. In 1931, the school took on its present name Kandilli High School for Girls (later becoming a public Anatolian High School), and has been a respected educational institution since then.

The classes of the high school moved to a new building in 1969. The old Adile Sultan Palace was used as dormitory for boarding girls of the school until 1986, when it burned down due to an electrical short-circuit. The historic building became a ruin consisting of only four walls. Soon afterwards, some alumni of Kandilli High School established a foundation, and raised funds to rebuild the palace. Due to lacking funds, however, the former building was only restored and opened again in 2006 upon a donation from billionaire businessman and philanthropist Sakıp Sabancı as a cultural center unaffiliated with the high school.
