= Istanbul trials of 1919–1920 =

Courts-martial of the Ottoman Empire

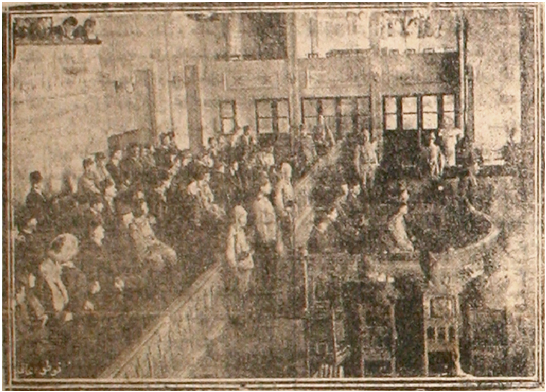
A court session of the Turkish courts-martial of 1919–20. The CUP's leaders, Enver, Djemal, Talaat and Mustafa Kemal (Atatürk) among others, were ultimately sentenced to death under charges of wartime profiteering, and massacres of both Armenians and Greeks.

The Constantinople or Istanbul trials of 1919–1920 (Ottoman Turkish: عالیه دیوانِ حربِ عرفی. Âliye Divan-ı Harb-i Örfi) were courts-martial of the Ottoman Empire that occurred soon after the Armistice of Mudros, in the aftermath of World War I, and part of the larger movement to prosecute Ottoman war criminals.

The government of Tevfik Pasha decided to prosecute crimes of Ottoman officials, committed primarily against the Armenian population, in national courts. On 23 November 1918, Sultan Mehmed VI created a government commission of inquiry, and Hasan Mazhar Bey was appointed chairman. The formation of a military tribunal investigating the crimes of the Committee of Union and Progress (CUP) was a continuation of the work of the Mazhar commission, and on 16 December 1918, the Sultan officially established such tribunals. Three military tribunals and ten provincial courts were created. The tribunals came to be known as "Nemrud's court", after Mustafa "Nemrud" Pasha Yamulki.

The leadership of the CUP and selected former officials were charged with several offences including subversion of the constitution, wartime profiteering, and the massacres of both Armenians and Greeks. The court reached a verdict which sentenced the organizers of the massacres – Talat, Enver, and Cemal – and others to death. All those sentenced to death were sent a fatwa from the Sheikh al-Islam in the name of Mehmed VI before their execution, as the law stipulated that a Muslim could not be executed without a fatwa from the Sultan-Caliph.

These trials and fatwas also served as means for Mehmed VI to express his disapproval of the accused and legitimize his position, both in relation to his domestic situation with the Muslims in his empire, in the face of the Western powers that emerged victorious in World War I, and to anti-absolutist politicians.

Since there were no international laws in place under which they could be tried, the men who orchestrated the massacres escaped prosecution and traveled relatively freely throughout Germany, Italy, and Central Asia. That led to the Armenian Revolutionary Federation's launch of Operation Nemesis, a covert operation conducted by Armenians during which Ottoman political and military figures who fled prosecution were assassinated for their role in the Armenian genocide.

In 1920, the courts-martial also sentenced Mustafa Kemal and many of his associates to death in absentia for massacres against civilians, among other crimes. However, they were later forced to shut down during the resurgence of the Turkish National Movement under Kemal. The war criminals who remained serving their sentences were ultimately pardoned under the newly-established Kemalist government on 31 March 1923.

== Background ==
=== World War I ===
Following the reportage by US Ambassador to the Ottoman Empire Henry Morgenthau, Sr. of the Armenian resistance during the Armenian genocide at the city of Van, the Triple Entente formally warned the Ottoman Empire on 24 May 1915 that:

In view of these new crimes of Turkey against humanity and civilization, the Allied Governments announce publicly to the Sublime Porte that they will hold personally responsible for these crimes all members of the Ottoman Government, as well as those of their agents who are implicated in such massacres".

In the months leading up to the end of World War I, the Ottoman Empire had undergone major restructuring. In July 1918, Sultan Mehmed V died and was succeeded by his half-brother Mehmed VI. The Ministers of the Committee of Union and Progress (CUP), including the Three Pashas who ran the Ottoman Government between 1913 and 1918, had resigned from office and fled the country soon afterwards. Successful Allied offensives in Salonika posed a direct threat to the Ottoman capital of Constantinople. Sultan Mehmed VI appointed Ahmed Izzet Pasha to the position of Grand Vizier and tasked him with the assignment of seeking an armistice with the Allied Powers and ending Ottoman involvement in the war.

On 30 October 1918, an armistice was signed between the Ottomans, represented by the Minister of the Navy Rauf Orbay, and the Allies, represented by British Admiral Sir Somerset Gough-Calthorpe. The armistice essentially ended Ottoman participation in the war and required the Empire's forces to stand down although there still remained approximately one million soldiers in the field and smallscale fighting continued in the frontier provinces into November 1918.

=== Surrender of Constantinople ===
In November 1918, Britain appointed Admiral Sir Somerset Gough-Calthorpe as High Commissioner and Rear-Admiral Richard Webb as Assistant High Commissioner in Constantinople. A French brigade later entered Constantinople on 12 November 1918, and British troops first entered the city on 13 November 1918. Early in December in 1918, Allied troops occupied sections of Constantinople and set up a military administration.

The US Secretary of State Robert Lansing summoned the representatives of the Ottoman Empire, Sultan Mehmed VI and Grand Vizier Damat Ferid Pasha (a founding member of the Freedom and Accord Party). The Paris Peace Conference established "The Commission on Responsibilities and Sanctions" in January 1919.

On 2 January 1919, Gough-Calthorpe requested from the Foreign Office authority to obtain the arrest and handing over of all those responsible for the incessant breaches of the terms of the Armistice and the continued ill-treatment of Armenians. Calthorpe got together a staff of dedicated assistants, including a notable anti-Turkish Irishman, Andrew Ryan, later Sir, who in 1951 published his memoirs. In his new role as the chief Dragoman of the British High Commission and Second Political Officer, he found himself in charge of the Armenian question. He proved instrumental in the arrest of a large number of the (later to be) Malta deportees. These fell broadly into three categories: Those still breaching the terms of the armistice, those who had allegedly ill-treated Allied prisoners-of-war and those responsible for excesses against Armenians, in Turkey itself and the Caucasus. Calthorpe asked for a personal interview with Reshid Pasha, Ottoman Minister of Foreign Affairs, to impress on him how Britain viewed the Armenian affair and the ill-treatment of POWs as "most important" deserving "the utmost attention". Two days later Calthorpe formally requested the arrest of seven leaders of the CUP. While between 160 and 200 people were arrested, another 60 suspected of participating in the massacre of Armenians remained at large.

== Courts-martial ==
=== Establishment ===
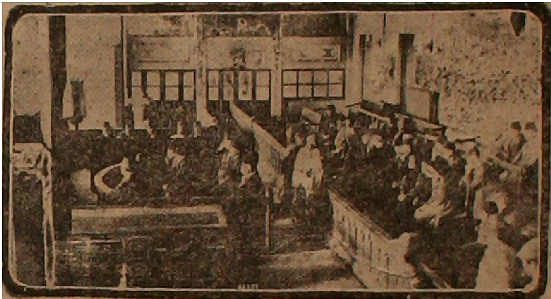
A session of the Turkish courts-martial on 3 April 1919

The courts-martial were established on 28 April 1919 while the Paris Peace Conference was ongoing. An inquiry commission was established, called the "Mazhar Inquiry Commission", which was invested with extraordinary powers of subpoena, arrest, etc., through which the war criminals were summoned to trial. This organization secured Ottoman documents from many provinces of the Ottoman Empire. Mehmet VI and Damat Ferid Pasha, as representatives of the Ottoman Empire were summoned to the Paris Peace Conference. On 11 July 1919, Ferid Pasha officially confessed to massacres against the Armenians in the Ottoman Empire and was a key figure and initiator of the war crime trials held directly after World War I to condemn to death the chief perpetrators of the genocide.

The Ottoman Government in Constantinople (represented by Ferid Pasha), foisted the blame on a few members of the CUP and long-time rivals of his own Freedom and Accord Party, which would ensure that the Ottoman Empire received a more lenient treatment during the Paris Peace Conference. The trials helped the Freedom and Accord Party root out the CUP from the political arena. On 23 July 1919, during the Erzurum Congress, General Kâzım Karabekir was issued a direct order from the Sultanate to place Mustafa Kemal Pasha (Atatürk) and Rauf (Orbay) under arrest and assume Kemal's position as Inspector-General of the Eastern Provinces. He defied the government in Constantinople and refused to carry out the arrest.

At that time Turkey had two competing governments in Istanbul and Ankara. The government in Istanbul supported the Turkish trials with more or less seriousness depending on the current government. While Ferid Pasha (4 March – 2 October 1919 and again 5 April – 21 October 1920) stood behind the prosecuting body, the government of Ali Riza Pasha (2 October 1919 – 2 March 1920) barely made a mention of the legal proceedings against the war criminals. The trials had also blurred the crime of participation in the Turkish National Movement with the crime of the Armenian genocide, and ultimately resulted in increasing support for the government in Ankara that would be led later on by Atatürk.

=== Procedure ===
The court sat for nearly a year, from April 1919 through March 1920, although it became clear after just a few months that the tribunal was simply going through the motions. The judges had condemned the first set of defendants (Enver, et al.) when they were safely out of the country, but the Tribunal, despite making a great show of its efforts, had no intention of returning convictions. Admiral Gough-Calthorpe protested to the Sublime Porte, took the trials out of Turkish hands, and moved the proceedings to Malta. There an attempt was made to seat an international tribunal, but the Turks bungled the investigations and mishandled the documentary evidence so that nothing of their work could be used by the international court.

According to European Court of Human Rights judge Giovanni Bonello, "quite likely the British found the continental inquisitorial system of penal procedure used in Turkey repugnant to its own paths to criminal justice and doubted the propriety of relying on it". Or, possibly, the Turkish government never came round to hand over the incriminating documents used by the military courts. Whatever the reason, with the advent of power of Atatürk, all the documents on which the Turkish military courts had based their trials and convictions, were "lost". Admiral John de Robeck replaced Admiral Gough-Calthorpe on 5 August 1919 as "Commander in Chief, Mediterranean, and High Commissioner, at Constantinople". In August 1920, the proceedings were halted, and Admiral John de Robeck informed London of the futility of continuing the tribunal with the remark: "Its findings cannot be held of any account at all."

An investigative committee started by Hasan Mazhar was immediately tasked to gather evidence and testimonies, with a special effort to obtain inquiries on civil servants implicated in massacres committed against Armenians. According to genocide scholar Vahakn Dadrian, the Commission worked in accordance with sections 47, 75 and 87 of the Ottoman Code of Criminal Procedure. It had extensive investigative powers, because it was not only limited to conduct legal proceedings and search for and seize documents, but also to arrest and imprison suspects with assistance from the Criminal Investigation Department, and other State services. In a course of three months, the committee managed to gather 130 documents and files pertaining to the massacres, and had them transferred to the courts-martial.

Turkish courts-martial also had some cases of high-ranking Ottoman officials, who were assassinated by agents of the CUP in 1915, for disobeying criminal orders of the central government to deport and eliminate the Armenian civilian population of the Ottoman Empire.

=== Verdicts ===
On 8 April 1919, Mehmed Kemal, former Kaymakam of Boğazlıyan, Yozgat, was sentenced to death and hanged on 10 April 1919. Prior to their executions, every condemned individual received a fatwa issued by the Shaykh al-Islam in the name of Mehmed VI, in accordance with the legal requirement that no Muslim could be put to death without such a decree from the Sultan-Caliph.

These legal proceedings and accompanying fatwas also functioned as vehicles for Mehmed VI to manifest his dissent towards the condemned individuals and justify his position, both within the context of his domestic affairs concerning the Muslim population within his empire and in response to the Western powers that had emerged victorious in World War I.

Abdullah Avni, the commander of the gendarmerie in Erzincan was sentenced to death during the Erzincan trials and hanged on 22 April 1920.

Behramzade Nusret, the Kaymakam of Bayburt, was sentenced to death on 20 July 1920 and hanged on 5 August 1920.

On 5 July 1919, the court reached a verdict which sentenced the organizers of the massacres, Talaat, Enver, Cemal and others to death. The military court found that it was the intent of the CUP to eliminate the Armenians physically, via its Special Organization. The pronouncement reads as follows:

The Court Martial taking into consideration the above-named crimes declares, unanimously, the culpability as principal factors of these crimes the fugitives Talaat Pasha, former Grand Vizir, Enver Efendi, former War Minister, struck off the register of the Imperial Army, Cemal Efendi, former Navy Minister, struck off too from the Imperial Army, and Dr. Nazim Efendi, former Minister of Education, members of the General Council of the Union & Progress, representing the moral person of that party;... the Court Martial pronounces, in accordance with said stipulations of the Law the death penalty against Talaat, Enver, Cemal, and Dr. Nazim.

Excerpt from the first page of the Ottoman court-martial's death sentence against Mustafa Kemal published in the 13 May 1920 issue of Ottoman newspaper Peyâm-ı Sabah. Mustafa Kemal and his associates were convicted of massacres against innocent civilians, destruction of villages/towns, torture, pillage, property seizures and more.

The courts-martial officially disbanded the CUP and confiscated its assets and the assets of those found guilty. Two of the three Pashas who fled were later assassinated by Armenian vigilantes during Operation Nemesis.

=== Mustafa Kemal ===
In May 1920, the court-martial also sentenced Mustafa Kemal and several of his associates and other leaders of the Turkish National Movement to death in absentia under Articles 45, 55 and 56 of the Ottoman Penal Code and also ordered the confiscation of their property as well. The judgment convicted them, among other things, of torture, pillage, property seizure, destroying villages and towns, committing massacres against innocent civilians, and other crimes.

The decision was reached in 11 May 1920 and published in Peyâm-ı Sabah on 13 May.

== Detention in Malta and aftermath ==
Ottoman military members and high-ranking politicians convicted by the Turkish courts-martial were transferred from Constantinople prisons to the Crown Colony of Malta on board of the SS Princess Ena and the SS HMS Benbow by the British forces, starting in 1919. Admiral Sir Somerset Gough-Calthorpe was in charge of the operation, together with Lord Curzon; they did so owing to the lack of transparency of the Turkish courts-martial. They were held there for three years, while searches were made of archives in Constantinople, London, Paris and Washington to find a way to put them in trial. However, the war criminals were eventually released without trial and returned to Constantinople in 1921, in exchange for 22 British prisoners of war held by the government in Ankara, including a relative of Lord Curzon. The government in Ankara was opposed to political power of the government in Constantinople. They are often mentioned as the Malta exiles in some sources.

According to European Court of Human Rights judge Giovanni Bonello the suspension of prosecutions, the repatriation and release of Turkish detainees was amongst others a result of the lack of an appropriate legal framework with supranational jurisdiction, because following World War I no international norms for regulating war crimes existed, due to a legal vacuum in international law; therefore contrary to Turkish sources, no trials were ever held in Malta. He mentions that the release of the Turkish detainees was accomplished in exchange for 22 British prisoners held by Mustafa Kemal Atatürk.

=== Punishment ===
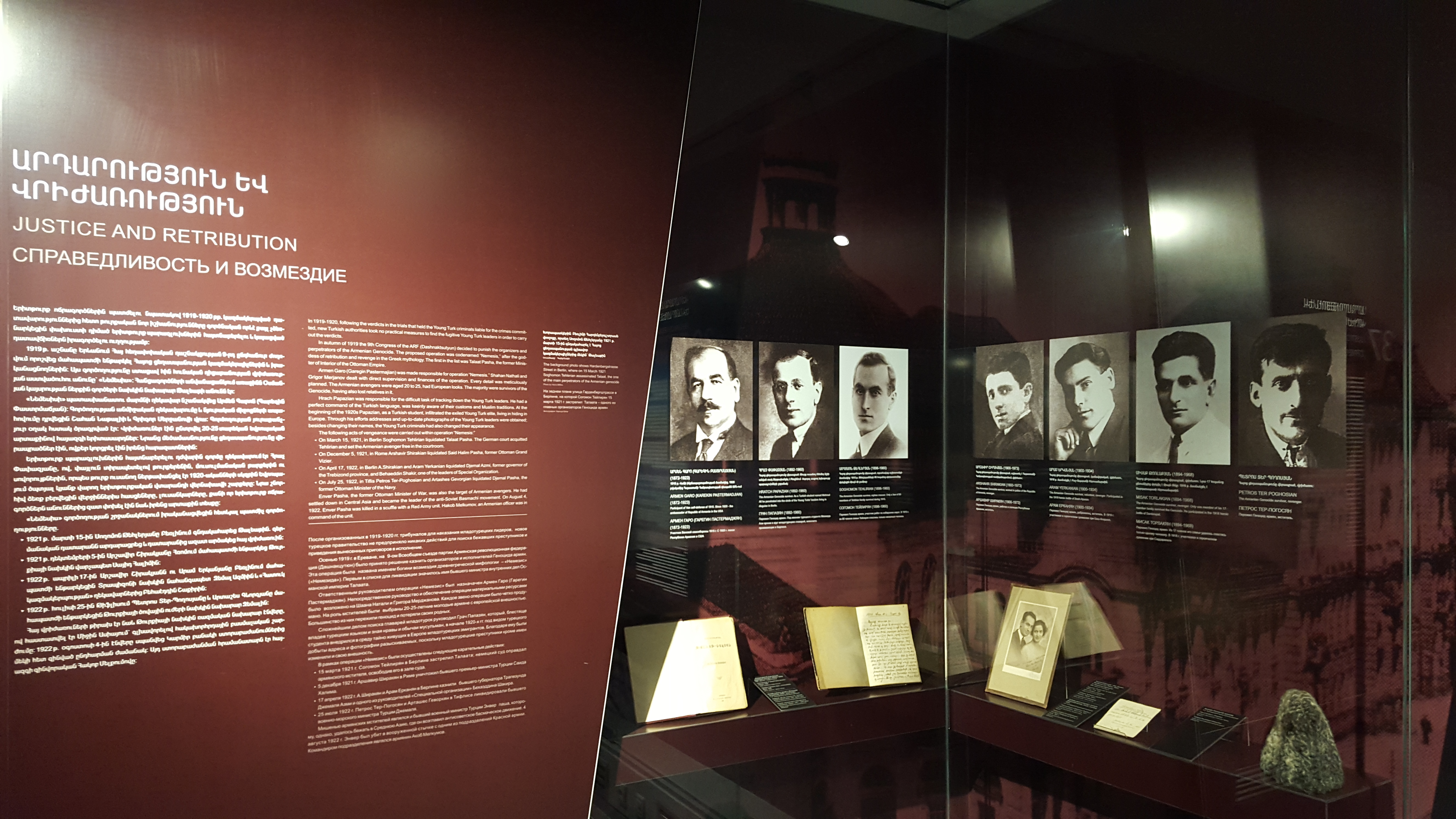
An exhibition dedicated to Operation Nemesis at the genocide museum in Yerevan, Armenia

At the Armenian Revolutionary Federation's 9th General Congress, which convened in Yerevan from 27 September, to the end of October 1919, the issue of retribution against those personally responsible for organizing the genocide was on the agenda. A task force, led by Shahan Natalie, working with Grigor Merjanov, was established to assassinate Talaat Pasha, Javanshir Khan, Said Halim Pasha, Behaeddin Shakir Bey, Jemal Azmi, Cemal Pasha, Enver Pasha, as well as several Armenian collaborators, in a secret operation codenamed Operation Nemesis.

== Purging of evidence ==
According to a leaked diplomatic cable from 2004, ambassador Muharrem Nuri Birgi was effectively in charge of destroying evidence during the 1980s. During the process of eliminating the evidence, ambassador Birgi stated in reference to the Armenians: "We really slaughtered them." Others, such as Tony Greenwood, the Director of the American Research Institute in Turkey, confirmed that a select group of retired military personnel were "going through" the archives. However, it was noted by a certain Turkish scholar that the examination was merely an effort to purge documents found in the archives.

== Controversy ==
Those who deny the Armenian genocide have questioned the translations into Western language (mostly English and German) of the verdicts and accounts published in newspapers. Gilles Veinstein, a professor of Ottoman and Turkish history at Collège de France estimates that the translation made by former Armenian historian Haigazn Kazarian is "highly tendentious, in several locations". Turkish historians Erman Şahin and Ferudun Ata accuse Taner Akçam of mistranslations and inaccurate summaries, including the rewriting of important sentences and the addition of things not included in the original version.

== See also ==
- Mustafa Yamulki
- Outline and timeline of the Greek genocide
- Turkish war crimes

== Bibliography ==
- Akçam, Taner (1996). Armenien und der Völkermord: Die Istanbuler Prozesse und die Türkische Nationalbewegung (in German). Hamburg: Hamburger Edition. p. 185.
- Balakian, Peter (2003). The Burning Tigris: The Armenian Genocide and America's Response. HarperCollins. p. 582. ISBN 978-0-06-019840-4.
- Bonello, Giovanni (2008). Histories of Malta - Confessions and Transgressions, Vol.9. Fondazzjoni Patrimonju Malti. ISBN 978-99932-7-224-3. Archived from the original on 10 July 2018.
- Butler, Daniel Allen (2011). Shadow of the Sultan's Realm: The Destruction of the Ottoman Empire and the Creation of the Modern Middle East. Potomac Books Inc. pp. 211–212. ISBN 978-1597974967.
- Dadrian, Vahakn (1997). "The Turkish Military Tribunal's Prosecution of the Authors of the American Genocide: Four Major Court-Martial Series". Holocaust and Genocide Studies (11). Oxford University Press: 31. ISSN 1476-7937.
- Schabas, William A. (2000). Genocide in International Law: The Crimes of Crimes. Cambridge University Press. ISBN 978-0521787901.
- Ata, Ferudun (2018). The Relocation Trials in Occupied Istanbul. Offenbach am Main: Manzara Verlag. p. 357. ISBN 9783939795926.
- Uluç, Gürkan (2024). Understanding the Armenian Question: Malta Tribunal (1919-1921). Offenbach am Main: Manzara Verlag. p. 304. ISBN 9783911130004.
