= Adile Sultan Palace =

Royal residence of Ottoman princess Adile Sultan

Coordinates: 41°04′19.78″N 29°03′28.69″E

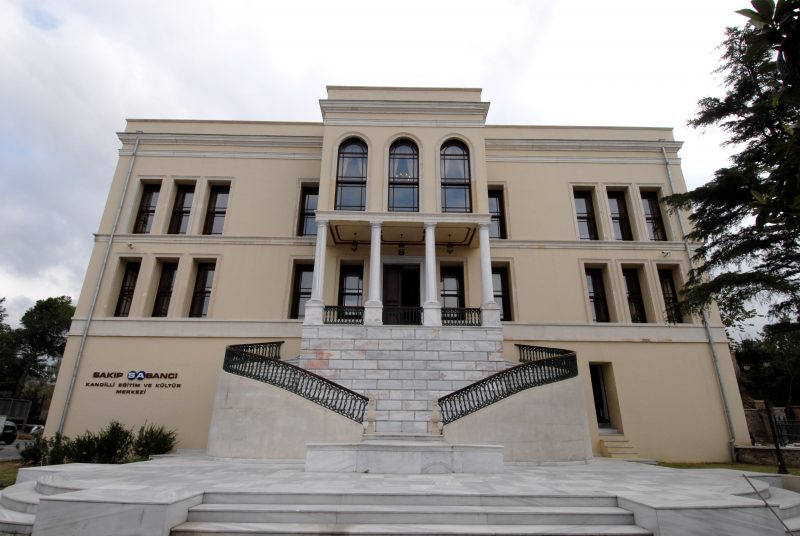
Adile Sultan Palace

Adile Sultan Palace (Turkish: Adile Sultan Sarayı) is the former royal residence of Ottoman princess Adile Sultan. It was donated to the state by Adile Sultan to be used as a school building for the Kandilli Anatolian High School for Girls and is today a cultural center. It is located in the Kandilli neighbourhood of Istanbul, Turkey.

== History ==
The palace was built for the Ottoman princess Adile Sultan (1826–1899), the daughter of Sultan Mahmud II (1789–1839) and the sister of the Sultans Abdülmecid I (1823–1861) and Abdülaziz (1830–1876), and designed by the court architect Sarkis Balyan. It was erected on the same place of a kiosk, which was presented to her by Sultan Abdülmecid in 1856. The palace was commissioned by Sultan Abdülaziz and built by Balyan in 1861. It stands at one of the most prominent places in Istanbul, upon a hill, which is a headland in the middle of Bosphorus on the Asian shore. This location enables a panoramic view of Bosphorus, reaching from the Sea of Marmara to the Black Sea, seen out of all the rooms in three sides of the building. The palace with has 55 rooms and is on a ground of 17,000 m^{2}.

Adile Sultan, a great and the only Turkish royal female poet having a Diwan, lived here until the death of her husband Damat Mehmed Ali Pasha in 1868. She donated her residence to the state to be used as a high school for girls after her death in February 1899. Before it was used as determined, the palace came a short while under the control of Ministry of War during World War I.

Only in 1916 was the building turned into a secondary school for girls, the Adile Sultan İnas Mekteb-i Sultanisi ("Adile Sultan Imperial Girls School"), and the first graduates left the school in 1920. The school was named 1924 after its location, Kandilli Secondary School. In 1931, the school became the Kandilli High School for Girls, a respected educational institution since then. The classes of the high school moved to a new building in 1969. The old palace was used as dormitory for boarding girls of the school until 1986, when it was burned down due to an electrical short-circuit. The historic building became a ruin consisting of only four walls.

Some alumni of Kandilli High School established soon a foundation, and raised funds to rebuild the palace. However, the cost of the restoration exceeded their extent. With the huge financial support of the late billionaire businessman and philanthropist Sakıp Sabancı and the Governor of Istanbul Muammer Güler, the restoration work could continue. The lacking funds to accomplish the long-lasting and painstaking restoration works were donated again by Sakıp Sabancı in his sickbed three days before his death in 2004. Adile Sultan Palace was rebuilt in ten years at a cost of 9.5 million YTL, and it revived after twenty years by reopening with a ceremony, which took place on June 28, 2006.

The building is named "Sakıp Sabancı Kandilli Education and Culture Center". The palace covers an area of 5,625 m^{2}, which accommodates an oval hall for meeting and banqueting of 500 people, another two meeting halls for 200 people each, a 1,300 m^{2} hall for cocktails and exhibitions, 20 seminar rooms with 30-40 seats, a museum, a dining hall for 150 people and a cafeteria for 60 people. The palace garden offers place for 2,000 people.

== See also ==
- Ottoman architecture
