= Jean-François Eugène Robinet =

French psychiatrist and historian

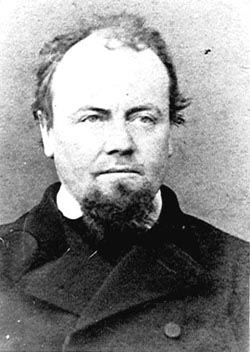
Jean-François Eugène Robinet

Jean-François Eugène Robinet (24 April 1825, in Vic-sur-Seille – 3 November 1899, in Paris), was a French psychiatrist and historian who advocated the positivism of Auguste Comte. He was curator at the Carnavalet Museum and mayor of the 6th arrondissement of Paris.

== Selected works ==
- Notice sur l’œuvre et la vie d’Auguste Comte, (1860) Paris: Dunod
- La Révolution française : Danton. Mémoire sur sa vie privée (1865) Paris: Chamerot et Lauwereyns
- Le procès des Dantonistes (1879) Paris: E. Leroux
- Danton Homme d’État (1889) Paris: Charavay Frères
