= Samipaşazade Sezai =

Turkish writer (1859–1936)

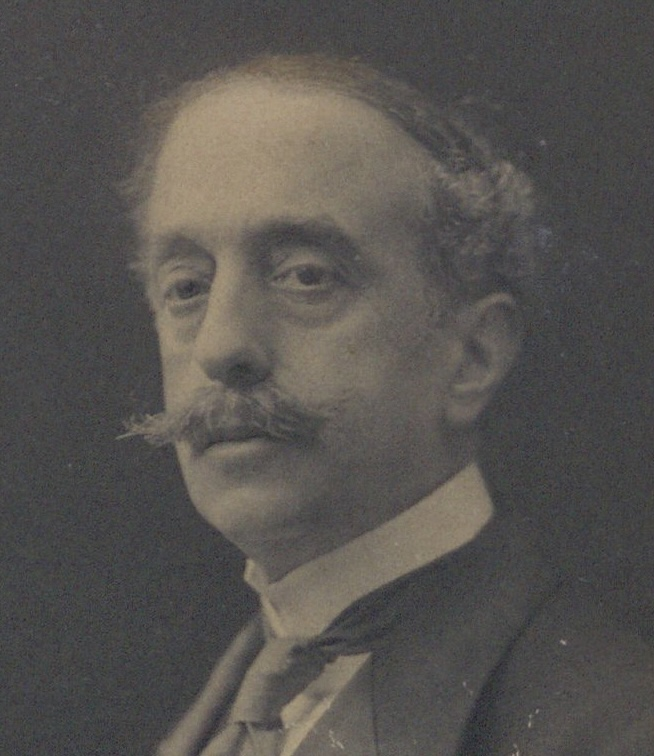

Personal details
- Born: 1859 Constantinople, Ottoman Empire
- Died: 1936 (aged 76–77) Istanbul

Samipaşazade Sezai (1859 – 1936) was an Ottoman and later Turkish educator, politician, diplomat and writer, who was one of the leading lights of the Turkish Romantic period. He also served as the Ottoman ambassador to Spain and later Switzerland during the First World War.
