= Meşveret =

Ottoman Turkish language bimonthly magazine in France (1895–1898)

- Editor: Ahmet Rıza
- Categories: Political magazine
- Frequency: Bimonthly
- Founder: Ahmet Rıza; Albert Fua; Aristidi Efendi; Halil Ganem
- Founded: 1895
- First issue: 1 December 1895
- Final issue: 7 May 1898
- Based in: Paris
- Language: Ottoman Turkish

Meşveret (Ottoman Turkish: lit. 'Consultation', French: Mechvéret) was an Ottoman Turkish-language bimonthly magazine which existed between 1895 and 1898. Published in Paris, the magazine was the first official organ of the Committee of Union and Progress (CUP) and was subtitled as “the media organ of the Ottoman Committee of Union and Progress". Its motto was ordo et progrès (French: Order and progress).

== History and profile ==
The first issue of Meşveret appeared on 1 December 1895. Ahmet Rıza, an exiled leader of the CUP, was the cofounder and editor of the magazine which was published in Paris to support the policies of the Committee. The other founders included Albert Fua, Aristidi Efendi and Halil Ganem. The latter was also a regular contributor. They were part of the Osmanlı İttihat ve Terakki Cemiyeti (Ottoman Turkish: Committee of the Ottoman Union and Progress), one of the precursor groups of the CUP. The magazine functioned as the official media outlet of this group.

Notable contributors of Meşveret included Mizancı Murat Bey, Şerafeddin Mağmumi and Abdullah Cevdet who used the pseudonym “Bir Kürd” ("A Kurd"). Another leading figure who published articles in the magazine was Süleyman Nazif during his exile years in Paris from 1897. Yusuf Akçura also contributed to Meşveret when he was living in Paris.

Meşveret employed the French Republican calendar instead of the Islamic calendar, reflecting its positivist leaning. From 7 December 1895 the magazine published a French supplement entitled Mechvéret supplément français. Meşveret was published on a bimonthly basis. The magazine supported the adoption of a constitution in the Ottoman Empire and the abdication of Sultan Abdul Hamid who in turn demanded the French authorities to take steps to reduce criticisms published in the magazine and also, to ban the periodicals and newspapers published by the Ottoman exiles in Paris. The Ottomans labelled the magazine as "the most dangerous publication of the Young Turks." Upon the Sultan's request, Ahmet Rıza was detained by the French authorities. Meşveret ceased publication in 1898 after producing a total of thirty issues. The final issue was dated 7 May 1898. However, its French supplement continued to be printed.

Ahmet Rıza attempted to restart Meşveret in Geneva, but his efforts were not fruitful due to the Sultan's pressure. The magazine was replaced by another periodical entitled Osmanlı which was based in Geneva.
