= Temporary Law of Deportation =

Relocation and Resettlement Law in the Ottoman Empire

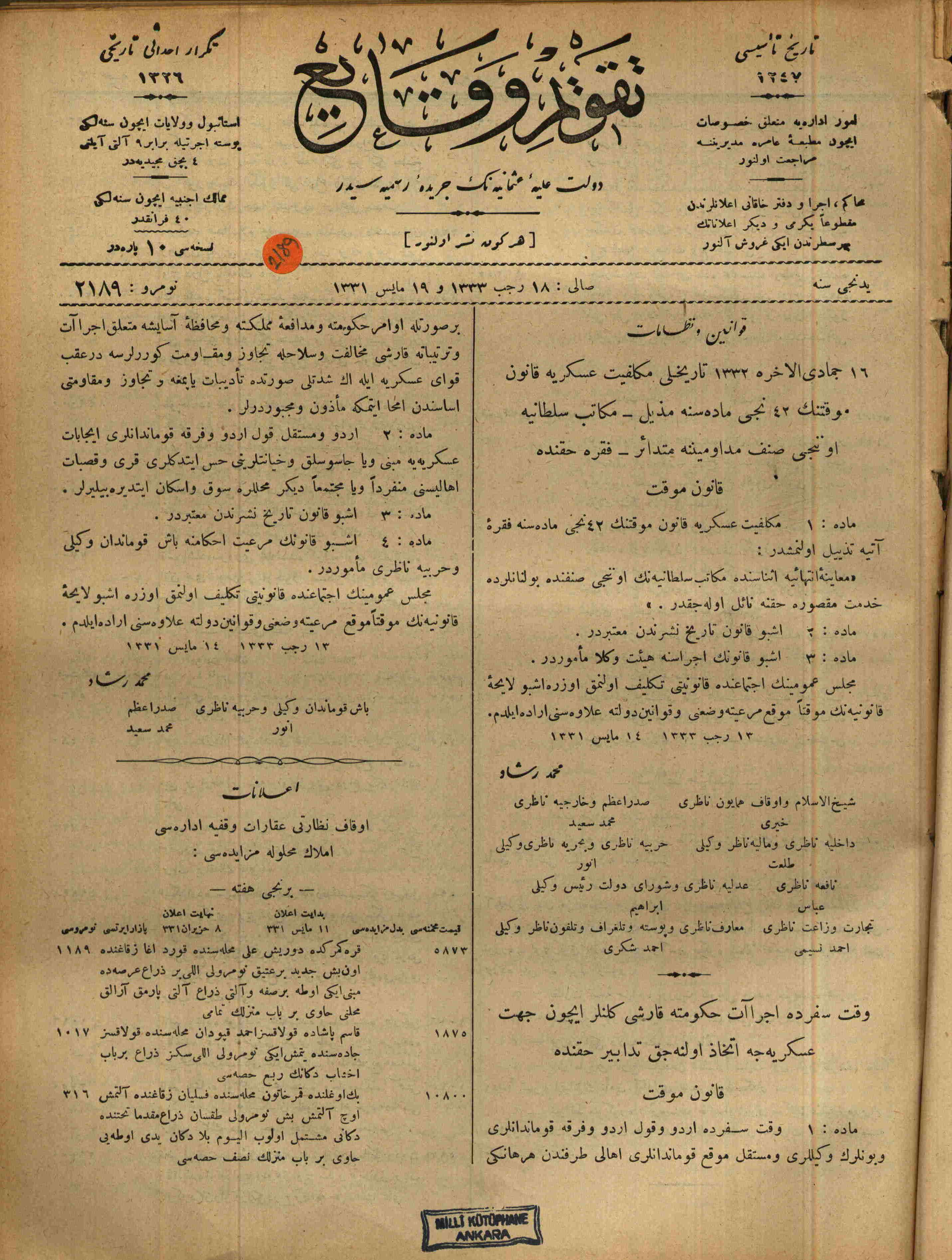
The Tehcir Law as printed in Takvîm-i Vekâyi

The Temporary Law of Deportation, also known as the Tehcir Law (Turkish pronunciation: [tehˈd͡ʒiɾ]; lit. 'deportation' in Ottoman Turkish), or officially, the "Vakt-ı Seferde İcraat-ı Hükûmete Karşı Gelenler İçin Cihet-i Askeriyece İttihaz Olunacak Tedabir Hakkında Kanun-u Muvakkat" (Provisional Law Regarding Measures to Be Taken by the Military Against Those Who Oppose Government Actions During Wartime) was a law passed by the Ottoman Council of Ministers on May 27, 1915 authorizing the deportation of the Ottoman Empire's Armenian population. While the law was allegedly temporary, the Ottomans' main motivation was to settle the Armenian question once for all, therefore permanently.

The resettlement campaign resulted in the deaths of anywhere between 800,000 and over 1,500,000 civilians, in what historians widely characterize as the Armenian genocide. The bill was officially enacted on June 1, 1915, and expired on February 8, 1916. On 18 December 1918, the Ottoman Chamber of Deputies declared the Tehcir Law and the temporary law which authorized selling of confiscated Armenian property rescinded and illegal. The Ankara Government reissued the laws on 14 September 1922.

== Issues ==
The Tehcir Law was part of the euphemistic "special measures" against the Armenian population taken by the Ottoman Empire during World War I. This was coupled with a second set of orders given to the "Special Organization" for the systematic elimination of the evacuated population during the death marches, and the appropriation of their vacated properties.

The Ottoman archives document that the Armenian deportations started as early as March 2, 1915. After the expiration of the Tehcir Law, deportations and massacres continued. On September 13, 1915, the Ottoman parliament passed the "Temporary Law of Expropriation and Confiscation," stating that all property, including land, livestock, and homes belonging to Armenians, was to be confiscated by Ottoman authorities.

== Background ==
Before the Ottoman parliament implemented the "Tehcir Law", there was a circular by Talaat Pasha. (Note: Talaat previously had the title "Bey," and so was known as "Talaat Bey" until he gained the title "Pasha" in 1917.) According to Talaat Pasha, a law passed on 11 February 1915 allowed for parliament to go into an early recess on March 1, but allowed the government to issue temporary laws in their absence. In the night of April 24, 1915, Talaat, who was the minister of interior at the time, ordered 250 Armenian intellectuals to be deported from Constantinople.

In May 1915, Mehmed Talaat Pasha requested that the Ottoman Cabinet and the then Grand Vizier Said Halim Pasha legalize a measure for relocation and settlement of the Armenians to other places. Talaat's words were "the Armenian riots and massacres, which had arisen in a number of places in the country are a threat to national security."

== The nature of the law ==
Tehcir Law was officially a "temporary" law that expired on February 8, 1916. Back It was a civil law, planned, implemented and enforced with an office (created by the law) to coordinate the activities under the name of "Migrant General Directorate" (Ottoman Turkish: Muhacirin Müdüriyet-i Umumîyesi). The civil law gave the military an enforcing power only if there were parties opposing the implementation. The rules and regulations of the law, as published in the Takvim-i Vekayi (Ottoman official newspaper), were public and they were shared with all the political parties.

== Contents ==
Turkish transliteration
Madde 1—Vakti seferede ordu ve kolordu ve fırka kumandanları ve bunların vekilleri ve müstahkem mevki kumandanları ahali tarafından herhangi bir suretle evamiri hükümete ve müdafaai memlekete ve muhafazai asayişe müteallik icraat ve tertibata karşı muhalefet ve silahla tecavüz ve mukavemet görürlerse kuvayı askeriye ile şiddetli surette tedibat yapmaya ve tecavüz ve mukavemeti esasından imha etmeye mezun ve mecburdurlar.
Madde 2—Ordu ve müstakil kolordu ve fırka kumandanları icabatı askeriyeye mebni veya casusluk ve hıyanetlerini hissetikleri kurâ ve kasabat ahalisini münferiden veya müstemian diğer mahallere sevk ve iskan ettirebilirler.
Madde 3—İş bu kanun tarihi neşrinden muteberdir.
English translation
Article 1—During war time, army and corp commanders and their deputies and commanders of fortified posts are obliged to destroy any assault or resistance and violently restore order with military forces in the case of opposition, armed attacks or resistance directed against the government orders, the defense of homeland and the preservation of public order.
Article 2—Army, independent corp and division commanders are allowed to transfer and relocate the village and town population in matters related to the military affair or if they feel there is an activity of espionage and treason.
Article 3—This law is effective from the date of its publication.

One Ottoman Archival material, dated from July 12, 1915, suggests that massacres were part of those measures implemented against the Armenians. The Turkish Martial Court supports this by referring to documents that claim that the main reason for the evacuation was annihilation.

Although this law was directed against one particular ethnic group (the Armenians), the Assyrian population of the Ottoman Empire also fell victim as did some other Christians from the East.

In the text of the law, there is no explicit mention of the Armenian Question, and the text contains that: (1) the ill, (2) the blind, (3) Catholics, (4) Protestants, (5) the soldiers and their families, (6) the officers, (7) merchants, some workers and masters were not subject to evacuation. If conditions got worse, these groups are ordered to be settled in the city centers.

Capitulations of the Ottoman Empire granted missionaries a protectorate state (see:Protectorate of missions). There is a group of rules that grant rights to missionaries under the Ottoman Empire. Another decipher orders the Catholic Armenian missionaries not to leave the Ottoman Empire until the next order. This message was not respected in some centers, such as Maraş and Konya.

=== Fate of the subjects ===
The law included a responsible party for the protection of properties the owners could/will return in a later term. Another law was passed to regulate the enforcement of this section On 10 June 1915. In this section, it was demanded that there would be three copies of this information; one kept in the regional churches, one in the regional administration, and one kept by the commission responsible for the execution of the law. The second and third parties of this law were held responsible for the protection of the properties until the immigrants' return.

While the law was allegedly temporary, the Ottomans' main motivation was to settle the Armenian question once for all, therefore permanently. Kamuran Gurun has released archival material from Enver Pasha, the Minister of War, that provides the aim of passing the law. In that letter Enver takes it as permanent and not temporary with the aim of fixing the Armenian problem once and for all.

While it is claimed that the debts of the evacuated population were to be completely canceled, and recurring tax debts (property tax) of the Armenians were to be postponed until their supposed return, the Armenian properties were seized by the government, sold or given to the Muslim residents or immigrants. A significant amount of money made from the sale of the seized properties was transferred and secured in Berlin.

== Financial aspects ==
A fund was initiated with the law. The control of the fund was assigned to director Şükrü Bey, a directorate under the immigrants general office (Immigrant and Tribe Settling). He was accused of complicity during the courts-martial in the destruction of the Armenian population. Also considered to maintain the link between the Ittihadists and the Special Organization. From the documents:

Budget for the Tehcir June 1, 1915 to February 8, 1916
İzmit province	150,000 kuruş
Eskişehir	200,000 kuruş
Angora Vilayet	300,000 kuruş
Konya Vilayet	400,000 kuruş
Adana Vilayet	300,000 kuruş
Aleppo Vilayet	300,000 kuruş
Mosul Vilayet	500,000 kuruş
Syria Vilayet	100,000 kuruş
Total	2,250,000 kuruş

Also, the Ottoman government under the international agreements assigned within the capitulations, enabled fund transfers using the missionaries and consuls. Armenian immigrants from the United States sent funds, which were distributed to the Armenians under the knowledge of the government by these institutions. The American Near East Relief Committee, a relief organization for refugees in the Middle East, helped donate over $102 million to Armenians both during and after the war.

The funds within the provinces aided the immigrants, whose money allocations were sent under provincial budgets depending on the condition of needs. The Ottomans, however, barred humanitarian aid from reaching the starving Armenian population.

== Repeal of the law ==
The law was repealed on February 21, 1916, with an order sent to all Ottoman provinces, while the destruction of the Armenian population continued. Claimed political detainees continued to be displaced to the Der Zor province. All the activities finalized on March 15, 1916.
