= National Defence League =

National Defence League may refer to:

- National Defence League (Australia)
- National Defense League (Ottoman Empire)
