= National economy (Turkey) =

Economic plan for the Ottoman Empire and the Republic of Turkey

National economy (Turkish: Millî İktisat) was an economic plan which sought to industrialize the Ottoman Empire through corporatism, protectionism, and statist measures. This became a formal platform of Committee of Union and Progress (CUP) policy in their 1916 congress. The CUP aimed to create a Turkish-Muslim capitalist class (bourgeoisie), industrialization via national banks and corporations, independence of the Ottoman economy from Europe, and the elimination of non-Muslims from the economy. Initially members of the CUP advocated for boycotts against goods from non-Muslim merchants. Later assets held by foreign entities and native Christians were confiscated and redistributed to Muslims. The theft of property held by Christians was an integral part of the Armenian genocide and expulsion of Greeks.

These policies aimed to establish an economic class dominated by Turks or Turkified Muslims, whom the CUP and its Kemalist successors regarded as politically loyal. This loyalty was attributed not only to their ethno-religious identity, but also to the fact that their economic position had been made possible by those who removed competing groups. Envisioned by Ziya Gökalp and Alexander Parvus the national economy program was carried out by successive Ottoman and Turkish governments. The prominent Turkish magazine Türk Yurdu announced 1915 as the starting year of the national economy. Import substitution industrialization and property confiscation centralized capital into the hands of "loyal" ethnic groups, which deepened political support among Muslims for the CUP. Previously well established liberal policy gave way to protectionism: tariffs on foreign goods were increased in 1914 from 8 to 11% and by 1915 they reached 30%.

Talaat Pasha, a chief architect of the Armenian genocide, stated that the loss of Ottoman Armenians would damage the economy temporarily, but that Turks would step in their positions and soon replace the Armenians. Turkish historian Uğur Ümit Üngör asserts that "the elimination of the Armenian population left the state an infrastructure of Armenian property, which was used for the progress of Turkish (settler) communities. In other words: the construction of an étatist Turkish "national economy" was unthinkable without the destruction and expropriation of Armenians." The CUP's National Economy (Millî İktisat) program exerted a major and enduring influence on the political economy of the Republic of Turkey; historians have identified substantial continuity from Unionist Millî İktisat through early Republican economic policy and the later doctrine of statism (devletçilik).

== Economic policy of the CUP ==
Before the 1908 revolution, the Committee of Union and Progress held extremist views of the economy, for example advocating for boycotts against Armenian goods and shutting down the Public Debt Administration. Post revolutionary success gave way to a pragmatic economic policy. Other than encouragement of domestic production projects, the CUP largely followed a liberal economic policy to Mehmed Cavid's designs, resulting in a large increase in foreign investment between 1908 and 1913 despite the volatility of the Ottoman Empire's international standing. When it came to strike actions implemented by Ottoman workers after the revolution, the committee sided with the capitalists to suppress labour and the guilds (guilds were abolished in 1913). For the countryside, the CUP did not attempt land redistribution or end the practice of sharecropping, though they did encourage the modernization of agriculture.

However, following the radicalization of the CUP post-Balkan Wars, the committee switched back to extremist rhetoric in the economy, advocating for Muslim Turkish domination of the economy at the expense of non-Muslim and non-domestic business. After signing a secret alliance with Germany, the Ottoman government announced the suspension of its debt payments. With the Great Powers distracted as World War I began, on 1 October, the Ottoman Empire unilaterally abolished the capitulations. Import tariffs were reformed to apply to specific goods in place of the previous ad valorem regime. The July 1914 Law on the Encouragement of Industry was a protectionist measure to prefer Ottoman products even if they were 10% more expensive than an equivalent import. These protectionist measures took inspiration of Alexander Parvus, a Marxist economist close to the Unionists who advocated for the construction of a strong embryonic bourgeoisie. 19th century German industrialization was to be the example of Ottoman industrialists. Another architect of National Economy was Kara Kemal Bey, the CUP Istanbul party-boss and head of the Special Trade Commission [Heyet-i Mahsusa-i Ticariye].

For the CUP, the way to kick start capitalism for the Turks was to seize capital from the well endowed Christians for themselves. To this end, pseudo-Marxist rhetoric was used against Armenian enterprise such as there being a "class struggle" and disproportionate ownership by Armenians of wealth that had to be shared with Muslims at all costs.

To Emil Ludwig, Talaat Pasha mentioned that the loss of the Armenian workforce would damage the economy for a short while, but that Turks would step in their positions and replace the Armenians soon. Contemporary Turkish historian Uğur Ümit Üngör asserts that "the elimination of the Armenian population left the state an infrastructure of Armenian property, which was used for the progress of Turkish (settler) communities. In other words: the construction of an étatist Turkish "national economy" was unthinkable without the destruction and expropriation of Armenians."

The CUP supported many stock companies later in the war, and once again welcomed guilds with the Society of Guilds [Esnaf Cemiyeti]. The Society of Guilds and the National Defence League essentially put the sale and distribution of wheat inside the Empire and to its allies under Unionist secretaries. These trustees became the face of corruption and war profiteering in the Unionist regime, and were known as the 'rich of 1916.' Attempts by the government to crackdown on price gouging were "half-hearted and unsuccessful." Wage-earning farmers were the ultimate victims of the supply regime. Their additional conscription into the army to alleviate manpower shortages in costly fronts meant that by the end of the war, the empire's economy was ruined.

== Legacy ==
The 1921 Tekâlif-i Milliye, similar to the National Economy, confiscated property belonging to deported Ottoman Greeks and Ottoman Armenians, who were deliberately denied compensation, unlike Muslim property owners.

The policies associated with National Economy were essential for the CUP's Türk Yurdu project that carried over to the later Republican People's Party regime, and created a fertile ground for the Republic of Turkey's industrialization post independence war.

Confiscation of Christian-owned property continued until the late twentieth century.

== See also ==
- Confiscation of Armenian properties in Turkey
- Varlık Vergisi
- Economic history of Turkey
- Economic history of the Ottoman Empire
