= Relationship between Enver Pasha and Mustafa Kemal Atatürk =

Political and military relationship between Enver Pasha and Mustafa Kemal Atatürk

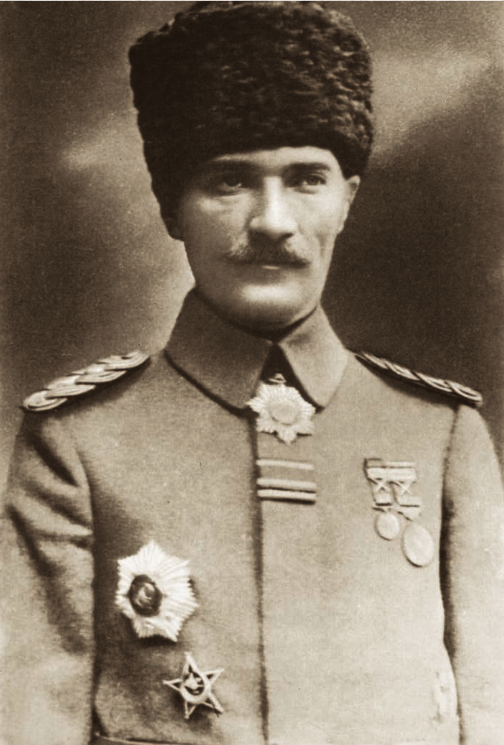
Mustafa Kemal in 1916

Enver Pasha in 1917

The relationship between Enver Pasha and Mustafa Kemal was complex and has been subject to considerable historical debate and political manipulation, particularly in Kemalist historiography, which has exaggerated the mens' rivalry and portrayed Kemal as a longstanding opponent of Enver and the Committee of Union and Progress (CUP).

== 1911–1913 ==
During the Italo-Turkish War (1911–1912), Enver and Kemal served together in Libya, organizing forces against the Italian invasion. Enver held overall command of Ottoman operations in Cyrenaica, while Kemal commanded forces around Derna under his authority. Although they cooperated effectively in military matters, their personal relations deteriorated. By the time they returned to Constantinople, their disagreements had become widely known within Ottoman military circles. Nevertheless, when the First Balkan War broke out in October 1912, it was initially planned that Kemal would succeed Enver in command of the forces in Libya, although most of the Ottoman officers eventually returned home.

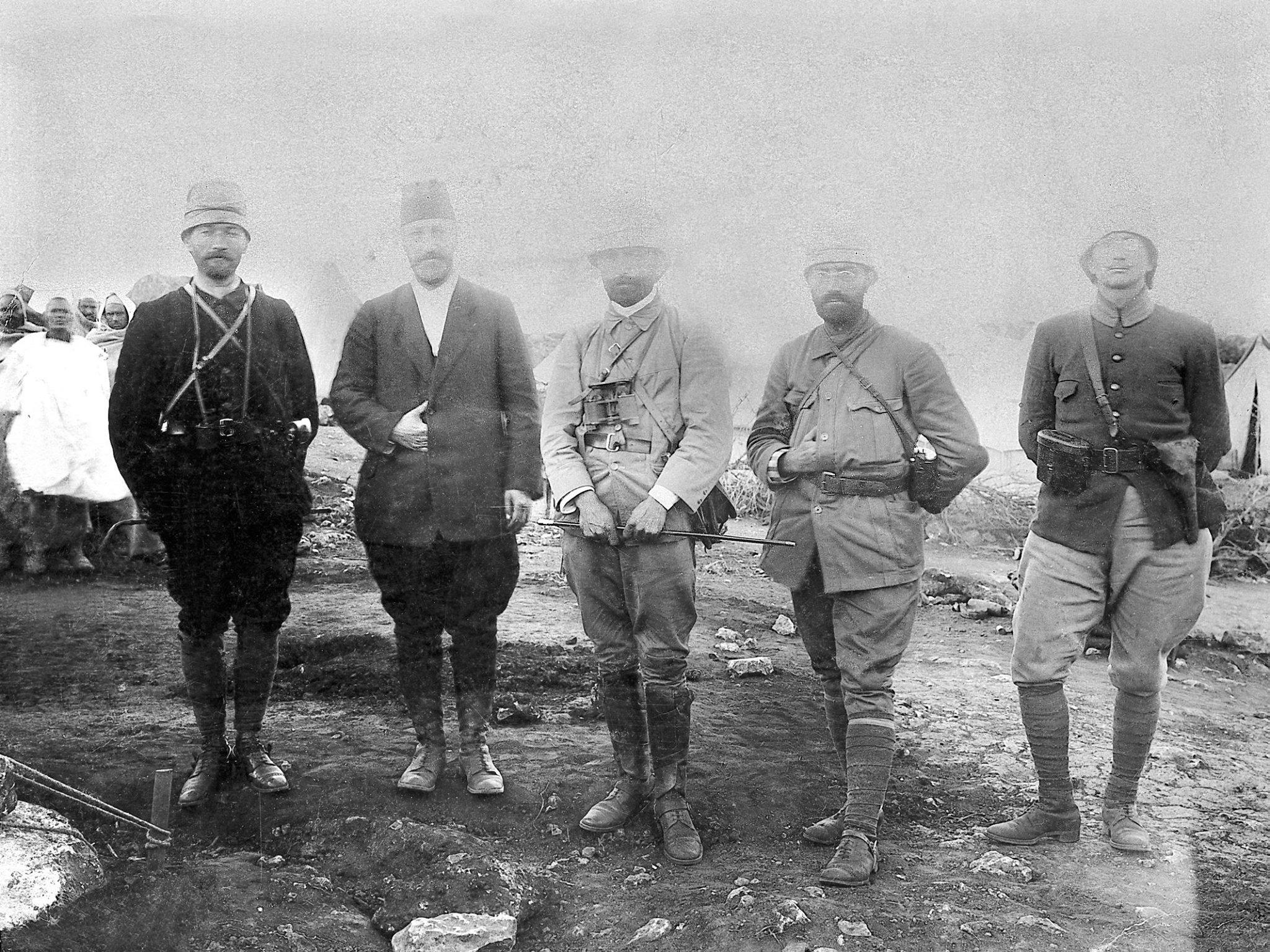
Kemal and Enver with fellow Ottoman officers on the Tripoli front in Libya, 19 December 1911.

Following the 1913 Ottoman coup d'état, which strengthened Enver's position within the Committee of Union and Progress (CUP), relations between Enver and Kemal deteriorated further. The two had clashed over the failed Şarköy–Bolayır operation during the First Balkan War, resulting in bitter disagreements between Enver and the officers associated with Kemal and Kemal's friend, Ali Fethi Okyar. In October 1913, Fethi left the army and was appointed Ottoman ambassador to Bulgaria, while Kemal accompanied him as military attaché in Sofia. In Kemalist historiography, this appointment has been portrayed as a form of "exile", supposedly intended to remove Kemal from the political and military centre in Constantinople because of his rivalry with Enver. However, the appointment was a legitimate military and diplomatic assignment, involving important responsibilities in the Balkans and not a "punitive" measure in any way.

== 1914–1918 ==
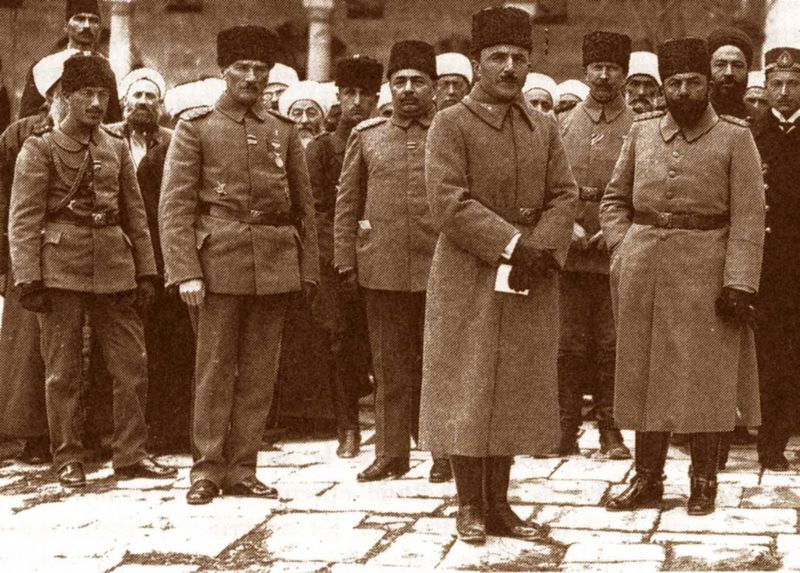
Kemal Pasha, Enver Pasha and Djemal Pasha inspecting the front in Damascus during the First World War.

Following the Ottoman Empire's entry into World War I in November 1914, Kemal requested an active military command from Enver, who had become minister of war and deputy commander-in-chief. Enver granted his request, appointing him commander of the 19th Division in January 1915. Kemal subsequently distinguished himself during the Gallipoli campaign, although his relations with Enver and several German commanders remained strained. According to Zürcher, Kemal's quarrelsome conduct repeatedly brought him into conflict with his superiors, and he had to be dissuaded from resigning. Nevertheless, these disagreements did not prevent his advancement. In 1916, he was promoted to brigadier general and given command of the XVI Corps in eastern Anatolia.

Their disagreements became more apparent as Kemal increasingly criticized the conduct of the war and the influence of German officers over the Ottoman military. In November 1915, while on leave in Constantinople, he approached a cabinet minister to express his objections to German involvement. In 1916, he circulated an encrypted telegram among commanders on the eastern front, criticizing the military leadership and calling for collective action. Vehip Pasha, an associate of Enver, informed the latter of the telegram. Enver responded by giving Kemal a choice between abandoning his political activities and resigning from the army to enter politics, offering him a seat in parliament if he chose the latter. (Note: At the CUP's second congress in Thessaloniki, in September 1909, Kemal advocated separating the army from politics, arguing that officers should choose between military service and political participation in the CUP. Although the proposal initially met strong opposition, it was ultimately approved by the congress. Kemal himself, however, did not observe the principle, continuing to intervene in political matters while serving as an officer. Zürcher describes Enver's response in 1916 as "a clever way of turning the tables on Kemal".) That same year, Kemal's name was mentioned in connection with an unsuccessful coup plot organized by Yakub Cemil, who reportedly intended to replace Enver with Kemal. However, Zürcher notes that there is no evidence that Kemal was involved in the conspiracy.

In 1917, Kemal was appointed commander of the Seventh Army in Palestine, serving under German general Erich von Falkenhayn. His opposition to German influence and to the offensive strategy supported by Enver and Falkenhayn led to further disagreements. On 20 and 24 September 1917, Kemal submitted reports to Enver criticizing the condition of the Ottoman armies, the way the war was going and the proposed operations in Palestine. He demanded greater authority over the Sinai front and opposed the continuation of Falkenhayn's command. Nevertheless, Enver's reply of 29 September was cordial. He acknowledged the difficulties facing the Ottoman Empire and stated that he had long known and appreciated Kemal, whose appointment to such an important command he had personally supported. However, Enver maintained his confidence in Falkenhayn and rejected Kemal's proposed changes to the command structure. Kemal subsequently resigned from the Seventh Army in October 1917 and returned to Constantinople.

Despite their disagreements, Enver subsequently proposed that Kemal accompany Crown Prince Vahdeddin on an official visit to Germany in December 1917, an assignment which Kemal accepted. In that meeting, after German imperial governor Johann von Dallwitz pressed Kemal, the latter produced one of the first denials of the Armenian genocide. He later returned to the Seventh Army in August 1918, now serving under Otto Liman von Sanders, and succeeded him as commander of the remaining Ottoman forces in Syria following the Armistice of Mudros. Zürcher argues that, despite Kemal's repeated criticism of Enver and the military leadership, he continued to receive important appointments and promotions throughout the war. There is no evidence that Enver deliberately sabotaged his military career, although Kemal was unable to influence the government's broader military and political decisions.

== 1919–1922 ==
In April 1919, Enver, along with Talaat Pasha, met Bolshevik revolutionary Karl Radek during the latter's imprisonment in Berlin and discussed continued resistance in Anatolia and cooperation with Soviet Russia. According to Radek himself, Enver and Talaat explained that Kemal had to distance himself publicly from the defeated Young Turk government for political reasons, but that there were "no earnest divergences between them", and that they were organizing assistance for him abroad.

Enver generally maintained correspondence with Kemal, writing to him from Moscow on 26 August 1920 and receiving a reply on 4 October. Their correspondence revealed differences over Enver's pan-Islamist activities and relations with Soviet Russia, yet the letters were not aggressive or insulting. Enver also claimed to have helped facilitate negotiations between Ankara and the Soviets.

On 12 March 1921, however, Kemal signed a cabinet decision prohibiting Enver and his associates from entering Anatolia, out of fear that the latter, with his already existing military prestige, would attract supporters and challenge the former's leadership. Following the Greek victory at Battle of Kütahya–Eskişehir in July 1921, Enver moved toward Batumi, hoping to assume leadership of the nationalist movement if Kemal's position collapsed. However, the stalemate produced by the Battle of the Sakarya strengthened Kemal's position, and Enver, instead, turned his attention toward Central Asia.

According to Halil Menteşe's memoirs, following Enver's death in 1922, Kemal remarked: "Enver rose like the sun and set with the splendour of a sunset. Let us leave what came between to history."

== Assessments ==
Historian Erik-Jan Zürcher disputes the conventional depiction of Kemalist historiography which sees Enver and Kemal as rivals. He argues that their alleged rivalry was greatly exaggerated in this type of historiography, which retrospectively portrayed Kemal as a longstanding opponent of Enver and the Committee of Union and Progress (CUP). Zürcher writes that Kemal "was never a serious rival of Enver" within the CUP. Although Kemal's memoirs suggest that he developed an "Enver complex", Zürcher finds no evidence that Enver reciprocated these feelings or that he deliberately sought to obstruct Kemal's career.

Zürcher traces their differences to their shared service in Libya during the Italo-Turkish War. Enver and Kemal cooperated in organizing resistance to the Italian invasion, even as their personal relations deteriorated. Their disagreements were already well known among Ottoman officers when they returned to Constantinople, but Kemal was nevertheless considered as a successor to Enver's command in Libya following the outbreak of the First Balkan War. The dispute between their respective circles sharpened during the Şarköy–Bolayır operation of 1913. Zürcher also rejects the later characterization of Kemal's October 1913 posting to Sofia as military attaché as a punitive "exile" imposed by Enver. The position carried genuine military and diplomatic responsibilities, and Zürcher finds no evidence that Enver was trying to sabotage Kemal's advancement.

In his discussion of the First World War, Zürcher points out that Enver, as minister of war, granted Kemal's request for a field command by appointing him to the 19th Division in January 1915. Kemal subsequently distinguished himself at Gallipoli, but frequently clashed with his superiors and had to be dissuaded from resigning. Zürcher describes Kemal's conduct as quarrelsome. Despite this, Kemal was promoted to brigadier general and received command of the XVI Corps in 1916, further showing that Enver did not consider himself a "rival" of Kemal.

For the disputes of 1917, Zürcher describes Kemal's objections to Erich von Falkenhayn's command and to the Ottoman strategy in Palestine. Kemal sent Enver critical reports on 20 and 24 September; Enver's reply of 29 September was cordial and expressed longstanding appreciation for Kemal, whose appointment he said he had personally supported, although he rejected Kemal's demand to change the command arrangements. Kemal resigned from the Seventh Army in October 1917, but returned to its command in 1918. Zürcher concludes that Kemal's disagreements with Enver and the military leadership did not prevent his repeated appointments and promotions. While Kemal had little success in changing the government's wider military and political decisions, there is no evidence that Enver deliberately sabotaged his career.

Historian Taner Akçam likewise identifies their disagreements mainly with military strategy, Pan-Turanism and Pan-Islamism.

=== Armenian genocide ===
Despite the disagreements between Kemal and Enver, both of them "found common ground in their efforts against the Armenians". Historian Torben Jørgensen notes that Kemal, like Enver, participated in attacks against Armenians, while Enver had also named Kemal as his preferred successor on several occasions.

In September 1920, a decision was signed by Kemal to deport Armenian and Greek men aged between 20 and 40 to the interior of Anatolia. Historian Ruben Safrastyan argues that Kemal adopted the Enver's practices during the Armenian genocide. At the same month, Enver urged Kemal to launch an offensive against the First Republic of Armenia before its military position could strengthen. Despite their differences, Enver emphasized the need to put aside "internal differences" in pursuit of their national objectives. Kemal, in turn, acknowledged Enver, thanked him for his patriotic efforts, and discussed the importance of Soviet assistance to the nationalist movement.
