= Committee of Union and Progress =

1889–1918 Turkish political party

Union and Progress Party اتحاد و ترقى فرقه‌سی İttihad ve Terakki Fırkası
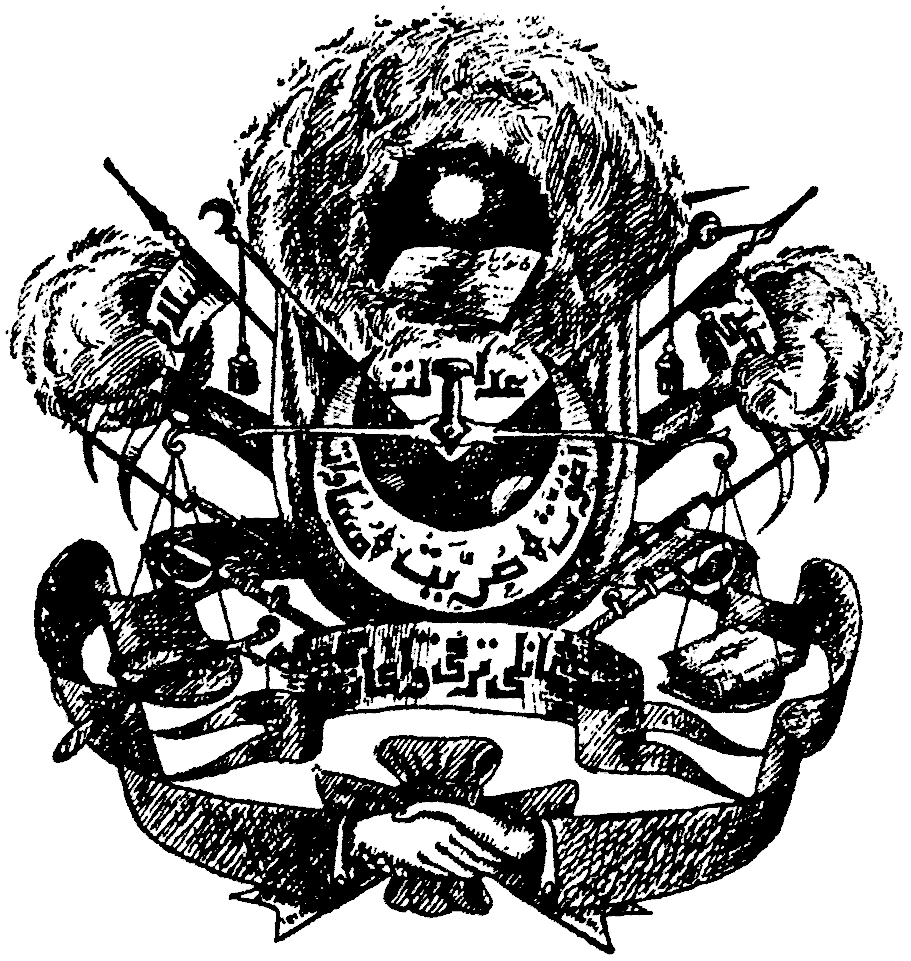
- Leader: Talaat Pasha (1908–1918); Ahmet Rıza (1897–1908)
- Secretary-General: Nazım Bey (1908–1917); Midhat Şükrü Bleda (1917–1918)
- Founders: Ibrahim Temo; İshak Sükuti; Abdullah Cevdet; Mehmed Reşid
- Founded: 21 May 1889 (137 years, 183 days) (as a committee) 24 September 1909 (117 years, 57 days) (as a party)
- Dissolved: 5 November 1918 (108 years, 15 days)
- Succeeded by: CHP (de facto), HAF, TF, A-RMHC
- Headquarters: Pembe Konak, Constantinople
- Newspaper: Meşveret; Şûrâ-yı Ümmet (magazine); Tanin... and others: Türk; Genç Kalemler; Kanun-i Esasi; Mizan; İslam Mecmuası
- Armed wing: Special Organization
- Membership: ▲850,000 (1909 est.)
- Ideology: İttihadism: Constitutionalism; Centralization; Progressivism; Turkish nationalism; Positivism; Social Darwinism; Pan-Turkism (from 1909); Ottomanism (until 1913); Pan-Islamism (from 1914); Statism (from 1915); Anti-Armenianism (from 1915)
- Front group: National Defense League
- Colours: Red White
- Slogan: Hürriyet, Müsavat, Adalet ('Liberty, Equality, Justice')
- Chamber of Deputies (1914): 192 / 275

Party flag

The Ottoman Committee of Union and Progress (CUP, also translated as the Society of Union and Progress; Ottoman Turkish: اتحاد و ترقى جمعيتی, romanized: İttihad ve Terakki Cemiyeti, French: Union et Progrès) was a revolutionary group, secret society, and political party, active between 1889 and 1918 in the Ottoman Empire. The CUP and its members have often been referred to as "Young Turks", although the Young Turk movement produced other political parties as well. Within Turkey its members were known as İttihadcılar ('Unionists') or Komiteciler ('Committeemen').

The organisation began as a liberal reform movement, and the autocratic government of Sultan Abdul Hamid II (r. 1876–1909) persecuted it because of its calls for constitutional government. Most of its members were exiled and arrested after a failed coup-attempt in 1896. The resultant period of infighting among Young Turk émigrés saw Ahmet Rıza Bey emerge as the organization's leader. The CUP's cause revived by 1905 with a new cadre of bureaucrats and army contingents based in Ottoman Macedonia which were fighting ethnic insurgents in the Macedonian Struggle. In 1908 the Unionists revolted in the Young Turk Revolution, and forced Abdul Hamid to re-instate the Constitution, ushering in an era of political plurality. During the Second Constitutional Era, the CUP at first influenced politics from behind the scenes, introducing major reforms to continue the modernisation of the Ottoman Empire. The CUP's main rival was the Freedom and Accord Party which called for a decentralised state, in opposition to the CUP's desire for a centralised Turkish-dominated state.

The CUP consolidated its power at the expense of the Freedom and Accord Party in the 1912 "Election of Clubs" and in the 1913 Raid on the Sublime Porte, while also growing increasingly splintered, radical and nationalistic due to Turkey's defeat in the First Balkan War and attacks on Balkan Muslims. The CUP seized full power following Grand Vizier Mahmud Şevket Pasha's assassination in June 1913, with major decisions ultimately being decided by the party's Central Committee. A triumvirate of the CUP leader Talât Pasha with Enver Pasha and Cemal Pasha took control of the country, and sided with Germany in World War I.

After an ideological transformation, from 1913 to 1918, the CUP ruled the empire as a dictatorship. With the help of their paramilitary, the Special Organization, the Unionist régime enacted policies resulting in the genocide of the empire's indigenous Armenian, Pontic Greek, and Assyrian citizens in order to Turkify Anatolia.

Following Ottoman defeat in World War I in October 1918, CUP leaders escaped into exile in Europe, where the Armenian Revolutionary Federation assassinated several of them (including Talât and Cemal) in Operation Nemesis in revenge for their genocidal policies. Many CUP members were court-martialed and imprisoned in war-crimes trials with support from the Allied powers. However, most former Unionists were able to join the burgeoning Turkish nationalist movement led by Mustafa Kemal Atatürk, ultimately continuing their political careers in the Republic of Turkey as members of Atatürk's Republican People's Party following the Turkish War of Independence. Atatürk and the Republican People's Party expanded on reforms introduced by Union and Progress and continued one-party rule in Turkey until 1946.

== Name ==
The CUP was first established as the Committee of the Ottoman Union (Ottoman Turkish: İttihad-ı Osmanî Cemiyeti) in Constantinople (now Istanbul) on 6 February 1889 by a group of medical students of the Imperial Military School of Medicine. Ahmet Rıza, being an avid follower of Auguste Comte and his theories on progressivism, changed the name of the early club to the Committee of Union and Progress (CUP) (Ottoman Turkish: اتحاد و ترقى جمعيتی, romanized: İttihad ve Terakki Cemiyeti). Between 1906 and 1908 it was known as the Committee of Progress and Union, but changed its name back to the more recognisable Committee of Union and Progress during the Young Turk Revolution.

The word cemiyet has many translations. It is a loanword from the Arabic ( جمعية, jām‘ia) and a classical translation would be "committee" or "society" or "organisation". As the Young Turks greatly admired the French Revolution and the radical political clubs and societies that were founded over its course, a more accurate and faithful translation of İttihad ve Terakki Cemiyeti into English would be "The Society of Union and Progress". They especially wished to model their movement of the Jacobin Club and thought of themselves as such.

In the West, the CUP was conflated with the wider Young Turks movement and its members were called Young Turks, while in the Ottoman Empire a member was known as a İttihadçı or Komiteci, which means İttihadist (Unionist) and Committeeman respectively. Its ideology is known as İttihadçılık, or İttihadism (Unionism). The Central Committee informally referred to itself as the "Sacred Committee" (Cemiyet-i mukaddese) or the "Kaaba of Liberty" (Kâbe-i hürriyet).

== Origins ==
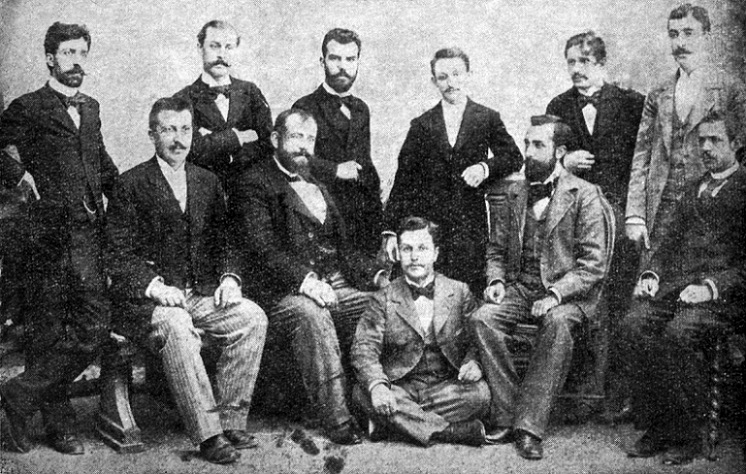
Members of the Young Turks standing (from left to right): İshak Sükuti, Serâceddin Bey, Tunalı Hilmi, Âkil Muhtar, Mithat Şükrü, Emin Bey; sitting: Lutfi Bey, Doctor Şefik, Nûri Ahmed, Doctor Reshid and Celal Münif

The Committee of Ottoman Union (İttihad-ı Osmanî Cemiyeti) was established as a secret student society on 2 June 1889 by Ibrahim Temo, Dr. Mehmed Reşid, Abdullah Cevdet, and İshak Sükuti, all of whom were medical students of the Imperial Military School of Medicine in Constantinople. While they held many contradicting Enlightenment derived beliefs, they were united by the necessity of a constitution to prevent further decline of the empire. Under pressure from the earlier Young Ottomans, Sultan Abdul Hamid II promulgated a constitution and a parliament upon his ascension to the throne in 1876, but suspended both after defeat in the 1877-1878 Russo Turkish War. From 1878 to 1908, Abdul Hamid ruled the empire as a personal dictatorship after purging the Young Ottomans. Critically though, the empire was still in decline. It was in massive debt to European creditors to the point where its finances were controlled by Western bankers, and nationalist movements by non-Muslim minorities continued making inroads. Therefore, a new generation of opposition, called the Young Turks, hoped to overthrow Abdul Hamid II for one of his brothers in order to save the empire through constitutionalism: either the crown prince Mehmed Reşad (Mehmed V) or former Sultan Murad V.

Under the guise of a banquet, the Committee of Ottoman Union held its first meeting in Midhat Pasha's vineyard outside Edirnekapı, Constantinople. It was decided at this meeting that the society would be modeled from the Italian Carbonari and be structured into cells. They met every Friday in different places, where they held seminaries discussing the works of Young Ottoman thinkers such as Namık Kemal and Ziya Pasha, drafted regulations, and read banned philosophy and literature. The society gained support from civilian and military students from other colleges around Constantinople, whereupon members of the society were under surveillance and some would be arrested and interrogated.

Ottoman Union became the preeminent faction of the Young Turks once it absorbed other opposition groups and established contact with exiled intelligentsia, Freemasons, and cabinet ministers, to the point where European observers started calling them the "Young Turk Party". During this time, the organisation was taken over by high-ranking officers and ulema. They supported Kâmil Pasha's coup attempt during height of the diplomatic crisis caused by the Hamidian massacres. With Kâmil's defeat, a wave of arrests and exiles caused chaos for the organisation inside the Ottoman Empire. In August 1896, Unionist ministers plotted a coup d'état to overthrow the sultan, but the plot was leaked to the palace. Prominent statesmen were exiled to Fezzan, Tripolitania, Acre and Benghazi. Another plot was hatched the year after where Unionist cadets of the Military Academy planned to assassinate the Minister of Military Schools. Authorities were tipped off, and a major arrest operation was carried out. 630 people were arrested; 78 of them were sent to Tripolitania. This exile incident went down in history as the "Sacrifices of the Şeref" (Şeref Kurbanları) and was the biggest exile event in Abdul Hamid's reign.

== Émigré politics ==
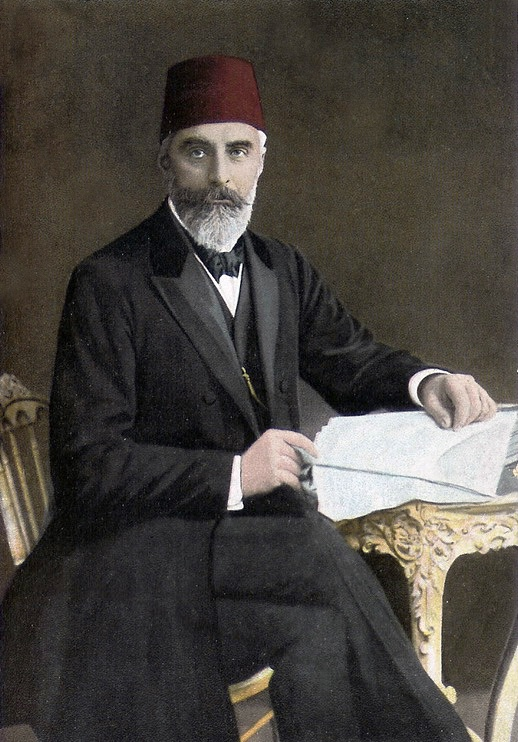
Ahmed Rıza, prominent early member of the CUP

In 1894, Ahmed Rıza Bey was recruited by Ottoman Union to lead its Paris chapter of a united organisation of dissidents operating in Europe and those in Constantinople: the Ottoman Committee of Union and Progress (Osmanlı İttihat ve Terakki Cemiyeti) (CUP), which was centered around the organ Meşveret and its French supplemental. Following the failure of the CUP's plots in the mid-1890s, the organisation's Constantinople section turned inoperable and the headquarters moved to Paris, which had a sizable colony of Young Turk intellectuals. Other Young Turk émigré communities were established in Paris, London, Geneva, Bucharest, and Cairo.

In exile though the Young Turks would be racked by infighting. Rıza was an avowed positivist, and advocated for a Turkish nationalist and secularist agenda. Even though he denounced revolution, he had a more conservative and Islamist rival in Mehmed Murad Bey of Mizan fame. Rıza also had to deal with the "Activist" faction of the CUP that did push for a revolution. Other CUP branches often acted autonomously with their own ideological currents, to the point where the committee resembled more of an umbrella organisation. Meşveret (Rıza) called for the reinstatement of the constitution but without revolution, as well as a more centralised Turkish-dominated Ottoman Empire sovereign of European influence.

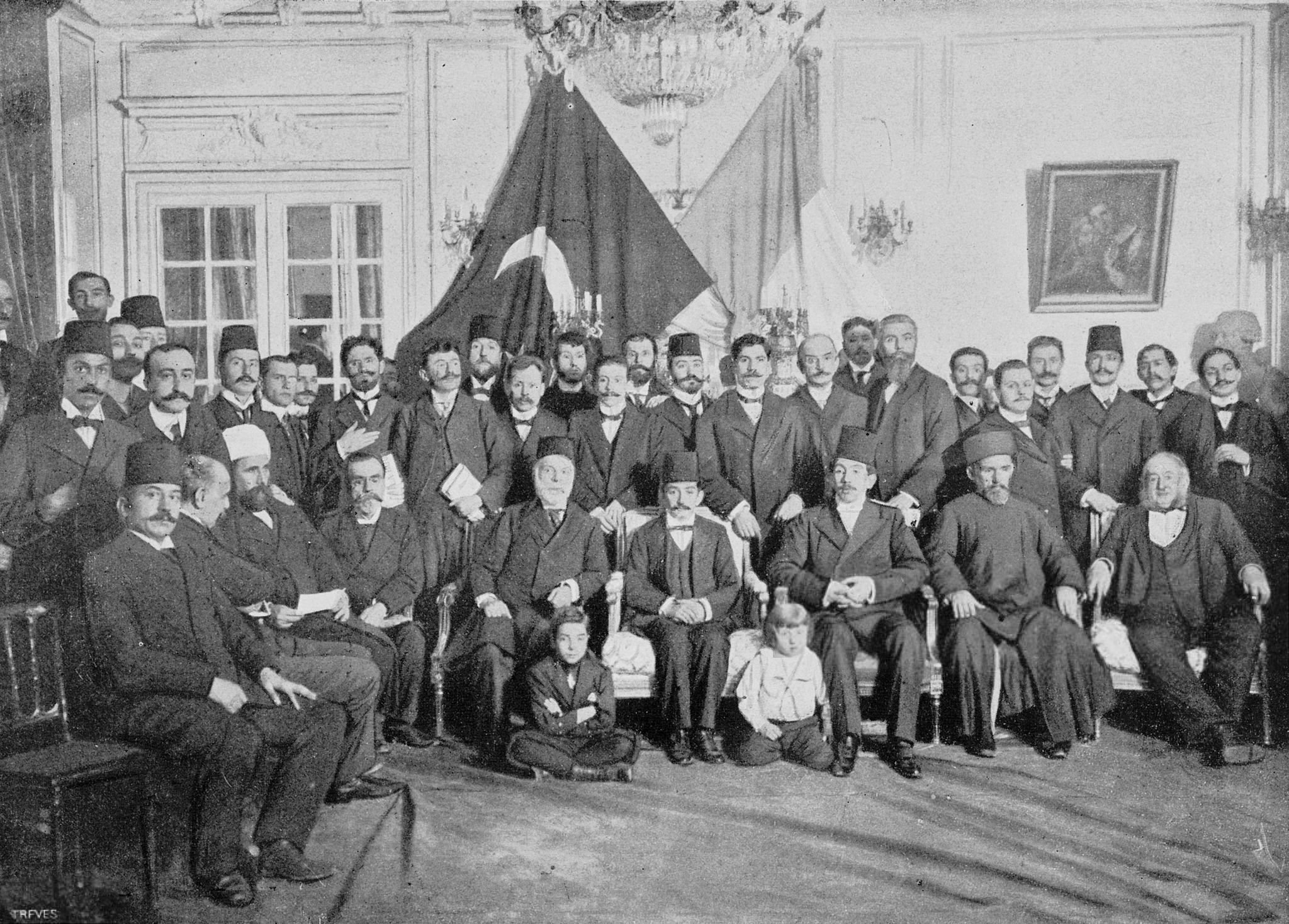
The 1st Young Turk Congress held in Paris in 1902. All the CUP executives are present in the photograph

Under pressure from the palace, French authorities banned Meşveret and deported Rıza and his Unionists in 1896. After settling in Brussels, the Belgian government was also pressured to deport the group a couple years later. A congress in December 1896 saw Murad elected as chairman over Rıza and the headquarters moved to Geneva, causing a schism in the society between Rıza's supporters in Paris and Murad's supporters in Geneva. After the Ottoman Empire's triumph over Greece in 1897 Sultan Abdul Hamid used the prestige he gained from the victory to coax some Young Turks back into his fold. After expelling Rıza from the CUP, Murad accepted the amnesty offer. A wave of extraditions, more amnesties, and buy-outs, weakened an opposition organisation already operating in exile. Though moral was low, Ahmet Rıza, who returned to Paris, was the sole leader of the exiled Young Turks network.

In 1899, members of the Ottoman dynasty Damat Mahmud Pasha and his sons Sabahaddin and Lütfullah fled to Europe to join the Young Turks. However Prince Sabahaddin would form his own outfit, believing that embracing capitalism and liberalism would alleviate the Empire's problems such as separatism from non-Muslim minorities such as the Armenians. In 1902, Prince Sabahaddin and Ismail Qemali organised the First Congress of Ottoman Opposition, held in Paris and attended by Rıza's Meşveret circle, Sabahaddin's supporters, Armenian Dashnaks and Vergazmiya Hunchaks, and other Greek and Bulgarian groups. It was defined by the question of whether or not foreign intervention should be advocated for to achieve regime change in Constantinople; a majority which included Sabahaddin's faction as well as the Armenians advocated for foreign intervention, a minority which included Rıza's Unionists and the Activist Unionists were against foreign intervention. The congress also revealed a broader divide over the empire’s future: many Young Turks favored centralized rule, while non-Turkish nationalities such as Albanians and Armenians supported decentralization as a way to protect their national rights. With this disparate majority, Prince Sabahaddin, Qemali, and Rexhep Pasha Mati plotted a coup d'état, which failed. They later founded the Private Enterprise and Decentralization League, which called for a more decentralised and federalised Ottoman state in opposition to Rıza's centralist vision. The minority turned out to be more ideologically cohesive, so Rıza formed a coalition with the Activists and founded the Committee of Progress and Union (CPU, Osmanlı Terakki ve İttihat Cemiyeti), and now endorsed a "legitimate" revolution. This unsuccessful attempt to bridge the divide amongst the Young Turks instead deepened a rivalry between Sabahaddin's group and Rıza's CPU. The 20th century began with Abdul Hamid II's rule secure and his opposition scattered and divided.

== Revolutionary Era (1905–1908) ==
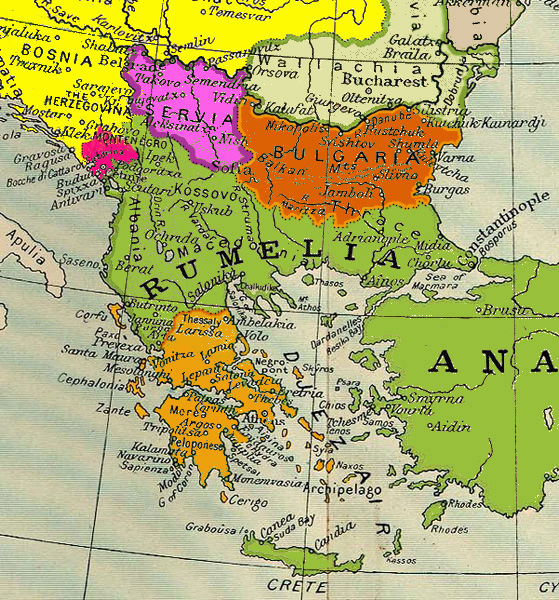
Map of Ottoman Europe (Rumelia) in 1908. The region, then experiencing a low-intensity civil war known as the Macedonian Struggle, was the birthplace of the CUP and its constitutionalist revolution.

Despite all these setbacks for the CUP and Young Turks, the cause for liberty was effectively revived by a new cadre in Salonica (modern Thessaloniki) by 1907. In September 1906, a secret constitutionalist organisation called the Ottoman Freedom Committee (Osmanlı Hürriyet Cemiyeti; OFC) was formed. It had ten founders, among whom was Mehmet Talât, the regional director of Salonica Post and Telegraph services. Most of the OFC founders also joined the Salonica Freemason lodge Macedonia Risorta, as Freemason lodges proved to be safe havens from the secret police of Yıldız Palace.

Army officers İsmail Enver and Kâzım Karabekir would found the Monastir (modern Bitola) branch of the OFC, which turned out to be a potent source of recruits for the organisation. Unlike the mostly bureaucrat recruits of the Salonica OFC branch, OFC recruits from Monastir were officers of the Third Army. The Third Army was engaging Greek, Bulgarian, and Serbian insurgent groups (which were also engaging each other) in what was known as the Macedonian Struggle, and its officers believed a constitution and drastic reform would bring peace and maintain Ottoman authority in a region that was in seemingly perpetual intercommunal conflict. These officers feared that foreign influence would increase in the region if the conflict was left unsolved. Following the catastrophic Ilinden uprising of Bulgarians, the Great Powers already imposed a reform package in 1903 that allowed international inspectors and gendarme to assist with governance in the region. This made joining imperially biased revolutionary secret societies especially appealing to the officers, who believed Sultan Abdul Hamid was not combative enough against the Great Powers. This widespread sentiment led senior officers to turn a blind eye to the fact that many of their junior officers had joined secret societies. Initially the membership of the OFC was only accessible for Muslims, though after 1907, non-Muslims were able to become members of the OFC.

Under Talât's initiative, the OFC merged with Rıza's Paris-section CPU in September 1907, and the group became the internal center of the CPU in the Ottoman Empire. In late 1905 the CPU was significantly reorganized into a revolutionary organization from a intellectual circle by Dr. Bahattin Şakir. Searching for a potent internal circle that could overthrow the government, he identified the OFC in Salonica and demanded they merge. Under the merger agreement, Talât became secretary general of the internal CPU, while Şakir became secretary general of its external department. After the Young Turk Revolution in 1908, this "Macedonian" cadre, consisting of Talât, Enver, Ahmed Cemal, and Mehmed Cavid, as well as Dr. Nâzım and Dr. Şakir, supplanted Ahmed Rıza and the Old Unionists.

Intending to emulate other revolutionary nationalist organisations like the Dashnak Committee or the Internal Macedonian Revolutionary Organization (IMRO), an extensive cell based organisation was constructed. Joining the revolutionary committee was by invitation only, and those who did join had to keep their membership secret. Recruits would undergo an initiation ceremony, where they swore a sacred oath with the sacred book of their religion in the right hand and a sword, dagger, or revolver in the left hand. They swore to unconditionally obey all orders from the Central Committee; to never reveal the CPU's secrets and to keep their own membership secret; to be willing to die for the fatherland and Islam at all times; and to follow orders from the Central Committee to kill anyone whom the Central Committee wanted to see killed, including one's own friends and family. The penalty for disobeying orders from the Central Committee or attempting to leave the CPU was death. To enforce its policy, the Unionists had a select group of especially devoted party members known as fedâi, or self-sacrificing volunteers, whose job was to assassinate any CPU members who disobeyed orders, disclosed its secrets, or were suspected of being police informers. The CPU professed to be fighting for the restoration of the Constitution, but its internal organisation and methods were intensely authoritarian, with its cadres expected to strictly follow orders from the "Sacred Committee".

The committee had a secret presence in towns throughout European Turkey (Rumelia). By comparison, the organisation was noticeably absent from intellectual circles and army units based in Anatolia and the Levant, Smyrna (İzmir) being an exception. Under this umbrella name, one could find ethnic Albanians, Arabs, Armenians, Aromanians, Bulgarians, Serbians, Jews, Greeks, Turks, and Kurds, united by the common goal of overthrowing Abdul Hamid II's despotic regime. During this time, the CPU cultivated close relations with the Dashnaks and IMRO's left wing (Yane Sandanski), and cordial relations with the Hunchaks.

On 22 December 1907, in the Second Congress of Ottoman Opposition, Rıza, Sabahaddin, and the Dashnaks were finally able to put their differences aside and signed an alliance, declaring that Abdul Hamid had to be deposed and the regime replaced with a representative and constitutional government by any means necessary, without foreign interference. The Dashnak Party (Dashnaktsutyun, or Armenian Revolutionary Federation, ARF) is an Armenian nationalist and Marxist–socialist political party with Narodnik influences, which was demanding autonomy and reform for Ottoman Armenia; their Hunchak (Social Democrat Hunchakian Party, SDHP) brothers were positioned more towards their left, and more willing to call for separatism. Both parties took inspiration from committee organisations from the Balkans, leading to the creation of well organised fedayi cells to defend Armenian peasantry and carry on an insurgency in Eastern Anatolia, as well as a willingness to commit acts of terrorism to highlight the Armenian plight and provoke a Great Power intervention (see Ottoman Bank Takeover and Abdul Hamid II assassination attempt in Yıldız). The Dashnaks signed the alliance with the hope that decentralising reforms could be conceded to Ottoman Armenians once the Young Turks took power, even though the CPU's core mantra was centralisation. Their ambiguous relationship can be traced back the year before, when they cooperated in establishing cells in Trabzon and Erzurum. Although Ahmet Rıza eventually pulled out of the tripartite agreement and this alliance played no critical role in the upcoming revolution, the CPU and the Dashnaks maintained a contentious alliance throughout the Second Constitutional Era up until 1914.

== Young Turk Revolution ==
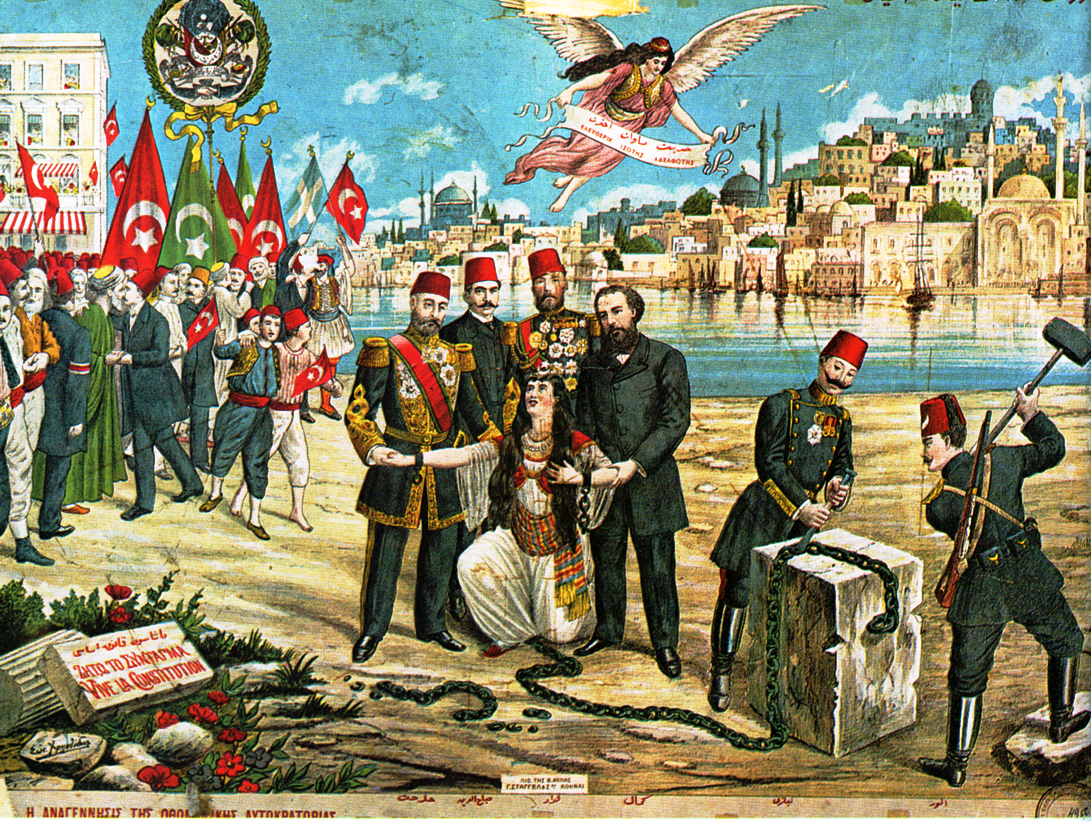
Greek lithograph celebrating the Young Turk Revolution. Enver and Niyazi are depicted breaking the chains of Lady Liberty, who is helped up by the Young Ottomans as a multi-ethnic crowd dressed in traditional costumes embraces each other under Ottoman flags and the CUP's seal. An angel descends from the sky with a scroll that reads liberté, égalité, fraternité. A stone reads Vive La Constitution.

Sultan Abdul Hamid II persecuted the Young Turks in an attempt to hold on to absolute power, but was forced to reinstate the Ottoman constitution, which he had originally suspended in 1878, after threats to overthrow him by the organisation now known as the CUP in the 1908 Young Turk Revolution. The revolution was spontaneous, and was sparked by a summit in July 1908 in Reval, Russia (modern Tallinn, Estonia) between Britain's King Edward VII and Emperor Nicholas II of Russia. Popular rumour within the Ottoman Empire had it that during the summit a secret protocol was signed to partition the Ottoman Empire. Though this story was not true, the rumour led the CUP's Monastir branch –which had recruited many army officers– to act. Enver and Ahmed Niyazi fled to the Albanian hinterlands to organise militias of National Battalions in support of a constitutionalist revolution. The Unionists then carried out a series of assassinations and sent threats to senior officers. The mutiny which originated in the Third Army in Salonica took hold of the Second Army based in Adrianople (modern Edirne) as well as Anatolian troops sent from İzmir. Under pressure of being deposed, on 24 July 1908 Abdul Hamid capitulated and announced the Constitution to be reinstated. Multi-ethnic parades and celebrations were held throughout the empire.

With the reestablishment of the constitution and parliament, a general election was called for December of that year, prompting most Young Turk organisations to turn into political parties, including the CUP. After meeting the goal of reinstating the constitution, in the absence of this uniting factor, the Young Turks began to establish proper parties out of their émigré factions. Prince Sabahaddin founded the Liberty Party and later in 1911 the Freedom and Accord Party. Most of the Old Unionists soon distanced themselves from a CUP which was a very different organisation than what it was originally founded as. Ibrahim Temo and Abdullah Cevdet, two original founders of the CUP, established the Ottoman Democratic Party in February 1909. Ahmet Rıza returned to the capital from Paris, where he was welcomed as the "Father of Liberty" (hürriyetçilerin babası) and unanimously elected president of the Chamber of Deputies, the parliament's lower house, but in 1910 renounced his membership from the CUP.

Despite the period of post-revolutionary euphoria felt throughout the empire, what constitutionalism and reform meant for each group meant different things, and pessimism would soon set in with unfulfilled expectations. Many non-Turkish CUP members would also renounce their membership, as ethnic nationalist organisations which were once allies would cut ties. Much to the committee's dismay, the instability during the revolution resulted in more territorial loses for the Empire, which would not be reversed due to the European powers refusing to uphold the status quo set by the Treaty of Berlin. Austria-Hungary annexed Bosnia, Crete announced a union with Greece, and Bulgaria declared independence. As a result, the CUP organised a boycott against Austro-Hungarian made goods.

== Second Constitutional Era (1908–1913) ==
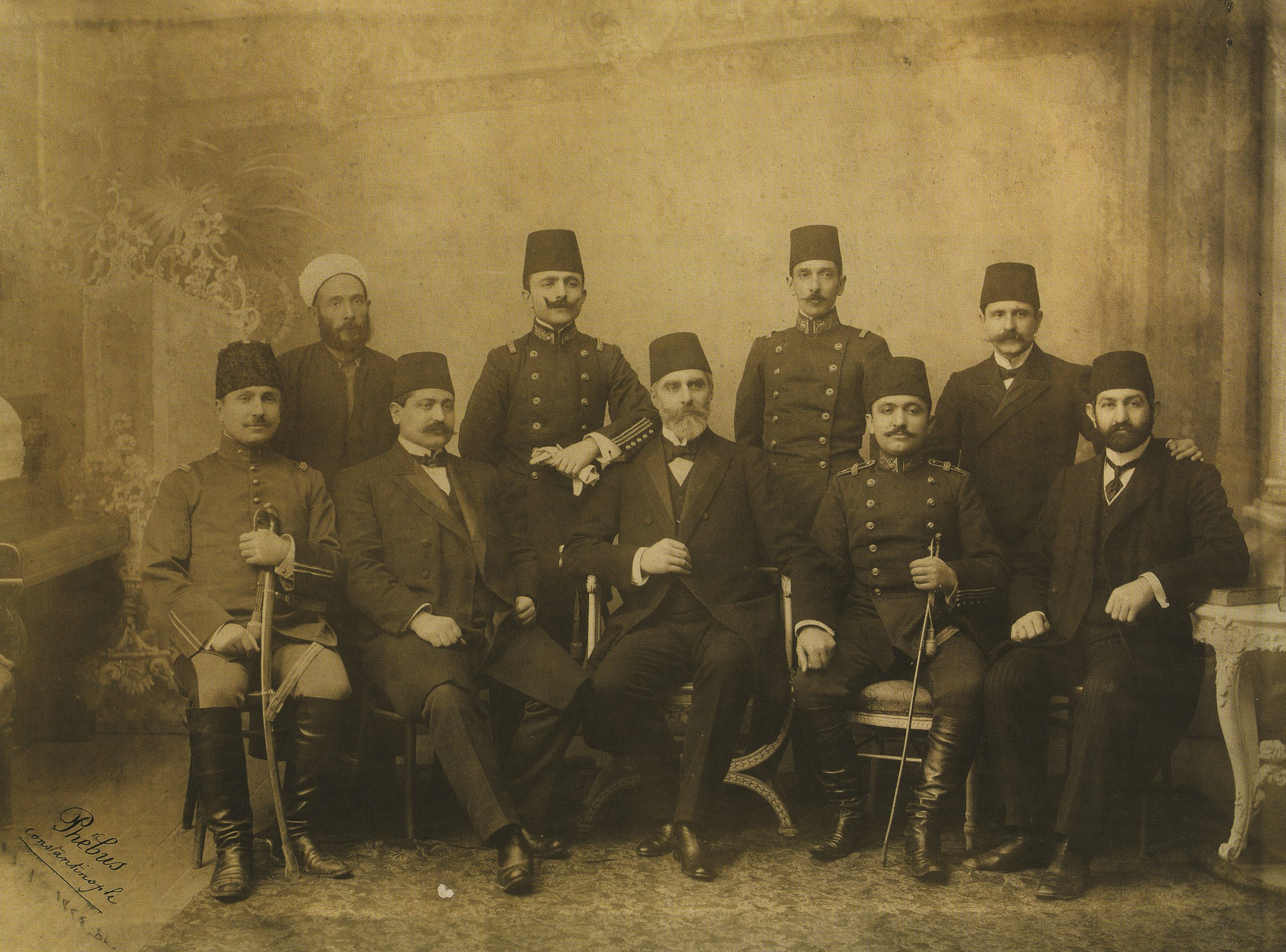
Members of the Central Committee of the CUP proclaiming the Second Constitutional Era. Standing from left: Hafız İbrahim Efendi, Enver Pasha, Hüseyin Kadri Bey, Mithat Şükrü Bleda. Sitting from left: Habib Bey, Talaat Pasha, Ahmet Rıza Bey, Hafız Hakkı Pasha, Hayri Bey.

The CUP succeeded in reestablishing democracy and constitutionalism in the Ottoman Empire but chose not to overthrow Abdul Hamid, choosing instead to monitor the situation from the sidelines. This was because its members were mostly junior officers and bureaucrats and held little to no skill in statecraft, while the organisation itself held little power outside of Rumelia. Besides, only a small fraction of the army's lower ranking officer corps were loyal to the committee, and total membership numbered around approximately 2,250. The CUP continued its clandestine nature by keeping its membership secret but sent to Constantinople a delegation of seven high-ranking Unionists known as the Committee of Seven, including Talât, Cemal, and Cavid to monitor the government. After the revolution, power was informally shared between the palace (Abdul Hamid), the liberated Sublime Porte, and the CUP, whose Central Committee was still in Salonica, and now represented a powerful deep state faction. The CUP's continued status as a secret society quickly earned ire from genuine democrats and prompted accusations of authoritarianism.

An early victory of the CUP over Abdul Hamid happened on 1 August, when Abdul Hamid was forced to assign ministries according to the Central Committee's will. Four days later, the CUP told the government that the Grand Vizier (at this point a de jure prime ministerial title) Mehmed Said Pasha was unacceptable to them, and had Kâmil Pasha appointed Grand Vizier. Kâmil later proved to be too independent for the CUP. Facing a vote of no confidence, he was forced to resign. He was replaced by Hüseyin Hilmi Pasha who was more partial towards the committee.

Morale was high amongst Ottomans following revolution, but in the lead up to the election, dissatisfaction of the Young Turks' unfulfilled promises to improve worker's rights lead to a major worker strike wave across the empire. The CUP initially supported the strikes to gain more popular support, but soon assisted the government in controlling organised labor by supporting factory owners in their disputes with their workers and sending gendarme and soldiers to crack down on railroad strikes. By October workers unions and labor injunctions were declared illegal (see Socialism in the Ottoman Empire).

In the Ottoman general election of 1908 the CUP captured almost every seat in the Chamber of Deputies, but the discord surrounding the new constitutional order resulted in a reliably Unionist parliamentary group only 60 deputies strong (out of 275) despite its leading role in the revolution. Other parties represented in parliament included the Armenian Dashnak and Hunchak parties (with four and two members respectively) and the main opposition, Sabahaddin's Liberty Party.

A sign of how the CUP power worked occurred in February 1909, when a certain Ali Haydar, who had just been appointed ambassador to Spain, went to the Sublime Porte to discuss his new appointment with Hilmi Pasha, only be to be informed by the Grand Vizier he needed to confer with a man from the Central Committee who was due to arrive shortly.

=== 31 March Mutiny ===
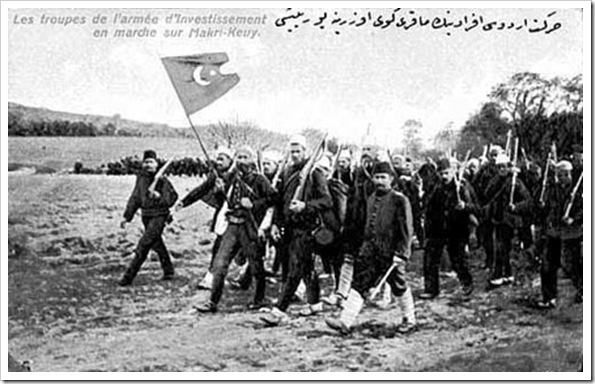
Action Army marching on Bakırköy

The murder of the anti-Unionist journalist Hasan Fehmi on 6 April was widely seen as an assassination by the CUP. His funeral turned into a demonstration against the committee when a crowd of 50,000 assembled in Sultanahmet Square and eventually in front of the parliament. These events served to be the backdrop of the 31 March incident.

Days afterward, discontent against the CUP and disappointment from broken promises culminated in an uprising by reactionaries and liberals. The members of the Liberty Party that took part in the uprising lost control of the situation and the sultan reluctantly accepted the mob's demands, again suspending the constitution and shuttering the parliament. The uprising was localised in the capital, so MPs and other Unionists were able to flee and organise. Talât was able to escape to Aya Stefanos (Yeşilköy) with 100 deputies to organise a counter government.

In the military, Mahmud Şevket Pasha assembled a strike force of Macedonian troops loyal to the constitution called the "Action Army" (Turkish: Hareket Ordusu) and marched on Constantinople. Upon the Action Army arriving at Ayastefanos, it was secretly agreed that Abdul Hamid would be deposed. Constantinople was taken back within a few days and order was restored through many courts marshals and executions, and the constitution was reinstated for the third and final time. Abdul Hamid II was deposed via a fatwa issued by the Shaykh-al-Islam and a unanimous vote of the Ottoman Parliament. Abdul Hamid's younger half-brother replaced him and took the name Mehmed V, committing to the role of a constitutional monarch and figurehead of the future CUP party-state. An extensive set of constitutional amendments would be signed into law that weakened the Sultan's powers in favor of parliament and the Sublime Porte.

=== 1909–1911 ===
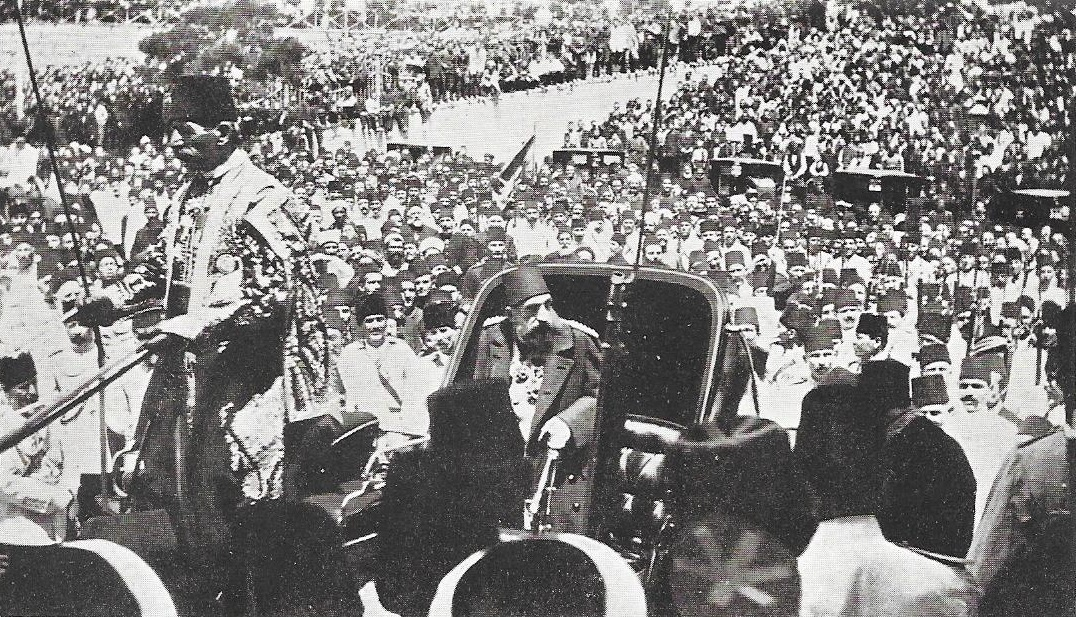
Abdul Hamid II at Selanik, where he was exiled after his dethronement in the 31 March Incident

The years after the 31 March Crisis were much less free compared to the euphoric start of the Second Constitutional Era. Martial Law was implemented in the wake of the counter-coup, which would continue until the demise of the empire, save for a brief interruption in 1912. The Liberty Party's reluctant support for the counter revolution meant that the party was banned. The Unionists expected more influence in the government for their role in foiling the countercoup, and maneuvered Cavid into the Finance Ministry in June, becoming the first CUP affiliated cabinet minister. Two months later, Talât was appointed minister of interior. While the CUP survived the failed countercoup and gained more control over the government, their influence was checked by the "generalissimo" Mahmud Şevket Pasha. Şevket, representing the military, butted heads with the CUP as he represented the only opposition to them other than the small Ottoman Democratic Party after the 31 March Incident.

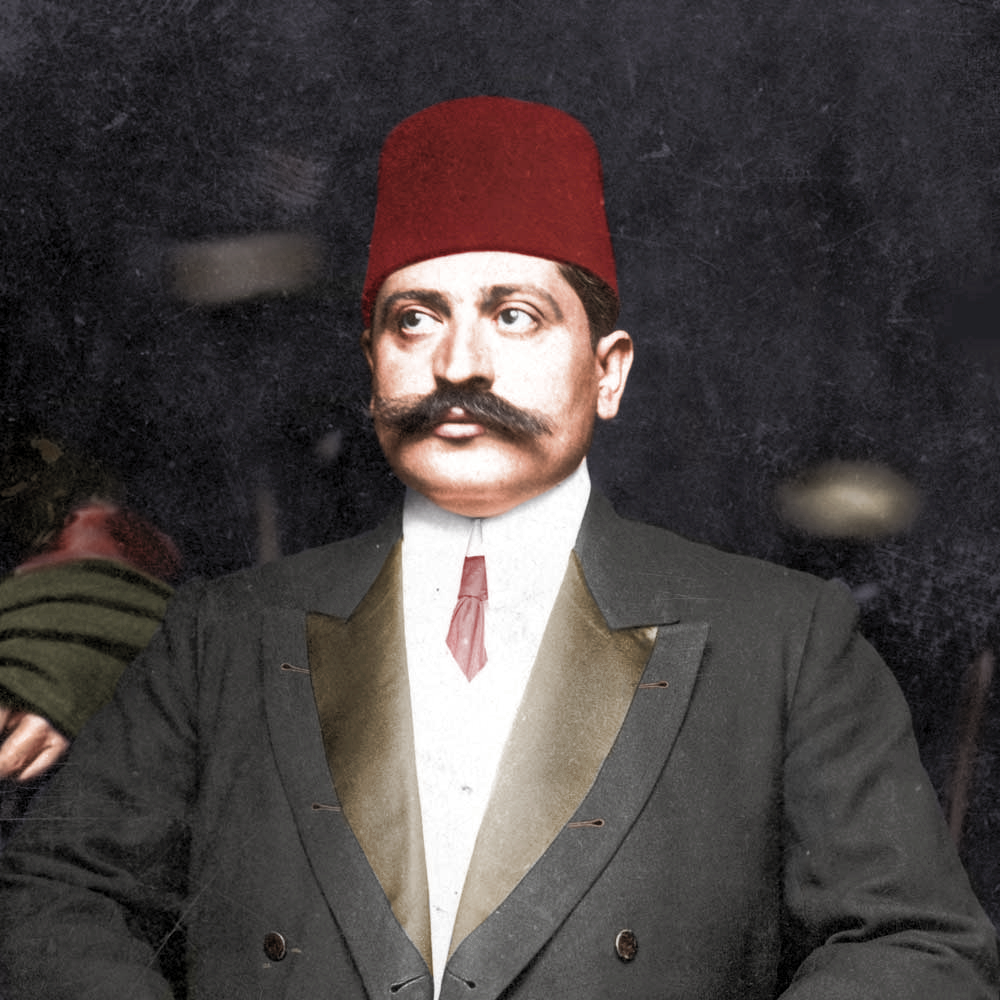
Talât Pasha, leader of the CUP and the Three Pashas triumvirate. By 1917, he was both Grand Vizier and Interior Minister.

In its 1909 congress in Salonica, the Committee of Union and Progress formally established itself as a political party. The committee pledged to increase transparency with the public by discontinuing initiation ceremonies and other conspiratorial practices, though neither were ever achieved. The committee continued to influence politics in the backrooms and through the occasional assassination (see Ahmet Samim), inviting criticism that the committee was opaque and authoritarian rather than a force of democracy. Mustafa Kemal delivered a speech criticizing the politicization of the officer corps, resulting in him being ostracized by CUP. Pan-Turkism was introduced in its party program for an eventual union with the other Turkic populations in the world. By the end of 1909, Union and Progress was both a committee and a party with 850,000 members and 360 branches spread across the country. In 1910 Ahmed Rıza nominated the CUP for a Nobel Peace Prize "...for its advocacy to bring peace in the Ottoman Empire."

In the summer of 1909, the CUP government introduced several laws designed to settle the question of Ottomanism through an egalitarian approach. The Unionists hoped these reforms would dismantle the Millet system: a system of traditional autonomy minority religious groups enjoyed which was incompatible to the CUP's desire of a centralised, equal, and above all, rational society. Conscription was reformed to apply to all Ottoman citizens, instead of just Muslims that weren't enrolled in Madrasas. This caused an uproar from the traditionally exempted non-Muslim communities and the Ulema. The Bulgarians wished for segregated units with Christian commanders and priests, which was struck down by the committee. Other laws were introduced with assimilation in mind: The Law of Associations banned minority interest parties. The Law of Public Education banned all languages in school except for Turkish as the language of instruction. This led to the Albanian Revolt of 1910. As its leaders grew more and more frustrated by ethnic politics the CUP adopted an explictely Turkish nationalist ideology. This was seen in the expanding influence of the Unionist journalist Hüseyin Cahid, who propagated for the supremacy of the Turkish nation (millet-i hâkime), which drew backlash from the Armenian press and consternation from their Dashnak allies.

CUP and the Dashnak held a tenuous alliance throughout the Second Constitutional Era, with their cooperation dating back to the Second Congress of Ottoman Opposition of 1907; as both were united in overthrowing the Hamidian regime for a constitutional one. During the countercoup, massacres against Ottoman Armenians in Adana occurred that was facilitated by members of the local CUP branch, straining the alliance between the CUP and Dashnak. The committee made up for this by nominating Ahmed Cemal as governor of Adana. Cemal restored order, providing compensation to victims and bringing (light) justice to the perpetrators, thus mending the relations between the two committees.

In February 1910 several parties splintered from the Union and Progress Party, including the People's Party, Ottoman Committee of Alliance, and the Moderate Liberty Party.

=== Dealing with war, rebellion, and conspiracy ===
In September 1911, Italy submitted an ultimatum containing terms clearly meant to provoke a rejection, and following the expected rejection, invaded Ottoman Tripolitania. The Unionist officers in the army were determined to resist the Italian aggression, and the parliament had succeeded in passing the "Law for the Prevention of Brigandage and Sedition", a measure ostensibly intended to prevent insurgency against the central government, which assigned that duty to newly created paramilitary formations. These later came under the control of the Special Organisation (Teşkilât-ı Mahsusa), which was used to conduct guerrilla operations against the Italians in Libya. Those who had once served as fedâiin assassins during the years of underground struggle were often assigned as leaders of the Special Organisation. The ultra-secretive Special Organisation answered to the Central Committee, and in the future worked closely with the Ministry of War and Ministry of Interior. A great many CUP officers, including Enver, his younger brother Nuri, Mustafa Kemal, Süleyman Askerî, and Ali Fethi (Okyar) departed to Libya to fight the Italians.

With many of the Unionist officers in Libya, this weakened the power of the CUP and the army at home. As a consequence of the Italian invasion, İbrahim Hakkı Pasha's Unionist government collapsed and two factions formed from the CUP: the right-wing New Party, and the left-wing Progress Party. The New Party faction was led by Miralay Sadık, a Unionist disillusioned with the society's continued conspiratorial characteristics who would force Talât and his supporters to resign from government. The CUP formed a coalition government with some minor parties under Mehmed Said Pasha. Another blow against the CUP came in mid-November, when the opposition parties coalesced around a new big tent party known as the Freedom and Accord Party, which immediately attracted 70 deputies to its ranks. Censorship and restrictions on gatherings were implemented in a context of increasing polarisation between the CUP and its opposition.

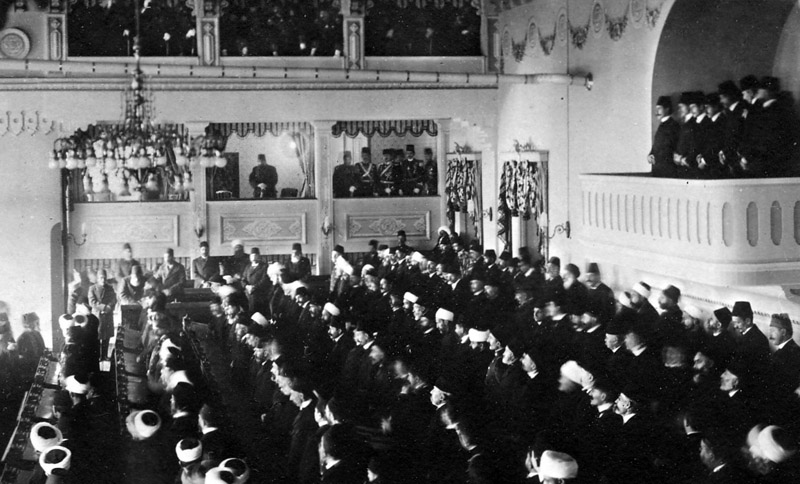
Opening of the Ottoman Parliament, 1908

When it came time for general elections in April 1912, held in the midst of the war with Italy and one of many Albanian revolts, Union and Progress and the Dashnaks campaigned for the elections under an electoral alliance. Alarmed at the success of Freedom and Accord and increasingly radicalised, Union and Progress won 269 of the 275 seats in parliament through electoral fraud and violence, which led to the election being known as the "Election of Clubs" (Turkish: Sopalı Seçimler), leaving the Freedom and Accord just six seats. Although they won ten seats from the CUP lists, the Dashnaks were disappointed with the alliance and terminated it.

In May 1912, Miralay Sadık left the CUP and organised a group of pro-Freedom and Accord army officers calling themselves the Saviour Officers Group, which demanded the immediate dissolution of the Unionist dominated parliament. The fraudulent electoral result of the "Election of Clubs" had badly hurt the popular legitimacy of not only the CUP but the government itself, and faced with widespread opposition and Mahmud Şevket Pasha's resignation as Minister of War in support of the officers, Said's Unionist government resigned on 9 July 1912. It was replaced by Ahmed Muhtar Pasha's "Great Cabinet" that deliberately excluded the Unionists by being made up of older ministers, many of which were associated with the Ancien Régime. On 5 August 1912, Muhtar Pasha's government shuttered the CUP dominated parliament and called for snap elections, which would never happen due to the outbreak of war in the Balkans. For the moment, the CUP had become isolated, driven from power, and risked being banned by the government.

With the CUP out of power, in the lead up to the elections, the party challenged Muhtar's government to a jingoistic game of pro-war populism against the Balkan states by utilising its still powerful propaganda network. Unbeknownst to the CUP, the Sublime Porte, and most international observers, Bulgaria, Serbia, Montenegro, and Greece were already preparing war against the Empire in an alliance known as the Balkan League. On 4 October, the CUP organised a pro-war rally in Sultanahmet Square. On 8 October, Montenegro declared war on the Ottoman Empire, starting the First Balkan War, with the rest of its allies joining in during the week. The Ottoman Empire and Italy concluded a peace treaty that the Empire could focus on the Balkan states, in which Tripolitania was annexed and the Dodecanese were occupied by Italy. This proved too little and too late to salvage Rumelia; Albania, Macedonia, and western Thrace was lost, Edirne was put under siege, and Constantinople was in serious risk of being overrun by the Bulgarian army (see First Battle of Çatalca). Edirne was a symbolic city, as it was an important city in Ottoman history, serving as the Empire's third capital for nearly one hundred years, and together with Salonica represented Europe's Islamic heritage.

Muhtar Pasha's government resigned on the 29th of October following total military defeat in Rumelia for Kâmil Pasha's return, whose ministry began to persecute the committee. With the loss of Salonica to Greece the CUP was forced to relocate its Central Committee to Istanbul, but by mid-November the new headquarters was shut down by the government and its members were forced into hiding.

== 1913 coup d'état ==
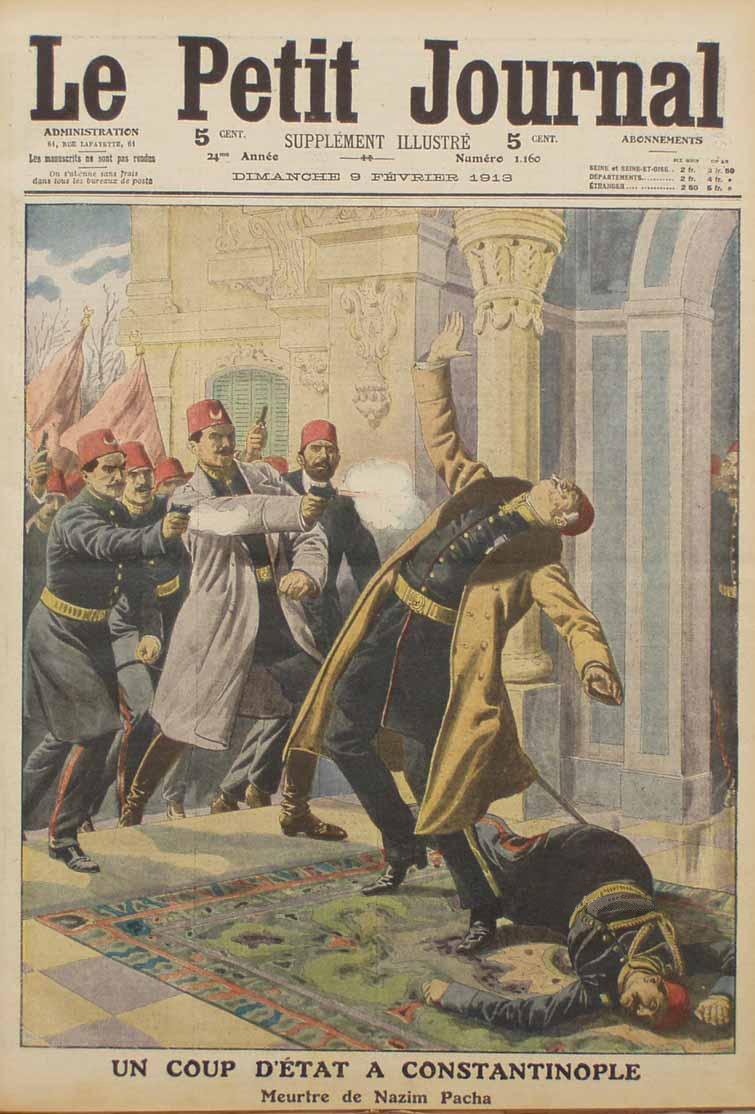
The front page of the Le Petit Journal magazine in February 1913 depicting the murder of Minister of War Nâzım Pasha during the 1913 coup

Grand Vizier Kâmil Pasha and his Interior Minister Ahmed Reşid wished to ban the CUP, so the CUP launched a preemptive strike: a coup d'état known as the Raid on the Sublime Porte on 23 January 1913. During the coup Kâmil Pasha was forced to resign as Grand Vizier at gunpoint and War Minister Nâzım Pasha was accidentally murdered. The coup was justified under the grounds that Kâmil Pasha was about to "sell out the nation" by agreeing to a truce in the First Balkan War and giving up Edirne. The intention of the new leadership, dominated by Talât, Enver, Cemal, under Şevket Pasha's premiership (who reluctantly accepted the role), was to break the truce and renew the war against Bulgaria.

The CUP once again did not take over the government, instead opting for the creation of a national unity government; only four Unionist ministers were appointed into the new government. The immediate aftermath of the coup resulted in a much more severe state of emergency than previous governments had ever implemented. Cemal in his new capacity as military commander of Constantinople was responsible for arresting many and heavily stifling opposition. At this point the Unionists were no longer concerned with their actions being considered constitutional.

The pro-war regime immediately withdrew the Empire's delegation from the London conference on the same day it took power. The first task of the new regime was to found the National Defense League on 1 February 1913 which was intended to mobilise the resources of the empire for an all-out effort to turn the tide. On 3 February 1913 the war resumed. In the Battle of Şarköy, the new government staked a daring operation in which XX Army Corps made an amphibious landing at the rear of the Bulgarians at Şarköy while the Straits Composite Force was to break out of the Gallipoli peninsula. The operation failed due to a lack of co-ordination with heavy losses. Following reports that the Ottoman army had at most 165,000 troops to oppose the 400,000 of the League army together with news that morale in the army was poor due to Edirne's surrender to Bulgaria on 26 March, the pro-war regime finally agreed to an armistice on 1 April 1913 and signed the Treaty of London on 30 May, acknowledging the loss of all of Rumelia except for Constantinople.

News of the failure to rescue Rumelia by the CUP prompted the organisation of a countercoup by Kâmil Pasha that would overthrow the CUP and bring Freedom and Accord back into power. Kâmil Pasha was put under house arrest on 28 May, but the conspiracy continued and aimed to assassinate Grand Vizier Mahmud Şevket Pasha and major Unionists. On 11 June, Şevket Pasha was assassinated. He had represented the last independent personality in the Empire; with his assassination, the CUP took full control over the country. The power vacuum in the army created by Şevket's death was filled by the committee. Any remaining opposition to the CUP, especially Freedom and Accord, was suppressed and their leaders exiled. All provincial and local officials reported to "Responsible Secretaries" chosen by the party for each Vilayet. Mehmed V appointed Said Halim Pasha, an Egyptian royal who was loosely affiliated with the committee, to serve as Grand Vizier until Talât replaced him in 1917. A courts marshal sentenced to death 16 opposition leaders, including Prince Sabahaddin who was sentenced in absentia, as he already fled to Geneva in exile.

After surrendering in the First Balkan War, the CUP was fixated on retaking Edirne, while other important issues like economic collapse, reform in Eastern Anatolia, and infrastructure were largely ignored. On 20 July 1913, following the outbreak of the Second Balkan War, the Ottomans attacked Bulgaria and, on 21 July 1913, Colonel Enver retook Edirne from Bulgaria, further increasing his status as a national hero. By the terms of the Treaty of Bucharest in September 1913, the Ottomans regained some of the land lost in Thrace during the First Balkan War.

== The regime ==
The new regime was a dictatorship dominated by a triumvirate that turned the Ottoman Empire into a one party state of Union and Progress, known in history as the Three Pashas Triumvirate. Members of Said Halim Pasha's cabinet, the triumvirate consisted of Talât who returned to the Interior Ministry, Enver who became War Minister, and Cemal who became Naval Minister and de facto ruler of Syria, all of whom soon became Pashas. Some historians claim that Halil (Menteşe) was a fourth member of this clique. Scholar Hans-Lukas Kieser asserts that this state of rule by a triumvirate is only accurate for the year 1913–1914, and that Talât increasingly became a more central figure within the Union and Progress party state, especially once he also became Grand Vizier in 1917. Alternatively, it is also accurate to call the Unionist regime a clique or even an oligarchy, as many prominent Committeemen held some form of de jure or de facto power. Other than the Three Pashas and Halil, éminence grises such as Dr. Nâzım, Bahattin Şakir, Ziya Gökalp, and the party's secretary general Midhat Şükrü at times also dominated the Central Committee without formal positions in the Ottoman government.

The CUP regime was less hierarchically totalitarian than future European dictatorships. Instead of relying on strict chains of command the regime functioned through the balancing of factions through massive corruption and kickbacks. Individual governors were allowed much autonomy, such as Cemal Pasha's reign of Syria and Mustafa Rahmi's governorship of the Aydin vilayet. Loyalty to the committee was seen more valuable than competence. This lack of rule of law, lack of respect to the constitution, and extreme corruption worsened as the regime aged.

== Nationalist pivot (1913–1914) ==
The Macedonian Conflict and its conclusion in the Balkan Wars was traumatic for the Ottomans, but especially so for the Ottomanists. The expulsion of Muslims from the lost land not only shocked Muslims with memories from the 1877-78 war with Russia, but also CUP Central Committee members, most of whom hailed from the Balkans or at least Constantinople. With the integrity of Ottomanism severely diminished, exclusionary Turkism became the committee's goal. Muslim Albanians did not become any more loyal to the empire after the Young Turk Revolution, whilst the defeat in the First Balkan War had showed that the empire's Christian population were potential fifth columns. In addition, lack of action by the European powers in upholding the integrity of the Empire and the status quo of the Berlin Treaty during the Balkan Wars meant to the "sacred committee" that the Turks were on their own. However the CUP lost much respect for the European powers when they reconquered Edirne against the European powers' wishes. This abandonment of Ottomanism was much more feasible due to the new borders of the Empire after the Balkan Wars, inflating the proportion of Turks and especially Muslims in the empire at the expense of Christians.

=== Rhetoric ===
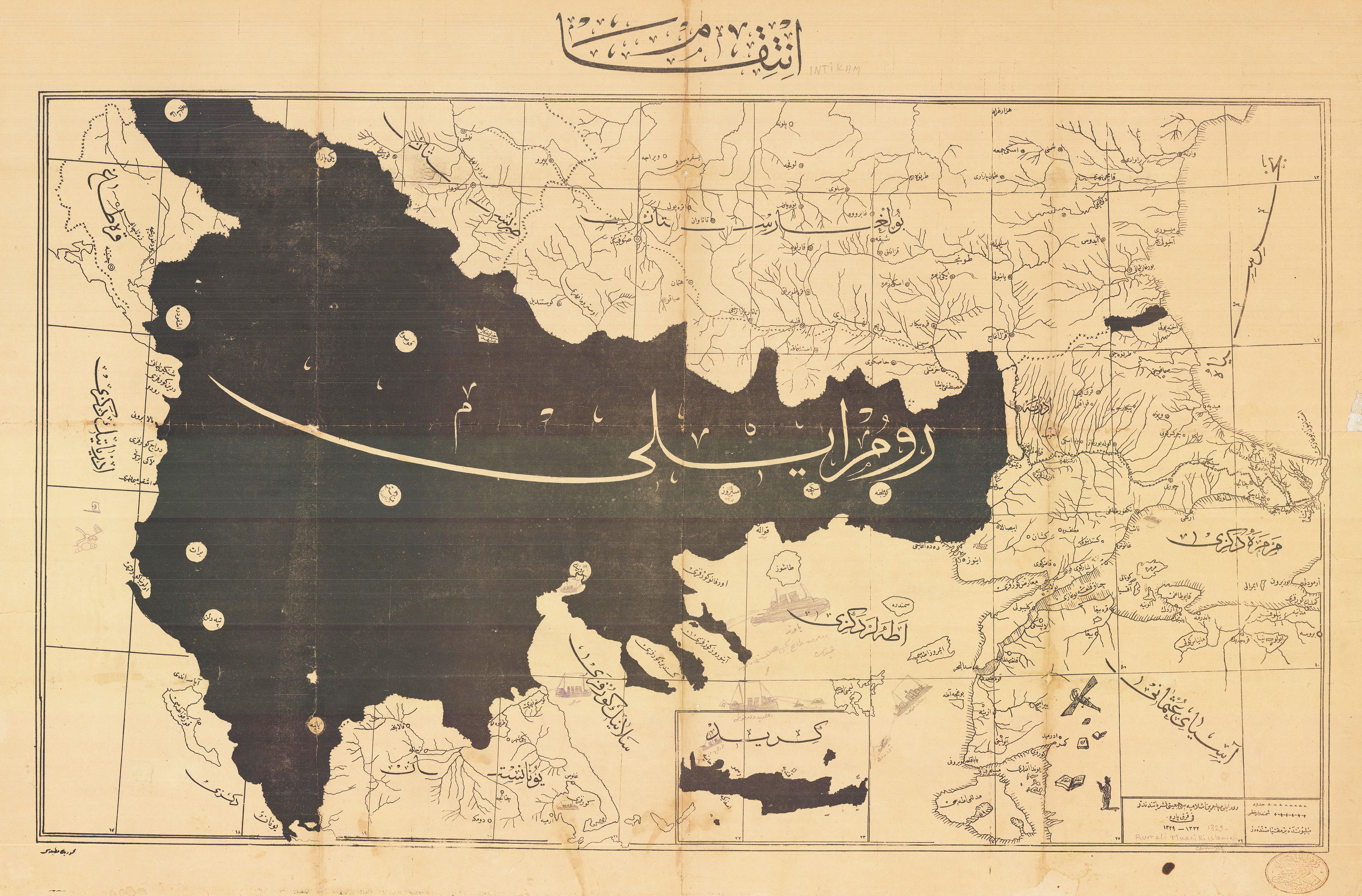
The Revenge Map, published by the Society of Muslim Refugees from Rumeliya. In black is the part of the Ottoman Empire lost during the Balkan Wars from which many Muhacirs fled.

From its end, the triumvirate which dominated the CUP did not accept the outcome of the Balkan wars as final, and a major aim of the new regime was to take back all of the territory which had been lost. A school textbook from 1914 captured the burning desire for revenge:

In the year 1330 [1912] the Balkan states allied against the Ottoman government... In the meantime, they shed the blood of many innocent Muslim and Turkish people. Many women and children were massacred. Villages were burnt down. Now in the Balkans under every stone, there lay thousands of dead bodies, with eyes and stomachs carved out, awaiting revenge... It is our duty to our fatherland, as sons of the fatherland, to restore our stolen rights, and to work to take revenge for the many innocent people whose blood were shed in abundance. Then let us work to instill that sense of revenge, love of fatherland and sense of sacrifice for it.

In the aftermath of the First Balkan War hundreds of thousands of refugees from Rumelia arrived with tales of atrocities committed by the Greek, Montenegrin, Serb and Bulgarian forces. A marked anti-Christian and xenophobic mood settled in amongst many Ottoman Muslims. The CUP encouraged boycotts against Austrian, Bulgarian, and Greek businesses, but after 1913 also against the empire's own Christian and Jewish citizens.

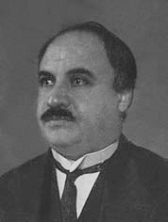
Ziya Gökalp, ideologue of the committee and later member of Mustafa Kemal's Grand National Assembly

The new regime starting to glorify the "Turkish race" after abandoning the multi-culture ideal of Ottomanism. Particular attention was paid to Turan, the mythical homeland of the Turks that was located north of China. A much greater emphasis was put on Turkish nationalism with the Turks being glorified in endless poems, pamphlets, newspaper articles and speeches as a great warrior nation who needed to recapture their former glory. The chief ideologue of the CUP, Ziya Gökalp, complained in a 1913 essay that "the sword of the Turk and likewise his pen have exalted the Arabs, the Chinese and the Persians" rather than themselves and that the modern Turks "needed to turn back to their ancient past". Gökalp argued it was time for the Turks to start following such great "Turanian" heroes as Attila, Genghis Khan, Tamerlane the Great and Hulagu Khan. As such, the Turks needed to become the dominant political and economic group within the Ottoman Empire while uniting with all of the other Turkic peoples in Russia and Persia to create a vast pan-Turkic state covering much of Asia and Europe. In his poem "Turan", Gökalp wrote: "The land of the Turks is not Turkey, nor yet Turkestan. Their country is the eternal land: Turan". The pan-Turanian propaganda was significant for not being based upon Islam, but was rather a call for the unity of the Turkic peoples based upon a shared history and supposed common racial origins together a pan-Asian message stressing the role of the Turkic peoples as the fiercest warriors in all of Asia. The CUP planned on taking back all of the territory that the Ottomans had lost during the course of the 19th century and under the banner of pan-Turkic nationalism to acquire new territory in the Caucasus and Central Asia.

=== New institutions ===
Right from the time of the 1913 coup d'état, the new government planned to wage a total war, and wished to indoctrinate the entire Turkish population, especially the young people, for it. In June 1913, the government founded the Turkish Strength Association, a paramilitary group run by former army officers which all young Turkish men were encouraged to join. The Turkish Strength Association featured much physical exercise and military training intended to let the Turks become the "warlike nation in arms" and ensure that the current generation of teenagers "who, in order to save the deteriorating Turkish race from extinction, would learn to be self-sufficient and ready to die for fatherland, honour and pride". In May 1914, the Turkish Strength Association was replaced with the Ottoman Strength Clubs, which were very similar except for the fact that the Ottoman Strength Clubs were run by the Ministry of War and membership was compulsory for Turkish males between the ages of 10–17. Even more so than the Turkish Strength Association, the Ottoman Strength Clubs were meant to train the nation for war with an ultra-nationalist propaganda and military training featuring live-fire exercises being an integral part of its activities. The CUP created a number of semi-official organisations such as the Ottoman Navy League, the Ottoman Red Crescent Society and the National Defense League that were intended to engage the Ottoman public with the entire modernisation project by promoting their nationalist and militaristic ways of thinking. Reflecting Colmar Freiherr von der Goltz Pasha's influence, especially his "nation in arms" theory, the purpose of the society under the new regime was to support the military.

In January 1914, Enver became a Pasha and was appointed Minister of War, supplanting the calmer Ahmet İzzet Pasha, which made Russia, especially its Foreign Minister Sergey Sazonov, greatly suspicious. An extensive purge of the army was carried out, with about 1,100 officers including 2 field marshals, 3 generals, 30 lieutenant-generals, 95 major-generals and 184 colonels whom Enver had considered to be inept or disloyal forced to take early retirement.

Absent the wartime atmosphere, the Unionists did not yet purge minority religions from political life; at least 23 Christians joined it and were elected to the fifth parliament in 1914, in which the Union and Progress Party was the only contender. The CUP and Dashnak still maintained cordial relations, and in February 1914 concluded negotiations of the passage of a reform package for the eastern provinces which would be administered in cooperation with European inspectorates. However relations with the Hunchaks came to an end when intelligence services revealed a plot to assassinate key leaders of the CUP. Those involved were arrested in 1913, and hanged in June 1915. The reform package also turned out to be stillborn, being abandoned by October once the Ottoman Empire entered World War I.

=== Early acts of demographic engineering ===
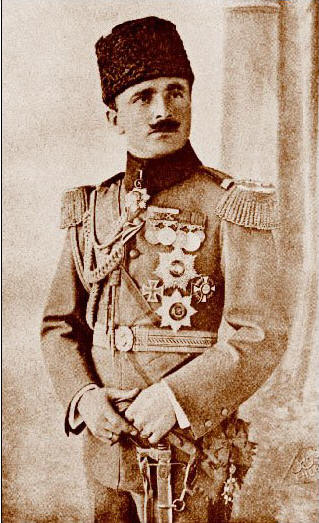
Enver Pasha, the Minister of War

Many Unionists were traumatised from the outcome of the Macedonian Question and the loss of most of Rumelia. The winners of the 1877-78 Russo-Turkish war and the First Balkan War applied anti-Muslim ethnic cleansing measures against its citizens, which the CUP reacted with similar fever against the Empire's Christian minorities but on a much greater scale in the future. With the Macedonian Question's conclusion, attention was now given to Anatolia and the Armenian Question. Not wanting Anatolia to turn into another Macedonia, the CUP concluded that Anatolia would become the homeland of the Turks through policies of homogeneity in order to save both "Turkdom" and the empire. The CUP would engage in an "... increasingly radicalised demographic engineering program aimed at the ethno-religious homogenisation of Anatolia from 1913 till the end of World War I".

To that end, before the committee's exterminatory anti-Armenian policies, anti-Greek policies were in order. Mahmud Celaleddin (Bayar), who was appointed local secretary of the Union and Progress Party branch of Smyrna (modern İzmir), as well as Talât and Enver Pasha, formulated a terror campaign against the Greek population in the İzmir vilayet with the aim of "cleansing" the area. The purpose of the campaign was described in a CUP document:

The [Committee of] Union and Progress made a clear decision. The source of the trouble in western Anatolia would be removed, the Greeks would be cleared out by means of political and economic measures. Before anything else, it would be necessary to weaken and break the economically powerful Greeks.

The campaign did not proceed with the same level of brutality as did the Armenian genocide during 1915 as the Unionists were afraid of a hostile foreign reaction, but during the "cleansing" operations in the spring of 1914 carried out by the CUP's Special Organisation it is estimated at least 300,000 Greeks fled across the Aegean to Greece. In July 1914, the "cleansing operation" was stopped following protests from the ambassadors to the Porte with the French ambassador Maurice Bompard speaking especially strongly in defence of the Greeks, as well as the threat of war from Greece. In many ways, the operation against Ottoman Greeks in 1914 was a trial run for the operations that were launched against Armenians in 1915.

In September, irregular warfare against Russia on the Caucasian border commenced. The CUP sent delegates to the Eighth Congress of the Dashnak Party where they deliberated their stance on the incoming Great War. In the end, the Dashnaks pledged to use their militants to defend the Ottoman Empire in the coming war, but refused to incite rebellion amongst Russian Armenians. Later that month Russian Foreign Minister Sazonov permitted the organisation of Ottoman Armenian irregular volunteer regiments (some Ottoman Armenians fled to Russian Tbilisi at this point). When deportations of Armenian civilians during World War I begin, Dashnak and Hunchak leaders would be arrested and executed, driving the Armenian nationalist organisations towards Russia. Dashnak militants would rearm and integrate themselves into Russian sponsored volunteer units during the war, while the Hunchaks continued to operate separate guerilla bands.

=== Cementing ties with Germany ===
Following the 1913 coup, the CUP initiated a massive arms-buying spree, buying as many weapons from Germany as possible while asking for a new German military mission to be sent to the empire, which would not only train the Ottoman army, but also command Ottoman troops in the field. In December 1913, the new German military mission under the command of General Otto Liman von Sanders arrived to take command of the Ottoman army. Enver, who was determined to uphold his own power, did not allow the German officers the sort of wide-ranging authority over the Ottoman army that the German-Ottoman agreement of October 1913 had envisioned. At the same time, the Unionist government was seeking allies for the war of revenge it planned to launch as soon as possible. Ahmet İzzet Pasha, Chief of the General Staff recalled: "... what I expected from an alliance based on defence and security, while others' expectations depended upon total attack and assault. Without doubt, the leaders of the CUP were anxiously looking for ways to compensate for the pain of the defeats, which the population blamed on them."

Tensions in Europe rapidly increased as the events of the July Crisis unfolded. The CUP saw the July Crisis as the perfect chance to revise the outcome of the loss of Rumelia in the Balkan wars and the loss of the six vilayets in the Berlin Treaty through an alliance with a European power. With the decline of the fortunes of Ottoman Anglophile, Germany took advantage of the situation by reestablishing its friendship with the Ottoman Empire that dated back to the Hamidian Era. It was a small faction within the government and the CUP, first and foremost headed by Talât, Enver, and Halil, that solidified an alliance with Germany with an equally small faction within the German government in the form of Freiherr von Wangenheim that brought the Empire into the First World War.

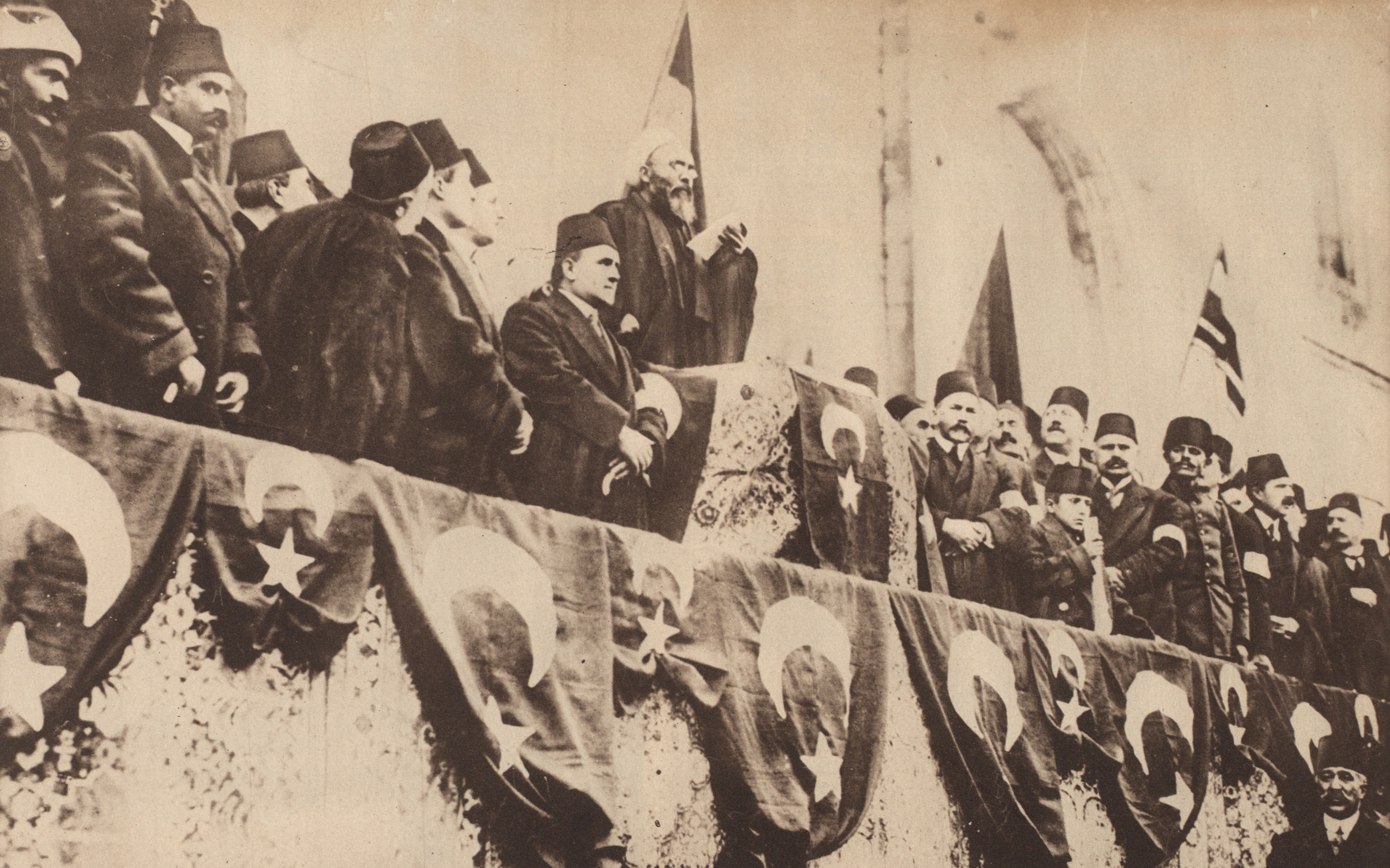
Fetva emini Ali Haydar Efendi delivering Mehmed V's Declaration of Holy War

After much politicking by Wangenheim, German influence in the Empire noticeably increased through media acquisitions and increasing presence of the German military mission in the capital. On 1 August 1914, the Empire ordered a partial mobilisation. On 2 August, the Ottoman and German governments signed a secret alliance. The purpose of this alliance was to bring the Empire into World War I. That same day Wangenheim had informed the Ottoman cabinet that the German Mediterranean squadron under Admiral Wilhelm Souchon was steaming towards Constantinople, known as the famous pursuit of the Goeben and Breslau, and requested that the Ottomans grant the squadron sanctuary once it arrived (to which the government gladly obliged). On 16 August, a phony deal was signed with the Ottoman government supposedly buying the Goeben and Breslau for US$ 86 million, but with the German officers and crews remaining aboard. On 19 August, another secret alliance with Bulgaria negotiated by Talât and Halil and Bulgarian Prime Minister Vasil Radoslavov was signed. August 3 came the order of general mobilisation.

On 21 October, Enver Pasha informed the Germans that his plans for the war were now complete and he was already moving his troops towards eastern Anatolia to invade the Russian Caucasus and to Palestine to attack the British in Egypt. To provide a pretext for the war, Enver and Cemal Pasha (at this point Minister of the Navy) ordered Admiral Souchon to attack the Russian Black Sea ports with the newly christened Yavuz and Midilli and other Ottoman gunboats in the expectation that Russia would declare war in response; the attack was carried out on the 29th.

After this act of aggression against his country, Russia declared war on Turkey on 2 November 1914. The triumvirate called a special session of the Central Committee to explain that the time for the empire to enter the war had now come, and defined the war aim as: "the destruction of our Muscovite enemy [Russia] in order to obtain thereby a natural frontier to our empire, which should include and unite all the branches of our race". This meeting caused a cabinet crisis as half the cabinet of Unionist dove ministers resigned, including the Minister of Finance Cavid. On 5 November, Britain and France declared war on the Empire. On 11 November 1914, Mehmed V declared war on Russia, Britain, and France. Later that month, in his capacity as Caliph of all Muslims, he issued a declaration of jihad against the Entente ordering all Muslims everywhere in the world to fight for the destruction of those nations.

With the expectation that the new war would free the Empire of its constraints on its sovereignty by the great powers, Talât went ahead with accomplishing major goals of the CUP; unilaterally abolishing the centuries-old Capitulations, prohibiting foreign postal services, terminating Lebanon's autonomy, and suspending the reform package for the Eastern Anatolian provinces that was in effect for just seven months. This unilateral action prompted a joyous rally in Sultanahmet Square.

== World War I and genocidal policies (1914–1918) ==
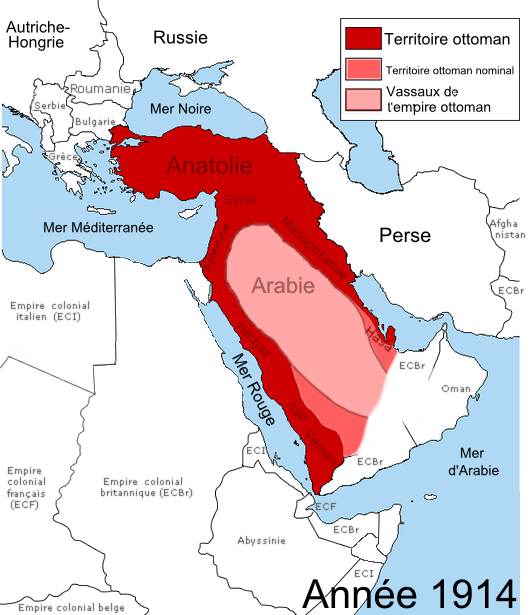
Map of the Ottoman Empire on the eve of World War I

Although the CUP had worked with the Dashnaks during the Second Constitutional Era, factions in the CUP began to view Armenians as a fifth column that would betray the Ottoman cause after war with nearby Russia broke out in 1914; these factions gained more power after the 1913 coup d'état. After the Ottoman Empire entered the war, most Ottoman Armenians sought to proclaim their loyalty to the empire with prayers being said in Armenian churches for a swift Ottoman victory; only a minority worked for a Russian victory. In the early months of 1915, the Unionist-controlled press still emphasised the importance of the Armenian nation to the Ottoman war effort. A report presented to Talât and Cevdet (governor of Van Vilayet) by Dashnak members Arshak Vramian and Vahan Papazian on atrocities committed by the Special Organisation against Armenians in Van created more friction between the two organisations. However, the Unionists were still not yet confident enough to purge Armenians from politics or pursue policies of ethnic engineering.

The CUP pushed the country into the war with the expectation that jihad would spell the collapse of the colonial empires of the Entente, and that the Muslim Turkic peoples of Central Asia would assist the Ottomans with an invasion of the Caucasus and Central Asia. For the most part jihad did not create significant uprisings against the Allied powers. In fact, World War I began badly for the Ottomans: British troops seized Basra and began to advance up the Tigris river, Cemal Pasha's invasion of British Egypt failed, and Enver Pasha's Third Army was annihilated by the Russians in the Battle of Sarikamish. These defeats greatly depressed the committee and ended their pan-Turanist dreams. However, Allied attempts to force the Bosphorus in a naval breakthrough failed on 18 March, improving the confidence of the Unionists. On 18 March, the machinations for plans of a purge of Armenians from Ottoman politics and the economy and ethnic engineering in eastern Anatolia began which would culminate lethally on 24 April. The goal was to realise Türk Yurdu: the Turkification of Anatolia and transforming the Ottoman Empire into a homogeneous Turkish nation state.

=== Armenian genocide ===
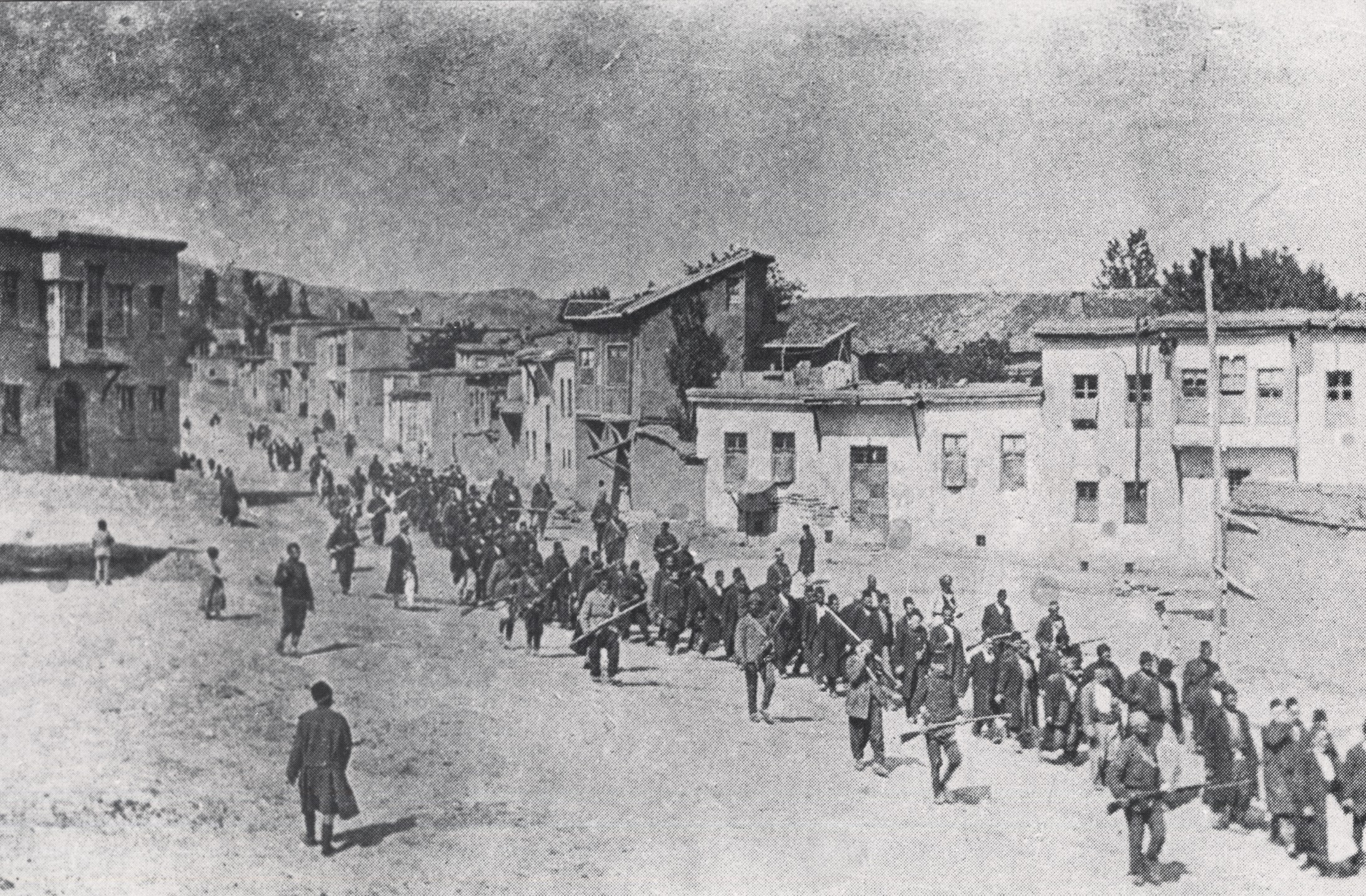
Armenians being marched to their execution

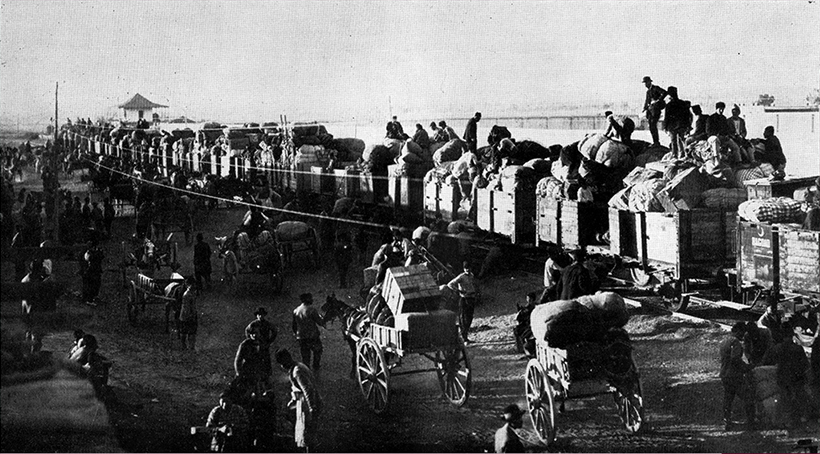
Adana Armenians being deported to Syria

After the failure of the Sarikamish expedition, the Ottoman Empire under the CUP was involved in ordering the deportations and massacres of about 1 million Armenians and other Christian groups between 1915 and 1918, known to history as the Armenian genocide or the Late Ottoman Genocides. Talât's position as the Interior Minister was key in organising the endeavour. The government would have liked to resume the "cleansing operations" against the Greek minority in western Anatolia, but this was vetoed under pressure from Germany, the Empire's only source of military equipment, as Germany wished for a neutral Greece in the war.

The Special Organisation played a key role in the Late Ottoman Genocides. The Special Organisation, which was made of especially fanatical Unionist cadres, was expanded from August 1914 onward. Talât gave orders that all of the prisoners convicted of the worse crimes such as murder, rape, robbery, etc. could have their freedom if they agreed to join the Special Organisation to kill Armenians and loot their property. Besides the hardened career criminals who joined in large numbers to have their freedom, the rank and file of Special Organisation killing units included Kurdish tribesmen attracted by the prospect of plunder and refugees from Rumelia, who were thirsting for the prospect of revenge against Christians after having been forced to flee from the Balkans in 1912.

In late 1914, Enver Pasha ordered that all Armenians serving in the Ottoman Army be disarmed and sent to labour battalions. The following year, he ordered the killing of all 200,000 Ottoman Armenian soldiers, who were now disarmed in the labour battalions.

On 24 April 1915, Talât sent a telegram to Cemal Pasha (who was governor of Syria) instructing him to deport rebellious Armenians not to Central Anatolia (Konya), as had been done to a previous group which rose up in Zeytun (modern Süleymanlı), but instead to the much more inhospitable deserts of northern Syria. The Syrian deserts ended up being the destination of future Armenian deportees. Talât sent a circular to the governors to carry out the arrests of important Dashnak and Hunchak members as well as "important and harmful Armenians known by the government." That night, many of Constantinople's prominent Armenian elites were rounded up, arrested, and killed soon after, including Vramian. Military, provincial, and Unionist commissaries were then dispatched to spread falsehoods about Armenians to feed into the spirit of jihad. In some cases the responsible secretaries of the committee levied Special Organization bands to put deportees to death. On 27 May, the legal basis for demographic engineering was enacted in the form of a provisional law that allowed for the government the powers of mass repression and deportation if national security was at risk (Tehcir Law).

Deported Armenians had their property confiscated by the state and redistributed to Muslims or simply snatched by local provincial authorities (such as Central Committee member Mehmet Reşid's governorship in Diyarbekir). Return of property to the deportees was de facto forbidden. By late 1916 most Armenians outside of cities like Constantinople and Izmir lost their private property.

In areas where Christian minorities were deported from, the government settled Balkan Muslim refugees to take their place and property. Some local governors stood up to the Central Committee's orders of deportations against Christians such as in Kütahya, İzmir, and Dersim (modern Tunceli), but most resistors were simply replaced by Talât. This program of redistribution of Armenian property, Millî İktisat (national economy), was a core tenet of the CUP's Türk Yurdu project.

The deportations, massacres, and confiscation of property that were performed against Armenians and other Christian groups were on a larger scale than ever, but this was not the first of such occurrences. Talât and the CUP hypocritically portrayed their actions in a Hamidian context; just like how Abdul Hamid's pretext for massacres against his own Armenian subjects was justified through legal means.

=== Relations with Jews and Zionists ===
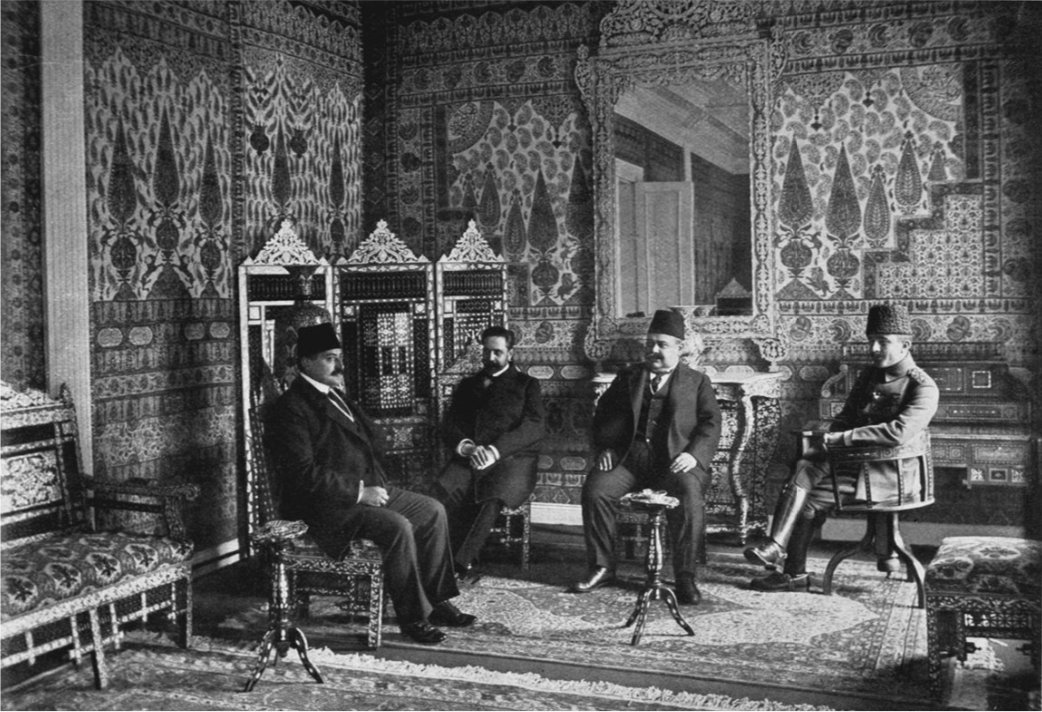
Talât with CUP leaders Halil Bey and Enver Pasha, and Zionist politician Naum Tyufekchiev, 1915

In December 1914, Cemal, encouraged by Şakir, ordered the deportation of all the Jews living in the southern part of Ottoman Syria known as the Mutasarrifate of Jerusalem (roughly what is now Israel) on grounds that most of the Jews came from the Russian Empire, but in reality because the CUP considered the Zionist movement as a threat to the Ottoman state. The deportation order was vetoed by Wangenheim and other members of the Central Committee; Germany's leaders believed that the Jews had vast secret powers, and if the Reich were to assist the Jews in the war, the Jews in their turn would assist the Reich. Within the Central Committee, many had personal Judeophilic sentiments. The CUP had its origins in Salonica, at the time the center of the Jewish world with a Jewish plurality. Some in the committee were even Dönmeh, that is, Muslims with Jewish ancestry, including Cavid and Dr. Nâzım, and most in the committee enjoyed cordial relations with contemporary Zionists. In general, most Jews were sympathetic with the Unionist regime, especially those concentrated in urban areas and those outside the empire, and sentiments of an Islamic-Jewish alliance were common. However, while the Jews of the Yishuv were not deported, the Ottoman authorities made sure to harass the Jews in various other ways, prompting the creation of the pro-entente NILI resistance network centered around Ottoman Palestine.

As the Allied armies started advancing into Palestine in March 1917, Cemal Pasha ordered the deportation of the Jews of Jaffa, and after the discovery of NILI headed by the agronomist Aaron Aaronsohn who spied for the British out of the fear that Unionists would inflict the same fate on Jews as they did upon Armenians, ordered the deportation of all the Jews. However, British victories over the Ottomans in the autumn of 1917 with Field Marshal Allenby taking Jerusalem on 9 December 1917 saved the Jews of Palestine from being deported.

=== Other ethnic groups ===
The Assyrian Christian community was also targeted by the Unionist government in what is now known as the Seyfo. Talât ordered the governor of Van to remove the Assyrian population in Hakkâri, leading to the deaths of hundreds of thousands, however this anti-Assyrian policy wasn't implemented nationally leading to inconsistent attacks on Assyrians

Even though many Kurdish tribes played an important role in the Special Organisation's exterminatory operations against Christian minorities, Kurds also found themselves victims of deportation of the government, though not of massacre. Talât outlined that nowhere in the Empire's vilayets should the Kurdish population be more than 5%. To that end, Balkan Muslim and Turkish refugees were prioritised to be resettled in Urfa, Maraş, and Antep, while some Kurds were to be deported to Central Anatolia. Kurds were supposed to be resettled in abandoned Armenian property, however negligence by resettlement authorities still resulted in the deaths of many Kurds by famine.

The CUP was against all groups which could potentially demand independence. Cemal Pasha's governance in the multicultural provinces of Greater Syria saw many groups, not just Armenians, be effected by Committee rule (See Seferberlik). During the war, Cemal Pasha famously hung local Syrian notables for treason, which helped facilitate the Arab Revolt against the empire. He also made more judicious use of the Tehcir law (compared to Talât) to selectively and temporarily deport certain Arab families he considered suspicious. Due to the Allied blockade of the region and a lack of supplies for the civilian population, certain parts of Ottoman Syria experienced desperate famine.

The deportations of the Rûm were put on hold as Germany wished for a Greek ally or neutrality, however for the sake of their alliance, German reaction to the deportations of Armenians was muted. The participation of the Ottoman Empire as an ally against the Entente powers was crucial to German grand strategy in the war, and good relations were needed. Following Russian breakthrough in the Caucasus and signs that Greece would side with the Allied powers after all, the CUP was finally able to resume operations against the Greeks of the empire, and Talât ordered the deportation of the Pontus Greeks of the Black Sea coast. Acts of plunder by the Special Organisation and regional authorities occurred in the region around Trabzon, with Topal Osman being an especially infamous figure.

=== From victory to defeat ===
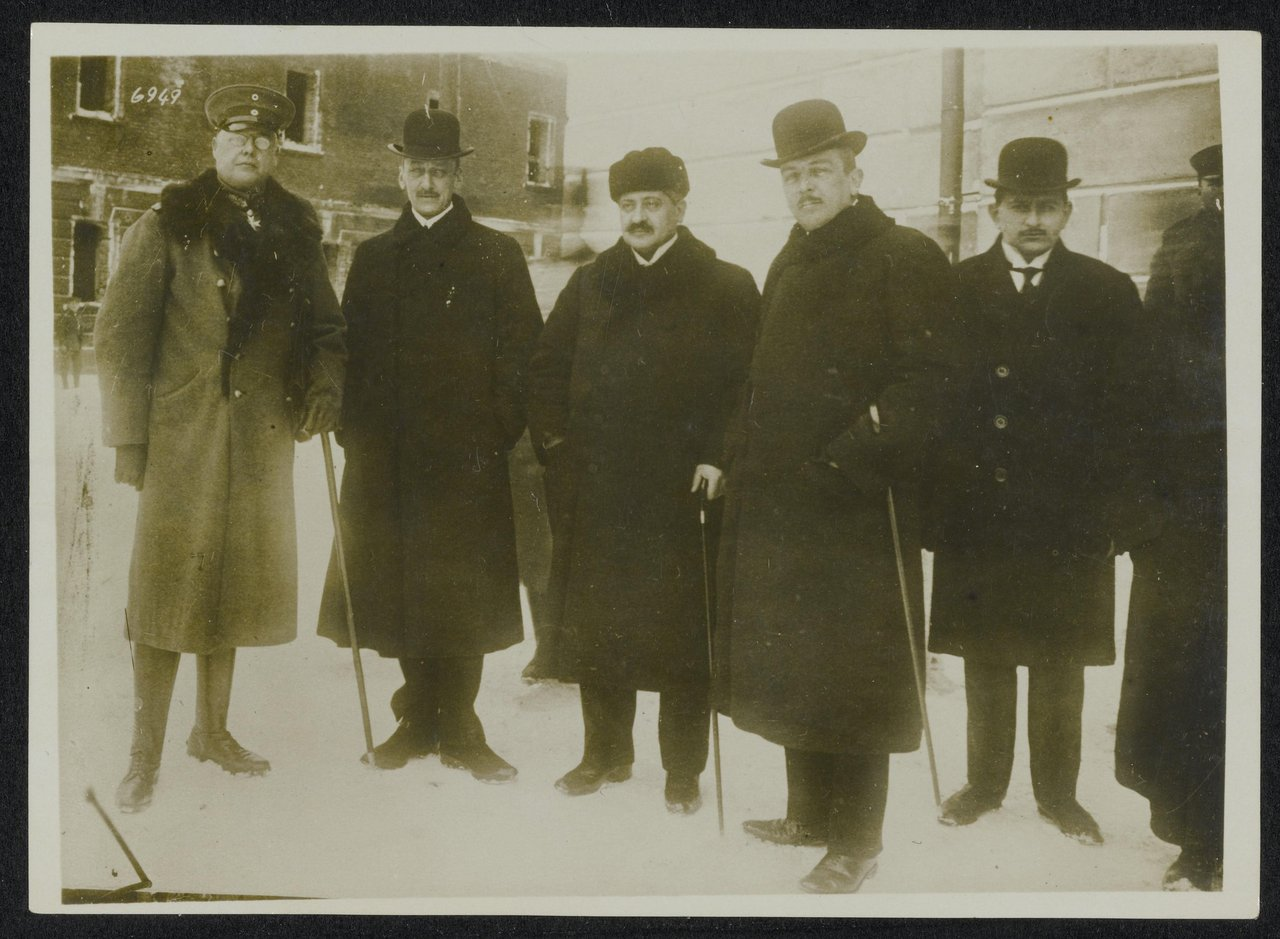
Central Powers' delegation to Brest Litovsk; from left to right: General Max Hoffman (Germany), Ottakar Czernin (Austrian Minister of Foreign Affairs), Grand Vizier Talât Pasha, and Richard von Kühlmann (German Minister of Foreign Affairs)

On 24 May 1915, after learning of the "Great Crime", the British, French and Russian governments issued a joint statement accusing the Ottoman government of "crimes against humanity", the first time in history that this term had been used. The British, French and Russians further promised that once the war was won they would put the Ottoman leaders responsible for the Armenian genocide on trial for crimes against humanity. However, with Allied forces being bogged down in both the Gallipoli, Palestinian and Mesopotamian fronts, the CUP's leaders were not threatened by the Allied threat to bring them to trial. On 22–23 November 1915, General Sir Charles Townshend was defeated in the Battle of Ctesiphon by Nureddin Pasha and Goltz Pasha, ending the British advance on Baghdad. On 3 December 1915, what was left of Townshend's force was besieged in Kut al-Amara (his forces surrendered to Halil Pasha five months later).

In January 1916, Gallipoli ended in an Ottoman victory with the withdrawal of the Allied forces; this victory did much to boost the prestige of the CUP regime. During World War I, while the alliance between the Ottoman Empire and Germany was crucial to the goals of both empires, it stood constantly on tense ground. Both the Unionists and the Wilhelminian elites of Germany shared chauvinistic attitudes against Anglo-Saxon values of democracy and pluralism, as well as more general Anglophobic and Russophobic sentiments. However, the enactment of the Türk Yurdu project through the deportation and extermination of Christian minorities deeply disturbed politicians back in Berlin (though not so much the German military elites).

On 4 February 1917, Said Halim was finally outmaneuvered from his premiership, and Talât was appointed Grand Vizier, bringing the radical faction of the CUP directly to power, though Said Halim was always a puppet of the Central Committee. When it came to policy, the Union and Progress regime introduced many reforms which peaked in Talât Pasha's administration. Reforms in women's rights and matrimony law and education were undertaken, that set the groundwork for the more extensive reforms of Mustafa Kemal Atatürk's regime. When it came to the military, though the withdrawal of Russia from the war and the Treaty of Brest-Litovsk, negotiated and signed by Talât Pasha, was not only a massive success for the CUP but also for the Ottoman-German alliance, it simply delayed conflict. The Ottoman Empire regained the Caucasian provinces (Batumi, Kars, Ardahan) lost in the war against Russia forty years ago, but nothing was guaranteed for the CUP's Turanist ambitions in the Caucasus and Central Asia.

The Committee decided to take matters into their own hands. Enver Pasha established the Army of Islam to conquer Baku and its oil fields and potentially fulfill Pan-Turkist dreams in Central Asia. German officers were deliberately excluded from the army group, as the Ottomans were suspicious (correctly) of similar German intentions to occupy Baku. This tension reached a boiling point in the spring of 1918, in an incident where Ottoman and German forces clashed in the area. The Ottomans won the race to Baku when the Army of Islam arrived in September, but by then the Central Powers were losing on all fronts. Both countries capitulated to the Allied powers before relations could deteriorate any further.

== Purges and disintegration (1918–1926) ==
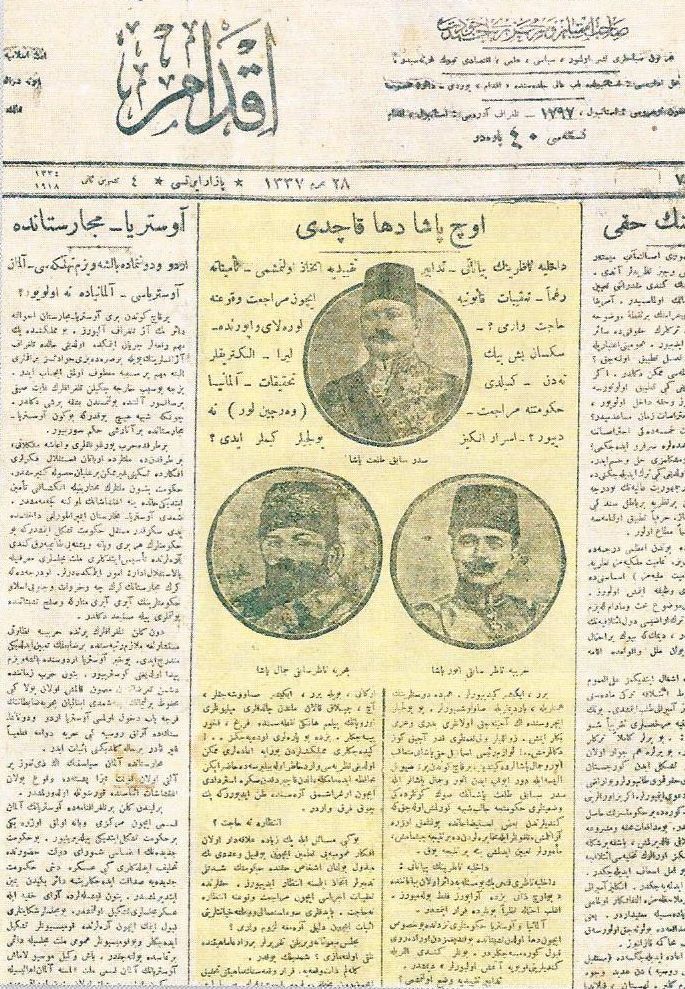
The front page of the Ottoman newspaper İkdam on 4 November 1918 after the Three Pashas fled the country following World War I. Showing left to right: Cemal Pasha, Talât Pasha, and Enver Pasha.

As the military position of the Central Powers disintegrated, on 13 October 1918 Talât Pasha's government resigned. On October 30 Marshal Ahmet İzzet Pasha, as the new Grand Vizier, negotiated the Armistice of Mudros. The position of the CUP was now untenable, and its top leaders fled to Sevastopol and scattered from there. During the party's last congress held on 1–5 November 1918, the remaining party members decided to abolish the party, which was severely criticised by the public because of the Empire's defeat. However just a week later the Renewal Party was created, with most Unionist assets and infrastructure being transferred over to the new party, which proceeded the Ottoman Liberal People's Party's formation of liberal Unionists. They were both banned by the Ottoman government in 1919. Ottoman officials began a purge of the Unionists from the government and army. The Allies continued advancing into Ottoman territory and occupying land, breaking armistice terms. Allied forces occupied Constantinople and various points throughout the Empire, and through their High Commissioner Somerset Calthorpe Britain demanded that those members of the CUP leadership who had not fled be put on trial, a policy also demanded by Part VII of the Treaty of Sèvres formally ending hostilities between the Allies and the Empire. The British arrested 60 high ranking Unionists thought to be responsible for atrocities and sent them to Malta, (see Malta exiles), where trials were planned. The new government in the Ottoman Empire, led by Damat Ferid Pasha and Mehmed VI Vahdettin as Sultan, obligingly arrested over 100 Unionist party and military officials by April 1919 and began a series of trials. The effectiveness of these trials was initially promising, with one district governor, Mehmed Kemal, being hanged on April 10. Two additional Unionists were convicted of crimes against humanity and were hanged, but while a few others were convicted, none completed their prison terms. Talât, Enver, Cemal, and Doctor Nazım to death in absentia for violating the constitution, war crimes, and corruption.

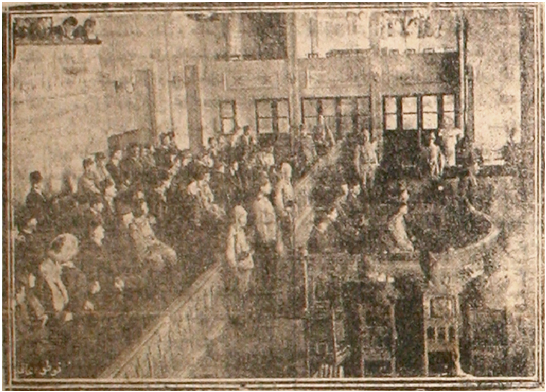
Unionists on trial in the Istanbul military tribunals

Much of the Unionist leadership that fled from justice was assassinated between 1920 and 1922 in Operation Nemesis. The Dashnaks sent out assassins to hunt down and assassinate the Unionists responsible for the Armenian genocide. Minister of the Interior and later Grand Vizier Talât Pasha was gunned down in Berlin by a Dashnak on 15 March 1921. Said Halim Pasha, Talât's predecessor who signed the deportation orders in 1915 was assassinated in Rome by a Dashnak on 5 December 1921. The commander of the Special Organisation Bahattin Şakir was assassinated in Berlin on 17 April 1922 by a Dashnak gunman. Cemal Pasha was assassinated on 21 July 1922 in Tbilisi by Dashnaks. The final member of the leadership, Enver Pasha was killed in Central Asia while leading the Basmachi Revolt against the Bolsheviks, the Bolshevik force under the command of an ethnic Armenian.

Though most Unionists chose to rally around Mustafa Kemal and his Turkish national movement against the government in Constantinople and renew war against the Allies in the Turkish War of Independence, some Unionists were dissatisfied, and Kara Kemal briefly revived the CUP in January 1922. Unionist journalist Hüseyin Cahit declared Union and Progress would not contest the 1923 general election for the Ankara based parliament against Atatürk's People's Party. However, dissatisfied with the secularist policies the Republicans were pushing through, such as the abolition of the Caliphate, Kara Kemal's CUP supported the creation of the Progressive Republican Party, which splintered from the People's Party (which renamed itself to the Republican People's Party). The Progressive Republican Party and the remaining nonconforming Unionists were purged for good following the İzmir Affair, an alleged assassination attempt against Mustafa Kemal. Dr. Nâzım, Mehmed Cavid, and İsmail Canbulat met their ends in the subsequent Independence Tribunals with Kara Kemal committing suicide before his execution. With opposition quashed, Atatürk consolidated his power and continued ruling Turkey until his death in 1938.

== Ideology ==
The ideology of the Committee of Union and Progress, known as İttihadism (ittihadcılık), was neither static nor internally consistent, evolving considerably between the organisation's founding in 1889 and its dissolution in 1918. Its core commitment throughout was to the centralisation and modernisation of the Ottoman state under Turkish dominance.

The CUP began as a constitutionalist and progressive movement, united by the conviction that the restoration of the Ottoman constitution was essential to halt the empire's decline. Early figures such as Ahmet Rıza were committed positivists shaped by Auguste Comte, who believed that rational, scientific governance would modernise the empire. The committee's continued reliance on komitecilik, however, drew persistent accusations of authoritarianism from genuine democrats, and its constitutionalist commitments weakened considerably after the 1913 coup.

Prior to the Balkan Wars the CUP nominally subscribed to Ottomanism, the project of forging a shared civic identity across ethnic and religious lines, though in practice this was inflected with an expectation of Turkish dominance. The loss of most of the empire's European territory in the First Balkan War and the expulsion of Muslim populations from Rumelia accelerated a pivot toward an exclusionary Turkish nationalism. Pan-Turkism was formally incorporated into the party programme at the 1909 Salonica congress, and the committee's chief ideologue Ziya Gökalp provided its intellectual framework, articulating a vision of a pan-Turanian ethnic and cultural union binding Turkdom to Muslim identity. After 1913 the committee openly abandoned Ottomanism in favour of the ethnic and religious homogenisation of Anatolia.

Pan-Islamism was deployed instrumentally by the CUP; Princeton University professor of late Ottoman history M. Şükrü Hanioğlu has noted that the committee appealed to Islam whenever it was convenient.Hanioğlu 2008, p. 187Worringer 2014, pp. 41, 53, 69, 81–82, 188, 224–27, 260–61 From 1914, with Ottoman entry into World War I, this intensified, and the declaration of jihad issued that November blended Islamic rhetoric with Turkish nationalist messaging to justify the deportation of Christian minorities.

Social Darwinism was a significant ideological underpinning of the CUP, particularly among the military-doctor éminences grises Bahattin Şakir and Dr. Nâzım, who framed the competition between nations as a deadly struggle for survival. The subscription of CUP leaders to Social Darwinism convinced them that the construction of the Turkish nation would be realised through the elimination of the Armenians, providing the ideological basis for the anti-Armenian policies pursued from 1915 onwards. From 1915 the CUP also pursued Millî İktisat (national economy), a statist programme that confiscated Armenian and Greek property and redistributed it to Muslim settlers, with the aim of constructing a homogeneous Turkish-Muslim economic class in Anatolia.

== Publications and media ==
The Committee of Union and Progress maintained an extensive network of publications throughout its existence, used variously for ideological dissemination, political organising, and propaganda.

The committee's primary organ was Meşveret, founded by Ahmet Rıza in Paris in 1895 and published in both Ottoman Turkish and French. It called for the restoration of the constitution and served as the mouthpiece of the Unionist exile community in Europe. Şûrâ-yı Ümmet, a magazine controlled by Bahattin Şakir, served as another major organ of the committee during the émigré period. Following the Young Turk Revolution of 1908, Tanin became the committee's principal newspaper inside the Ottoman Empire, functioning as its semi-official voice throughout the Second Constitutional Era.

Among the broader Young Turk press associated with the committee, Türk promoted early Turkist ideas, while Genç Kalemler was an influential literary and nationalist journal associated with the movement's cultural turn toward Turkism in the early 1910s. During the émigré period, Kanun-i Esasi was published in Egypt and circulated among Young Turk communities abroad, and Mizan, the organ of the rival Mehmed Murad Bey, competed with Meşveret for influence among exiled Unionists before Murad's reconciliation with the palace. The religious journal İslam Mecmuası also had close ties to the committee, reflecting the pan-Islamist strand of Unionist thought.

== Legacy ==
=== Turkey ===
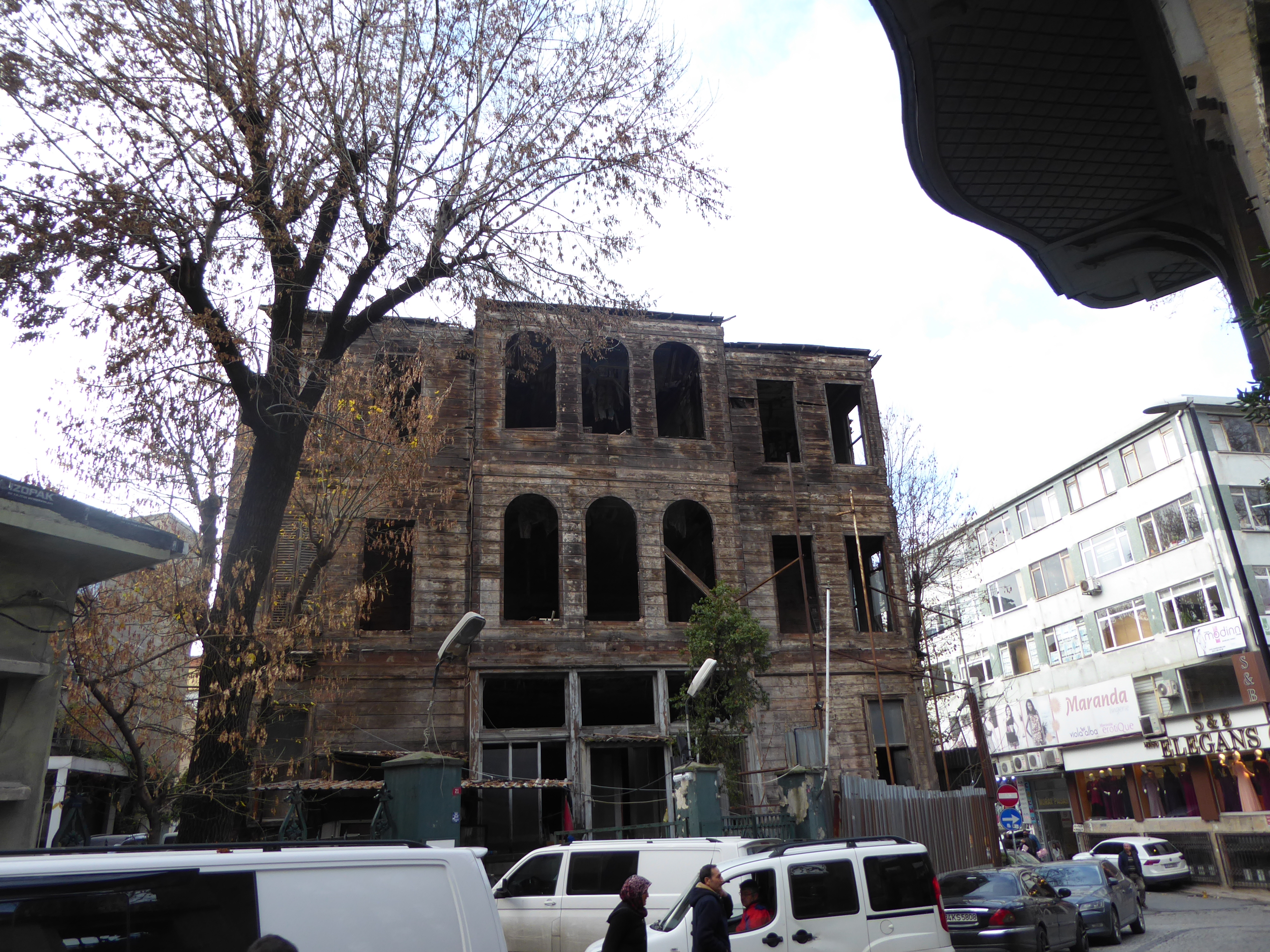
The Pembe Konak, the building where the CUP's Istanbul headquarters was located

Most leaders of the Turkish National Movement and to that extent, individuals associated with Atatürk's Republican People's Party (CHP) (which continued one-party-rule) were former Unionists. Presidents of the Republic of Turkey Mustafa Kemal Atatürk, İsmet İnönü, and Celal Bayar, were members of Union and Progress. CUP Central Committee members Ziya Gökalp, Halil Menteşe, Midhat Şükrü Bleda, Fethi Okyar, and Rahmi Arslan managed to integrate themselves within the new post-Ottoman regime. Other important Republican Turkish figures formerly associated with the CUP included Rauf Orbay, Kâzım Karabekir, Adnan Adıvar, Şükrü Kaya, Çerkez Ethem, Bekir Sami, Yusuf Kemal, Celaleddin Arif, Ahmet Ağaoğlu, Recep Peker, Şemsettin Günaltay, Hüseyin Avni, Mehmet Emin Yurdakul, Mehmet Akif Ersoy, Celal Nuri İleri, Ali Münif Yeğenağa, Yunus Nadi Abalıoğlu, Falih Rıfkı Atay, and others. When Bülent Ecevit became leader of CHP in 1972, he was first general secretary of the party not previously affiliated with the CUP (and born in the Republic of Turkey). His leadership transformed the party into a social democratic force in Turkish politics, which the party stays faithful to, to this day.

Most historians from Turkey write of the period Union and Progress was in power using the lens of Kemalist historiography, which asserts that the Ottoman Empire and the Republic of Turkey are two distinct countries, and that the Committee of Union and Progress and the Republican People's Party feature no relation to each other. However, due to the commonalities of various personnel and governing ideologies, opponents of Kemalist Historiography assert that a continuity does exist between the Unionists which took power in the 1913 coup d'état and the Republicans which lost power in Turkey's first multi-party election in 1950; therefore Turkey, as both a constitutional monarchy and as a republic, was in a state of continuous one-party dictatorship between those years.

In addition to Atatürk's CHP, Union and Progress also has at times been identified with the two opposition parties that Atatürk attempted to introduce into Turkish politics against his own party in order to help jump-start multiparty democracy in Turkey, namely the Progressive Republican Party and the Liberal Republican Party. While neither of these parties was primarily made up of persons indicted for genocidal activities, they were eventually taken over (or at least exploited) by persons who wished to restore the Ottoman caliphate. Consequently, both parties were required to be outlawed, although Kazim Karabekir, founder of the PRP, was eventually rehabilitated after the death of Atatürk by İnönü and even served as speaker of the Grand National Assembly of Turkey.

It was Karabekir who crystallised the modern Turkish position on the Armenian genocide, telling Soviet peace commissioners that the return of any Armenians to territory controlled by Turks was out of the question, as the Armenians had perished in a rebellion of their own making. Historian Taner Akçam has identified four definitions of Turkey which have been handed down by the first Republican generation to modern Turks, of which the second is "Turkey is a society without ethnic minorities or cultures."

=== Outside Turkey ===
The Young Turk Revolution and CUP's work had a great impact on Muslims in other countries. The Persian community in Istanbul founded the Iranian Union and Progress Party. Indian Muslims imitated the CUP oath administered to recruits of the organisation. The leaders of the Young Bukharans were deeply influenced by the Young Turk Revolution and saw it as an example to emulate. Jadidists sought to emulate the Young Turks. After the Young Turk Revolution, reformist elements in the Greek military formed a secret revolutionary organisation modeled from the CUP which overthrew the government in the Goudi Coup, bringing Eleftherios Venizelos to power.

In 1988, Soviet authorities dismanteled an organisation in Zhambyl called Union and Progress which planned to carry out assassinations of Communist Party leaders in the Kazakh SSR.

Considered the world's first one-party state, the CUP regime set an example for future one party regimes, especially in interwar Europe.

== Election results ==
=== Chamber of Deputies elections ===
Election	Seats	Position	Reference
1908	147 / 288	Government	
1912	269 / 275	Government	
1914	192 / 275	Government	

== Congresses ==
In exile:

- 1896
- 1902: First Congress of the Young Turks
- 1907: Second Congress of the Young Turks

Secret:

- 1908
- 1909
- 1910
- 1911

Public:

- 1912
- 1913
- 1916
- 1917
- 1918

== See also ==
- Tanin (newspaper)
- Union Club
- Progres FC
- National Bank of Turkey
- Persecution of Muslims during Ottoman contraction
- Persecution of Christians in the later Ottoman Empire
- List of Ottoman grand viziers of the Second Constitutional Era
- List of political parties in the Ottoman Empire
- Relationship between Enver Pasha and Mustafa Kemal Atatürk
