= National Defense League (Ottoman Empire) =

Ottoman political organization

The National Defense League (Müdâfaa-i Milliye Cemiyeti) was an organization in the Ottoman Empire that operated as a front for the ruling Committee of Union and Progress (CUP) during the Second Constitutional Era. One of its functions was collecting the CUP's share of the property that was confiscated from Armenians killed during the Armenian genocide.
