= Ottoman Freedom Society =

The Ottoman Freedom Society (Turkish: Osmanlı Hürriyet Cemiyeti) a political society founded in 1906 by Mehmed Talat Bey in Thessaloniki.

== Founding of the Ottoman Liberty Society ==
In September 1906, the Ottoman Liberty Society was founded in Thessaloniki at the house of Mithat Şükrü (Bleda) Bey. The initial meeting led to the third Congress where the founding members, primarily army officers, convened. The founders included Bursalı Tahir, Naki (Yücekök), Edip Servet (Tör), Kazım Nami (Duru), Mithat Şükrü (Bleda), Ömer Naci, İsmail Canbulat, Hakkı Baha, Mehmed Talat Bey, and Rahmi (Arslan) Bey.

== Expansion and Structure ==
The society's structure was secretive, adopting a cell-type format. Members were inducted in a clandestine ceremony involving an oath with significant emphasis on confidentiality. The structure included a 'Supreme Council' with key figures like İsmail Canbolat, Talat Bey, and Rahmi Bey. The organization distinguished itself by spreading among both military and civilian statesmen, primarily based in Thessaloniki.
