= Macedonia Risorta =

Masonic lodge in Salonica, Ottoman Empire

Macedonia Risorta was an important Masonic lodge of the Italian Obedience that existed between the end of the 19th century and the beginning of the 20th century around the city of Salonica. From its inception this lodge was strongly associated with the liberal nationalist movement of the Young Turks, and would later serve as a headquarters for the Committee of Union and Progress.

== History ==
The lodge was founded in 1864 in Salonica under the name of "Macedonia", being one of the firsts Masonic lodges in the Ottoman Empire. Like the other Masonic lodges of its time, Macedonia was viewed with suspicion and mistrust by the authorities, which led to it being persecuted. In 1895 the lodge was refounded by Emmanuel Carasso under the name of Macedonia Risorta (Macedonia Resurrected), he also being its president. During Carasso's presidency the lodge provided a solid, reliable and secret haven for the revolutionary activities of the Young Turks. Some important figures of Macedonia Risorta include Mehmed Talaat Bey, who joined in 1903, Mithad Şükrü Bey, Mustafa Rahmi Bey, Yomer Naji Bey, Naki Bey, Refik Bey Manyasizadeh or Ismail Janbolat Bey.
