= Ahmet Erner =

Ottoman Turkish politician and diplomat

Ahmet Faik Erner (1880–1967) was an Ottoman Turkish bureaucrat and a member of the Committee for Union and Progress (CUP).

== Early life and education ==
He attended the Ottoman Military College together with Mustafa Kemal Atatürk, successfully graduating from there in 1905. As a military officer he was deployed to serve in Yanya, (present-day Greece) where he was accepted as a member of the CUP. He took part in the suppression of a religiously motivated revolt against the Ottoman Government in spring 1909 in support of the CUP, following which he became the head of the Yildiz Police School. Due to his staunch support for the policies envisaged by the CUP, his relationship with CUP leader Talaat Pasha grew confidential and he was assigned the post of Gendarme Commander in the Province of Basra 1910.

== As an Ottoman bureaucrat ==
With the support of another member of the Ottoman Triumvirate, Djemal Pasha, he was assigned to the post of the Commander of the Gendarmerie Regiment of Baghdad. The Ottoman Government was satisfied with his service and in October 1914, he was given the post of the assistant Governor of the Baghdad Vilayet from where he was transferred to the Governorship of Aintab (present-day Gaziantep) in August 1915. In Aintab, he was put in charge of the deportations of the Christian Orthodox Armenian population. On the orders of Talaat Pasha, he facilitated their deportation and also expanded the deportations to the Catholics and Protestants. In 1915 and 1916, he facilitated their deportations in a more efficient way and deployed labor battalions to the construction of the Baghdad - Railway in Rajo. It was also during his tenure as Governor of Aintab that the final destination of the deportations became the eastern, Dear Ez Zoor and not as before, Hawran in the south of Damascus. He was one of the main and also strictest organizers of the deportations, an adherent to the idea of a complete removal of the Armenian population from Aintab. This caused him to file a report against the member of the Ottoman Parliament and CUP chief of Aintab Ali Cenani, who despite being also in favor of the deportations, at times also made exceptions for Armenian notables. Following the culmination of the deportations to the satisfaction of the Ottoman Government, he was appointed the director general of the police corps of Istanbul in May 1916, a post he held until 1918. After the defeat of the Ottoman Empire in World War I, he was arrested by the Turkish authorities for his involvement in the Armenian Genocide. He was deported to Malta in June 1919 as one of the so-called Malta Exiles by the British, where he was given the prisoner number 2724. He managed to flee Malta in 1921 together with other CUP bureaucrats like Şükrü Bey (Kaya). Over Rome he travelled on to Berlin, where he joined Talaat Pasha.

== Later life ==
In 1922, he and his family settled in Samsun, where he was involved in the trade of tobacco. Following the liberation of Turkey in 1923, he moved to Istanbul, where for a short while he endured financial hardships, as his businesses did not succeed. In 1930, he moved to Buenos Aires, Argentina, where he attempted anew an entrance into the tobacco trade. He also served as the honorary consul of Turkey to Argentina in Buenos Aires. Following some encounters with the local Armenian community and the fact that his tobacco business again did not succeed he decided to return to Turkey. Upon his arrival in Turkey, his former classmate Mustafa Kemal (at the time President of Turkey), learned of his situation and made arrangements for his regular retirement. In 1940, he received a leading position at a Turkish weapons factory of Škoda. He lived for several years on Büyükada island and died in 1967.

== Personal life ==
He was married to the niece of Ahmed Cevad Pasha, a Grand Vizier of the Ottoman Empire, and had two children. His children were Ambassador Erdem Erner and Nermidil Erner Binark.

== Works ==
- Polis rehberi (in Turkish)
