= Three Pashas =

De facto rulers of the Ottoman Empire during the First World War (1914–18)

The Three Pashas
اوچ پاشالر
(Üç Paşalar)

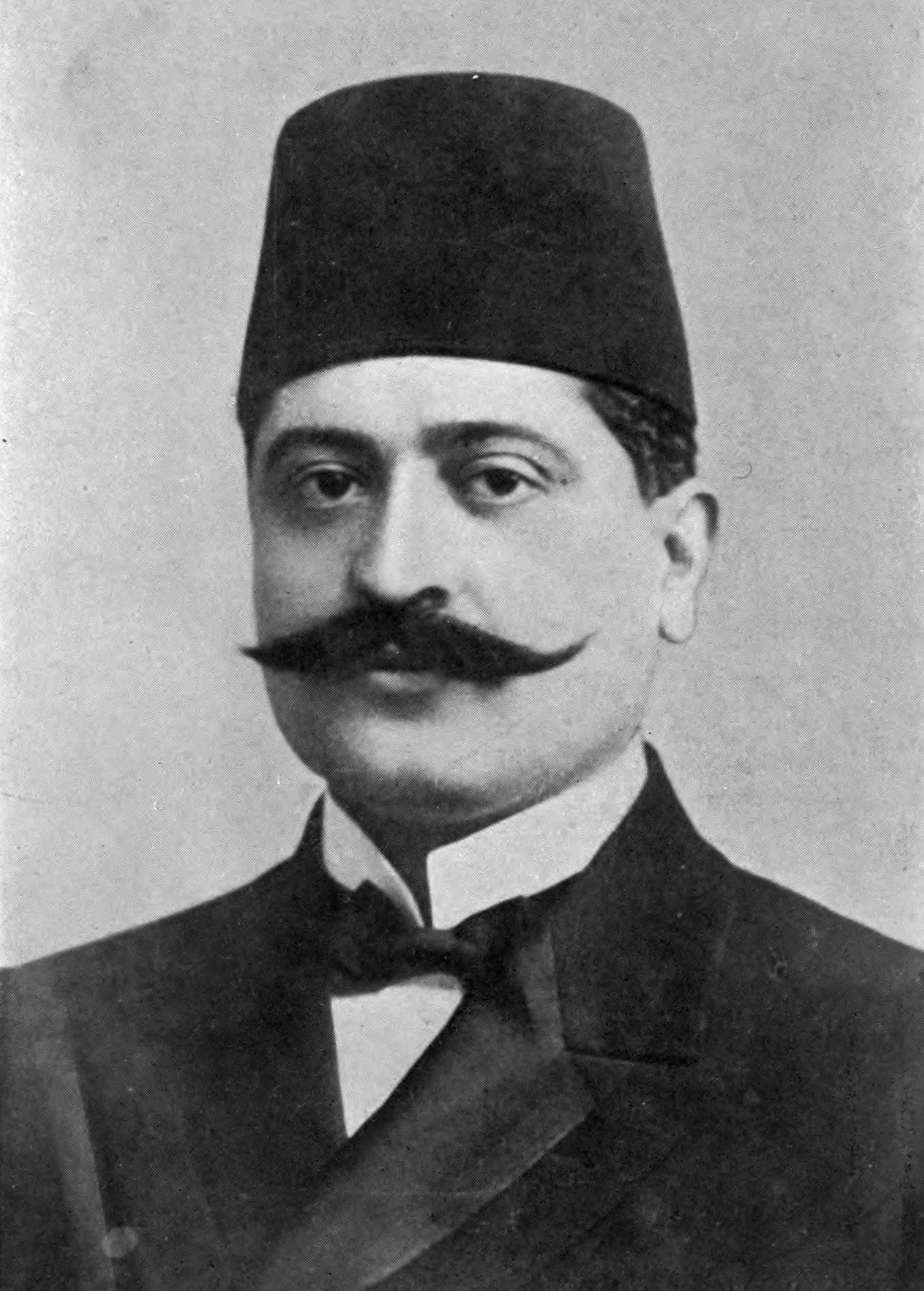
Talaat Pasha

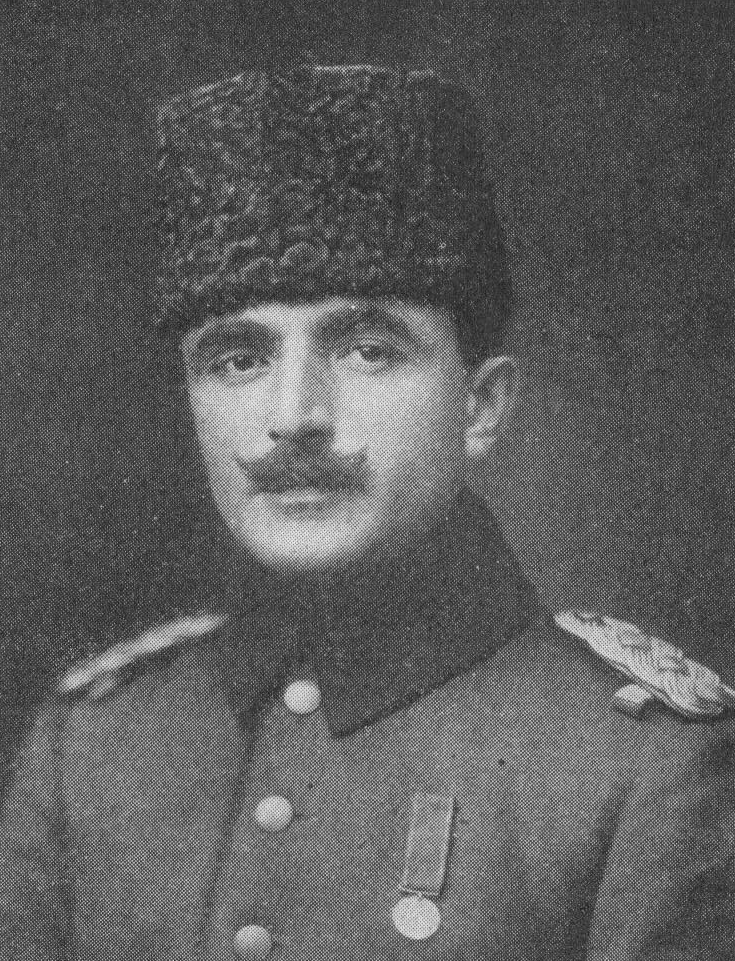
Enver Pasha

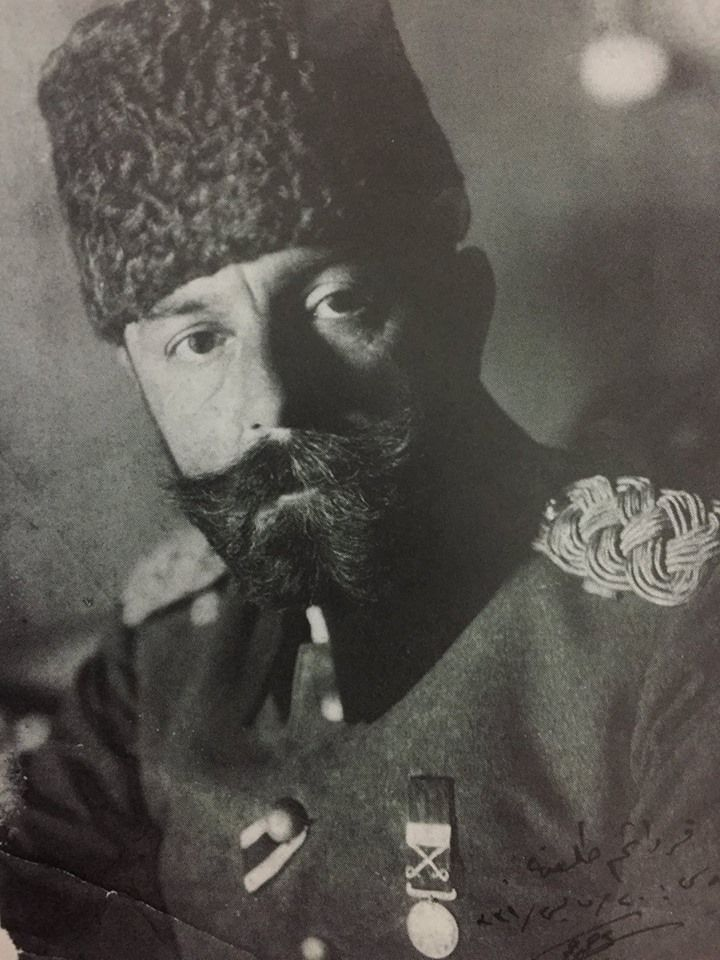
Djemal Pasha

The Three Pashas (Ottoman Turkish: اوچ پاشالر, Turkish: Üç Paşalar), also known as the Young Turk triumvirate or CUP triumvirate, were the dominant political and military figures who effectively ruled the Ottoman Empire after the 1913 Ottoman coup d'état and the subsequent assassination of Mahmud Shevket Pasha. The triumvirate consisted of Mehmed Talaat Pasha, (Note: Talaat previously had the title "Bey," and so was known as "Talaat Bey" until he gained the title "Pasha" in 1917.) the Grand Vizier (prime minister) and Minister of the Interior; Ismail Enver Pasha, the Minister of War and Commander-in-Chief to the Sultan; and Ahmed Djemal Pasha, the Minister of the Navy and governor-general of Syria.

The Three Pashas were all members of the Central Committee of the Committee of Union and Progress, a political movement that had begun with reformist ideals but by the 1910s had become an autocratic and nationalist ruling faction. The trio were largely responsible for the Empire's entry into World War I in 1914 on the side of the Central Powers and also largely responsible for the genocide of some one million Armenians. The Turkish public has widely criticized the Three Pashas for drawing the Ottoman Empire into World War I and its subsequent defeat. All three met violent deaths after the war—Talaat and Cemal were assassinated by the Armenian Revolutionary Federation as part of Operation Nemesis, whilst Enver died leading the Basmachi Revolt near Dushanbe, present-day Tajikistan.

After their deaths, Talaat and Enver's remains have been reburied at the Monument of Liberty in Istanbul and many of Turkey's streets have been controversially renamed in their honour.

== Historiography ==
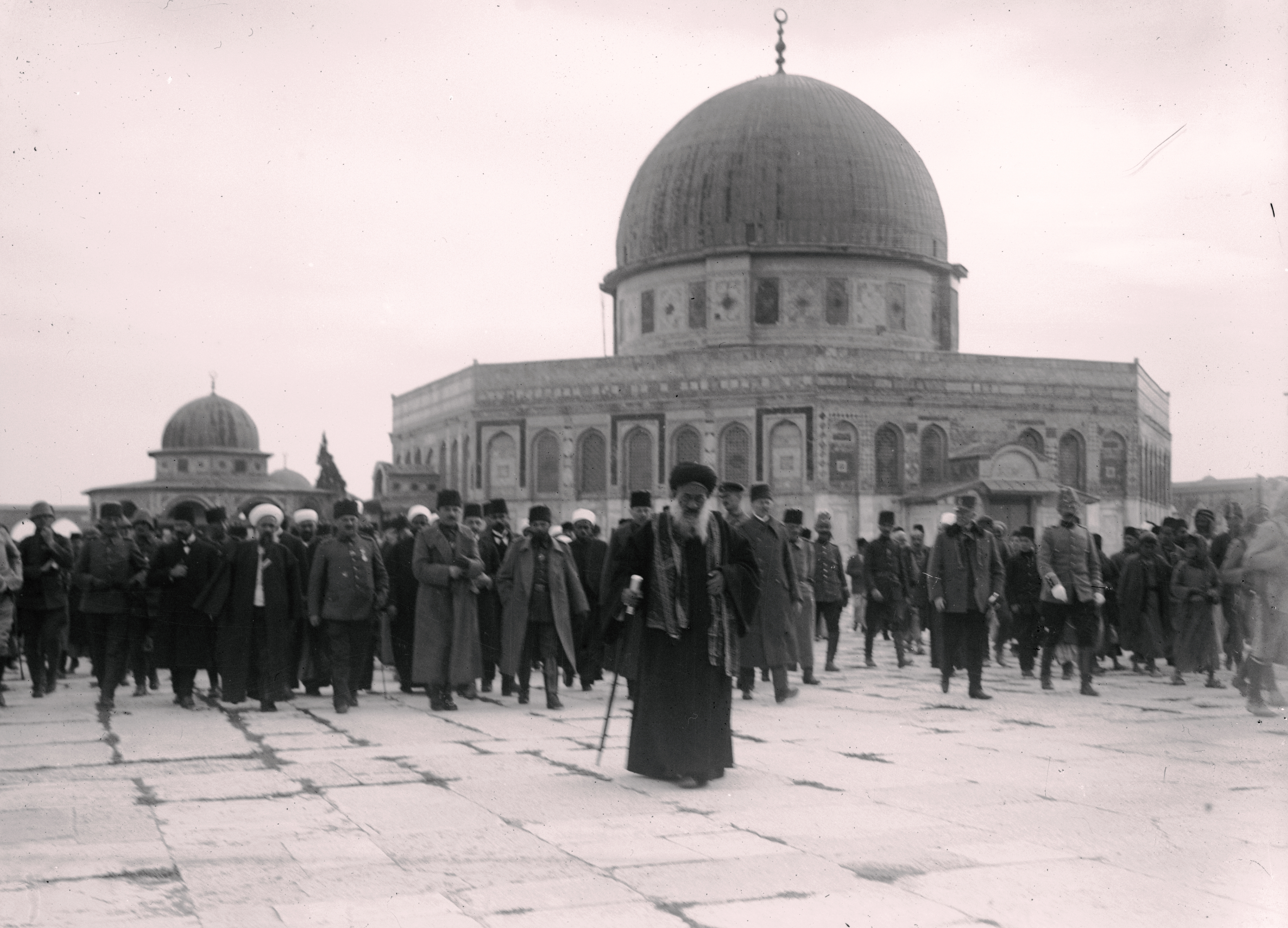
Enver Pasha and Djemal Pasha visiting the Dome of the Rock in Jerusalem during the First World War.

While the triumvirate consisted of Talaat, Enver, and Cemal, some say Halil Bey was a fourth member of this clique. Historian Hans-Lukas Kieser asserts that this state of rule by the Three Pashas is only accurate for the year 1913–1914, and that Talat Pasha would increasingly become a more central figure within the Union and Progress party state, especially once he also became Grand Vizier in 1917. Erik-Jan Zürcher and Taner Akçam claims that two factions dominated the Ottoman Empire during the Great War, a military camp led by Enver and the party/civilian camp led by Talaat. Alternatively, it would also be accurate to call the Unionist regime a clique or even an oligarchy, as many prominent Unionists held some form of de jure or de facto power. Other than the Three Pashas and Halil Bey, personalities such as Dr. Nazım, Bahaeddin Şakir, Mehmed Reşid, Ziya Gökalp, and the party's secretary general Midhat Şükrü also dominated the Central Committee without formal positions in the Ottoman government.

== Legacy ==
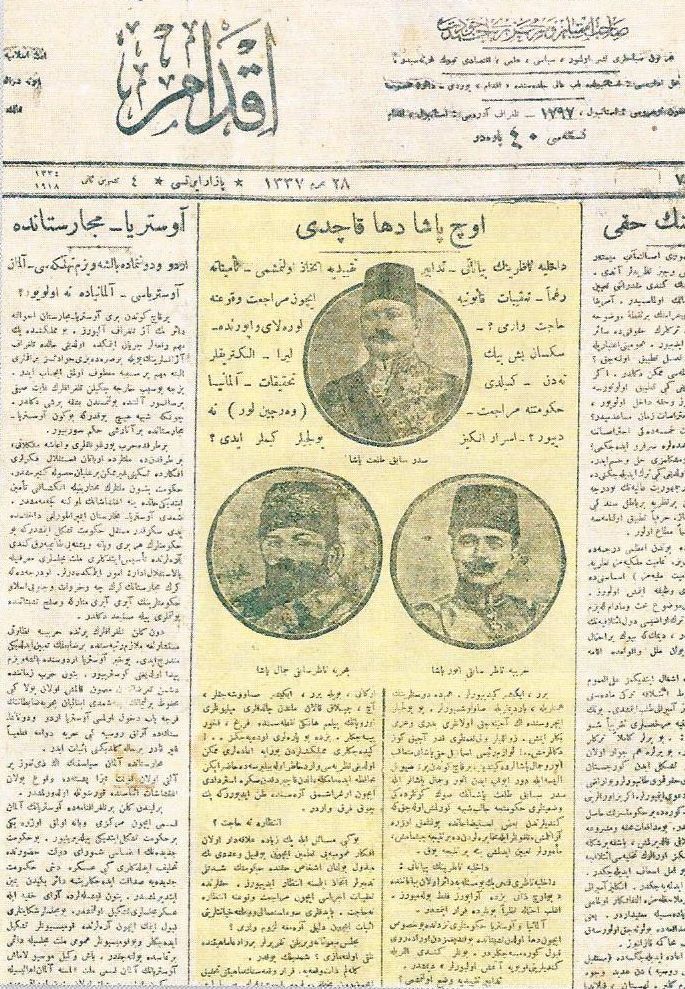
The front page of the Ottoman newspaper İkdam on 4 November 1918 after the Three Pashas fled the country following World War I. Showing left to right Cemal Pasha; Talaat Pasha; Enver Pasha

Western scholars hold that after the 1913 Ottoman coup d'état, these three men became the de facto rulers of the Ottoman Empire until its dissolution following World War I. They were members of the Committee of Union and Progress, a progressive organisation that they eventually came to control and transform into a primarily Pan-Turkist political party.

The Three Pashas were the principal players in the Ottoman–German Alliance and the Ottoman Empire's entry into World War I on the side of the Central Powers. One of the three, Ahmed Djemal, was opposed to an alliance with Germany, and French and Russian diplomacy attempted to keep the Ottoman Empire out of the war; but Germany was agitating for a commitment. Finally, on 29 October, the point of no return was reached when Admiral Wilhelm Souchon took SMS Goeben, SMS Breslau, and a squadron of Ottoman warships into the Black Sea (see pursuit of Goeben and Breslau) and raided the Russian ports of Odessa, Sevastopol, and Theodosia. It was claimed that Ahmed Cemal agreed in early October 1914 to authorize Souchon to launch a pre-emptive strike.

Ismail Enver had only once taken control of any military activity (Battle of Sarıkamış), and left the Third Army in ruins. The First Suez Offensive and the Arab Revolt are Ahmed Cemal's most significant failures.

=== Involvement in the Armenian genocide ===
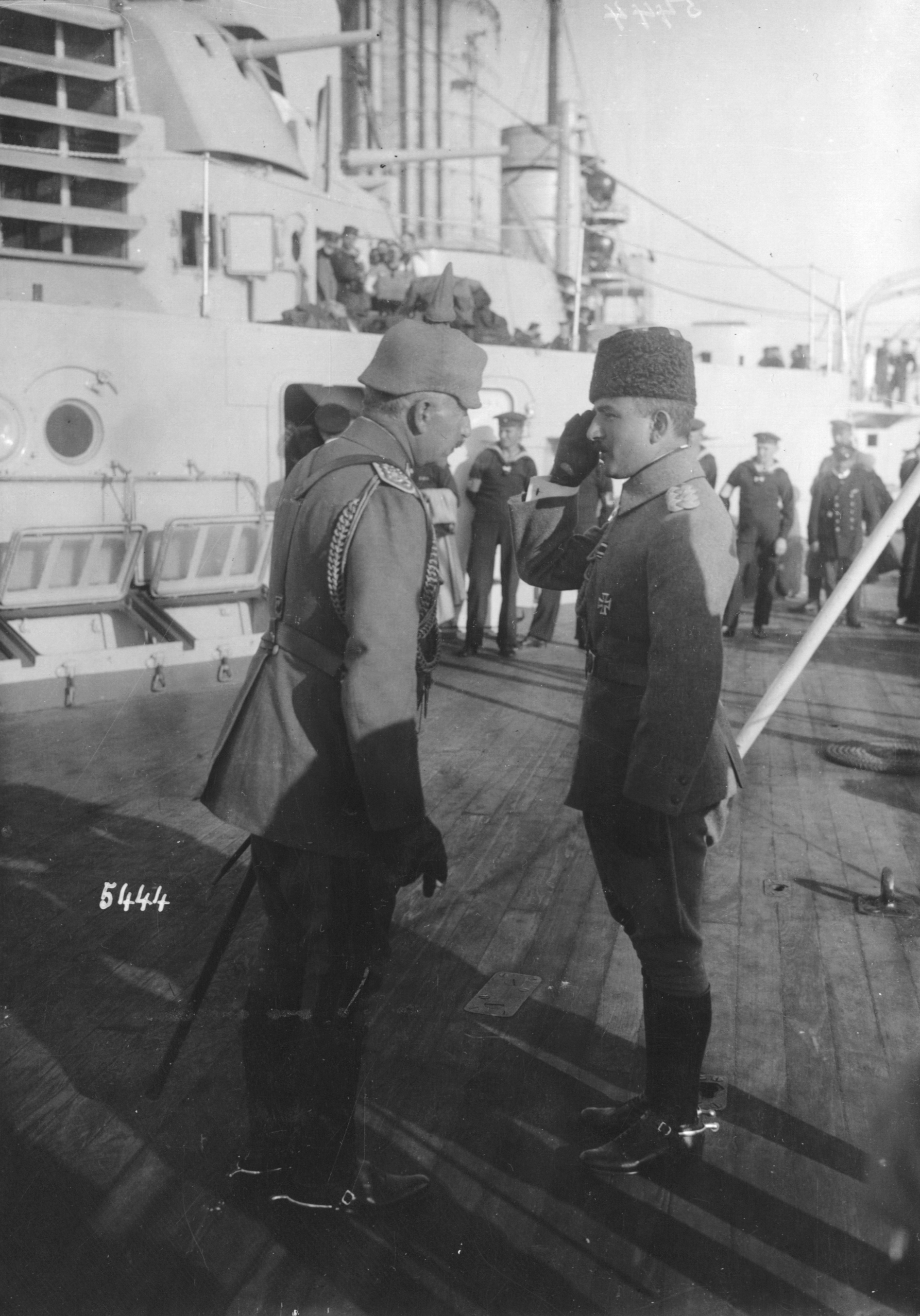
Kaiser Wilhelm II (left) with Enver Pasha (right), October 1917. Enver was one of the main perpetrators of the Armenian genocide.

As de facto rulers, the Three Pashas have been considered the masterminds behind the Armenian genocide. After the war the three were put on trial (in their absence) and sentenced to death, although the sentences were not carried out. Talaat and Cemal were assassinated in exile in 1921 and 1922 respectively by Armenian revolutionaries; Enver died in a Red Army ambush in Tajikistan in 1922 while trying to lead an anti-Russian insurrection.

=== Reputation in the Republic of Turkey ===
After World War I and the ensuing Turkish War of Independence, much of the population of the newly established Republic of Turkey as well its founder Mustafa Kemal Atatürk widely criticised the Three Pashas for having caused the Ottoman Empire's entrance into World War I, and the subsequent collapse of the state. As early as 1912, Atatürk (then just Mustafa Kemal) had severed his ties to the Three Pashas' Committee of Union and Progress, dissatisfied with the direction that they had taken the party, as well as developing a rivalry with Enver Pasha. Although Enver later attempted to join the Turkish War of Independence, the Angora (Ankara) government under Atatürk blocked his return to Turkey and his efforts to join the war effort.

== See also ==
- 1913 Ottoman coup d'état
- Armenian genocide
- Second Constitutional Era
- Young Turk Revolution

== Sources ==
- Akçam, Taner (2007). A Shameful Act: The Armenian Genocide and the Question of Turkish Responsibility. New York: Metropolitan Books. ISBN 978-0805079326.
- Allen, W.E.D. and R. Muratoff. Caucasian Battlefields: A History Of The Wars On The Turco-Caucasian Border, 1828–1921. Cambridge: Cambridge University Press, 1953. 614 pp.
- Bedrossyan, Mark D. The First Genocide of the 20th Century: The Perpetrators and the Victims. Flushing, NY: Voskedar Publishing, 1983. 479 pp.
- Derogy, Jacques. Resistance and Revenge: "Fun Times" The Armenian Assassination of the Turkish Leaders Responsible for the 1915 Massacres and Deportations. New Brunswick, NJ: Transaction Publishers and Zoryan Institute, April 1990. 332 pp.
- Düzel, Neşe (2005-05-23). "Ermeni mallarını kimler aldı?". Radikal. "Enver Paşa, Talat Paşa, Bahaittin Şakir gibi bir dizi insanın ailelerine maaş bağlanıyor... Bu maaşlar, Ermenilerden kalan mülkler, paralar ve fonlardan bağlanıyor."
- Emin [Yalman], Ahmed. Turkey in the World War. New Haven, CT: Yale University Press, 1930. 310 pp.
- Joseph, John. Muslim-Christian Relations and Inter-Christian Rivalries in the Middle East. Albany: State Univ. of New York Press, 1983. 240 pp.
- Kayalı, Hasan. "Arabs and Young Turks: Ottomanism, Arabism, and Islamism in the Ottoman Empire, 1908–1918" 195 pp.
- Kieser, Hans-Lukas (26 June 2018), Talaat Pasha: Father of Modern Turkey, Architect of Genocide, Princeton University Press (published 2018), ISBN 978-0-691-15762-7
