= Talaat Pasha =

Turkish Ottoman politician (1874–1921)

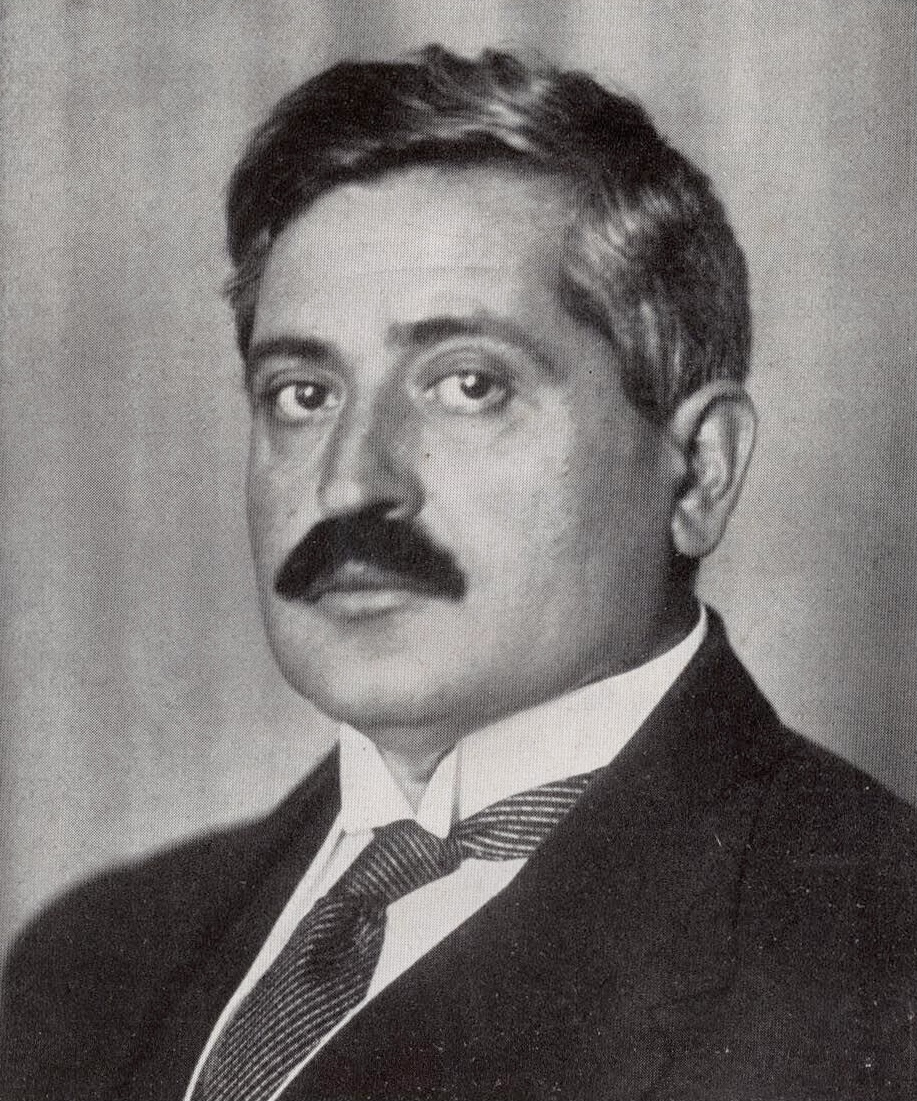
- Talaat in 1920

Grand Vizier of the Ottoman Empire
- In office 4 February 1917 – 8 October 1918
- Monarchs: Mehmed V Mehmed VI
- Preceded by: Said Halim Pasha
- Succeeded by: Ahmed Izzet Pasha

Minister of the Interior
- In office 12 June 1913 – 8 October 1918
- Grand Vizier: Himself; Said Halim Pasha
- Preceded by: Mehmed Adil
- Succeeded by: Mustafa Arif
- In office August 1909 – March 1911
- Grand Vizier: İbrahim Hakkı Pasha; Hüseyin Hilmi Pasha
- Preceded by: Mehmed Ferid Pasha
- Succeeded by: Halil Menteşe

Member of the Chamber of Deputies
- In office 17 December 1908 – 8 October 1918
- Constituency: Adrianople (1908, 1912, 1914)

Personal details
- Born: 1 September 1874 Kırcaali, then part of the Ottoman Empire
- Died: 15 March 1921 (aged 46) Berlin, Germany
- Cause of death: Gunshot wound
- Resting place: Monument of Liberty, Istanbul
- Party: Union and Progress Party
- Spouse: Hayriye Talat Bafralı
- Criminal information
- Conviction: Premeditated mass murder
- Trial: Ottoman Special Military Tribunal
- Penalty: Death (in absentia)

Details
- Target: Ottoman Armenians
- Killed: Around 1 million

Mehmed Talât Pasha (1 September 1874 – 15 March 1921), commonly known as Talaat Pasha or Talat Pasha, (Note: Ottoman Turkish: طلعت پاشا, romanized: Ṭalʿat Pâšâ; Turkish: Talât Paşa; Romani: Talat Pasha; Bulgarian: Талат паша; Note that he was known as "Talaat Bey", after gaining the "Bey" title, until he became Grand Vizier in 1917 and gained the "Pasha" title.) was a Turkish activist, revolutionary, politician, and convicted war criminal who served as the de facto leader of the Ottoman Empire from 1913 to 1918. He was chairman of the Union and Progress Party, which operated a one-party dictatorship in the Empire; during World War I he became Grand Vizier (prime minister). He has been called the architect of the Armenian genocide, and was responsible for other ethnic cleansings during his time as Minister of Interior Affairs.

Talaat was an early member of the Committee of Union and Progress (CUP), eventually leading its Salonica chapter during the Hamidian era. After the CUP succeeded in restoring the constitution and parliament in the 1908 Young Turk Revolution, he was elected as a deputy from Adrianople to the Chamber of Deputies and later became Minister of the Interior. He played an important role in the downfall of Sultan Abdul Hamid II the next year during the 31 March Incident by organizing a counter government. Multiple crises in the Empire including the 31 March Incident, attacks on Rumelian Muslims in the Balkan Wars, and the power struggle with the Freedom and Accord Party made Talaat and the Unionists disillusioned with multicultural Ottomanism and political pluralism, turning them into hard-line authoritarian Turkish nationalists.

In 1913, Talaat and Ismail Enver carried out a coup d'état with Mahmud Şevket Pasha as a reluctant partner. With the latter's assassination, an autocratic triumvirate of CUP Central Committee members lead the Ottoman Empire, consisting of himself, Enver, and Ahmed Cemal (known as the Three Pashas) of whom Talaat was its civilian leader. Talaat and Enver were influential in bringing the Ottoman Empire into the First World War. During World War I, he ordered on 24 April 1915 the arrest and deportation of Armenian intellectuals in Constantinople (now Istanbul), most of them being ultimately murdered, and on 30 May 1915 promulgated the Temporary Law of Deportation; these events initiated the Armenian genocide. He is widely considered the main perpetrator of the genocide, and is thus held responsible for the death of around 1 million Armenians.

In a move that established total Unionist control over the Turkish government, Talaat Pasha became Grand Vizier in 1917. He personally negotiated the Treaty of Brest-Litovsk with the Bolsheviks, regaining parts of Eastern Anatolia which were occupied by Russia since 1878, and introduced many social reforms. However breakthroughs by the Allies in the Macedonia and Palestine fronts meant defeat for the Ottomans and the downfall of the CUP, whereupon he resigned. On the night of 2–3 November 1918, Talaat Pasha and other members of the CUP's central committee fled the country. The Ottoman Special Military Tribunal convicted and sentenced him to death in absentia for subverting the constitution, profiteering from the war, and organizing massacres against Greeks and Armenians. Exiled in Berlin, he supported the Turkish Nationalists led by Mustafa Kemal Pasha (Atatürk) in Turkey's War of Independence. He was killed in Berlin in 1921 by Soghomon Tehlirian, a member of the Armenian Revolutionary Federation, as part of Operation Nemesis.

== Early life: 1874–1908 ==
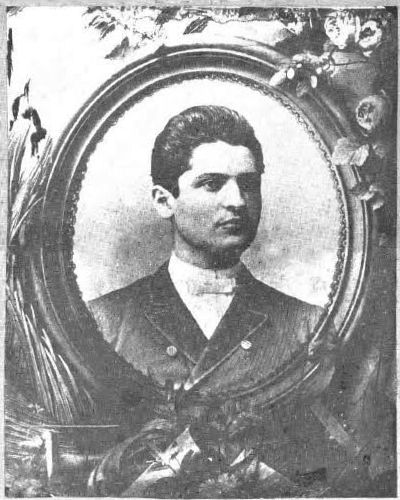
Early portrait

=== Childhood ===
Mehmed Talaat was born in 1874 in Kırcaali, Adrianople (Edirne) Vilayet into a middle-class family of Romani, Turkish, and Pomak descent. His father, Ahmet Vasıf, was a kadı from Çeplece, a nearby village. His mother Hürmüz was from a Turkish family that migrated to the region from Dedeler village, Kayseri. Talaat's family fled to Constantinople (Istanbul) when their home was occupied by Russian troops during the 1877–1878 Russo-Turkish war, an experience that contributed to Talaat's nationalism. His father died when Talaat was eleven years old, putting his mother and two sisters under his care.

Talaat had a powerful build and a dark complexion. His manners were gruff, which caused him to be expelled from the military secondary school at the age of sixteen without a certificate after a conflict with his teacher. Without earning a degree, he joined the staff of a telegraph company as a postal clerk in Adrianople to provide for his family. His salary was not high, so he worked after hours as a Turkish language teacher in the Alliance Israelite School which served the Jewish community of Adrianople. At the age of 21 Talaat was involved in a love affair with the daughter of the Jewish headmaster for whom he worked.

=== Activism against Abdul Hamid II ===
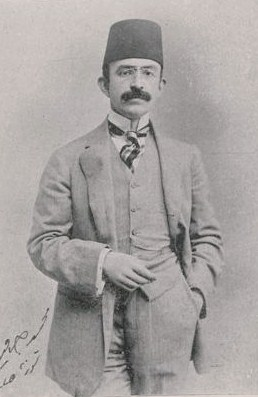
Mehmed Cavid, Talaat's friend and Unionist Minister of Finance, who was an opponent of his Turkification policies

The Ottoman Empire was ruled by the sultan Abdul Hamid II, who ran a modern autocracy, complete with a secret police, mass surveillance, and censorship. This autocracy in turn produced a culture of suspicion as well as a spirit of clandestine rebellion in many Ottoman citizens, young Talaat included. He was caught sending a telegram saying "Things are going well. I'll soon reach my goal." He was confronted by the police for this telegram, and claimed that the message was to his dalliance, who defended him. With two of his friends from the post office, he was charged with tampering with the official telegraph and was arrested in 1893.

After being released from prison, he joined the Committee of Union and Progress (CUP), a revolutionary Young Turk organization which was agitating against Abdul Hamid's autocracy. In 1896 he was imprisoned for having been part of a CUP cell together with his brother-in-law. Sentenced to three years in jail, Talaat was pardoned after serving two years but exiled to Salonika (Thessaloniki), where he became a postal clerk in July 1898. Between 1898 and 1908 he served as a postman on the staff of the Salonika Post Office, during which he continued his revolutionary activities in secret. He was promoted to municipal chief clerk in April 1903, following which he could afford to bring his mother and sisters to Salonika. His job in the postal administration gave him the opportunity to smuggle into the city newspapers published by the dissidents abroad. That year he joined the Salonica Freemason Lodge Macedonia Risorta and began a correspondence with Ahmed Rıza. Talaat met then economics professor, later friend and CUP Finance Minister Mehmed Cavid in Salonika Law School, where he took classes to supplement his lackluster education. The government was still monitoring his activities, and he was almost exiled again to Anatolia. However the Inspector General for Macedonia Hüseyin Hilmi Pasha was partial towards the secret committee and intervened, and Talaat returned to Salonika to work as a school principal.

In September 1906, the Ottoman Freedom Committee (OFC) was formed as another secret Young Turk organization based in Salonika. The founders of the OFC included Talaat, the CUP's future general secretary Dr. Midhat Şükrü, Mustafa Rahmi, and İsmail Canbulat. He served on the Central Committee of the OFC with Rahmi and Canbulat. Many officers of the Third Army were recruited into the OFC, including the future heroes of the revolution Ahmed Niyazi and İsmail Enver. Under Talaat's initiative, the Salonika-based OFC merged with Ahmed Rıza's Paris-based CUP in September 1907, and the group became the internal center of the CUP in the Ottoman Empire. Talaat was briefly secretary-general of the internal CUP, while Bahattin Şakir was secretary-general of the external CUP. After the revolution, Talaat's more radical and militant internal CUP would see themselves supplant the older cadre of Young Turks that was Rıza's network of exiles.

== Rise to power: 1908–1913 ==
=== Young Turk Revolution and aftermath ===
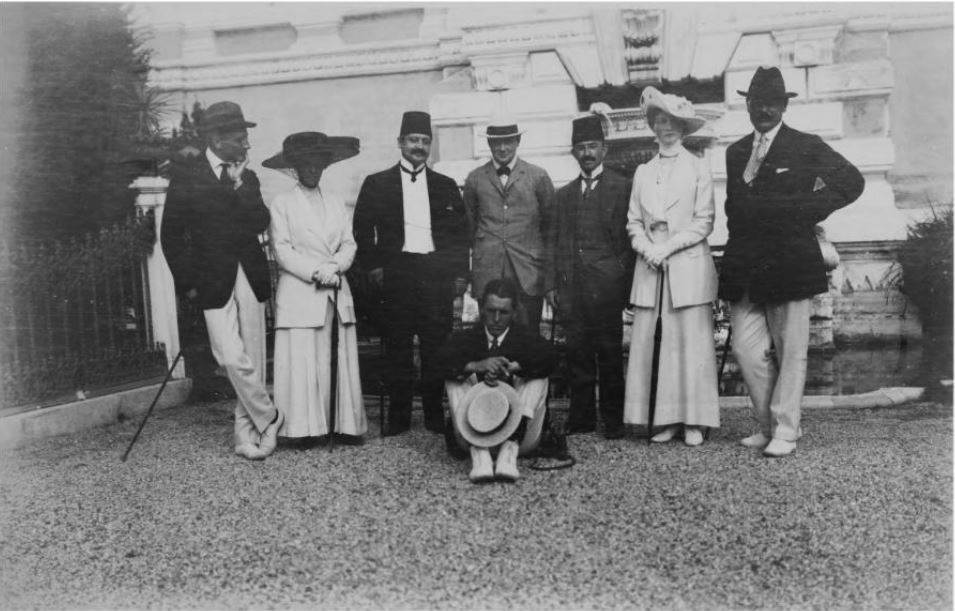
Winston Churchill between Talaat Bey and Cavid Bey (both wearing fezzes) during his private stay in Istanbul in July 1910

The Unionists found themselves at the behest of a spontaneous revolution in the summer of 1908, which commenced with Niyazi and Enver's flight into the Albanian hinterlands. Talaat's role during the Young Turk Revolution was to organize a plot to assassinate the garrison commander of Salonika, Ömer Nâzım, who was a Hamidian loyalist and spy master of the area. Nâzım survived his hired Fedai with injury, but the incident, as well as other assassinations carried out by the CUP during the revolution, intimidated the Hamidian establishment enough to reopen the parliament and reinstate the constitution. For the first time in three decades, an election was held for the Chamber of Deputies, which this time featured political parties. Talaat was easily elected into parliament as Union and Progress's candidate for deputy of Adrianople, and then was elected the parliament's deputy-president under Rıza.

A year later in the 31 March Incident, what started out as an anti-Unionist demonstration in the capital quickly turned into an anticonstitutionalist-monarchist counter revolution where Abdul Hamid attempted to reestablish his autocracy. The Grand Vizier Hüseyin Hilmi Pasha was forced to resign for Ahmed Tevfik Pasha. Khachatur Malumian, leader of the Dashnak Party, hid Talaat and Dr. Nâzım in his house while mob violence targeted MPs. Three days later, Talaat and 100 MPs escaped Constantinople for Ayastefanos (Yeşilköy) to organize a separate national assembly from the volatile situation in Constantinople, and declared the change in government illegal. Relief came in the form of pro-constitutionalist forces known as the Action Army led by Mahmud Şevket Pasha, which stopped in Ayastefanos before marching on the capital; it was secretly agreed there that Abdul Hamid would be replaced by his brother. After the reactionary revolt was crushed, Talaat bullied the Shaykh-al-Islam Sahip Molla to get a fatwa for Abdul Hamid's deposition, and convinced Tevfik Pasha to step down and return Hilmi Pasha to the premiership. With the fatwa, the parliament voted to depose Abdul Hamid II. Talaat and Ahmed Muhtar Pasha headed the delegation to announce to Prince Reşad of his ascension to the throne.

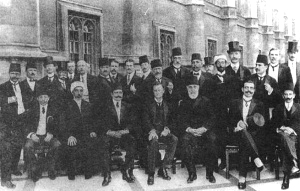
Talaat Bey, British Foreign Minister Lord Grey, London Ambassador Ahmet Tevfik Pasha, Aga Khan, 1909

In August 1909 Mehmed Talaat led a 17-member parliamentary delegation to Westminster. He learned there that he was appointed Minister of the Interior in Hilmi Pasha's cabinet reshuffle, becoming the second Unionist with a cabinet position (first being Cavid as Finance Minister). He continued Hamidian era anti-Zionist restrictions in Ottoman Palestine, as well as enforce imperial rule in revolting provinces like Albania and Yemen. That year, Louis Rambert, director of the Régie des Tabacs, wrote that Talaat was "the acknowledged head of the Committee of Union and Progress and the Young Turks." Biographer Hans-Lukas Kieser writes that he was under the influence of Bahattin Şakir and Mehmed Nâzım before 1908, but after late 1909 he had an increased interest in the new Central Committee member Ziya Gökalp and his more revolutionary and Pan-Turkist ideas.

=== Crisis for the committee ===
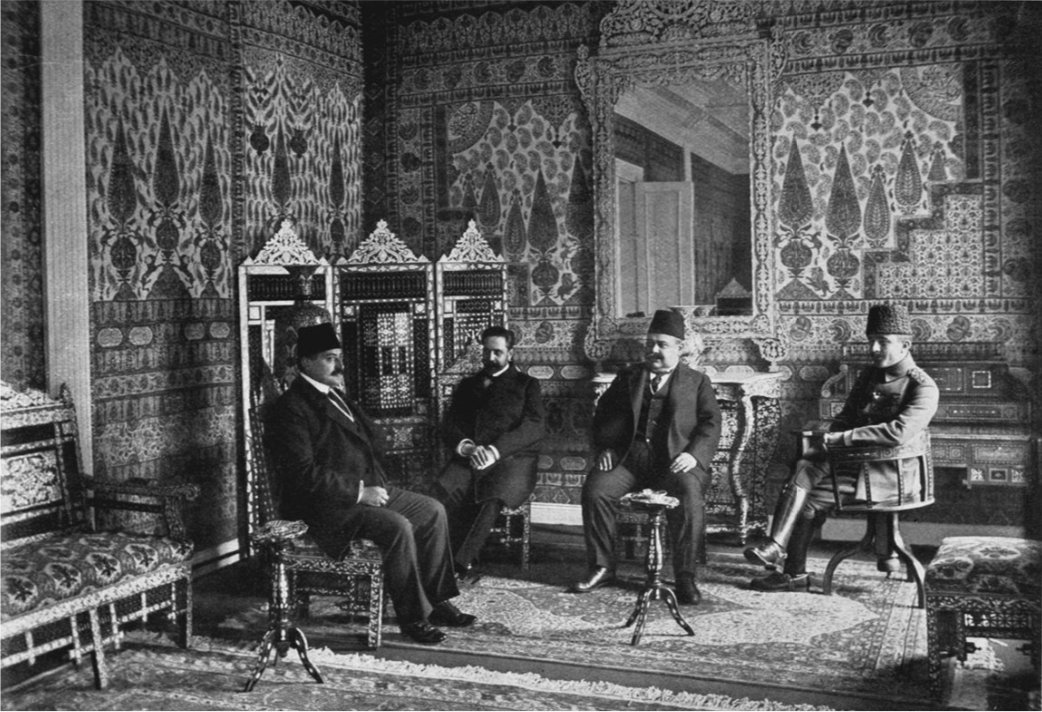
Talaat with CUP leaders Halil Bey and Enver Pasha and Naum Tyufekchiev, 1915

As tension built between the CUP and opposition, a meeting between Krikor Zohrab, Cavid, Talat, Halil Menteşe, İbrahim Hakkı Pasha, Vartkes Serengülian, and Karekin Pastermadjian, where the main topic of discussion was the CUP's lack of commitment to pluralism. The central committee voted against the opposition's points for cooperation, inflaming the already toxic political climate. On 21 November 1911, the opposition united around the Freedom and Accord Party. Talaat already had to step down as Interior Minister in March 1911 for his fellow committee-man Halil Menteşe. As a new election was called for 1912, Talaat made sure to be appointed Minister of Post and Telegraph on 22 January 1912 so the election outcome could be certain.

In the 1912 election known as the "election of clubs", Union and Progress won a lopsided victory against the Freedom and Accord Party due to widespread employment of electoral fraud and violence. As a result, Freedom and Accord organized a group in the military known as the Savior Officers to bring down the CUP dominated legislature. Talaat urged for Şevket Pasha, who was appointed Minister of War after the 31 March Incident, to resign as in the lead-up to the coup d'état, something he wrote that he regretted once Şevket Pasha did so in support of the Savior Officers. Eventually, pro-CUP Grand Vizier Said Pasha had to acquiesce to the Savior Officers demands, and the parliament was dissolved with a new election to take place in autumn of 1912. It was no longer safe for Unionists to be in the open, and it was plausible that the CUP would be banned by the government. Talaat had to once again lay low, hiding with Midhat Şükrü, Hasan Tahsin, and Cemal Azmi in Tahsin's brother-in-law's house. By 1912 Talaat definitely abandoned the belief that constitutionalism and rule of law could unite the multi-ethnic and fragmented "Ottoman nation", which was the original raison d'être of the Young Turks, and turned to more radical politics. He and other high ranking CUP leaders organized and gave speeches in a pro-war rally against the Balkan nations in Sultanahmet Square before the Balkan Wars broke out.

The Savior Officer-backed government of Ahmed Muhtar Pasha fell soon after when the Balkan League achieved decisive victory over the Ottoman Empire in the First Balkan War. Talaat volunteered for the war, but was dismissed from the army for distributing political propaganda. The CUP's headquarters in Salonika had to be relocated to Constantinople when the city fell to Greece, while his hometown of Adrianople was besieged by the Bulgarians. The imperial capital swelled with Rumelian Muslim refugees that were expelled from the Balkans. The scheduled election had to be canceled, and Kâmil Pasha's government started peace negotiations with the Balkan League in December. Following rumors that the government was willing to surrender Adrianople which was still under siege, Talaat and Enver began plotting a coup. The coup launched on 23 January 1913, known as the Raid on the Sublime Porte, succeeded in overthrowing the government, with Kâmil Pasha and his cabinet resigning for Mahmud Şevket Pasha's national unity government which this time included the CUP, and resumed fighting. Talaat and Enver urged Şevket Pasha to accept the Grand Vezierate, but mutual distrust between the generalissimo and the committee meant Talaat only came back as deputy Interior Minister, so he employed komiteci politics to stay influential. He urged for the Empire to continue fighting in the First Balkan War to relieve Adrianople, as well as order the arrests against leading Freedom and Accord members and journalists in the subsequent state of emergency. However, with demands from the great powers to surrender Adrianople and a deteriorating military situation, Şevket Pasha and the CUP finally acknowledged defeat.

== Union and Progress regime: 1913–1918 ==
=== Consolidating power ===
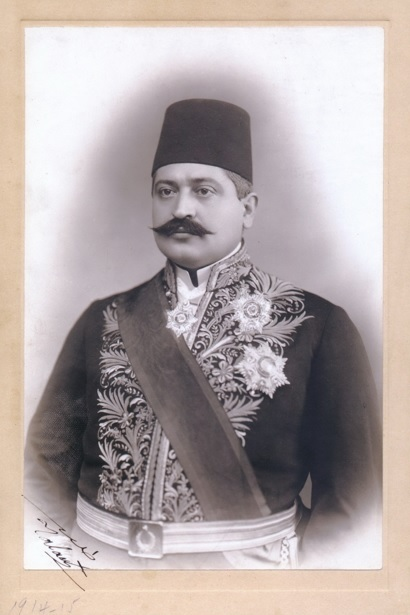
Talaat in diplomatic costume

Once Şevket Pasha was out of the picture due to his assassination on 12 July 1913, the CUP established a de facto one-party state in the Ottoman Empire (Turkey). Talaat returned as interior minister in Said Halim Pasha's cabinet. He kept this post until the CUP's fall from power following Turkey's surrender in World War I in 1918. Talaat, with Enver and commandant Ahmet Cemal, formed a group later known as the Three Pashas. These men were a triumvirate that controlled the government until the end of World War I in October 1918. However historian Hans-Lukas Kieser asserts that this state of rule by triumvirate was accurate for only the years 1913–1914, and thereafter Talaat was the sole dictator of the Ottoman Empire, especially once he became Grand Vizier in 1917. Erik Jan Zürcher instead asserts a rule of diarchy, with Talaat leader of the civilian government and Enver the military, especially after Cemal Pasha's dispatch to Syria. Kieser asserts his Turkey was not a totalitarian state, but a balance of many factions maintained through kickbacks and corruption. Strong governors had much maneuverability to themselves, provided they execute Talaat and the central committee's new Turkification programmes.

That summer came Bulgaria's attack on Greece and Serbia, starting the Second Balkan War. Talaat was able to procure an important loan from the Régie to ensure success in retaking Adrianople. Turkey soon joined the war, retaking the city even though the great powers had forced them to surrender Adrianople only months earlier. Talaat symbolically joined the army and took part in the recapture. This was a failure of diplomacy by the great powers; for Talaat and the committee, this moment made them learn to not take international diplomacy seriously if the situation on the ground reflected otherwise. He led the negotiations with Bulgaria in the Constantinople conference, which resulted in a population exchange and formalizing Turkish reassertion of sovereignty over Adrianople. Talaat would negotiate another peace with Greece too. This peace was very tenuous however, as Talaat, Enver Pasha, and Mahmud Celal (Bayar), secretary of the local CUP branch, organized the deportations of Rûm in the Smyrna Vilayet, which almost started a war with Greece. Talaat was confronted by the sultan when the sultan learned of the deportations, but insisted that the stories of persecution of Rûm were fabricated by the Empire's enemies.

Between 1911 and 1914 Turkey negotiated with the European powers and the Dashnak Party on reform in the East. He attended multiple meetings with leading Armenian politicians Krikor Zohrab, Karekin Pastermadjian, Bedros Hallachian, and Vartkes Serengülian, however lack of trust between the old allies of the committee and the Dashnaks and growing radicalism within the CUP slowed negotiations. Under overwhelming diplomatic pressure, a reform package was finally produced in December 1914, but it would be soon terminated under wartime conditions and an about-face by the committee on the Armenian question. On 6 September, Talaat Pasha sent a telegram to the governors of Hüdâvendigâr (Bursa), İzmit, Canik, Adrianople, Adana, Aleppo, Erzurum, Bitlis, Van, Sivas, Mamuretülaziz (Elazığ), and Diyarbekir to prepare for the arrests of Ottoman Armenian citizens. Armenians and Assyrians within the Empire began organising themselves into militias to protect themselves as the Special Organisation, a Unionist paramilitary, started harassing them.

=== Entering World War I ===
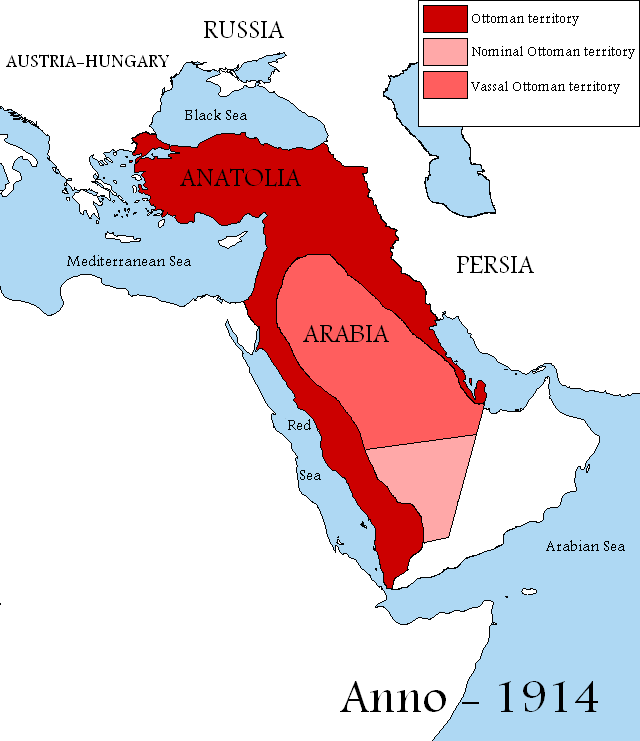
The Ottoman Empire in 1914

Throughout the Second Constitutional Era, Turkey was diplomatically isolated, which it paid for dearly through territorial losses in the Balkans. Therefore, on 9 May, Talaat and Ahmet İzzet Pasha met with Czar Nicholas II and Sergei Sazanov to propose an alliance with Russia, which ended up falling through. Talaat, Enver, and Halil were successful in securing a secret alliance with Germany during the July Crisis. Following the sale of the Goeben and Breslau to Turkey, the three convinced Cemal Pasha to agree to a naval strike against Russia. The resulting declarations of war saw many resign from the government, including Cavid, which saddened Talaat. He became finance minister in Cavid's place.

With the expectation that the new war would free the Empire of its constraints on its sovereignty by the great powers, Talaat went ahead with accomplishing major goals of the CUP; unilaterally abolishing the centuries-old Capitulations, prohibiting foreign postal services, terminating Lebanon's autonomy, and suspending the reform package for the Eastern Anatolian provinces that had been in effect for just seven months. This unilateral action prompted a joyous rally in Sultanahmet Square.

Talaat and his committee hoped to save Turkey by quickly and decisively establishing Turan by capitalizing on the declaration of Jihad. But Enver Pasha's decisive defeat in Sarikamish and Cemal Pasha's failure to take Suez meant Talaat had to come to terms with the reality on the ground, which made him fall into a depression. He worked to keep morale afloat on the crumbling Caucasian front by relaying false information of successes in wars in the Balkans which weren't even happening.

=== Armenian genocide ===
A report presented to Talaat and Cevdet Bey (governor of Van Vilayet) by Dashnak members Arshak Vramian and Vahan Papazian on atrocities committed by the Special Organisation against Armenians in Van created more friction between the two organisations. However, the Unionists were still not yet confident enough to purge Armenians from politics or pursue policies of ethnic engineering. Victory of the defence of the Bosphorus on 18 March though galvanized Talaat, and he decided to take action by starting the machinations of the destruction of Christian minorities in Turkey.

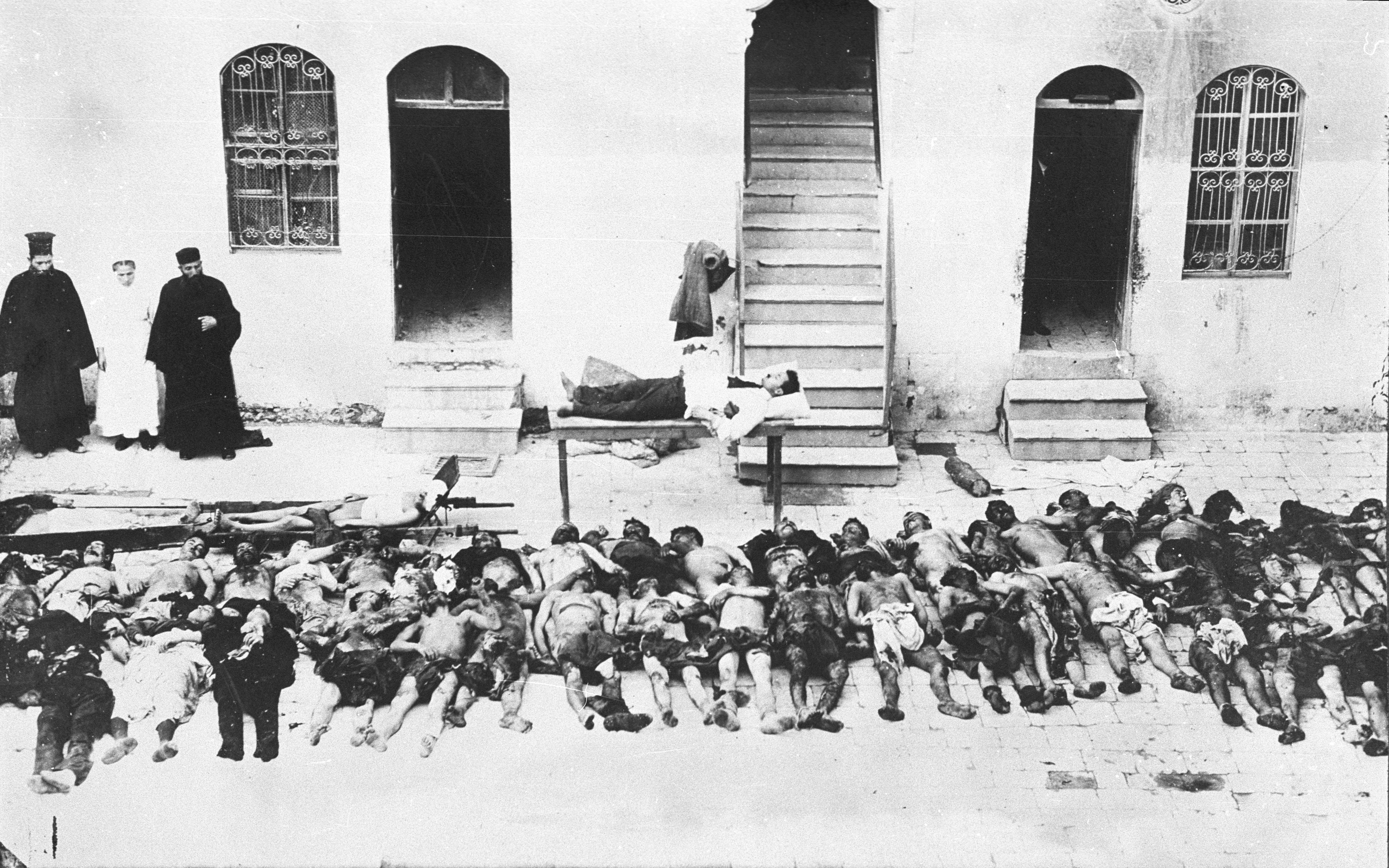
Corpses of massacred Armenians, 1918

On 24 April 1915, Talaat Pasha issued an order to close all Armenian political organizations operating within Turkey and arrest Armenians connected to them, justifying the action by stating that the organizations were controlled from outside the empire, were inciting upheavals behind the Turkish lines, and were cooperating with Russian forces. This order resulted in the arrest on the night of 24–25 April 1915 of 235 to 270 Armenian community leaders in Constantinople, including Dashnak and Hunchak politicians, clergymen, physicians, authors, journalists, lawyers, and teachers, the majority of whom were eventually murdered, including his colleagues Krikor Zohrab and Vartkes Serengülian. Although the mass killings of Armenian civilians had begun in Van several weeks earlier, these mass arrests in Constantinople are considered by many commentators to be the start of the Armenian genocide.

"Talat told Dr. Mordtman, the man in charge of the Armenian desk and the dragoman at the German Embassy at Istanbul, that Turkey was "intent on taking advantage of the war in order to thoroughly liquidate its internal foes, i.e., the indigenous Christians, without being thereby disturbed by foreign intervention."

He then issued the order for the Tehcir Law of 1 June 1915 to 8 February 1916 that allowed for the mass deportation of Armenians, a principal means of carrying out what is now recognized as a genocide against Armenians. The deportees did not receive any humanitarian assistance and there is no evidence that the Turkish government provided the extensive facilities and supplies that would have been necessary to sustain the life of hundreds of thousands of Armenian deportees during their forced march to the Syrian Desert or after. Meanwhile, the deportees were subject to periodic rape and massacre. Talaat, who was a telegraph operator from a young age, had installed a telegraph machine in his own home and sent "sensitive" telegrams during the course of the deportations. This was confirmed by his wife Hayriye, who stated that she often saw him using it to give direct orders to what she believed were provincial governors.

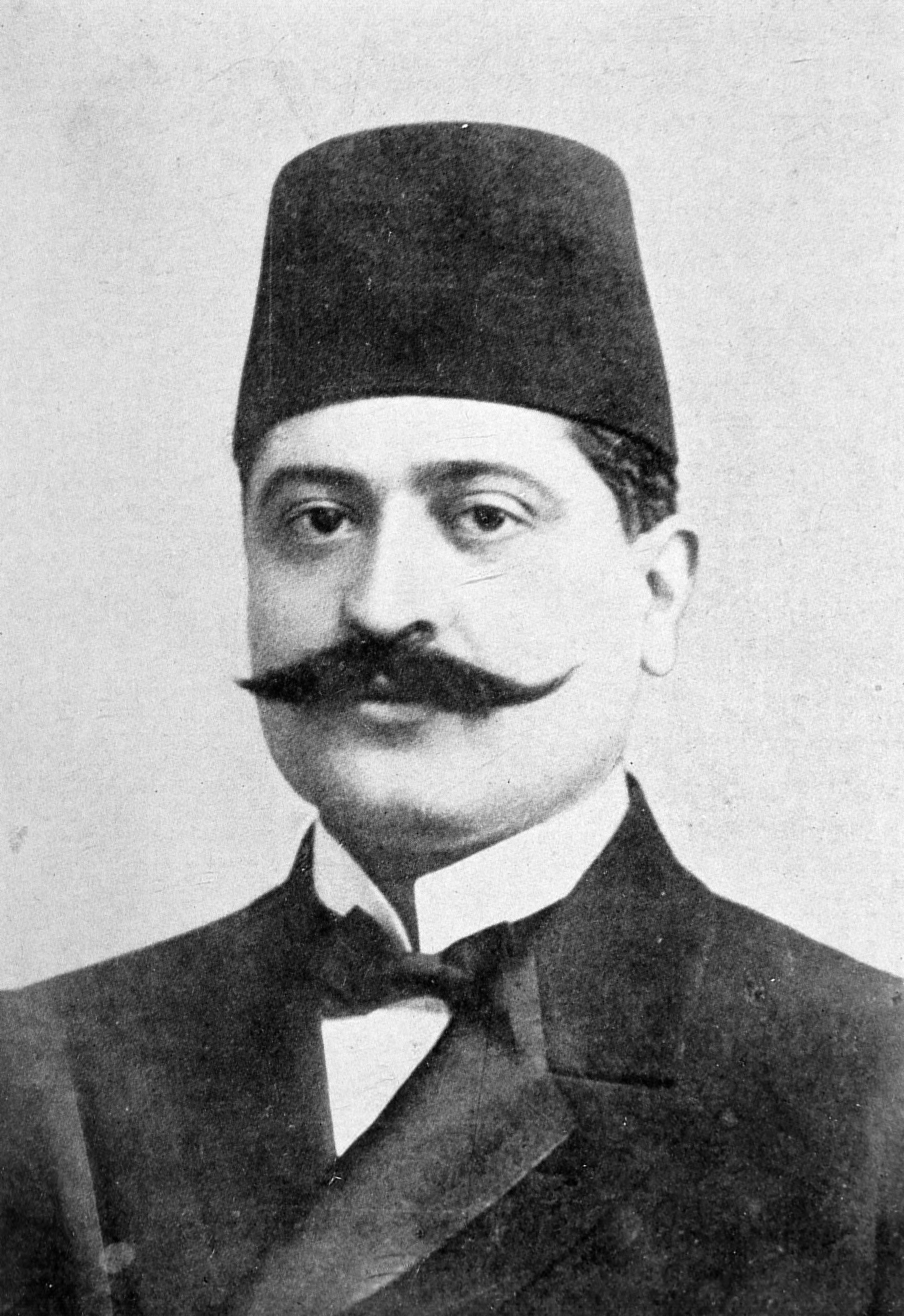
Talaat in 1916

Numerous diplomats and notable figures confronted Talaat Pasha over the deportations and news of massacres. He had several conversations with the United States ambassador, Henry Morgenthau, Sr. On 2 August 1915 Talaat told him that "our Armenian policy is absolutely fixed and that nothing can change it. We will not have the Armenians anywhere in Anatolia. They can live in the desert but nowhere else." In another exchange, he demanded from Morgenthau the list of the holders of American insurance policies belonging to Armenians in an effort to appropriate the funds to the state. Morgenthau refused. Talaat told him in a later conversation that:

It is no use for you to argue . . . we have already disposed of three quarters of the Armenians; there are none at all left in Bitlis, Van, and Erzeroum. The hatred between the Turks and the Armenians is now so intense that we have got to finish with them. If we don't, they will plan their revenge.

Talaat believed Armenian deportation avenged the Muslim expulsions of the Balkan Wars, and resettled Muhacir in abandoned Armenian property.

The Assyrian Christian community was also targeted by the Unionist government in what is now known as the Seyfo. Talaat ordered the governor of Van to remove the Assyrian population in Hakkâri, leading to the deaths of hundreds of thousands, however this anti-Assyrian policy could not be implemented nationally.

Meanwhile, deportations of the Rûm were put on hold as Germany wished for a Greek ally or neutrality, however for the sake of their alliance, German reaction to the deportations of Armenians was muted. The participation of Turkey as an ally against the Entente powers was crucial to German grand strategy in the war, and good relations were needed. Following Russian breakthrough in the Caucasus and signs that Greece would side with the Allied powers after all, the CUP was finally able to resume operations against the Greeks of the empire, and Talaat ordered the deportation of the Pontus Greeks of the Black Sea coast.

Talaat was also a leading force in the Turkification and deportation of Kurds. In May 1916 he mandated Kurds be deported to the western region of Anatolia, and prohibited the resettlement of Kurds to the south in order to prevent Kurds from becoming Arabized. He was a major force behind the policies regarding the resettlement of Kurds and wanted to be informed of whether the Kurds would really be turkified or not and how they got along with the Turkish inhabitants in the areas where they had been resettled too. Talaat outlined that nowhere in the Empire's vilayets should the Kurdish population be more than 5%. To that end, Balkan Muslim and Turkish refugees were prioritised to be resettled in Urfa, Maraş, and Antep, while some Kurds were deported to Central Anatolia. Kurds were also supposed to be resettled in abandoned Armenian property, however negligence by resettlement authorities still resulted in the deaths of many Kurds by famine.

Approximately 1.7 million Christians (including 200,000 Greeks and 100,000 Lebanese Christians and Druze) died during World War I and the total Ottoman war deaths of some 3.7 million amounted to 14% of the prewar population. According to the Ottoman Interior Ministry, the population of Ottoman Armenians decreased to 284,000 from 1,256,000.

=== Premiership ===
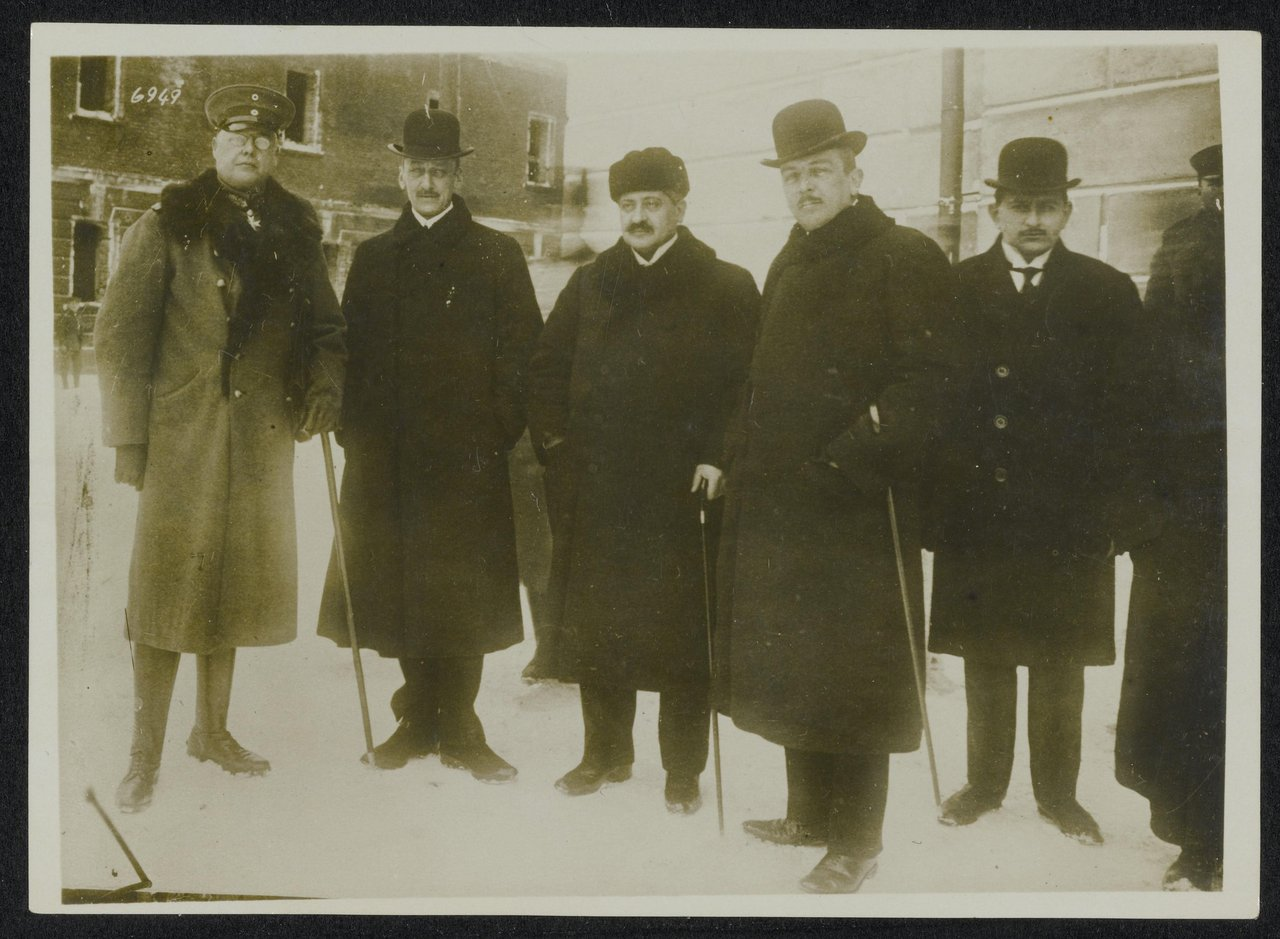
Talaat Pasha with Central Power negotiators at Brest-Litovsk

On 4 February 1917, Talaat finally replaced Said Halim Pasha (a puppet of the committee anyway) by becoming the Grand Vizier of the Ottoman Empire, while also retaining the Ministry of the Interior. This move was precipitated by the liquidation of the Islamist faction of the party. This made him the first member of parliament to become a Prime Minister in Ottoman (and Turkish) history. This move completed the Unionist party-state, as he was both Grand Vizier and chairman of the Union and Progress Party. Talaat, at the time he became Grand Vizier, gained the title "Pasha".

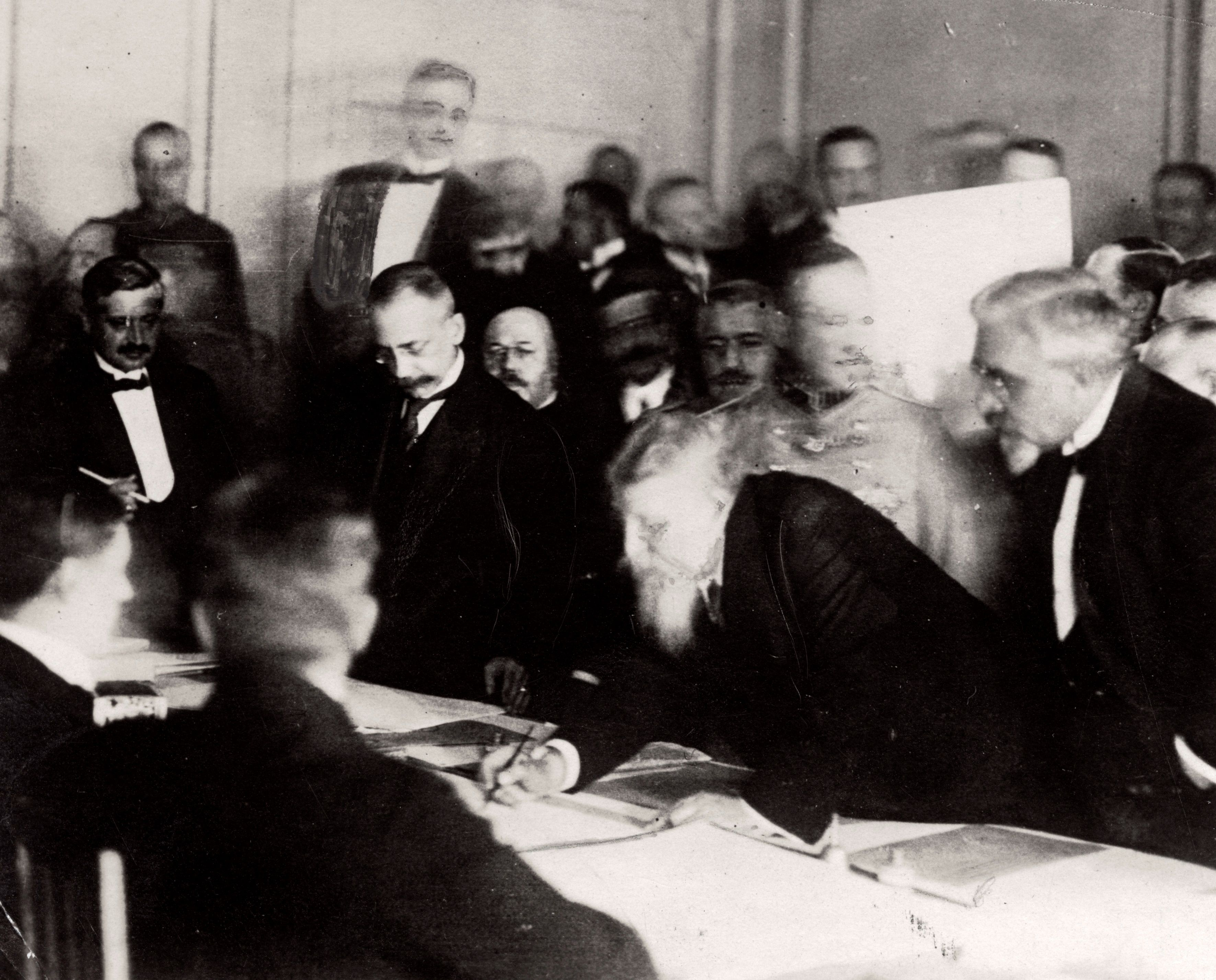
Signing the Treaty of Brest-Litovsk

On 15 February, Talaat Pasha gave a speech to parliament of his program, expressing his will to reform Ottoman society to be on par with European civilization. Like first president of the succeeding republic, Mustafa Kemal (Atatürk), would later say similarly, Talaat Pasha believed that there was "only one civilization in the world [Europe], [and that Turkey] to be saved, must be joined to civilization." Another point brought up was cracking down on corruption, much of which he was responsible for and never followed through with.

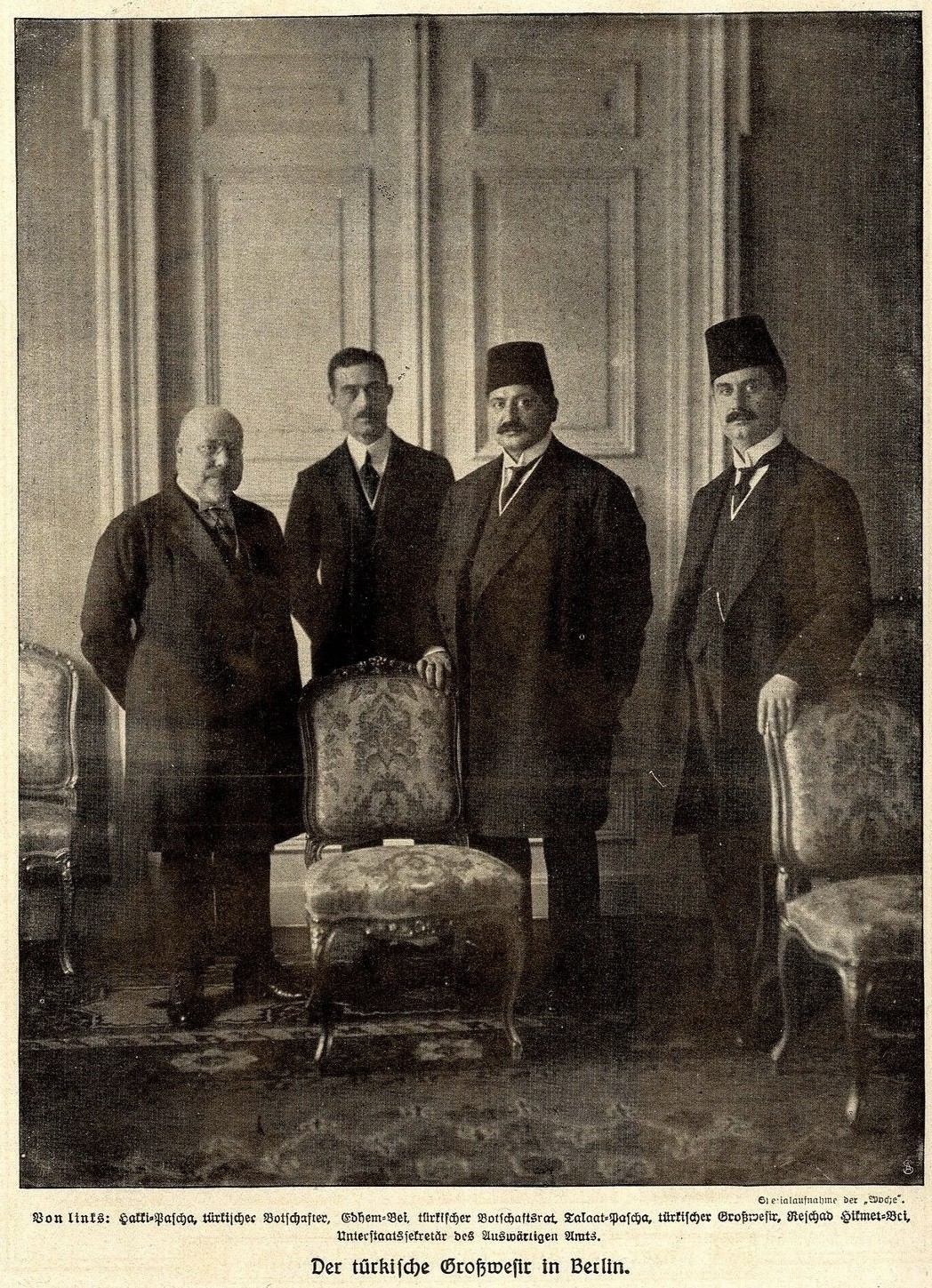
Talaat Pasha at Berlin with his diplomatic team

Many social reforms were introduced, including modernization of the calendar, employment of women as nurses, in charitable organizations, in army shops, and in labor battalions behind the front and new faculties in Istanbul University for architecture, arts, and music. One particular piece of controversial social reform was the 1917 "Temporal Family Law" which was a significant advance in women's rights and secularism in Turkish matrimonial law. When it came to religious reform, the Quran was translated into Turkish, and even the call to prayer was held in Turkish in a few select mosques in the capital. These pre-Kemalist secularisation and modernisation reforms paved the way for further and more far reaching reforms by Atatürk's regime.

During this time tensions flared between Talaat and Enver. Enver won out in a conflict over prioritizing rationing in favor of the army. In response Talaat established the Ministry of Rationing, and appointed a loyal friend, Kara Kemal, as its head (Kara Kemal was known as the "Little Master" [Küçük Efendi], whereas Talat was the "Grand Master" [Büyük Efendi]). In a play of zugzwang after the Balfour Declaration, Talaat reproached with the Zionist movement, promising to open up Jewish immigration to Jerusalem. This promise did not reflect ground conditions, as his first year as Grand Vizier saw the loss of Jerusalem and Baghdad.

However territorial loss in the south coincided with diplomatic success with the signing of the Brest-Litovsk treaty in March 1918, with Talaat himself negotiating for Turkey, resulting in the return of Kars, Batumi, and Ardahan after their loss forty years ago. Another treaty with the Caucasian states signed in Batum strengthened Turkey's position in a future drive on Baku, which was accomplished by September. Spring 1918 was the zenith of Unionist power and Talaat Pasha's political career, followed by a slow realization of defeat in WWI over the summer. In a conversation with Cavid, Talaat felt trapped between three "fires": Enver Pasha, who was becoming increasingly erratic and overly optimistic after the breakthrough in the Caucasus; the new sultan Mehmed VI Vahdeddin, an anti-Unionist who was more assertive than his deceased half brother, and the Allied armies advancing from the West and the South. As Talaat was returning from Germany to mend worsening relations in late September 1918, he was informed by the Bulgarians they were leaving the war after the breakthrough on the Macedonian Front. He told his entourage in the train car "Şimdi bok yedik" ('We've had it', literally 'We've eaten shit'). Their capitulation left no sufficient forces to check an Allied advance on the Ottoman capital. Simultaneously the British routed both Turkish armies they faced on the Palestinian front in the Battle of Megiddo. With defeat certain (and growing unrest from years of unfettered corruption) Talaat Pasha announced his intention to resign on 8 October 1918 and lead a caretaker government for a few more days. Ahmed İzzet Pasha, who was Talaat's choice, succeeded him as Grand Vizier and signed the Armistice of Mudros with Britain, ending hostilities in the Middle East on 30 October.

== Exile: 1918–1921 ==
=== Escape to Germany ===
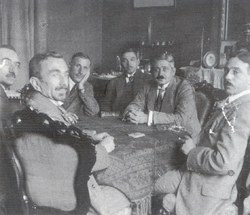
Talaat with his friends in exile, Holland, 1920

Talaat Pasha delivered a farewell speech in the last CUP congress on 1 November, where it was decided to dissolve the party. With Enver, Cemal, Nâzım, Şakir, Azmi, and Osman Bedri, he fled the Turkish capital on a German torpedo boat that night where they landed in Sevastopol, Crimea and scattered from there. Before escaping the empire, he wrote a letter to İzzet, who facilitated his escape, promising his return to the country. Public opinion was shocked and outraged by the departure of Talaat Pasha, as many were expecting him to be arrested. It also left the country in a sudden power vacuum. According to the testimony of Midhat Şükrü, the CUP's long time secretary-general, and Dr. Nâzım, their decision to flee was driven by them being persecuted for their actions solving the Armenian question.

Talaat, Nâzım, Şakir and some other Turkish officers wound up in Berlin on 10 November, the day after Kaiser Wilhelm II fled the city due to the November Revolution. The new chancellor, Friedrich Ebert of the SPD, signed the documents secretly allowing Talaat asylum in Germany, where he and Nâzım settled in a flat at Hardenbergerstraße 4 (Ernst-Reuter Square), Charlottenburg, under the pseudonym "Ali Sâî Bey". Next to his apartment he founded the "Oriental Club" (Şark Kulübü), where anti-Entente Muslims and European activists met. Though he was a wanted man in Turkey and Britain, Talaat managed to attend the Socialist International in the Netherlands. He was also able to travel to Italy, Switzerland, Sweden, and Denmark. In all of these visits, he lobbied against the new Allied world-order, specifically against their designs on the partition of the Ottoman Empire. Behind bars for his role in the Sparticist uprising, Talaat reconnected with Karl Radek (their previous encounter being on opposite sides of the negotiating table at Brest) and frequently visited him with Enver at Moabit prison. Despite his mobility as a fugitive, his exile was one of practical poverty. At one point wishing to start a newspaper, he didn't have enough money to do so, so he wrote his memoirs instead.

Questioned whether he would return and join the Turkish nationalist movement, Talaat declined, arguing that Mustafa Kemal Pasha (Atatürk) is now the new leader. He held regular correspondences with Mustafa Kemal from Berlin. Unlike Enver, Kemal had friendly relations with Talaat, with Kemal addressing Talaat as his "brother" in their communiques. Even though he effectively endorsed Mustafa Kemal as his "successor", from Berlin Talaat was able to directly issue orders to Turkish commanders in the opening stages of the Turkish War of Independence and hoped to use the commander as a puppet. He also kept in contact with Tevfik Rüştü (Aras), Halide Edip (Adıvar), Celal (Bayar), Abdülkadir Cami (Baykut) and Nuri (Conker). The Ankara government sent the ambassadors Bekir Sami (Kunduh) and Galip Kemali (Söylemezoğlu) to meet with Talaat and support his network that assisted the Turkish nationalist movement from abroad. Through these efforts, he cobbled together a disparate coalition of Turkish nationalists, German nationalists, and Bolsheviks.

After the failure of the Kapp Putsch Talaat offered comments in the subsequent press conference, criticizing the putschists for their dilettantism, exclaiming "A putsch without a cabinet ready at hand was just childish."

=== Trial and conviction ===
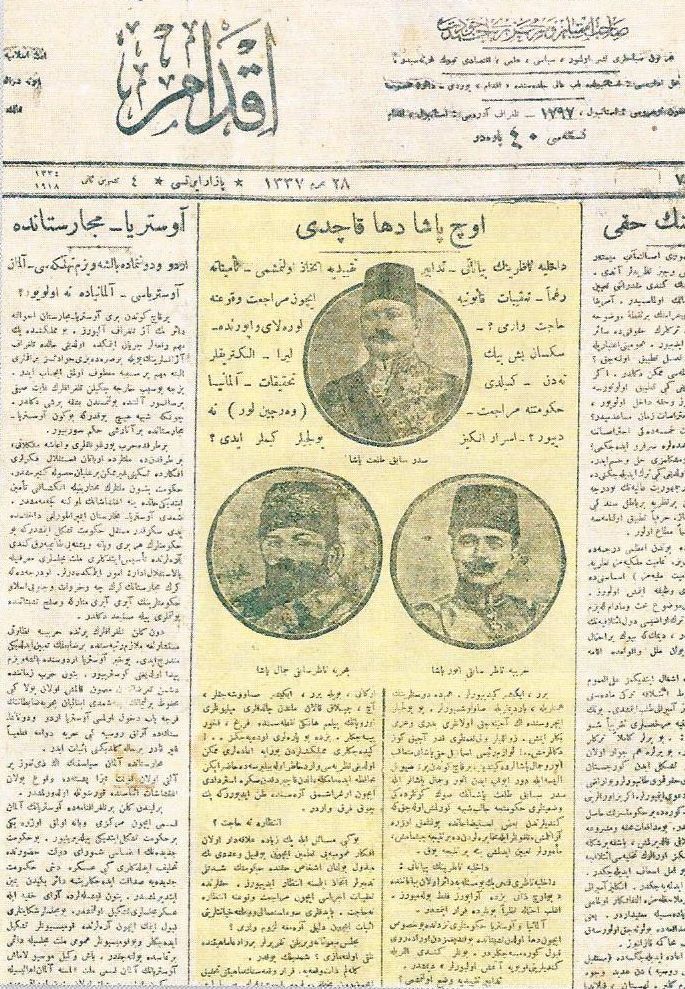
The front page of İkdam on 4 November 1918 after the Three Pashas fled the country following World War I

The British government exerted diplomatic pressure on the Sublime Porte and brought to trial the Ottoman leaders who had held positions of responsibility between 1914 and 1918 for having perpetrated the Armenian genocide. İzzet Pasha was pressured early on by the British to arrest Talaat, but he didn't order his arrest nor order his extradition from Germany until a Constantinople court demanded it. With the allied occupation of Constantinople, İzzet Pasha resigned. Ahmet Tevfik Pasha took the position of grand vizier the same day that Royal Navy ships entered the Golden Horn. Talaat's remaining property was confiscated during Tevfik Pasha's premiership, which lasted until 4 March 1919. He was replaced by Damat Ferid Pasha, whose first order was the arrest of leading members of Union and Progress. Those who were caught were put under arrest at the Bekirağa division and were subsequently exiled to Malta. Courts-martials were then organized to punish the CUP for the empire's ill-conceived involvement in World War I.

By January 1919, a report to Sultan Mehmed VI accused over 130 suspects, most of whom were high officials. The indictment accused the main defendants, including Talaat, of being "mired in an unending chain of bloodthirstiness, plunder and abuses". They were accused of deliberately engineering Turkey's entry into the war "by a recourse to a number of vile tricks and deceitful means". They were also accused of "the massacre and destruction of the Armenians" and of trying to "pile up fortunes for themselves" through "the pillage and plunder" of their possessions. The indictment alleged that "The massacre and destruction of the Armenians were the result of decisions by the Central Committee of Ittihadd". The court released its verdict on 5 July 1919: Talaat's title of pasha was stripped, and he, Enver, Cemal, Nâzım, and Şakir were condemned to death in absentia.

=== Monitoring by British intelligence ===
The British government continued to monitor Talaat's activities after the war. The British government had intelligence reports indicating that he had gone to Germany, and the British High Commissioner pressured Ferid Pasha and the Sublime Porte to request that Germany extradite him to Turkey. Germany was well aware of Talaat's presence but refused to surrender him.

The last official interview Talaat granted was to Aubrey Herbert, a British intelligence agent. During this interview, Talaat maintained at several points that the CUP had always sought British friendship and advice, but claimed that Britain had never replied to such overtures in any meaningful way.

== Death and funeral ==
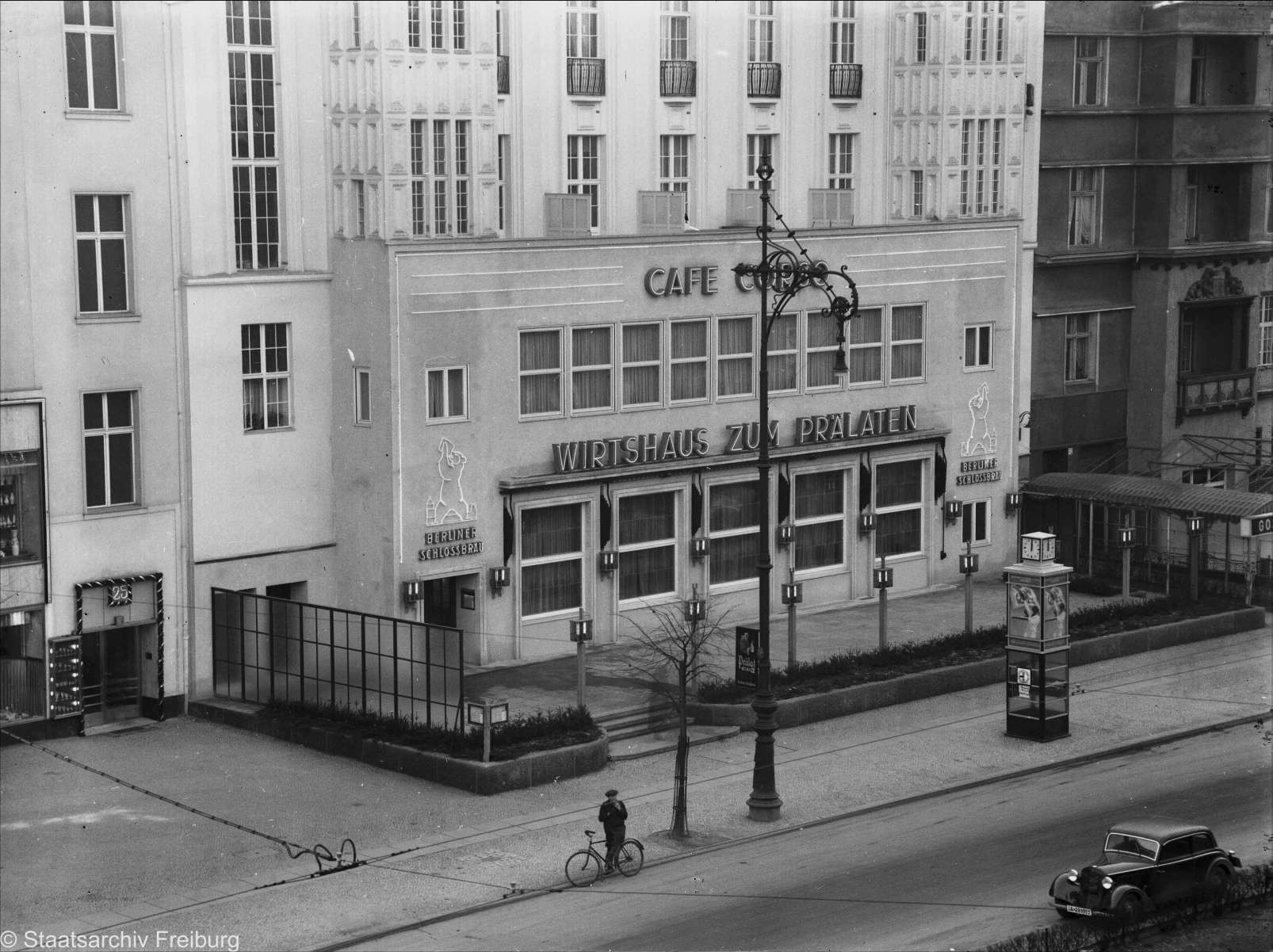
Street where Talaat's killing took place

With most CUP leaders in exile, the Dashnaks organized a plot to assassinate the perpetrators of the Armenian Genocide, known as Operation Nemesis. On 15 March 1921 Talaat was killed with a single bullet as he came out of his Hardenbergstraße flat to purchase a pair of gloves. His assassin was a Dashnak agent from Erzurum named Soghomon Tehlirian, who had members of his family who were killed during the genocide. Tehlirian admitted to the shooting, but, after a cursory two-day trial, he was found innocent by a German court on grounds of temporary insanity due to the traumatic experience he had gone through during the genocide. Immediately after the killing, Nâzım and Şakir, the other two Turkish statesmen who were also staying in the area, received German police protection. Şakir would be assassinated a year later by another Dashnak.

According to Hayriye, Talaat had prophesied his own killing, recalling that he said to her: "One day, someone will shoot me' said he. 'I will collapse, blood spilling from my forehead. I will not have the luxury to die, lying on bed. It doesn't matter; let them shoot me; the motherland shall not be stained with my death. For each Talaat passing away, one thousand Talaats shall come forth (Bir Talât gider, bin Talât yetişir.)' " Mustafa Kemal Pasha remarked, "The motherland has lost her great son; the revolution has lost its great organizer."

Initially, Talaat's friends hoped he could be buried in Anatolia, but neither the government in Constantinople nor the Turkish nationalist movement in Ankara wanted the body; it would be a political liability to associate themselves with the man considered the worst criminal of World War I. Invitations from Hayriye and the Orient Club were sent to Talaat's funeral, and on 19 March, he was buried in the Alter St.-Matthäus-Kirchhof in a well-attended ceremony. At 11:00 a.m., prayers led by the imam of the Turkish embassy, Şükri Bey, were held at Talaat's apartment. Afterwards, a large procession accompanied the coffin to Matthäus, where he was interred. Many prominent Germans paid their respects, including former foreign ministers Richard von Kühlmann and Arthur Zimmermann, along with the former head of Deutsche Bank, the ex-director of the Baghdad railway, several military personnel who had served in the Ottoman Empire during the war and August von Platen-Hallermünde, attending on behalf of the exiled Kaiser Wilhelm II. The German foreign office sent a wreath with a ribbon saying, "To a great statesman and a faithful friend." Şakir, barely able to maintain his composure, read a funeral oration while the coffin was lowered into the grave, covered in a Turkish flag. He asserted the killing was "the consequence of imperialist politics against the Islamic nations". In 1922, the Kemalist government rescinded Talaat's conviction, and then a house and a martyr's pension was granted to Talaat's family with a law passed by the Grand National Assembly in 1926.

During World War II, at the request of the Prime Minister of Turkey, Şükrü Saracoğlu, Talaat's remains were disinterred from Germany and transported to Turkey, where he received a state funeral on 25 February 1943, attended by German ambassador Franz von Papen, Ahmet Emin Yalman, and Saracoğlu. With this gesture, Adolf Hitler hoped to secure Turkish support for the Axis. Talaat's friend Hüseyin Cahit (Yalçın) gave the funeral oration as he was buried at the Monument of Liberty, originally dedicated to those who died during the 31 March Incident. His return to Turkey was welcomed by Turkish society.

== Personality and relationships ==
=== Impressions ===
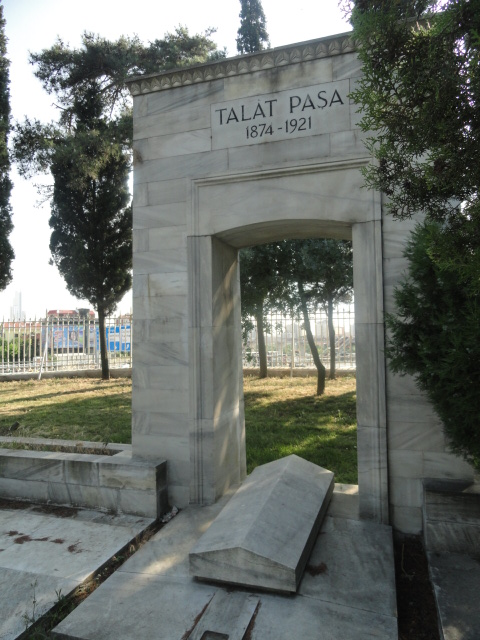
Tomb of Talaat Pasha in the cemetery of Monument of Liberty

Many of Talaat's contemporaries wrote of his charm but also of a melancholy spirit. Some occasionally noticed his naivety and others commented on his intimidation skills.

Mehmed Cavid wrote of the fall of Talaat and the CUP into a delusional "all or nothing" approach for salvation by war via the July Crisis. Krikor Zohrab wrote "[Talaat was] the foremost partisan of war" for "whom [he] and his disciples, this war was tout ou rien [all or nothing]".

Talaat's intentional falsehoods were noted by his countrymen and ambassadors alike, and even some of his close friends (Cahid and Rıfkı) considered him a liar.

Alfred Nossig described Talaat as "The strongest man of Young Turkey", a "man of will", a "unique and outstanding talent of statesmanship" who dominates "the whole state machine". Whereas "the sultan is a constitutional ruler, Talaat is an autocratic sultan." He called him "the Turkish Bismarck" upon his becoming Grand Vizier, a title which German journalist and companion Ernst Jäckh affirmed. Others drew similarities between Talaat and some of his contemporaries, such as Greek prime minister Eliftherios Venizelos and de facto co-dictator of Germany General Erich Ludendorff.

=== Personal life ===
Talaat married Hayriye Hanım (1895–1983) (later known as Hayriye Talat Bafralı), an Albanian girl from Yanya (Ioannina) on 19 March 1910. Talaat met Hayriye in 1909, while she was studying in the French girls' Lycée Notre Dame de Sion in Constantinople. He learned to speak French in the Israelite School at Salonika, and picked up Greek from his wife. They learned in 1911 that they were not able to have children, but they adopted an orphan, Münevver, as their daughter. Hayriye joined Talaat in Berlin in spring 1920 and returned to Turkey after her husband's killing. She remarried with Hamdi Bafralı in 1946, and they had two sons. Hayriye died in İstanbul on 15 January 1983.

Her granddaughter, Ayşegül Bafralı, provided Murat Bardakçı documents from the interior ministry that Hayriye stored away containing data on Armenian deportatation and resettlement of Muhacirs in their place. Bardakçı went on to publish these documents, and an interview with Hayriye 27 years later, in The Remaining Documents of Talaat Pasha.

Talaat Pasha was a member of the Bektashi order and a 33° freemason and first became a member of the Salonica Freemason Lodge Macedonia Risorta in 1903 during his time in the Ottoman Balkans. He was also the first Grand Master of the society. He used both organizations as channels for his anti-Hamidian activism, as they were inaccessible for the spies of Yıldız Palace.

== Legacy ==
Talaat Pasha is widely considered one of the main architects of the Armenian Genocide by historians. Raphael Lemkin, then a law student who followed Talaat's trial, later coined the term genocide to describe what Talaat master minded against the Armenians and Assyrians, and later what Germany committed against Jews.

In his posthumously published memoirs, he propagated a "national myth – that all Ottoman Armenians were rebels, betrayers, secessionists, and that they were responsible for the massacres that took place in 1915–1916". The memoirs were published many times especially when the Armenian genocide was under discussion.

Biographer Hans-Lukas Kieser states that many Jews engaged in "open propaganda for him and CUP causes" despite Talaat's involvement in genocide, and that this continued even after his death into the late twentieth century.

Talaat Pasha is viewed as a "great statesman, skillful revolutionary, and farsighted founding father" in Turkey, where many schools, streets, and mosques are named after him. In Turkey, Talaat and the rest of the Three Pashas are only criticized for causing the Ottoman Empire's entry into World War I and its subsequent partitioning by the Allies. Mustafa Kemal criticized Talaat and his colleagues for their policies during and immediately prior to the First World War.

Kieser writes in his biography of Talaat in Talaat Pasha: Father of Modern Turkey, Architect of Genocide.

The Ottoman signature political animal [Talaat Pasha] held up a distorting mirror to Europe. It showed the worst yet nevertheless real sides of Europe, scaled up. Unconcerned by rules and ethics, arguing that he saw both broken numerous times by the European powers, he began to use the ruthless arms of a comparatively weak actor also wanting empire: extortion and aggression toward weaker ones who could not fight back.

== See also ==
- Progres FC

== Notes ==
Political offices
Preceded by Hacı Adil Bey	Minister of Interior; 4 February 1913 – 8 October 1918	Succeeded by Mustafa Arif Bey
Preceded by Mehmet Cavit Bey	Minister of Finance; November 1914 – 4 February 1917	Succeeded by Abdurrahman Vefik Sayın
Preceded by Said Halim Pasha	Grand Vizier of the Ottoman Empire; 4 February 1917 – 8 October 1918	Succeeded by Ahmed Izzet Pasha
