= Murat Bardakçı =

Turkish journalist (born 1955)

- Born: Murat Gökhan Bardakçı; 25 December 1955 (age 70); Şişli, Istanbul, Turkey
- Occupations: Journalist, economist
- Known for: Musicology, Ottoman Empire in World War I, Decline and modernization of the Ottoman Empire, History of Islam, Journalism
- Notable work: The Remaining Documents of Talaat Pasha ('the Black Book')

Murat Gökhan Bardakçı (born 25 December 1955) is a Turkish journalist working on Ottoman history and the history of music in Turkey. He was also a columnist for Habertürk until it ceased publication in 2018. That year, President Recep Tayyip Erdoğan appointed him to the Presidential Board of Culture and Arts Policies, which was established following the 2018 Turkish general election.

== Biography ==
Bardakçı was born in 1955 in Istanbul. An economist by training, he studied Turkish classical music, including the tambur and singing, under some of Turkey's most-reputed contemporary masters, only to take an interest in music theory and music history later. He published several papers on music history (notably the biographies of the composers Abd al-Qadir Maraghi and Refik Fersan). He then launched into a career in journalism at the newspaper Hürriyet, and expanded the scope of his writing on Ottoman and general Islamic history, with marked emphasis on the 19th and the early-20th centuries. Two of his books on the fall of the Ottoman dynasty, "Son Osmanlılar" (The Last Ottomans) and Şahbaba (The Emperor-father), a biography of Mehmed VI Vahideddin, became best-sellers in Turkey--the former also having been carried over to the screen in the form a TV serial.

He married Ayşegül Manav in 2009.

Since 2008 he has co-hosted the history program "Tarihin Arka Odası" (The Backroom of History) and its successor "Tarihin İzinde" (On the Track of History) with historian Erhan Afyoncu and others, including Turkish art historian Nurhan Atasoy, on Haberturk TV.

In addition to his native Turkish, he also knows Arabic, English, French, Persian and Ottoman Turkish.

== Talat Pasha's Black Book ==
Murat Bardakçı is the editor of The Remaining Documents of Talaat Pasha, known as the Black Book. This is a collection of the Ottoman Minister of the Interior Talaat Pasha recording of relocations of Ottoman Turks and Armenian people during World War I. Published by Bardakçı for the first time in 2005, they were handed over to him by Talat Pasha's widow, Hayriye Talat Bafralı, along with a batch of other documents comprising letters he had sent her and telegrammes exchanged between Committee of Union and Progress members. The Hürriyet reported at the time of its publishing that it exposed the Armenian Genocide.

In response, Bardakçı clarified his position was Armenian genocide denial; he re-edited the work and republished it a year later, adding in the 1915-1916 resettlements of 702,905 Turks from regions under threat of occupation by the Russian Empire as well as 924,158 Armenians, in accordance with the 27 May 1915 Temporary Law of Deportation. He argued that this demonstrated no genocide had happened, because Turks were also relocated.

== Bibliography ==
- Abd al-Qadir Maraghi, Pan Publishing, 1986, OCLC 18557023.
- The Last Ottomans & The Deportation and Heritage of Ottoman Dynasty, Pan Publishing - İnkılâp Bookstore, 1991, ISBN 975-7652-13-X.
- Royal Compositions (The Works of Last Sultan of the Ottomans, Mehmet Vahideddin VI), Pan Publishing, 1997, ISBN 975-7652-63-6.
- Turkish Songs for Fener Rulers, Pan Publishing, 1993, ISBN 975-7652-21-0.
- Sex in Ottomans, Gür Publishing - İnkılâp Bookstore, 1993, ISBN 975-10-2256-8.
- Mr. Refik (Refik Fersan and His Memories), Pan Publishing, 1995, ISBN 978-975-7652-36-6.
- Şahbaba: The Life, Memories and Private Letters of Last Sultan of the Ottomans, Mehmed VI Vahdeddin, Pan Publishing - İnkılâp Bookstore, 1998, ISBN 975-10-2453-6.
- The Abandoned Documents of Talât Pasha, Everest Publishing, 2009, ISBN 978-975-289-560-7.
- Neslişah: Cumhuriyet Devrinde Bir Osmanlı Prensesi, Everest Publishing, 2011, ISBN 9789752899414.
- Ahmed Oğlu Şükrullah: Şükrullah'ın Risalesi ve 15. Yüzyıl Şark Musikisi Nazariyatı, Istanbul, 2012, ISBN 9786054518173.
- Üçüncü Selim Devrine Ait Bir Bostancıbaşı Defteri, Pan Publishing, 2013, ISBN 9786054518531.
- İttihadçı'nın Sandığı, İş Bankası Kültür Publishing, 2014, ISBN 9786053321118.
- Mahmut Şevket Paşa'nın Sadaret Günlüğü, İş Bankası Kültür Publishing, 2014, ISBN 9786053322351.
- Enver, İş Bankası Kültür Publishing, 2015, ISBN 9786053326045.
