= Halil Menteşe =

Turkish politician (1874–1948)

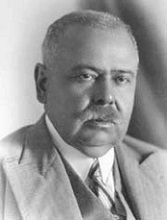

Minister of Foreign Affairs
- In office 24 October 1915 – 4 February 1917
- Monarch: Mehmed V
- Preceded by: Said Halim Pasha
- Succeeded by: Ahmet Nesimi Bey

Member of the Chamber of Deputies
- Constituency: Menteşe (1908, 1912, 1914)

Member of the Grand National Assembly
- Constituency: İzmir (1935, 1935, 1939, 1943, 1946)

Personal details
- Born: 1874 Milas, Ottoman Empire
- Died: 1948 (aged 73–74) Milas, Turkey
- Party: Union and Progress Party

Halil Menteşe (1874–1948) was a Turkish government minister and politician, who was a well known official of the Committee of Union and Progress (CUP). He was the Minister of Foreign Affairs and the President of the Chamber of Deputies in the last years of the Ottoman Empire, and also served as an independent deputy from İzmir in the Republic of Turkey. He was one of the people most directly responsible for the Armenian genocide.

== Biography ==
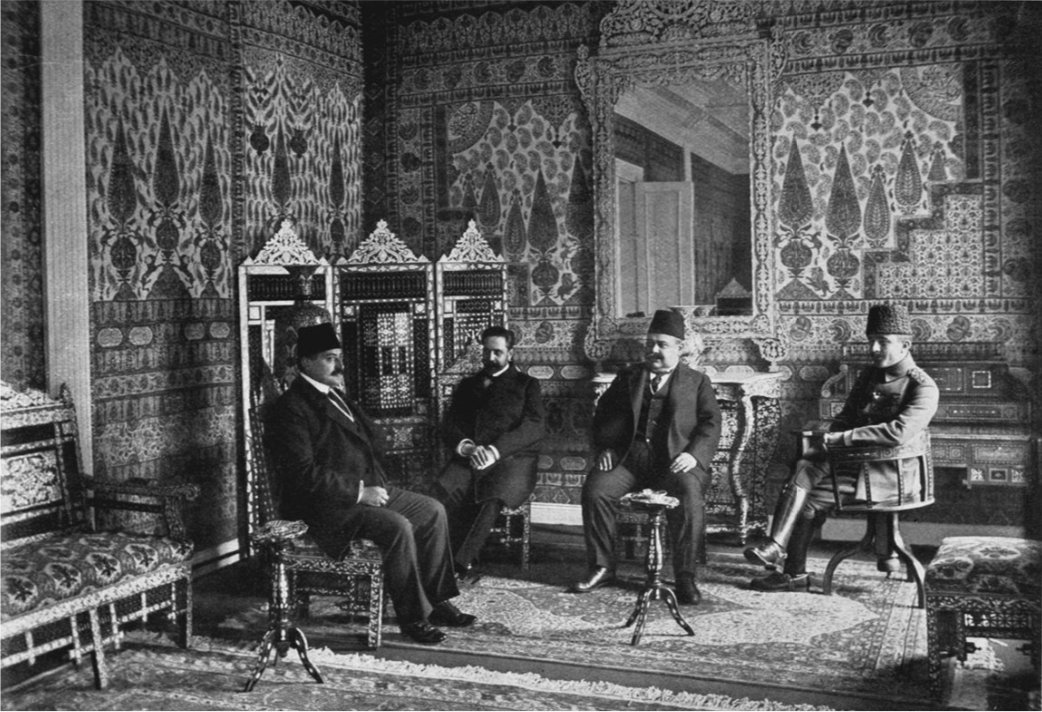
Menteşe with CUP leaders Enver Pasha and Talat Pasha alongside Naum Tyufekchiev, 1915

Halil was born in Milas in 1874 to Salih Efendi and Şefika Hanım but was orphaned at a young age. With his brother Galip, he went to İzmir where he completed his education. Halid Ziya Uşaklıgil was his mentor in the İzmir Lycée, and from there he studied in Istanbul University's Faculty of Law. Fearing arrest by Hamidian authorities in 1894 he escaped to Paris. There he graduated from Faculty of Law of Paris and joined the Young Turks, establishing contact with important members of the Committee of Union and Progress (CUP) such as Ahmet Rıza, Mizancı Murat, and Dr. Nazım. With the death of his benefactor, he returned to Turkey in 1898, continuing an uneventful life in Milas until the 1908 revolution. Halil was elected a CUP MP from Menteşe in the general election for the parliament held after the revolution.

He was part of a commission to liquidate Abdul Hamid II's assets after his deposition. Halil took Talaat Bey's place when he stepped down from the interior ministry on 19 February 1911. He accompanied the Ottoman sultan Mehmed V on his visit to the Rumelian provinces. Halil stepped down from the interior ministry in December, and was elected President of the Chamber of Deputies on 15 May 1912. After the 1912 general election which the committee rigged in favor of itself, the opposition organized a group in the military known as the Savior Officers to shutter parliament. In a session of parliament on 25 July, Halil read to the Chamber of Deputies a death threat from the group, announcing that he was going to continue his position in government. The grand vizier Mehmed Said Pasha acquiesced to the Savior officers, resulting in parliament dissolving on 5 August.

With the CUP being persecuted he once again escaped to Paris, but returned to the Ottoman Empire after the 1913 coup. He was appointed as President of Council of State in Said Halim Pasha's cabinet, and accompanied Talaat to Bulgaria to negotiate a peace treaty to end the Second Balkan War. With a new election held in 1914, Halil resigned his cabinet position to return to the parliamentary presidency. With Enver, Talaat, and Said Halim, Halil was a key player in reaching an alliance with Germany, and with Talaat he traveled to Bulgaria and Romania to ensure they would stay neutral or pro-German in the coming war. Halil became foreign minister in 1915, and also acting justice minister in 1916 before being appointed justice minister in Talaat Pasha's cabinet once he became grand vizier. Talaat reappointed him President of Council of State in his cabinet reshuffle after Mehmed VI's ascension. Halil lost his ministries with the end of World War I and the fall of Talaat Pasha's cabinet.

A special parliamentary committee organized to investigate the causes of the Ottoman Empire joining WWI summoned Halil to questioning several times but nothing could be definitively proved. He was finally arrested on 10 March 1919, and appeared before the Special Military Tribunal that was punishing CUP members and war profiteers. With 78 other politicians and generals he was detained in Malta, being released on 30 April 1921 in a deal made between Mustafa Kemal Atatürk and the British to exchange British POWs for the release of the Malta exiles.

Halil supported the Progressive Republican Party, which was founded in 1924 and banned in 1925. In 1926 he and many ex-Unionists were accused of conspiring to assassinate Mustafa Kemal, though Halil was not charged of any crimes in the end. He received the surname "Menteşe" in 1934. Between 1931–1946 Halil represented İzmir as an independent MP. He retired to his estate in Milas in 1946, and died on 1 April 1948.

== Legacy ==
Academic Ismail Arar calls Halil a quadrimvir of the Three Pashas clique.
