= The Remaining Documents of Talaat Pasha =

Book by Turkish journalist Murat Bardakçı

- First edition (Turkish)
- Author: Murat Bardakçı
- Original title: Talat Paşa'nın Evrak-ı Metrukesi
- Language: Turkish
- Subject: History
- Publisher: Everest Yayınları
- Publication date: 2008
- Publication place: Turkey
- Pages: 272
- ISBN: 978-975-289-560-7
- OCLC: 318327565

The Remaining Documents of Talaat Pasha (Turkish: Talât Paşa'nın Evrak-ı Metrûkesi), also known in Turkey as The Abandoned Documents of Talaat Pasha and Talaat Pasha's Black Book, is the title of a 2008 book by the Turkish journalist Murat Bardakçı. It reproduces in modern Turkish script a selection of documents from the WWI period by Mehmed Talaat Pasha, the Ottoman Empire's Grand Vizier and Minister of Interior, that deal with the relocations of both Muslim Turks and Armenians and the expropriation of abandoned Armenian and Greek property. Its full English title is The Remaining Documents of Talaat Pasha: Documents and Important Correspondence Found in the Private Archives of Sadrazam Talaat Pasha about the Armenian Deportations.

The notebook was handed over to Bardakçı by Talat Pasha's widow Hayriye Talat Bafralı, along with a batch of other documents comprising letters he had sent her and telegrammes exchanged between Committee of Union and Progress members. The book cites the resettlements in 1915–1916 of 702,905 Turks from regions under threat of occupation by Russian forces and the deportation of 924,158 Armenians in accordance with the Tehcir Law of May 27, 1915.

The existence of the original documents was disclosed in 2005 by Bardakçı in the first of a series of articles reproducing their contents in the Turkish newspaper Hürriyet. The first article was published in April 2005, a second in September 2005, a third full re-edit in April 2006, with a fourth appearing in the Turkish newspaper Sabah in February 2007.

== Notes ==
The 1915–1916 resettlements cited in Talaat Pasha's Black Book of 702,905 Turks from regions under threat of occupation by Russian forces and of 924,158 Armenians. The cited figures do not fall in discordance with a February 29, 1916 letter sent to the US Secretary of State from the embassy in Istanbul reporting upon the number of Armenian immigrants (for Syria only).

Bardakçı states that the data in the papers do not indicate that a genocide of the Ottoman Empire's Armenian population had taken place.

According to one Armenian source recalling the 1948 UN Convention on Genocide, the Tehcir Law qualifies as exposing the genocide.

In 2011, the Gomidas Institute published a 70-page English-language book by Ara Sarafian titled "Talaat Pasha's Report on the Armenian Genocide". It contained the population statistics and other data from the Talaat Pasha papers that had been published in Bardakçı's book, with additional analysis that included investigating what sources Talaat Pasha might have used for his population figures. About the "Black Book", Sarafian concluded that its terminology and data should not be taken at face value, but that its existence gives insights into the inner world of the Ottoman government, and that its use of sanitised language was particularly noteworthy.

Murat Bardakçı complained that the 2011 Sarafian's translation into English of content derived from Talaat Pasha's Abandoned Documents was copyright theft, that it distorted his book. The publisher, Everest, sued the Gomidas Institute on August 9, 2011.
