= Malta exiles =

Purges of Ottoman intellectuals by the Allied forces

The Malta exiles (Turkish: Malta sürgünleri) were the purges of Ottoman intellectuals by the Allied forces. The exile to Malta occurred between March 1919 and October 1920 of politicians, high ranking soldiers (mainly), administrators and intellectuals of the Ottoman Empire after the armistice of Mudros during the Occupation of Istanbul by the Allied forces. The Malta exiles became inmates in a British prison where various Committee of Union and Progress (CUP) officials were held in the hopes that trials would be held at the Malta Tribunals at a future date.

== Background ==
In late January 1919, the Allied forces began to arrest CUP leaders and military commanders accusing them of war crimes. On 120 leaders of the Ottoman Empire were issued arrest warrants. These included several high ranking CUP notables such as Tevfik Rüştü Aras, Mithat Şükrü Bleda, Hüseyin Cahit Yalçın or Mustafa Rahmi Arslan and military commanders such as the Generals of the Islamic Army of the Caucasus Nuri Killigil and Mürsel Pasha and Halil Kut a military officer of the Ottoman Army in the Eastern front. Following the occupation of Smyrna by the Greek forces in May 1919, large manifestations in protest occurred on the Anatolian mainland raising pressure upon the courts martial. The judges then ordered the release of 41 suspects in order to calm the situation. The release was not what the allied forces had in mind, causing them to consider a better detention facility than the Bekirağa military prison, were still well aware that the prison might be captured by the protestors and its prisoners released. After this release the prisoners deported to Malta.

The prisoners were deported to Malta on board of SS Princess Ena Malta and HMS Benbow starting in 1919, where they were believed to be held for some three years while searches were made in the archives of Constantinople, London, Paris and Washington to find a way to prosecute them. Most of the prisoners were held for three years on Malta.

Initially, the Allied Government sent sixty-seven war criminals to Malta in a prosecution attempt coordinated by the British forces. Later, more suspects followed. The prisoners were secluded in three different groups.

- A: for people suspected of having taken part in massacres
- B: for people suspected of having tolerated massacres
- C: for people who were not suspected of having taken direct action in massacres

Those exiled included people unrelated to war crimes such as historian Adnan Adıvar, pharmacist Mehmet Eczacıbaşı, journalists Velid Ebüziyya, Yunus Nadi Abalıoğlu, Minister of Education Ahmet Şükrü Bey and Ziya Gökalp, showing the Malta Exiles were focused on purging Turkish intellectuals who would support the Kemalist forces in spite of the Ottoman cooperation with the Allied Government.

== Turkish approach to the trials against the Malta exiles ==
At that time, the Turks had two competing governments, one based in Constantinople, the ancient capital of the Ottoman Empire now under Allied (mostly British) occupation, the other was based in Ankara, deep in the interior and away from Allied forces. The Constantinople government supported the inquiries with more or less seriousness depending on the current government. Nominally headed by the Sultan, the Turkish government based in Constantinople was politically the same state that had surrendered to the Allies at the end of WWI, accepting humiliating terms that included ceding or accepting the occupation of most of what had been the Ottoman Empire, including western Anatolia and complying with the exile of Turkish intellectuals to Malta.

These circumstances sparked a nationalist backlash, leading a clique of Army officers commanding the remnants the Ottoman Army to form a rival independent government based in Ankara. This Kemalist Government was pro-western in overall outlook and did not seek to re-establish the Ottoman Empire but rejected the humiliating terms of surrender agreed too by Constantinople, including the surrender of the Malta exiles. While grand vizir Damad Ferid Pasha (4 March - 2 October 1919, and again 5 April - 21 October 1920) stood behind the prosecuting body, the government of grand vizir Ali Riza Pasha (2 October 1919 - 2 March 1920) barely mentioned legal proceedings against the war criminals. The trials enabled the Freedom and Accord Party to expel the Committee of Union and Progress from the political arena.

The Kemalist Ankara Government was strictly opposed to trials against the Malta exiles and their portrayal as criminals for opposing the occupation of Anatolia. Mustafa Kemal reasoned about the detainees in Malta on the occasion of the congress in Sivas on the 4 September 1919: "...should any of the detainees either already brought or yet to be brought to Istanbul be executed, even at the order of the vile Istanbul government, we would seriously consider executing all British prisoners in our custody." From February 1921 the military court in Istanbul begun releasing prisoners without trials.

== Release ==
The exiled later returned to Turkey in stages during 1921–1922. Through a 1921 agreement made with the British during the London Conference, some of the detained exiles in Malta were initially released. Following the Battle of the Sakarya, another agreement was made with Britain to release the remaining Turkish exiled prisoners in exchange for the Grand National Assembly of Turkey releasing the captive British prisoners. More specifically, the release of the Turkish detainees in Malta was accomplished in exchange for 22 British prisoners held by Mustafa Kemal amongst which figured Alfred Rawlinson, a relative of the British General Henry Rawlinson. Several of the Malta Exiles then joined the Turkish Nationalist Movement around Mustafa Kemal in Ankara.

== Prisoners ==
Malta Exiles
Number	Name	Date of arrest	Arrest ID	Function in the Ottoman Empire
1	Ali İhsan Sabis Pasha	29 March 1919	26 67	Mirliva, former Sixth Army (Ottoman Empire) commander.
2	İbrahim Ahmet	29 March 1919	26 68	Ali İhsan Pasha's order corporal
3	Abdülgani Bey	28 May 1919	26 95	Lieutenant colonel Binbashi
4	Ahmet Bey	28 May 1919	27 24	Former Sivas Governor
5	Ahmet Cevat Bey	28 May 1919	27 24	Kaymakam, Istanbul Position commander
6	Ahmet Haydar Bey	28 May 1919	27 08	Kolağası
7	Ahmet Muammer	28 May 1919	27 19	Former Ministry of the Interior (Ottoman Empire), Sofia Ambassador, Istanbul MP
8	Ahmet Nesimi Sayman	28 May 1919	27 19	former Foreign minister
9	Ahmet Tevfik Bey	28 May 1919	26 80	Kaymakam
10	Ali Fethi Okyar	28 May 1919	26 80	Former Committee of Union and Progress secretary general.
11	Atıf Kamçıl	28 May 1919	27 02	Chamber of Deputies (Ottoman Empire) I., II. Period Kala-i Sultânîye (Çanakkale-Biga) and III. Period Ankara MP
12	Celal Bey	28 May 1919	26 76	Kaymakam
13	Cemal Efendi	28 May 1919	26 94	Mülâzım-ı evvel
14	Ahmet Faik Erner	28 May 1919	27 37	
15	Fazıl Berki Tümtürk	28 May 1919	26 98	
16	Ferit Bey	28 May 1919	27 03	Secretary of Committee of Union and Progress
17	Gani Bey	28 May 1919	27 23	Member of Committee of Union and Progress
18	Habip Bey	28 May 1919	26 85	Bolu deputy
19	Hacı Ahmet Pasha	28 May 1919	27 39	Enver Pasha's father
20	Halil Bey	28 May 1919	26 99	Mülâzım-ı Evvel
21	Hasan Fehmi Tumerkan	28 May 1919	26 88	Sinop deputy
22	Ürgüplü Mustafa Hayri Efendi	28 May 1919	27 34	Sheikh ul-Islam
23	Hazım Bey	28 May 1919	26 78	Kolağası
24	Hilmi Bey	28 May 1919	27 89	Kırklareli Mutasarrıfı
25	Hoca Rıfat Efendi	28 May 1919	27 06	Representative of Committee of Union and Progress
26	Hüseyin Cahit Yalçın	28 May 1919	26 75	Istanbul deputy, Journalist
27	Hüseyin Kadri Bey	28 May 1919	27 05	Karesi deputy
28	İbrahim Bedrettin Bey	28 May 1919	27 01	Diyarbakır Governor
29	İbrahim Hakkı Bey	28 May 1919	27 10	Kolağası
30	İsmail Canbulat	28 May 1919	26 92	Former Ministry of the Interior (Ottoman Empire)
31	Kemal Bey	28 May 1919	Unknown	Unknown
32	Macit Bey	28 May 1919	27 04	The Bookkeeper of Ottoman Divan (parlement)
33	Mazlum Bey	28 May 1919	27 07	Binbashi
34	Mehmet Sabit Sağıroğlu	28 May 1919	26 86	Former Sivas Governor
35	Mehmet Sabri Toprak	28 May 1919	27 29	Saruhan MP
36	Mehmet Tevfik Biren	28 May 1919	26 79	Kaymakam,
37	Memduh Bey	28 May 1919	27 33	Musul Governor
38	Mithat Sükrü Bey	28 May 1919	26 93	Member of Committee of Union and Progress
39	Mustafa Asım bey	28 May 1919	27 11	former Of Mutasarrıfı
40	Mümtaz Bey	28 May 1919	26 97	Retired Yarbay
41	Nevzat Bey	28 May 1919	26 96	Mülâzım-ı Evvel
42	Ömer Bey	28 May 1919	26 81	Kolağası
43	Rahmi Arslan	28 May 1919	26 91	former İzmir Governor
44	Rıza Hamit Bey	28 May 1919	27 40	Bursa deputy
45	Pirizade İbrahim Hayrullah Bey	28 May 1919	27 35	Old Council of State (Ottoman Empire) secretary general.
46	Salah Cimcoz	28 May 1919	27 28	Istanbul deputy
47	Sami Bey	28 May 1919	27 09	Kaymakam
48	Süleyman Numan Pasha	28 May 1919	27 32	Army Medical Inspector
49	Süleyman Sudi Acarbay	28 May 1919	27 30	Tokat MP
50	Serafettin Efendi	28 May 1919	26 77	Mülâzım-ı Evvel
51	Şükrü Kaya	28 May 1919	27 38	Civil Inspector
52	Tahir Cevdet Bey	28 May 1919	26 90	Former Ankara Governor
53	Tevfik Hadi Bey	28 May 1919	26 82	Political Police Director
54	Mehmet Ubeydullah Hatipoğlu	28 May 1919	27 31	İzmir deputy
55	Veli Necdet Sünkitay	28 May 1919	26 87	Undersecretary of the Ministry of the Interior (Ottoman Empire)
56	Yusuf Ziya Bey	28 May 1919	26 84	Retired Kolağası, member of Committee of Union and Progress
57	Zekeriya Zihni Bey	28 May 1919	27 18	Edirne MP
58	Aziz Cihangiroğlu	2 June 1919		
59	Alibeyzade Mehmet Bey	2 June 1919	27 16	
60	Hasan Han Cihangiroğlu	2 June 1919		
61	İbrahim Cihangiroğlu	2 June 1919	27 17	
62	Mehmetoğlu Muhlis Bey	2 June 1919	27 27	
63	Matroi Radjinski	2 June 1919	27 25	
64	Musa Salah Bey	2 June 1919	27 20	Former Minister of Nafia (Ministry of Environment and Urbanisation (Ottoman Empire)), Governor of Bursa, brother of Grand Vizier Said Halim Pasha.
65	Pavlo Camızev	2 June 1919	27 14	
66	Tauchitgin Memlejeff	2 June 1919	27 22	
67	Stefani Vafiades	2 June 1919	27 26	
68	Yusufoğlu Yusuf Bey	2 June 1919	27 21	
69	Abbas Halim Pasha	21 September 1919	27 54	
70	Ahmet Ağaoğlu	21 September 1919	27 64	Afyonkarahisar deputy, lecturer of Darülfünün, author
71	Ali Münif Bey	21 September 1919	27 62	former Nafia Nazırı
72	Hacı Adil Bey	21 September 1919	27 57	deputy
73	Halil Menteşe	21 September 1919	27 60	member of Committee of Union and Progress
74	Hüseyin Tosun Bey	21 September 1919	27 65	owner of Milli Telgraf Ajansı
75	Kara Kemal Bey	21 September 1919	27 61	Old ministry of savings and investment
76	Mahmut Kamil Pasha	21 September 1919	27 58	former 5th army commander
77	Mithat Şükrü Bleda	21 September 1919	27 56	CUP leader
78	Said Halim Pasha	21 September 1919	27 55	Prince, former grand vizier.
79	Ziya Gökalp	21 September 1919	27 59	CUP leader and writer
80	Mehmet Arif Bey	28 January 1920		Kolağası
81	Nuri Bitlisi	28 January 1920		Sergeant
82	Faik Kaltakkıran	22 March 1920	27 80	Old Edirne MP
83	Ahmet Sevket Bey	22 March 1920	27 80	Istanbul Fortified Area Commander
84	Mehmet Cemal Mersinli Pasha	22 March 1920	27 72	Mirliva, Former 2nd Army Commander
85	Çürüksulu Mahmut Pasha	22 March 1920	27 71	Mirliva
86	Hasan Tahsin Uzer	22 March 1920	27 71	Old Damascus and Erzurum MP
87	Hüseyin Rauf Orbay	22 March 1920	27 76	Former Minister of the Navy, Sivas Deputy
88	İsmail Cevat Çobanlı Pasha	22 March 1920	27 73	Member of the Supreme Military Council
89	Mehmet Esat Işık Pasha	22 March 1920	27 75	Doctor
90	Mehmet Seref Aykut Bey	22 March 1920	27 79	
91	Mustafa Vasıf Karakol	22 March 1920	27 78	Founder of Karakol Society
92	Köstenceli Numan Usta	22 March 1920	27 81	Lawyer, Journalist, Edirne MP.
93	Ahmet Emin Yalman	27 March 1920	27 87	Journalist
94	Ali Çetinkaya	27 March 1920	27 87	former Afyon deputy
95	Ali Sait Pasha	27 March 1920	27 82	Mirliva
96	Ali Seyyit Bey	27 March 1920	27 94	Tribal Chief
97	Celal Nuri İleri	27 March 1920	27 85	Journalist
98	Ebüzziyazade Velit Pasha	27 March 1920	27 83	
99	Enis Avni (Aka Gündüz)	27 March 1920	27 91	Writer
100	Hilmi Abdülkadir	27 March 1920	27 89	
101	İslam Ali	27 March 1920	27 86	
102	Mehmet Eczacıbaşı	27 March 1920	27 90	Pharmacist
103	Mehmet Muammer Ira	27 March 1920	27 88	Istanbul Police Director of the Political Section
104	Rafet Pasha (Bele)	27 March 1920	27 92	Gendarmerie General Commander
105	Süleyman Nazif	27 March 1920	27 84	former Musul and Bağdat Governor
106	Acenta Mustafa Kırzade	20 May 1920	27 86	Merchant
107	Abdüsselami Pasha	20 May 1920		Retired General, former Yemen commander
108	Mehmet Kamil Bey	20 May 1920		Musullu Journalist
109	Hacı Ahmet Bey	20 May 1920		Sivas delegate of Committee of Union and Progress
110	Mustafa Reshat Bey	31 May 1920		Istanbul Siyasi Polis Müdürü
111	Agah Bey	7 June 1920	27 86	
112	Basri Bey	7 June 1920		Lieutenant Colonel Binbaşı, Cevat Pasha's Groom
113	Mustafa Abdülhalik Renda	7 June 1920		Former Bitlis Governor
114	Ali Cenani	7 June 1920		Former Aleppo and Antep deputy
115	Andavallı Mehmet Ağa	7 June 1920		
116	Murat Bey	13 June 1920		
117	Süleyman Faik Pasha	13 June 1920		
118	Yakup Sevki Subaşı Pasha	13 June 1920		Former Commander of 9th army
119	Ali Nazmi Bey	6 August 1920		
120	Hoca İlyas Sami Muş	19 August 1920		Muş MP
121	Mehmet Atıf Bey	19 August 1920		
122	Mehmet Nazım Bey	19 August 1920		Commander of the Ottoman Rumelia Detachment (reinforced 177th Regiment)
123	Süleyman Necmi Bey	19 August 1920		
124	Sefer Bey	12 September 1920		
125	Burhanettin Hakkı Bey	20 September 1920		
126	Mehmet Nuri Bey	20 September 1920		Old Elazığ MP
127	Mehmet Rıfat Bey	20 September 1920		
128	Cemal Oğuz Bey	5 October 1920		
129	Mehmet Ali Bey	5 October 1920		Last former Minister of the Interior of the Ottoman Empire
130	Ahmet Sükrü Bey		27 63	Former Minister of Education, Former Deputy of Kastamonu
131	Cevat Bey			
132	Eşref Sencer Kuşçubaşı			Special Organization
133	İsmail Müştak Mayokan			Author, Deputy
134	Kazım Bey			Miralay, Enver Pasha's brother-in-law
135	Mürsel Bakü			Military officer in the eastern front.
136	Sabit Bey			former Sivas Governor
137	Sükrü Bey			Miralay
138	Galatalı Sevki Bey			Miralay, Head of Police Station Association
139	Yunus Nadi Abalıoğlu			Journalist, owner of Yeni Gün Newspaper
140	Velid Ebüzziya	23 March 1920		Journalist of Tasvîr-i Efkâr Newspaper
