= Monument of Liberty, Istanbul =

Memorial in Istanbul, Turkey

- (Abide-i Hürriyet)
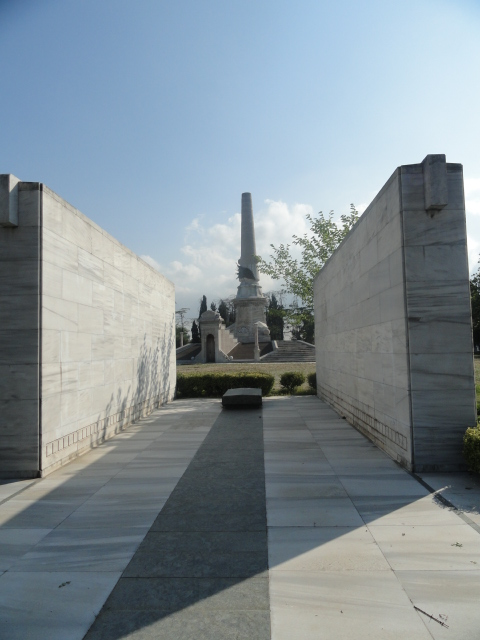
- Monument of Liberty
- Interactive map of Monument of Liberty, Istanbul
- Location: Şişli, Istanbul, Turkey
- Coordinates: 41°04′05″N 28°58′55″E
- Designer: Muzaffer Bey
- Type: memorial and cemetery
- Material: marble
- Beginning date: 1909
- Completion date: July 23, 1911
- Dedicated to: Soldiers killed during the 31 March Incident in 1909

The Monument of Liberty (Turkish: Hürriyet Anıtı; Ottoman Turkish: Abide-i Hürriyet), in the Şişli-Mecidiyeköy district of Istanbul, Turkey, is a memorial in honour of the soldiers killed defending the Ottoman Parliament against rebel forces during the 31 March Incident.

It is situated on Hürriyet-i Ebediye Tepesi (Eternal Liberty Hill), the highest point (130 m (430 ft) above sea level) in Şişli, Istanbul, and lies within a park flanked by three major highways between Şişli and Çağlayan. Pathways radiate out from the monument like a five-angled star surrounded by a circle symbolising the star and crescent of the Turkish flag.

== History ==
In the late 19th century conservatives in the Ottoman Empire were strongly opposed to the Tanzimat reforms (which had begun in 1839) and other liberalisation processes and hoped to re-affirm Sultan Abdulhamid II's powers as an absolute monarch. Abdülhamid had come to power apparently accepting a constitution and had opened the first Ottoman Parliament, the General Assembly of the Ottoman Empire, in 1876 during the First Constitutional Era. Using the pretext of the Russian War as an excuse, that Parliament was adjourned in 1878 and Abdulhamid II returned to reigning as an absolute monarch until 1908, when Parliament resumed its work during the Second Constitutional Era as result of pressure from growing progressive forces.

An uprising that began on April 13, 1909 (March 31, 1325 AH in the Rumi calendar) caused the democratic process to be interrupted once again although the forces of the Hareket Ordusu (Turkish for "Army of Action") that came from Rumelia, under the command of Mahmud Șevked Pasha, suppressed the countercoup on July 23, 1909. Abdulhamid II was deposed by the Committee of Union and Progress ("Young Turks"), the foremost constitutionalist party, and sent into exile in Salonica (modern Thessaloniki), which was at that time one of the largest cities of the Ottoman Empire. The uprising came to be known as the 31 March Incident.

The Abide-i Hürriyet monument was inaugurated in 1911 on the second anniversary of the 31 March Incident. Later, the graves of four notable Ottoman officials, including Mahmud Șevked Pasha, were moved into the surrounding park. Seen today as a symbol of modernity, democracy, and secularism in Turkey, the monument now serves as a venue for some official ceremonies and public gatherings.

== Design ==
The monument was the work of the renowned Ottoman architect Muzaffer Bey, who won an architectural contest. to design it. Constructed between 1909 and 1911 in the form of a cannon firing into the sky, it stands on a marble base in the shape of an equilateral triangle. On each side are carved the names of the soldiers buried there. The monument bears the tughra of Mehmed V Reşad who was sultan when it was erected.

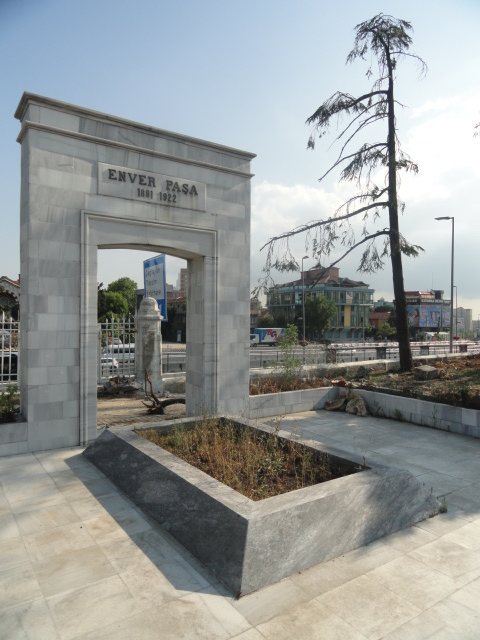
Enver Pasha's grave at the Abide-i Hürriyet, where his remains were interred in 1996.

== Burials ==
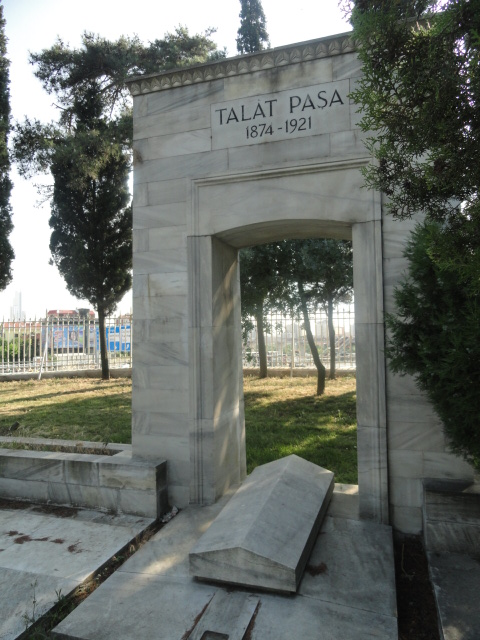
Tomb of Mehmed Talat Pasha

The 74 soldiers killed in action during the 31 March Incident were initially buried in the monument amid state ceremony on July 23, 1911.

Remains of four high-ranking officials of the Ottoman Empire were later buried here too:

- Midhat Pasha, a leading architect of the first Ottoman constitution and Grand Vizier, who died in exile in Taif, Arabia.
- Mahmud Shevket Pasha, commander of the Army of Action (Hareket Ordusu), which put down the countercoup, and later Grand Vizier, who was assassinated in 1913.
- Talat Pasha, former Minister of the Interior and Grand Vizier, who was assassinated by Soghomon Tehlirian in 1921 and whose remains were brought here from Berlin, Germany, in 1943. He was the architect of the Armenian genocide.
- Enver Pasha, Minister of War and deputy Commander-in-Chief of the Ottoman armed forces during the First World War, who was killed in action in Russian Turkestan and whose remains were brought here from Ab-i Derya, today Tajikistan, in 1996

== Meeting point ==
The monument serves as a meeting point for democracy and civil rights demonstrations in Istanbul. For many years Labour Day demonstrations organised by trade unions were celebrated here following the Taksim Square massacre in 1977.

The second mass rally of the Republic Protests against the presidential election took place here on April 29, 2007.

== Logo of Şişli district ==
An outline of the monument is contained in the logo of Şişli Municipality used by the district mayor.
