= Rahmi Arslan =

Ottoman revolutionary

Mustafa Rahmi Arslan
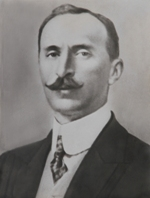

Personal details
- Born: 1874 Selanik, Ottoman Empire
- Died: 1947 (aged 72–73) Istanbul, Turkey
- Party: Committee of Union and Progress

Mustafa Rahmi Arslan (1874–1947) was a Turkish politician, who was a prominent member of the Committee of Union and Progress (CUP).

During the Late Ottoman genocides, Rahmi Bey went to significant lengths to protect the Christian and European populations of Smyrna from deportation, exile and murder; often defying direct orders from the Ottoman Government in Istanbul.

== Education and early life ==
Rahmi Arslan was born into a wealthy family in Selanik and attended a primary school in his hometown. He studied law in Constantinople, but shortly before the completion of his studies, he was arrested and prosecuted for his membership in the CUP, after which he left the Ottoman Empire and went into exile in Europe.

== Political career ==
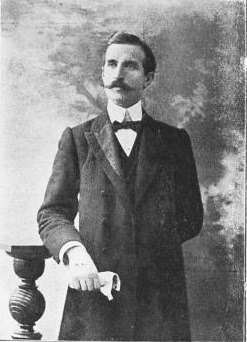
Rahmi bey, 1900s

It was in exile in Geneva, where got to know CUP co-founder Abdullah Cevdet, with whom he tried to establish a Geneva branch of the CUP in the 1890s. By 1906, together with Talaat Pasha and Djemal Pasha, he was one of the co-founders of the Ottoman Freedom Society in Selanik, society which supported the Young Turk Revolution which was being carried out by the Young Turks. During World War I, he acted as the Governor of Izmir, and resisted attempts to Islamize the city, even at great risk to his own safety. He was arrested by the Allied forces in January 1919, and later one of the Malta exiles prosecuted for crimes committed during World War I. Following Arslan's return to Turkey, he was accused of having been involved in an assassination attempt against Mustafa Kemal (Atatürk) in 1926. He then left Turkey and only returned in 1933. When the Turkish Surname Law came into effect in 1934, he took the surname Arslan. He died in 1947.

== Legacy ==
There is a school named Vali Rahmi Bey Primary School, opened in 1956, in the Buca district of İzmir that is named after Rahmi Arslan. The "Vali Rahmi Bey Neighborhood" is also located in the same district.
