= Mithat Şükrü Bleda =

Turkish politician (1874–1956)

Midhat Şükrü Bleda
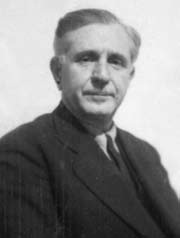

Member of the Grand National Assembly
- Constituency: Sivas (1935, 1939, 1943, 1946)

Member of the Chamber of Deputies
- Constituency: Serres (1908); Drama (1912); Burdur (1914)

Secretary General of the Union and Progress Party
- In office 23 July 1917 – 23 July 1918
- Succeeded by: Nazın Bey

Personal details
- Born: 1874 Selanik, Selanik Vilayet, Ottoman Empire (now Greece)
- Died: 19 February 1956 (aged 81–82) Istanbul, Turkey
- Resting place: Monument of Liberty, Istanbul
- Party: Committee of Union and Progress

Midhat Şükrü Bleda (1874 – 19 February 1956) was a Turkish politician, who was a founding member of the Committee of Union and Progress (CUP), which he also served as its party secretary.

== Biography ==
Midhat Şükrü was born in Selanik (Thesalonika). After graduating from the civil service academy (Mülkiye), he took part in the founding of the Committee of Union and Progress. He served as its general secretary between 1917-1918. He was also a deputy in the Ottoman parliament, representing Serres, Drama, and Burdur in 1908, 1912, and 1914 respectively. Between 1935 - 1950 he represented Sivas in the Grand National Assembly. He died in Istanbul in 1956, and was buried in the Monument of Liberty upon his will.

His memoirs were published under the title of Bir İmparatorluğun Çöküşü (The Collapse of an Empire), which constitute an important source of the Second Constitutional Era. It was adapted into modern Turkish by his son Turgut Bleda (Remzi Kitabevi, 1979).
