= Kara Kemal =

Turkish–Ottoman activist (1875–1926)

Kara Kemal Bey
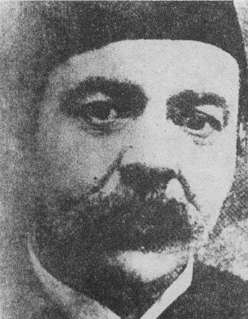

Minister of Supply
- In office 17 August 1918 – 8 October 1918
- Monarch: Mehmed VI
- Prime Minister: Talaat Pasha
- Preceded by: Office established
- Succeeded by: Celâl Muhtar

Personal details
- Born: Ahmed Kemal; 1875 Istanbul, Ottoman Empire
- Died: 27 July 1926 (aged 50–51) Istanbul, Republic of Turkey
- Party: Committee of Union and Progress

Kara Kemal Bey (1875 – 27 July 1926) was a Turkish activist, CUP party boss, and economist. He was a prominent figure in the Committee of Union and Progress and key ally of Talât Pasha. In World War I, using confiscated Armenian property, he helped to establish a bourgeoisie of Muslims at a time when Christians and Westerners conducted most economic activity in Turkey. After the signing of the Armistice of Mudros, he became one of the founders of the Karakol Society, which smuggled weapons, ammunition, and officers in the Turkish War of Independence. After the war, he lead a rump CUP independent of Mustafa Kemal Pasha's movement. In 1926, he was accused of attempting to assassinate President Mustafa Kemal Pasha and sentenced to death.

== Early life ==
Ahmed "Kara" Kemal was born in Istanbul in 1875 as the son of the Telegraph Director of the Secretariat of the Ottoman Sultan, Arif Bey Kısakürek. He earned his nickname for his dark complexion and mysterious personality. The Kısaküreks could trace their ancestry to the Turkish Dulkadirid dynasty. He had two siblings.

== Activism ==
He joined the Ministry of Post and Telegraph as a postal worker, and worked in Istanbul, Edirne, Izmir, Serres, and Kastamonu. In Serres, an important partnership was formed when he met Talât Bey and joined the CUP. He used his position to distribute banned Young Turk literature to Istanbul residents. In 1907 he founded the CUP's Istanbul Branch. Kemal was a regular in coffeehouses due to his fondness of hookah, which led him to develop relationships with the capital's artisans, organizing valuable networks for the CUP in Istanbul. His contacts with the bakers, greengrocers, shoemakers, and boatmen associations -most especially the porters- turned them into street muscle for the committee.

Following the Young Turk Revolution, Kara Kemal worked with the members of the CUP's Istanbul Branch to establish guilds for the tradesmen. The old guilds, whose powers during the 19th century as Turkey integrated itself into the global capitalist order had been lost, were revitalized into modern professional associations and made central to a goal of creating a national bourgeoisie. This process began by taking advantage of boycott movements, the first of which was against Austro-Hungarian and Greek products in 1908, but then expanded to the economic activities of non-Muslims in the Empire.

Kemal attended the 1909 CUP congress at Salonica as an Istanbul delegate. In 1912 Talât supported his elevation into the CUP's Central Committee. Kara Kemal earned the nickname “the Little Master [Küçük Efendi]”, while Talât was “the Grand Master [Büyük Efendi].”

He was one of the organizers of the CUP's 23 January 1913 coup, placing armed tradesmen associates at strategically located coffeehouses to secure the road on which prominent Unionists would take to the Sublime Porte. That day he carried out the takeover of Sirkeci's Post and Telegraph Administration bureau with a posse of henchmen. At the 1913 General Congress of the CUP, the Istanbul Branch under Kara Kemal was granted an extensive autonomy from the rest of the committee, carving out plenty of space to carry out his economic agenda more freely. He also took part in the Board of Censorship. Kemal was a part of the CUP's civilian Turkist faction which advocated for Turkish interests in the Empire over all else, which included Talât, Ziya Gökalp, Halil Menteşe, and Dr. Bahaeddin Şakir.

In the opening stages of World War I, Kara Kemal was dispatched to Trabzon to establish a branch of the Special Organization and carry out guerilla attacks on the Russian army. Not meeting much success, he returned to Istanbul and resumed his project of creating a commercial bourgeoisie composed of Muslim-Turks.

== Economic activities in war-time Istanbul ==
The CUP's economic liberalism of the Second Constitutional Era quickly gave way to state control over the war-time economy. Turkey's economy was highly disrupted as it was now at war with its largest trading partners: Britain, France, and Russia. The Unionists implemented a tight state control over the economy to limit speculation and control prices for expensive goods in demand from the army and civilians. Concurrently, the wartime atmosphere allowed for a persecution of Christians, including a genocide against Armenians, to settle the question over the empire's national identity. The economic part of this initiative was known as National Economy [Millî İktisat].

For Turkish leaders World War I was a good time as any to abolish all capitulation treaties. Kara Kemal was tasked with heading the Special Trade Board [Heyet-i Mahsusa-i Ticariyye], which he founded. The profit from the board was delegated to waqfs which then funded several national joint-stock companies. Economic opportunities were promoted for Muslim Turks in local CUP clubs when previous economic activity was dominated by western capitalists and the Christian bourgeoisie. Well placed business-savvy Turks in medium-sized cities did well with these schemes, most of the population was gripped by price gouging, credit defaults, and famine. Significant unrest was directed against the nouveau riche "Generation of [A.H.] 1332 [1914]". In the 1916 CUP Congress Kara Kemal claimed the allegations of corruption among subsistence contractors were false, and that party members did not make profits from high food prices, rather they were trying to prevent excessive market prices and happened to earn some money doing so. Now turning his focus to banking, the congress accepted his proposal to establish a national bank. In 1917, he and Cavid established the Ottoman National Credit Bank [Osmanlı İtibâr-ı Millî Bankası], and a few other national banks in midsized cities. The success of these financial schemes were due in part from auctioning off confiscated Armenian property to Turkish entrepreneurs.

In January 1917 he was appointed to the party's General Assembly and the 24 member Economic Assembly. The next month he orchestrated Talât's appointment to Grand Vizier.

His economic activity was eventually checked by quartermaster Topal İsmail Hakkı Pasha, which threatened a dispute between the military (Enver Pasha) and civilian government (Talât Pasha), and he was iced out of power for the year. Following the example of other belligerents, the government established the Ministry of Supply in the summer of 1918, and Kemal was appointed as its first minister, he had previously managed the logistics of supplying the capital during the war. However he held this position only two months, as the Turks would sign cease-fire terms in the Armistice of Mudros.

== Turkish war of independence ==
Following the Armistice of Mudros, he stayed in Istanbul when CUP leaders like Talât, Enver, Cemal, and Şakir fled the capital on a German torpedo boat. He founded the Karakol Society with Baha Said Bey and Kara Vasıf Bey. The organization helped to distribute arms, ammunition, intelligence, and recruits for the Turkish National Movement. Kara Kemal's guildsmen formed the core of Karakol, while Turkish-Muslim capitalists, enriched during World War I, financed the Turkish War of Independence. However Mustafa Kemal Pasha, the eventual leader of the Turkish National Movement, remained aloof from Karakol as he did not want his movement to become a Unionist movement.

On 5 November 1918, he was arrested over allegations of corruption while in charge of military contracting of food stuffs, but he was released the next day. On 13 November he was questioned by the Fifth Branch of the Parliamentary Investigation Commission on charges of corruption in rationing and establishing guilds and companies by obtaining illicit profits from government support for certain individuals and organizations. He categorically denied the accusations, stating that "neither he nor his friends had ever put a penny in their pockets."

On 16 March, 1920, he was imprisoned in the Bekirağa Division by the British when they militarily occupied Istanbul and was subsequently exiled to Malta and tried for war crimes. On 6 September, 1921, he managed to escape from Malta with fifteen other exiles, fleeing to Germany first before returning to occupied Istanbul, where he settled in the Mesadet Han. He occupied himself with retaking ownership of his companies, some of whose assets had been transferred to the Freedom and Accord Party by Damat Ferid Pasha's government during his exile. He also had to regain control over leadership of local tradesmen's associations. The exile had done much damage to his finances and street relationships.

He also spearheaded the revival of the CUP in Istanbul, at a time when most ex-Unionists subordinated themselves under Mustafa Kemal's leadership. Mustafa Kemal was known as "Sarı" Kemal (Kemal the blonde), whereas Ahmed Kemal was known as "Kara" Kemal (Kemal the dark/brunette). In this context, he was attacked by Velid Ebüzziya, editor-in-chief of the Tasvîr-i Efkâr, and Yakup Kadri Karaosmanoğlu, the Istanbul press representative of the Anatolian and Rumelian Defense of Rights Society (A–RMHC), founded by Mustafa Kemal Pasha. Mustafa Kemal met with him in İzmit on January 16, 1923. Kara Kemal agreed to subordinate his movement under the A–RMHC and turn a new page of the country's history under Mustafa Kemal.

== Leading the CUP during the Republic ==
Kara Kemal and other non-conforming Unionists like Cavid Bey organized the CUP's final Congress in Istanbul on 12–13 April 1923. A decision was made not to participate in the 1923 general election and support Mustafa Kemal's candidates, though an election program was prepared. Mustafa Kemal rejected the program and warned the Unionists to stay out of politics. Consequently, some Unionists competed in the elections under the Defense of Rights Group list and were elected members of parliament, but a popular revival of the party was met without success. When Istanbul was retaken by nationalist forces in October of 1923, Kara Kemal's assets and activities were left unmolested, though he had been under surveillance from Mustafa Kemal for years at that point.

When Turkey's first opposition party, the Progressive Republican Party, was founded in 1924, former Unionists led by Kara Kemal supported it.

== Izmir plot and death ==
In the summer of 1926 as President Mustafa Kemal Pasha was conducting a nation-wide tour and about to visit Izmir a conspiracy of assassination was uncovered. According to later testimony of the Ankara Independence Tribunal, Kara Kemal, Cavid, Ziya Hurşit, Hafız Mehmet, and others organized an assassination attempt on the president. Kara Kemal was identified as the mastermind of the plot, who hoped to overthrow of the government to return the CUP to power.

In a series of trials the Progressive Party and the Unionists were accused of involvement. On 13 June 1926 eleven individuals were sentenced to death, including Kara Kemal and six Progressive Party deputies. He was a fugitive for a time until a police raid discovered his dead body from possible suicide in a Cerrahpaşa flat. He was buried in Topkapı Cemetery.

Further trials and investigations into the plot lead to the state ruling the illicit finances of his foundations, companies, and banks warranted their confiscation and liquidation. The purges of 1926 served to destroyed any chance for a revival of the CUP for good.

== In popular culture ==
He is the main character of Kemal Tahir's novel Kurt Kanunu, which tells the story of the struggle between Mustafa Kemal's Turkish revolutionaries and the Unionists.

== Sources ==
- Aslanmirza, Burak (2024). "Kara Kemal". International Encyclopedia of the First World War.
- Öğün, Tuncay. Kara Kemal (1875–1926). Atatürk Ansiklopedisi.
