= Ziya Hurşit =

Turkish politician

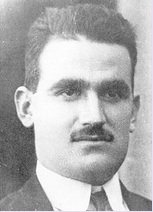
Ziya Hurşit in the 1920s

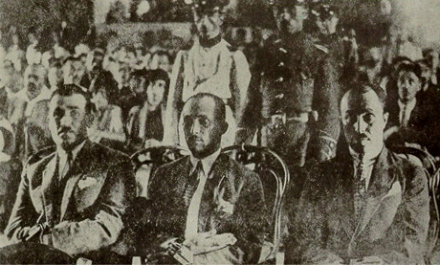
Ziya Hurşit and his accomplices in court.

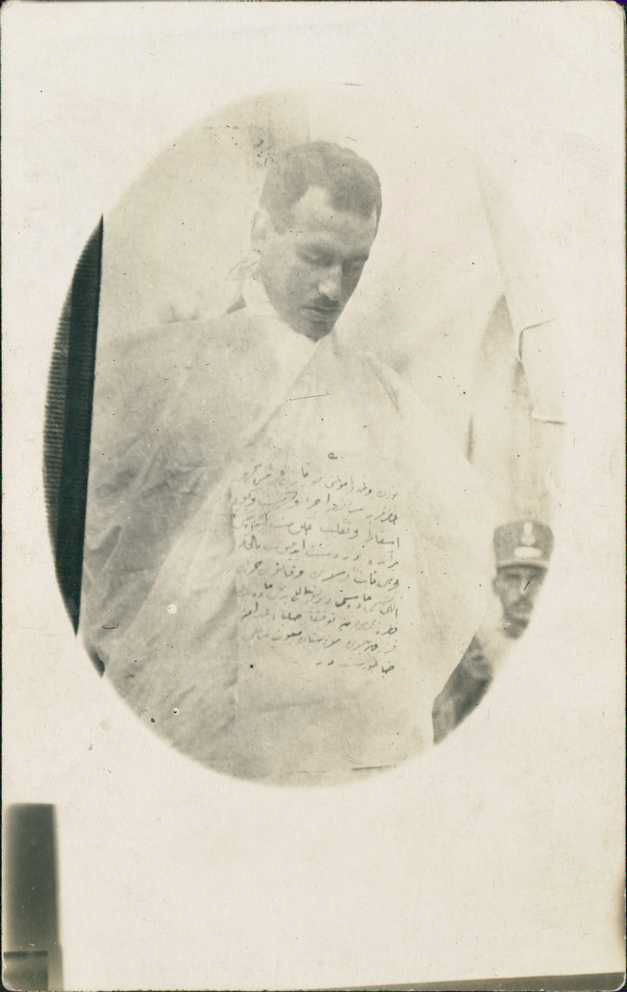
Zira Hurşit photographed after his execution.

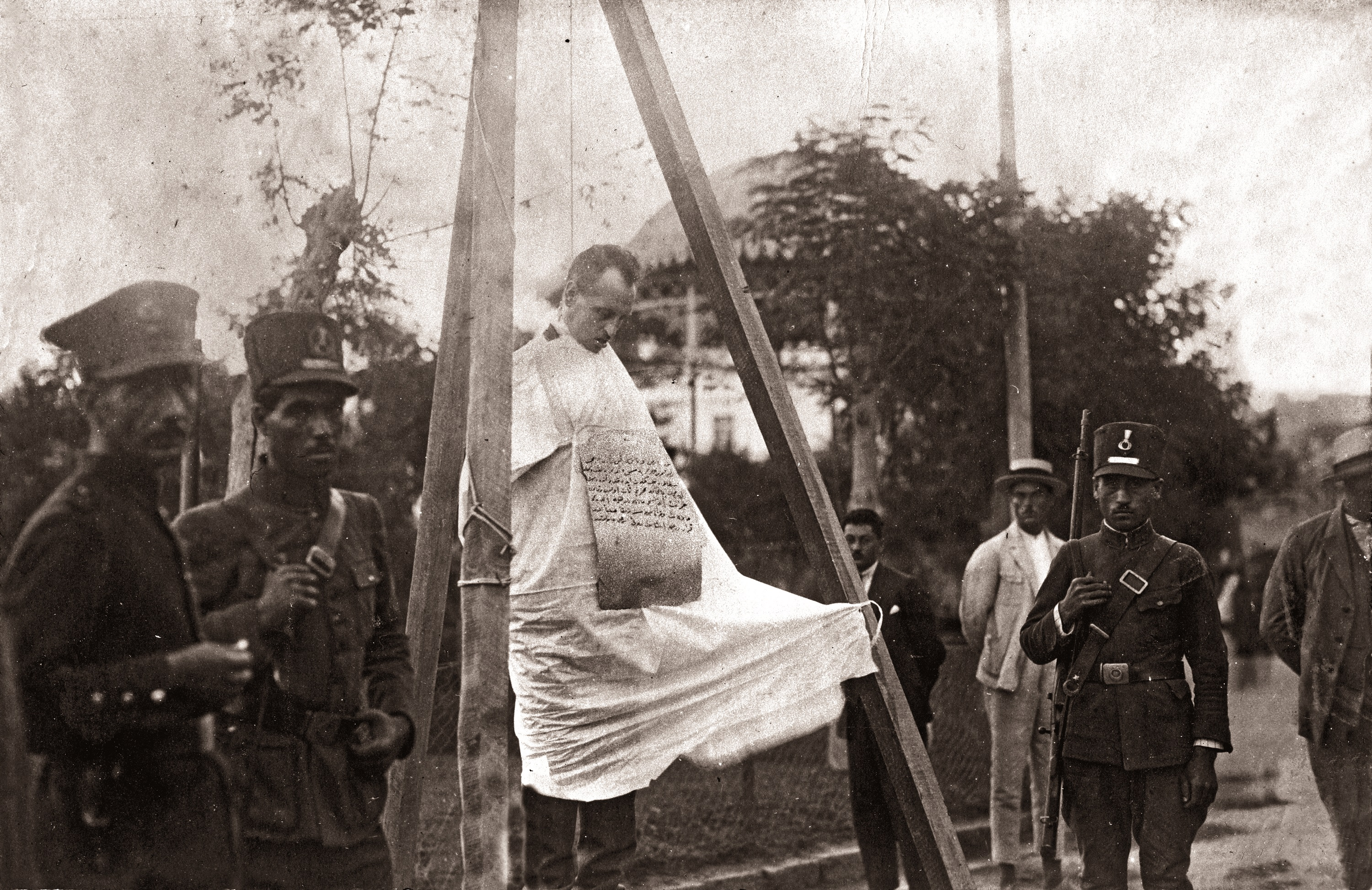
Zira Hurşit photographed after his execution.

Ziya Hurşit Bey (Ottoman Turkish: ضیا خورشید بگ, romanized: Żiyâ Ḥurşîd Beğ; 1892 – July 14, 1926) was one of the first Grand National Assembly of Turkey deputies. He was executed in 1926 for attempting to assassinate Mustafa Kemal.

Ziya Hurşit was born in the town of Çamlıhemşin of Rize Province in 1892. He was a member of Kurtoğlu family. He was educated on ship construction and radio in Gdańsk, Germany. He participated in Erzurum Congress as Trabzon delegate. He fought in Turkish War of Independence as a volunteer. He took part in the 1st Grand National Assembly of Turkey as Lazistan deputy. He had been a member of the Yozgat Independence Court for a period of time. However, his views differed from Mustafa Kemal's. He was unable to be elected as deputy to the 2nd Assembly.

On June 16, 1926, he was arrested for planning an assassination against Mustafa Kemal in İzmir. According to evidence, those who acted with Ziya Hurşit, including Gürcü Yusuf, Laz İsmail, and Çopur Hilmi, planned to shoot Mustafa Kemal dead in front of Kemeraltı prison. Ziya Hurşit and his accomplices, taking advantage of chaos caused, would embark on the boat of the Cretan Şevki Bey, which was waiting in the dock, by a car waiting in the Yemiş bazaar and flee to Chios. However, at the last moment, as a consequence of Şevki Bey's confession and incriminating of the others, Ziya Hurşit and his friends were captured. It was understood that behind the assassination was a group in the Progressive Republican Party, an opposition party in the Turkish parliament. The party was closed down. Ziya Hurşit and his accomplices were sentenced to death, and on July 14, 1926, he was executed with 13 other men, including Laz İsmail, Gürcü Yusuf, Çopur Hilmi, Şükrü Bey, "Ayıcı" Arif, and İsmail Canbulat.

== See also ==
- Ali Şükrü Bey
