= İzmir plot =

Alleged 1926 assassination plot

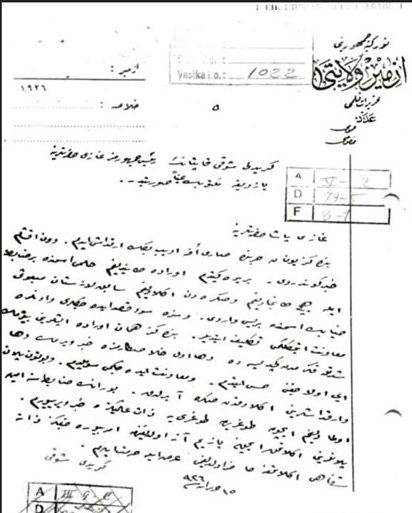
The letter written by Giritli (Cretan) Şevki which uncovered the names behind the plot

In 1926, the Turkish police arrested dozens of people, including ex-ministers, lawmakers and governors, accused of plotting to assassinate Mustafa Kemal, the first president of Turkey, on 14 June 1926 in İzmir. The assassination was planned to take place in the Kemeraltı district of İzmir. As Mustafa Kemal Pasha's car would have slowed down at the crossroads, Ziya Hurşit Bey would have opened fire on him from Gaffarzâde Hotel with Gürcü (Georgian) Yusuf and Laz İsmail throwing bombs and explosives at him from the barber shop under the hotel. Meanwhile, they had planned to escape from the scene with Çopur Hilmi and Giritli (Cretan) Şevki, who would wait in a car on the side street, and then send them to Chios with a motor. However, through the telegram sent to Mustafa Kemal Pasha by İzmir Governor Kâzım Bey on 14 June, the plan was uncovered and the president postponed his trip to İzmir. In the letter written by Giritli Şevki to the Governor of İzmir on 15 June 1926, information on the people who would have carried on the assassination was included. After a while, the four main suspects were arrested and they confessed their crimes.

At the hearings held by the Independence Tribunal who came to İzmir after this incident, it was determined that there were wider opposition groups behind the incident. Of the forty people who were tried in İzmir between 26 June and 13 July, fifteen were sentenced to death with two of them in absentia, and one was exiled. A few weeks later, four of the fifty-seven people on trial in Ankara between 2 and 26 August were sentenced to death, six were exiled and two were sent to prison. A total of one hundred and thirty defendants were questioned, thirty-four of which were released without the need for trial.

Historians Erik-Jan Zürcher and Raymond Kévorkian have stated that there was no plot to assassinate Kemal and the prosecution was a show trial intended to eliminate his political opponents, especially former members of the Committee of Union and Progress.

== Background ==
After the Ottoman Empire left World War I with defeat, members of the Committee of Union and Progress, which was dissolved with the congress organized in November 1918, were divided into several groups. A group started to cooperate with the Ottoman sultan, a group of leaders from committee fled abroad, and a third group joined the War of Independence. The last group, in itself, was divided into two as those who were entirely enthusiastic to establish a national state and those who wanted to rebuild the old system after the victory of the national movement. In January 1922, a series of activities began in Istanbul under Kara Kemal Bey's leadership to reestablish the Committee of Union and Progress. On 29 November 1922, a secret meeting was held in Istanbul under the chairmanship of Kara Kemal with the participation of members of the former community. These secret activities were not terminated after the negotiations with Kılıç Ali Bey and Ali İhsan Bey, who were sent to Istanbul by Mustafa Kemal Pasha in order to prevent re-establishment of the committee. Hüseyin Cahit Bey, a journalist from the Committee of Union and Progress and former Istanbul representative, wrote an article before the general elections of 1923, announcing that the committee would not participate in these elections. Hüseyin Cahit Bey, who published articles on behalf of a dissolved party, was sentenced to life imprisonment in Çorum on 7 May 1925, and his newspaper Tanin was closed on 16 April 1925.

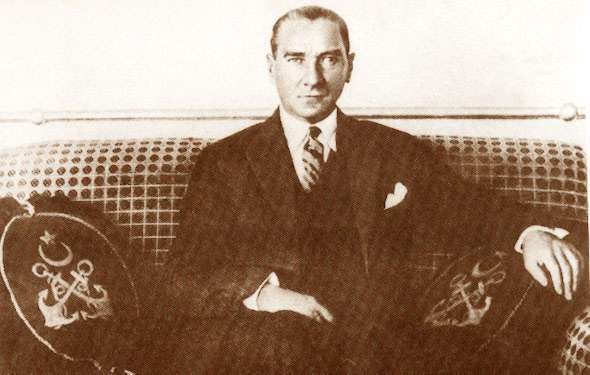
Mustafa Kemal Pasha was off Mudanya with the SS Germanic ferry, which he boarded during his visit to Bursa, on 5 June 1926.

Following the Sheikh Said rebellion against the central government, which was initiated in February 1925 and suppressed in the spring of 1925, the opposition press was silenced based on the Law on the Maintenance of Order (Turkish: Takrir-i Sükûn Kanunu) issued on 4 March 1925, and some former members of the Committee of Union and Progress established the Progressive Republican Party on 17 November 1924. Chaired by Kâzım Karabekir Pasha, the party was closed on 3 June 1925 on the grounds that it "supported the revolt by referring to religious feelings." However, party members, independently continued to maintain their presence in the Grand National Assembly of Turkey. Some members of the former Committee of Union and Progress who did not join the Republican People's Party after their party was closed, remained in Istanbul as a secret opposition movement.

On the other hand, Mustafa Kemal Pasha left Ankara on 7 May 1926 and started organizing train visits to various parts of the country, arriving in Akhisar on 8 May, and later passing through Eskişehir and Afyonkarahisar and then to Konya. He visited Tarsus on 9 May, Mersin on 10 May, Adana on 16 May, Konya on 18 May, Bursa on 20 May, and Balıkesir on 13 June and had planned to visit İzmir on 14 June.

== Leak of information and arrests ==
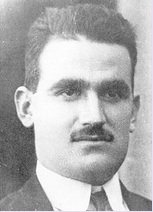
One of the planners of the assassination plot, MP for Lazistan, Ziya Hurşit Bey

During his stay in Balıkesir, Mustafa Kemal Pasha received a telegram sent by the Governor of İzmir, Kâzım (Dirik) Bey, containing the information that he would be assassinated in İzmir. The letter that revealed the assassination plan mentioned in this telegram was written by a biker named Giritli Şevki, one of the individuals who was to play a role in the plan. After spending the night of 15 June in Balıkesir, Mustafa Kemal Pasha came to İzmir on 16 June to continue his unfinished trip and get more detailed information about what happened. On the other hand, on 14 June, Prime Minister İsmet Pasha had learned about the planned assassination through telegrams he received from İzmir. After İsmet Pasha showed the telegrams he received to the prosecutors and judges of the Independence Tribunal, it was decided to arrest all the deputies of the Progressive Republic Party, search their homes and send the found documents to İzmir. The Independence Tribunal delegation arrived in İzmir on 17 June.

The İzmir police soon took action to find the individuals whose names had appeared on the telegraph in connection with the assassination plot, and first caught Ziya Hurşit Bey in the Gaffarzâde Hotel where he was staying, with the weapons and bombs he had hidden under his bed. Laz İsmail, Gürcü Yusuf and Çopur Hilmi were arrested in Ragıp Pasha Hotel and Sarı Efe Edip Bey was caught in Istanbul at Bristol Hotel. On the other hand, before leaving Ankara, the Independence Tribunal delegation had given orders for some members of the former Committee of Union and Progress and all members of the Progressive Republic Party who had stopped appearing at the parliament to be arrested, with the exception of Kastamonu representative Halit Bey. Among the arrested were War of Independence figures such as Kâzım Karabekir Pasha, Ali Fuat Pasha, Cafer Tayyar Pasha, Bekir Sami Bey, Rüştü Pasha, Refet Pasha and former minister of finance Mehmet Cavit Bey. However, Prime Minister İsmet Pasha released Kâzım Karabekir Pasha, who was arrested in Ankara, as he did not believe that he was guilty and that parliamentary immunity prevented such an arrest. During the talks with the Independence Tribunal, İsmet Pasha was told that immunity would not work in these cases, and that he could even be arrested if necessary. İsmet Pasha, who went to İzmir after Mustafa Kemal Pasha, made a statement that he would wait for the outcome of the court. The assassination attempt and the information on the perpetrators who were arrested were announced to the public on 18 June with a statement published in the Hakimiyet-i Milliye newspaper. According to the list given by the Independence Tribunal to the Anadolu Agency, a total of forty-nine people were arrested in Ankara, İzmir and Istanbul in the first wave of arrests. After the initiative was learned by the public, various demonstrations were organized in different parts of the country, especially in İzmir.

== İzmir trials and assassination plan ==
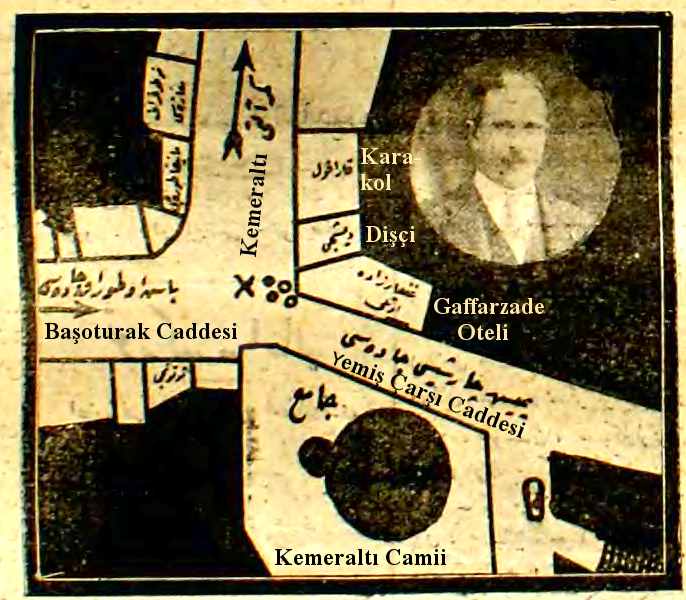
Sketch showing the point of assassination published in Vakit newspaper on 21 June 1926. Today, this point is the intersection of 853th Street and Anafartalar Street.

The hearings started on 26 June in Elhamra Theater. Afyonkarahisar representative Kel Ali was the chairman of the delegation of the Independence Tribunal, with Gaziantep representative Kılıç Ali and Aydın representative Reşit Bey serving as main members, Rize representative Laz Ali as deputy member and Denizli representative Necip Ali Bey as prosecutor. The court was also referred to as the "Court of Alis", since four of the court members were named Ali. The suspects were divided into four groups: those who were directly involved in the assassination, those who prepared and provoked the assassination, the former Unionists who were not directly involved in the assassination but against the Turkish revolution and Mustafa Kemal Pasha, and the members of the closed Progressive Republican Party and the pashas.

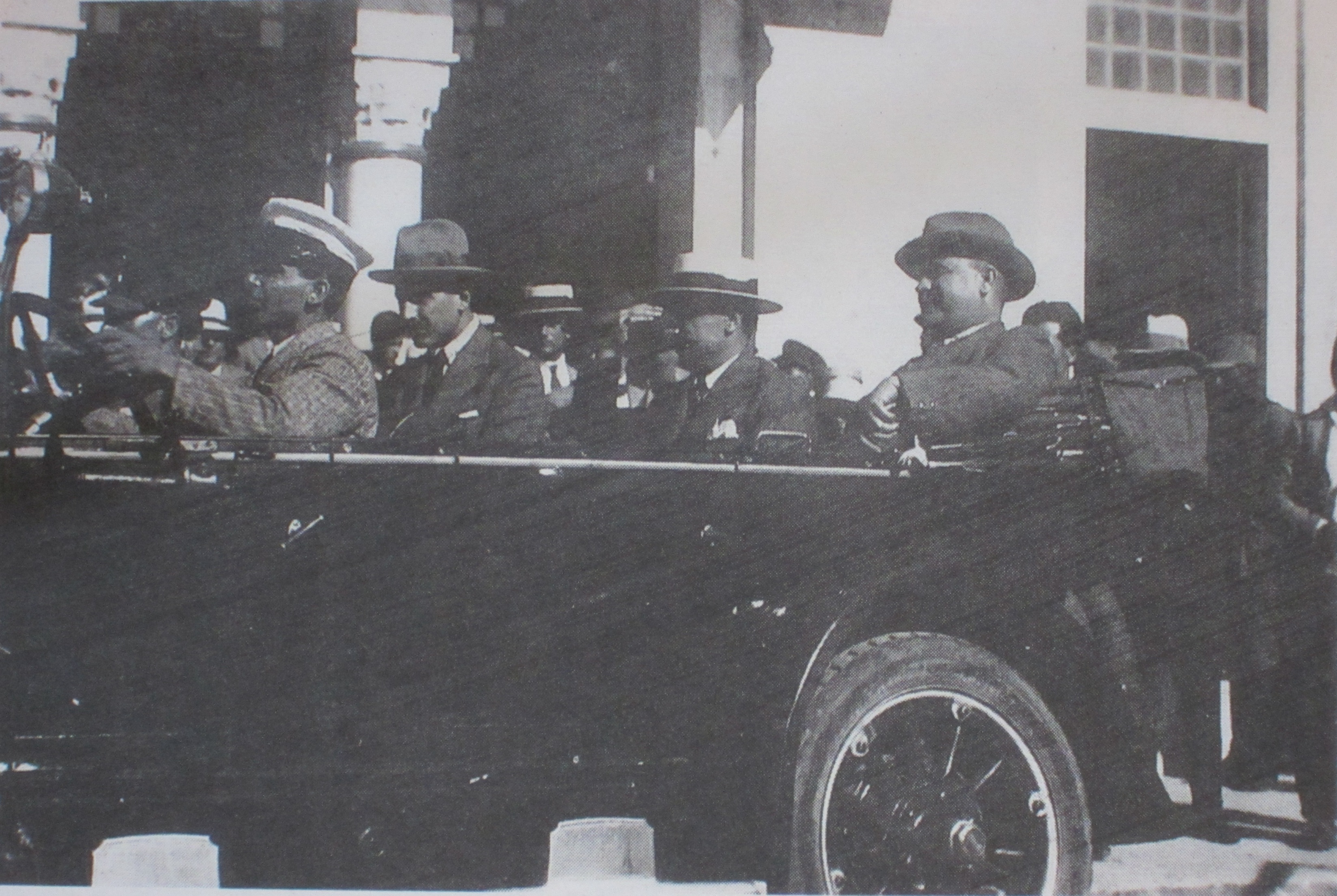
Necip Ali Bey, Kel Ali and Kılıç Ali on their way to the courtroom.

As a result of the proceedings, the indictment put forward by the prosecutor Necip Ali Bey was prepared according to the statements of the accused who gave details about how and when the assassination attempt was planned. According to this indictment, Ziya Hurşit Bey, the Lazistan representative at the 1st Parliament of Turkey who had previously run for a seat from Ankara, Laz İsmail, who was charged with robbery, and Gürcü Yusuf were financially aided by İzmit representative Ahmet Şükrü Bey, after which they moved to Ankara and stayed at the headquarters of the Progressive Republican Party. Later at a meeting at Ahmet Şükrü Bey's house, they first chose the garden on the path of Eskişehir representative Arif Bey's mansion near Çankaya but later considered then the Grand National Assembly of Turkey building and the building where the Anatolia Club used to meet before Ziya Hurşit Bey's brother and Ordu representative Faik Bey was informed about the situation and prevented them from carrying on with their plans. The plan was abandoned after Erzincan representative Sabit Bey also threatened them with a notice. Even though later the assassination was planned to take place in Bursa, this plan was eventually abandoned after Laz İsmail inspected the city together with a woman named Naciye Nimet and found out that it was not suitable for such a plot. Finally, it was decided to carry on the assassination plot in İzmir. Ziya Hurşit Bey, Laz İsmail and Gürcü Yusuf who received the necessary ammunition and money from Ahmet Şükrü Bey in Istanbul, came to İzmir on 15 June with the SS Germanic ferry and started to make the necessary preparations for the assassination. In İzmir, Ziya Hurşit Bey stayed at Gaffarzâde Hotel, while Laz İsmail and Gürcü Yusuf were settled in Ragıp Pasha Hotel.

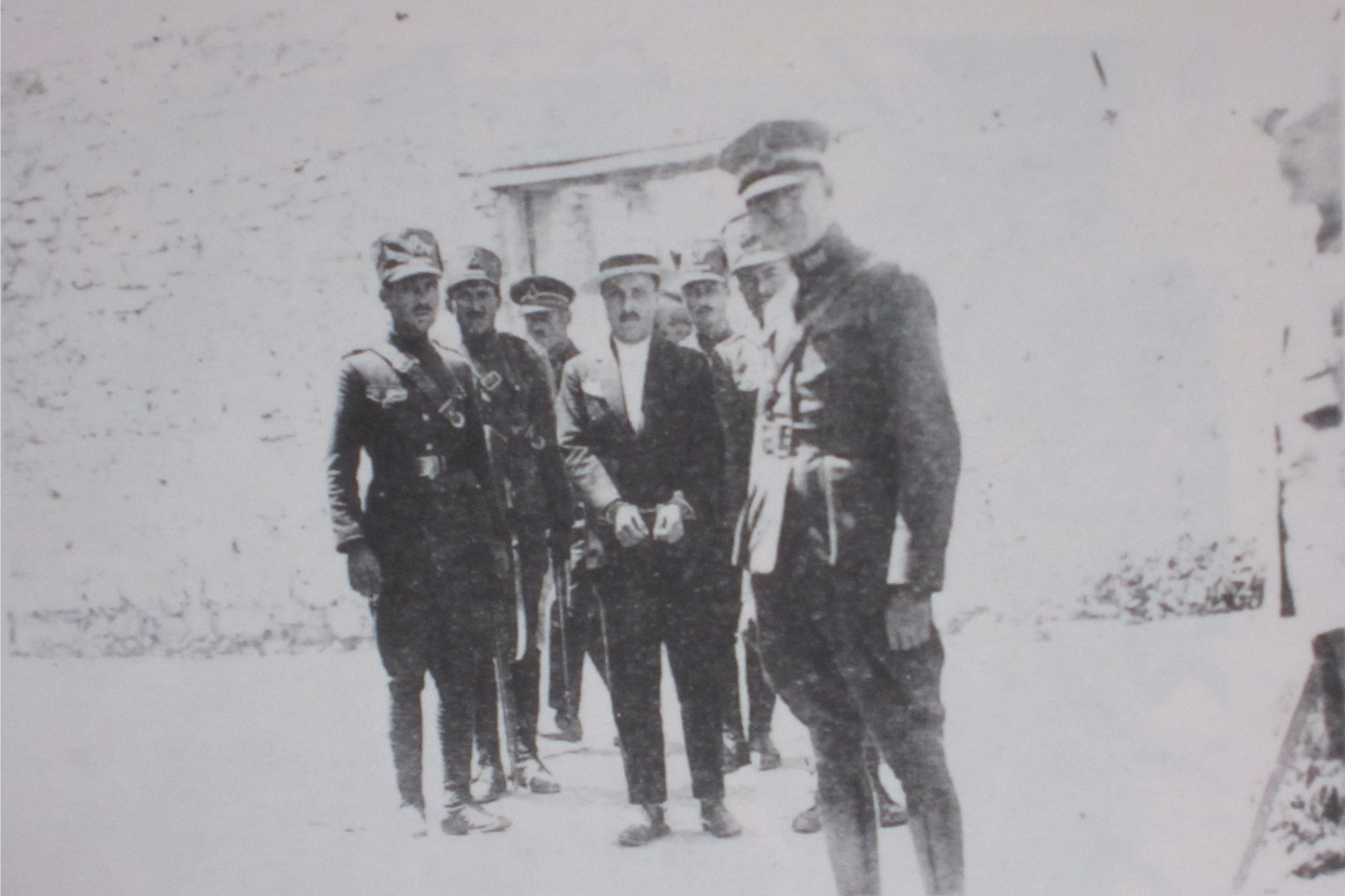
Laz İsmail is shown on his way to court.

Three assassins met Sarı Efe Edip Bey thanks to the letter given to Ziya Hurşit Bey by Ahmet Şükrü Bey and signed by Miralay Rasim Bey. With the participation of Çopur Hilmi, the housekeeper of Sarı Efe Edip Bey, the group gathered first in the garden of Karşıyakalı İdris and then in the house of a biker named Giritli Şevki, to talk about their assassination plan. According to the details revealed, it was determined that the assassination was to be carried out in the Kemeraltı district of İzmir during the visit of Mustafa Kemal Pasha. The car of Mustafa Kemal Pasha, would slow down to turn at the intersection of Baş Durak Street (today's Anafartalar Street) and Hükûmet Street (today's 853. Street), giving Ziya Hurşit Bey, Gürcü Yusuf and Laz İsmail the opportunity to fire and throw bombs at Mustafa Kemal Pasha's car from the barber shop under Gaffarzâde Hotel. Meanwhile, Çopur Hilmi and Giritli Şevki, who would wait in the car on the side street, would have helped them escape from the scene and then pass to Chios with a motor that would be provided by Giritli Şevki. The entire assassination plan was revealed by a letter given to the Governor of İzmir Kâzım Bey on 14 June by Giritli Şevki, who got suspicious after Sarı Efe Edip Bey's departure for Istanbul and upon realizing what the nature of the plan was, decided to inform Mustafa Kemal Pasha through a letter.

=== Inquiries in İzmir trials ===
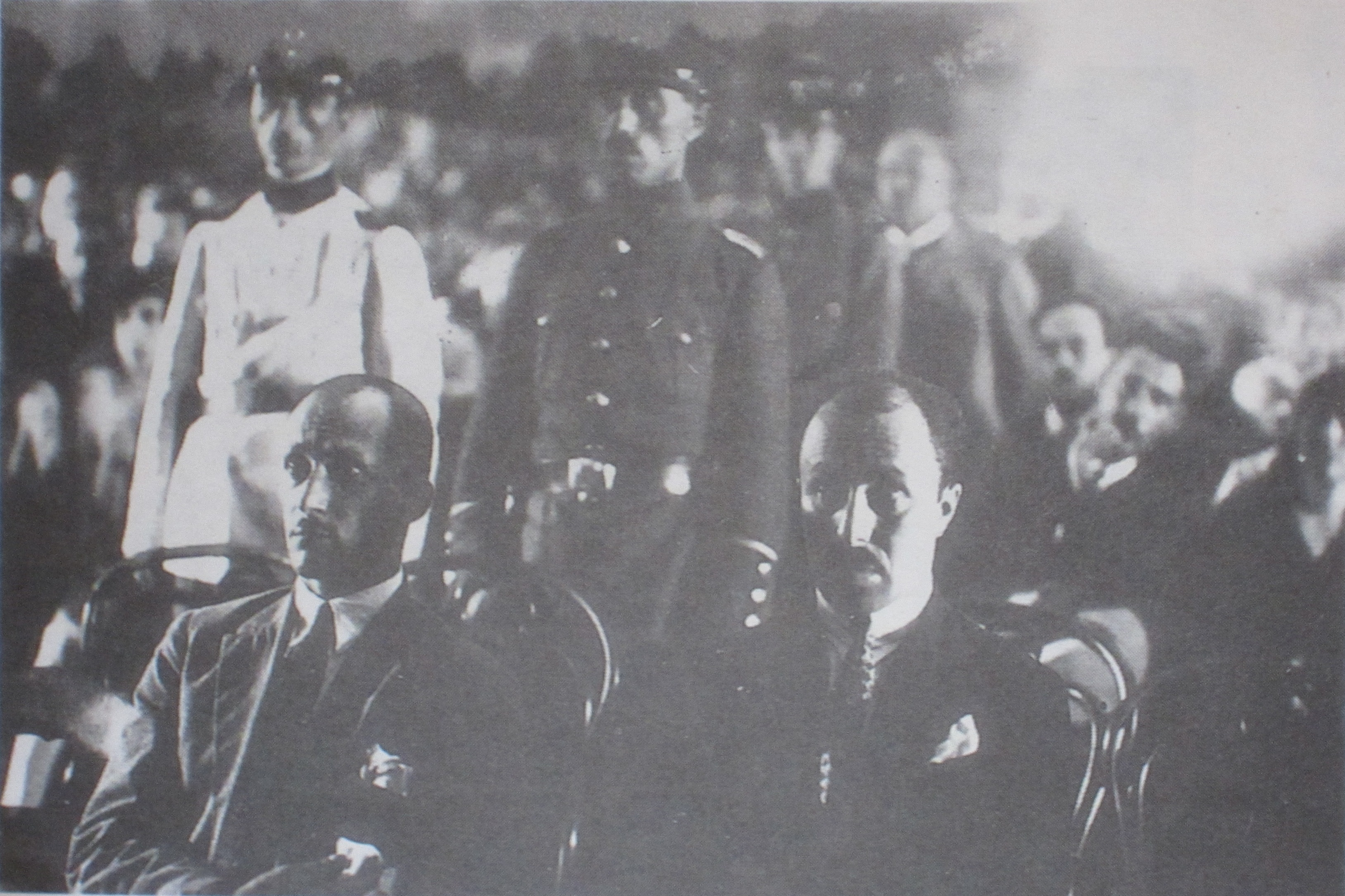
Gürcü Yusuf and Laz İsmail during the hearings.

After the indictment was read, the first questioning session took place with Ziya Hurşit Bey. According to statements by Ziya Hurşit Bey, they planned the assassination with former Ankara governor Abdülkadir Bey. He further added that they had met with the İzmit representative Ahmet Şükrü Bey to support them because they did not have money, and that they had not been able to carry out the assassination in Ankara and Bursa. Laz İsmail, Gürcü Yusuf and Çopur Hilmi, who were questioned later, made similar statements. Sarı Efe Edip Bey, who was questioned after Çopur Hilmi, explained the reason for going to Istanbul the day before the planned assassination, stating that he had intended to inform Celâl Bey of the plan. He said that Ahmet Şükrü Bey had provoked him to join the assassination plot and that he had given him the necessary money. Miralay Rasim Bey and Abidin Bey, who were questioned later, rejected any connection with the assassination plot. With these inquiries, the query of those who were considered first degree criminals in the assassination plot was completed.

According to the statement made by Faik Bey, the elder brother of Ziya Hurşit Bey, Rauf Bey told him that his brother Ziya Hurşit Bey was involved an assassination attempt and upon receiving a notice from Sabit Bey he tried to stop them. Faik Bey also stated that upon his brother Ziya Hurşit Bey's denial of the claims, he initially subsided, but still decided to go to Arif Bey's house in Çankaya and came across Ahmet Şükrü Bey there. Later on, Rauf Bey added that he had also told Kâzım Karabekir Pasha and Rıfat Pasha about the rumors, but that they remained silent considering that these were fabricated. Ahmet Şükrü Bey, questioned after Faik Bey, denied all charges, saying that he had no connection with the assassination plot, that he saw Ziya Hurşit Bey from time to time and that he did not know Laz İsmail at all. Ziya Hurşit Bey was confronted with Miralay Rasim Bey and Sarı Efe Edip Bey after he said that the letter he gave to Sarı Efe Edip Bey was related to tobacco trade. Although Sarı Efe Edip Bey said that they prepared the assassination plan together and the letter that came to him was related to the assassination plot, Ahmet Şükrü Bey denied his claims. Miralay Rasim Bey, on the other hand, admitted that he had written a letter to Sarı Efe Edip Bey at the request of the drunk Ahmet Şükrü Bey. Arif Bey, who was questioned afterwards, said that he briefly met Ziya Hurşit Bey in a casino, and denied the claims that Laz İsmail had stayed in his house. Contradictory to his claims, Laz İsmail said that he was brought by Arif Bey to his home, who took him there with his private car. Despite similar statements made by Arif Bey's driver and servant Ayşe, Arif Bey continued to deny the accuracy of these claims.

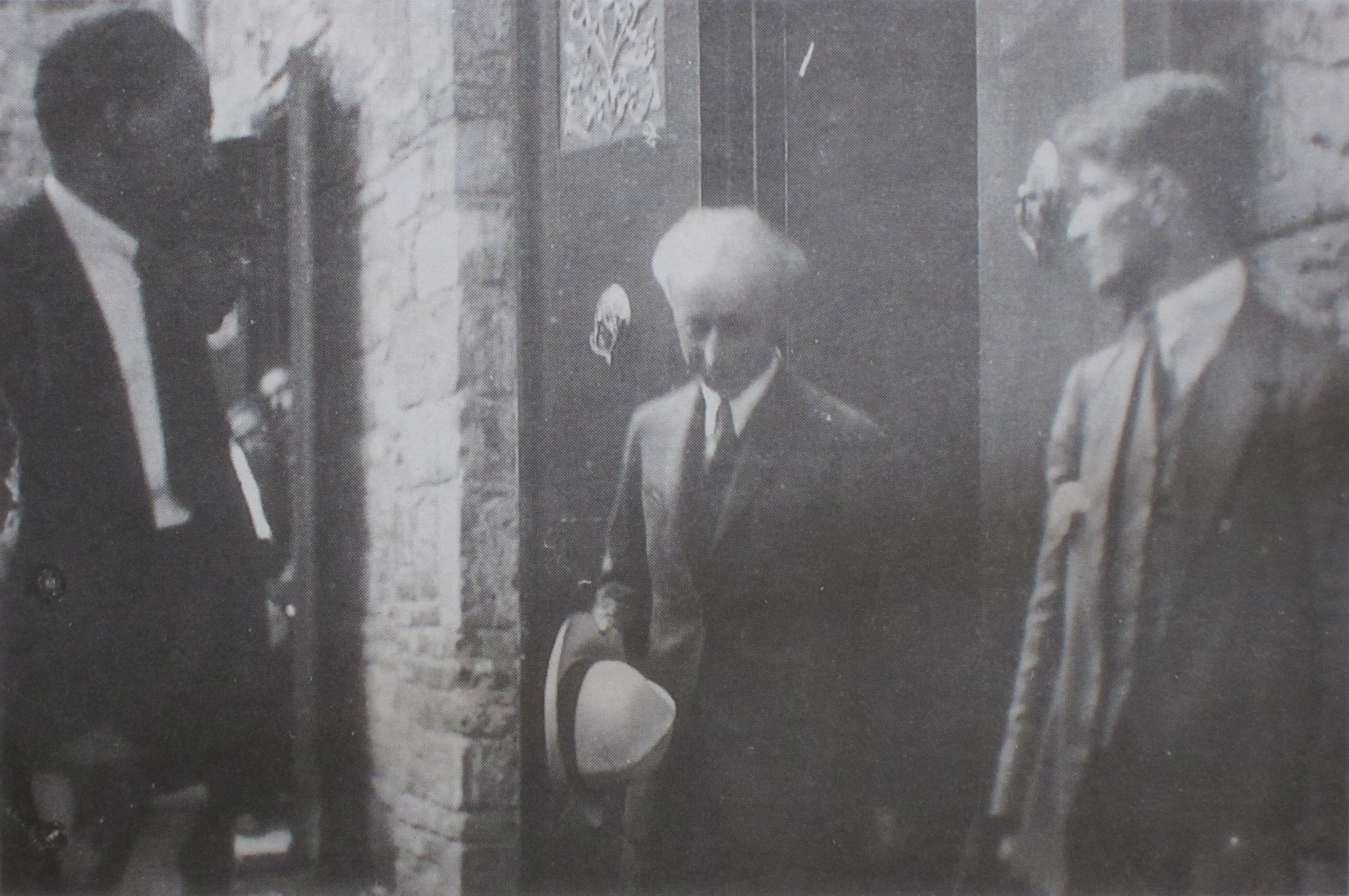
Refet Pasha while leaving the court.

On the other hand, several figures whose connection to the assassination plot could not be proved such as Bursa representative Osman Nuri Bey, Trabzon representative Ahmet Muhtar Bey, Erzurum representative Münir Hüsrev Bey, İzmit representative Mustafa Bey, Kastamonu representative Halit Bey, Kars representative Ömer Bey and Sarı Efe Edip Bey's brother-in-law Doctor Mustafa Şevket were all released.

Prosecutor Necip Ali Bey's indictment, published on 30 June, was mainly concerned with pashas and defendants other than the main suspects of the assassination plot. The individuals mentioned in this indictment were charged for participation in the planning phase of the assassination plot and hiding it despite knowing about it. On 3 July, the pashas were questioned.

Rüştü Pasha, who was questioned again after Sabit Bey repeated his initial statement, said that he had nothing to do with the assassination, adding that he heard about Şükrü Bey's connection with the assassination plot from Sabit Bey, but they later denied any such connection. In his interrogation, Kâzım Karabekir Pasha said that he was not aware of the assassination plot, that those who knew should have notified the government and that even if there were participants from the members of the Progressive Republican Party, they needed to dissolve the party. Ali Fuat Pasha, who was questioned afterwards, said that he was not related to the assassination plot and that he did not believe the conversations on assassination brought up while drinking over table to be legit. Similarly, Refet Pasha and Cafer Tayyar Pasha stated that he did not know about the assassination preparations.

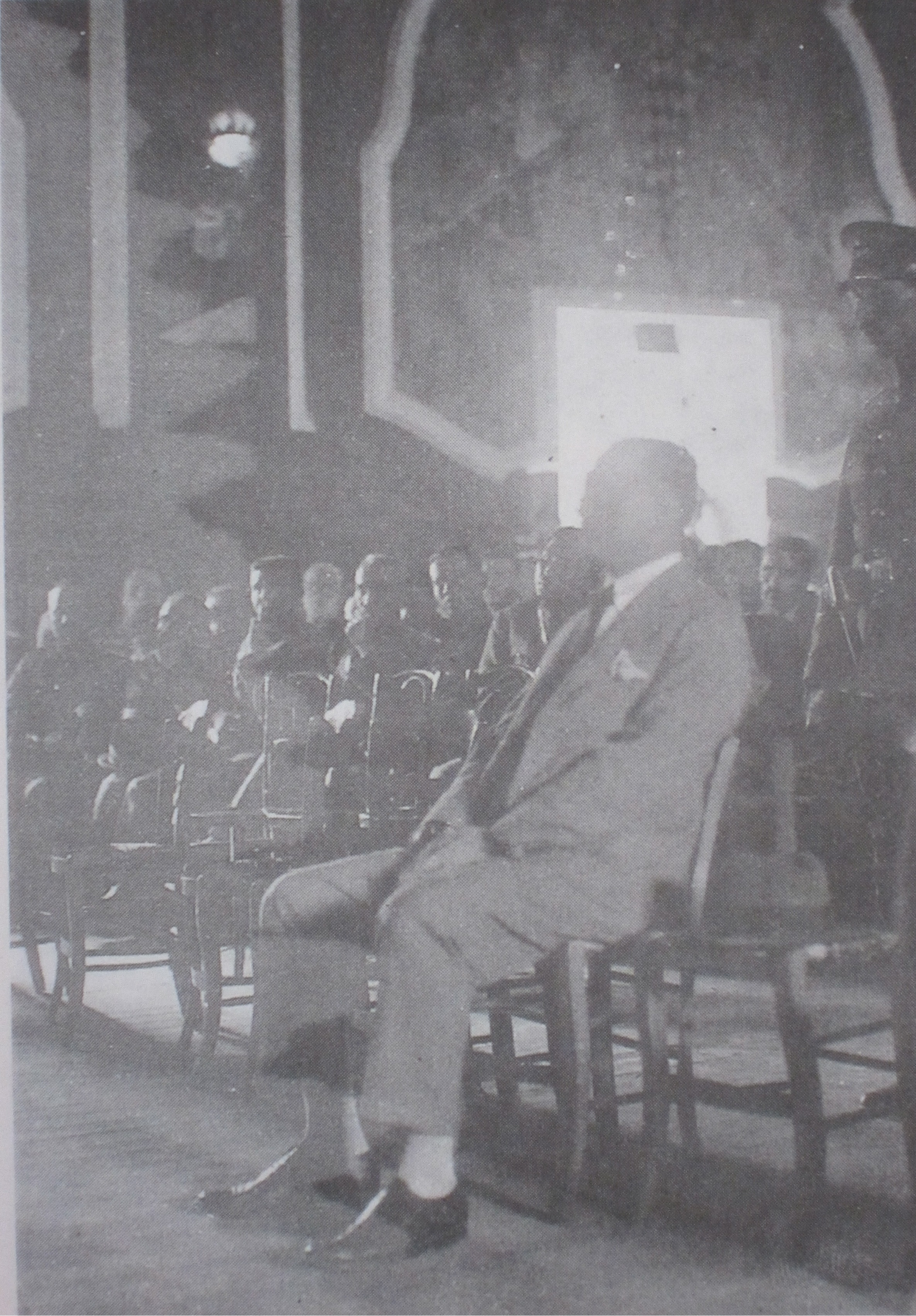
İsmail Canbulat Bey in the courtroom.

Halis Turgut Bey, who was questioned after the pashas and stated that he had nothing to do with the assassination plot, was confronted with Ziya Hurşit Bey. In this confrontation, Ziya Hurşit Bey mentioned that he met with Ahmet Şükrü Bey in Istanbul and talked about the assassination plan and that Halis Turgut Bey did not give him the weapons he had promised to give them. Subsequently, Halis Turgut Bey said all this was a lie. The former minister of finance Cavid Bey, who was questioned on 6 July, denied all of the charges made against him. Following this interrogation, the prosecutor Necip Ali Bey requested that the questioning and trials be continued in Ankara, arguing that the incident was two-faced and included the assassination plot in İzmir and the intention to create a crisis and eventually overthrow the government. Thus, the trial of nine defendants was set to take place in Ankara. Istanbul representative İsmail Canbulat Bey, who was questioned afterwards, said that the meeting held at Cavid Bey's house was about the offer to be given to Mustafa Kemal Pasha, and that the next meeting was organized to learn about the details of the meeting of Kara Kemal Bey with Mustafa Kemal Pasha and he was not aware of the assassination. On 8 July, Prosecutor Necip Ali Bey requested that Tokat representative Bekir Sami Bey, Afyonkarahisar representative Kâmil Bey, Dersim representative Feridun Fikri Bey, Mersin representative Besim Bey, former Erzurum representative Necati Bey, Gaziantep representative Hafız Mehmet Bey, former Sivas representative Kara Vasıf Bey and former Isparta representative Cemal Pasha, who gathered at the house of Refet Pasha after hearing about the assassination attempt, to be questioned as well as Rauf Bey, Istanbul representative Adnan Bey and former İzmir governor Rahmi Bey, who were claimed to have gone to Europe after preparing the initial stages of the event, to be tried in absentia. After this request, the questioning of these people was started.

Speaking after Bekir Sami Bey, Feridun Fikri Bey said that he was an old man with no ambitions, adding that their meeting had no specific purpose and that they discussed the arrest of Ahmet Şükrü Bey despite the fact that he was an MP. After Besim Bey, Gümüşhane representative Zeki Bey and Canik representative Ahmet Nafiz Bey denied any connection with the assassination plot, the questioning of Mersin representative Selâhattin Bey started. Defending the idea that there can be no democracy without an opposition party, Selâhattin Bey stated that his relationship with Kara Kemal Bey was only to take advantage of his political experience. Hüseyin Avni Bey, a former Erzurum representative, said that he had attended the Progressive Republican Party meetings because he found them suitable for his program, adding that he had met with the Unionists only for information and that he had not been informed about the assassination issue in that time. Confessing that he was related to the incident, Hafız Mehmet Bey stated that, on the day when he met Ziya Hurşit Bey, Sabit Bey, Rauf Bey and Halis Turgut Bey also helped them with the planning.

The indictment, which was read by the prosecutor Necip Ali Bey on 11 July, alleged that Ali Fuat Bey and his friends were informed about the assassination and that only Sabit Bey was trying to prevent the assassination attempt planned in Ankara. Ahmet Şükrü Bey, Miralay Rasim Bey, Ziya Hurşit Bey, Laz İsmail, Gürcü Yusuf, Çopur Hilmi, Hafız Mehmet Bey, Kara Kemal Bey and Abdülkadir Bey were given death sentences, while Halis Turgut Bey, İsmail Canbulat Bey, Rahmi Bey, Sürmeneli Vahap, Adnan Bey, Rauf Bey and Rüştü Pasha were convicted with hard labor. Kâzım Karabekir Pasha, Cafer Tayyar Pasha, Ali Fuat Paşa, Refet Pasha, Cemal Pasha, Sabit Bey, Münir Hüsrev Bey, Faik Bey, Bekir Sami Bey, Kâmil Bey, Zeki Bey, Besim Bey, Feridun Fikri Bey, Halit Bey, and Necati Bey were acquitted in the indictment.

=== Pleas made in İzmir trials ===
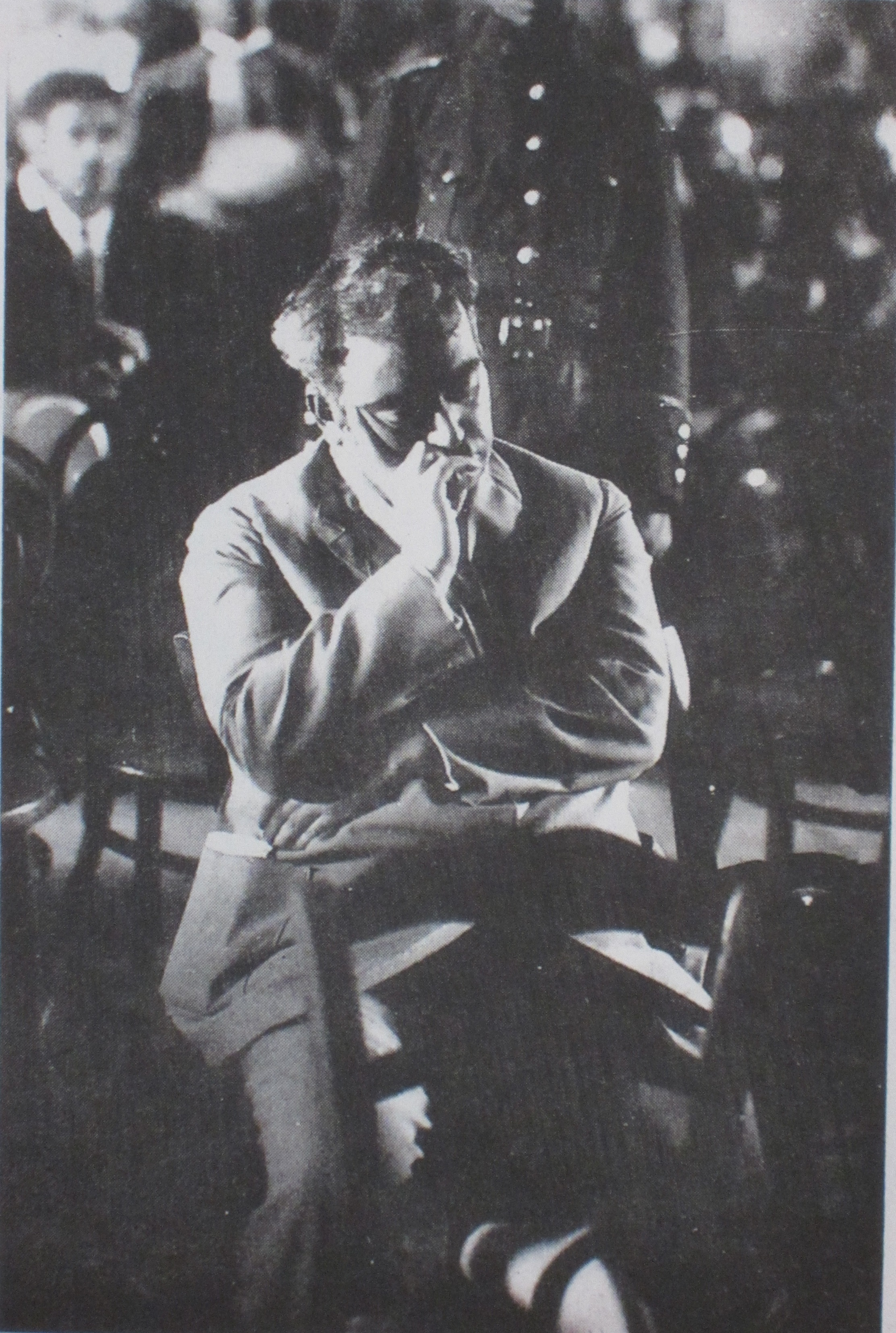
Abidin Bey during the hearings

Following the interrogations and the release of indictment, the defendants were brought to the courtroom on 12 June to make their pleas. While Ziya Hurşit Bey, who made his plea first, admitted that he planned the assassination and intended to put this plan into practice, he said that he should be sentenced to exile in accordance with the 46th article of the Turkish Criminal Code as he refused the accusations regarding his intention to change the constitution and overthrow the government. Although he stated that he had participated in the assassination attempt, Sarı Efe Edip Bey denied his guilt and said that he would have come to Istanbul in order to notify Celâl Bey of the assassination plan and asked for this situation to be taken into consideration while he was being sentenced. Gürcü Yusuf and Laz İsmail demanded that they be forgiven, claiming they were ignorant and deceived. Çopur Hilmi demanded that his sentence be alleviated by stating that he considered the assassination attempt first as a service to country, but he was not a man who would ultimately get involved in such things and wanted to inform the authorities about the plan but Giritli Şevki had acted before him. Ahmet Şükrü Bey stated that the allegations were unfounded and said that a man like himself would not have assassinated anyone. Rejecting all the charges against him, Arif Bey argued that he was not aware of the assassination meetings, that Laz İsmail did not stay in his own home and that his driver and servant made false statements about it. Saying that he was innocent and did not interfere with anything, Abidin Bey said that he did not give away the money he was asked for and that he did not remember the conversations with Rüştü Pasha as he was sick at the time. Hafız Mehmet Bey stated that he was involved in the assassination plot at first, but later he gave up on it and was not guilty. While Miralay Rasim Bey did not provide any additional defense, Sürmeneli Vahap refused to accept the charges, stating that he had gone to his uncle Hafız Mehmet Bey to help him find a job, and his uncle had eventually sent him to Ziya Hurşit Bey and that he had not understood anything said to him because he was an ignorant person. Saying that he did not know why the meeting was held in his garden in Karşıyaka, İdris said that Naciye Nimet Hanım, İsmail Canbulat Bey and Halis Turgut Bey were not guilty. Rüştü Pasha, who did not make any pleas, took refuge in the court's "fairness and justice". Kâzım Karabekir Pasha, Ali Fuat Pasha, Refet Pasha, Cafer Tayyar Pasha and Bekir Sami Bey stated that they would not defend themselves.

=== Results of İzmir trials ===
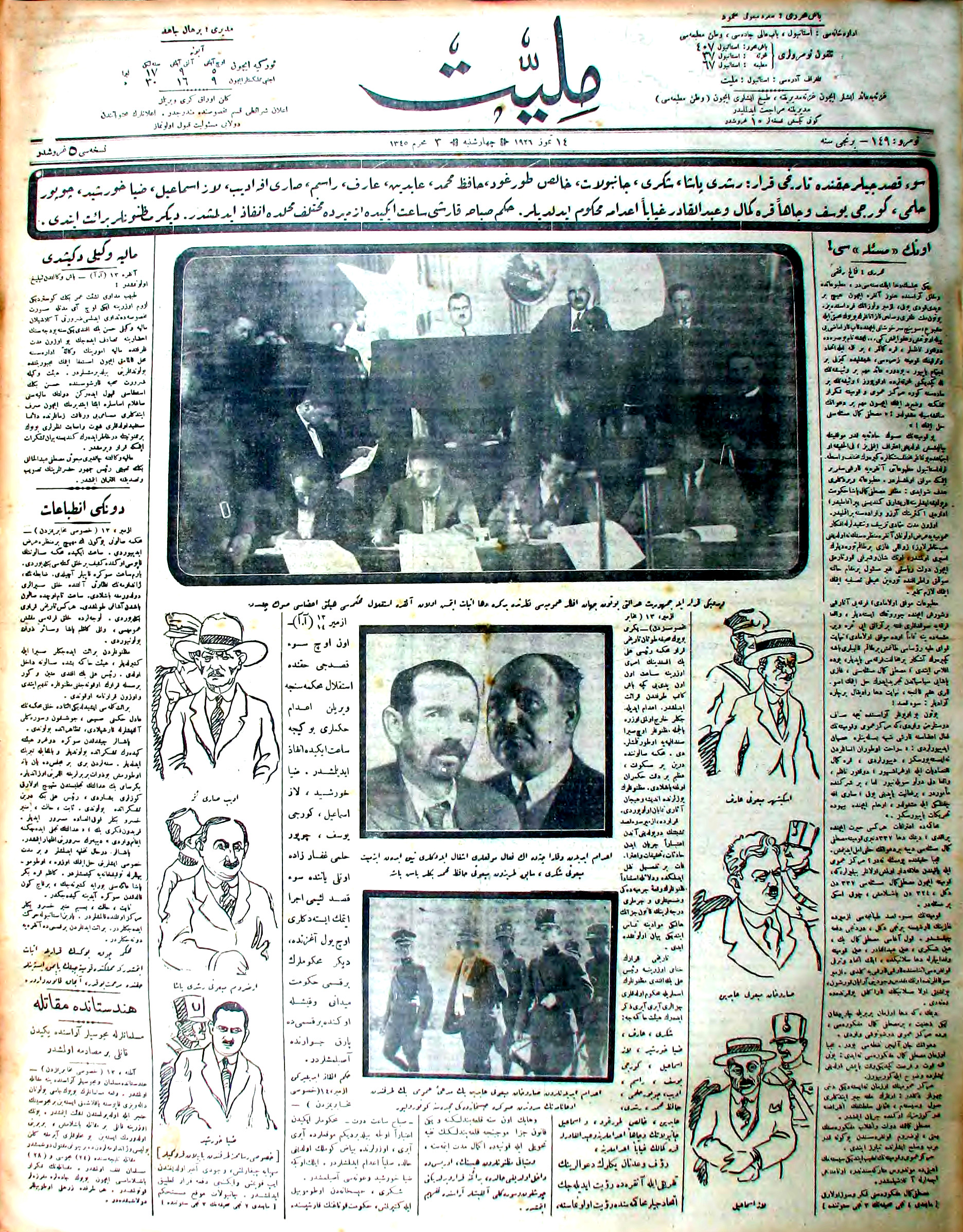
The news about the results of the İzmir trials on the first page of Milliyet newspaper on 14 July 1926.

İzmir trials ended on 13 July 1926. Of the 49 people on trial, fifteen people, who were directly involved in the assassination preparations and who were aware of these plans and did not report to the official authorities, were executed. One person was sentenced to 10 years of confinement in a fortress but was eventually exiled to Konya. Nine people were not tried in İzmir and were instead sent to Ankara to be tried alongside the Unionists. The remaining twenty-four people were acquitted. However, Abdülkadir Bey, who did not attend the court and was sentenced to death in absentia, was caught while he was about to flee to Bulgaria and it was later decided that he would be tried in Ankara. Kara Kemal Bey, who did not attend the hearings, committed suicide when he was about to be arrested on 27 July in Istanbul. Executions were carried out in various parts of İzmir between late 13 July and early 14 July. After the executions, the bodies were first taken to the Central Hospital, and after their belongings were taken, they were buried in the Kokluca Cemetery near Kadifekale. The detainees and the decisions taken against them during the hearings in İzmir are as follows:

Death sentences

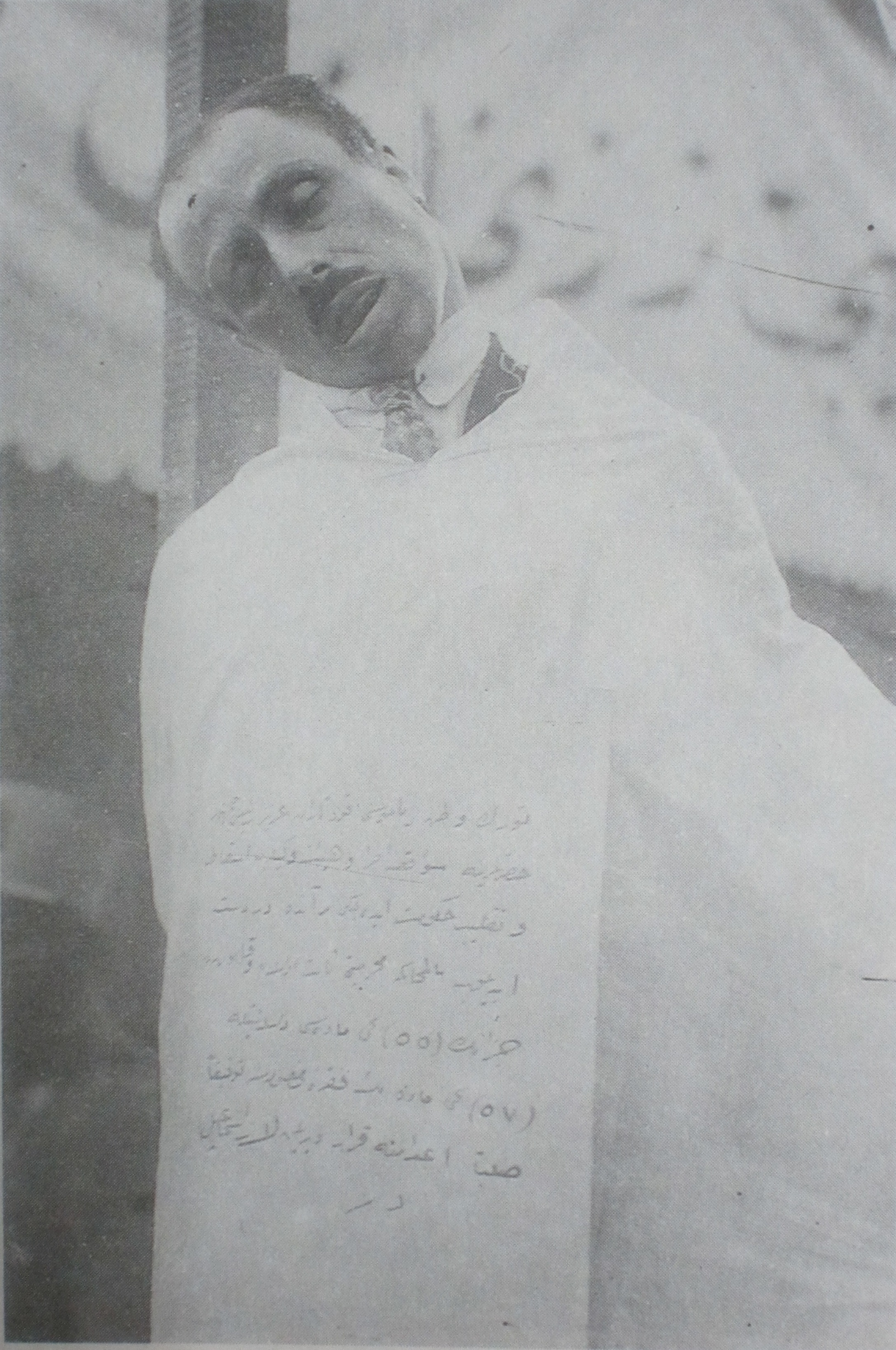
Laz İsmail

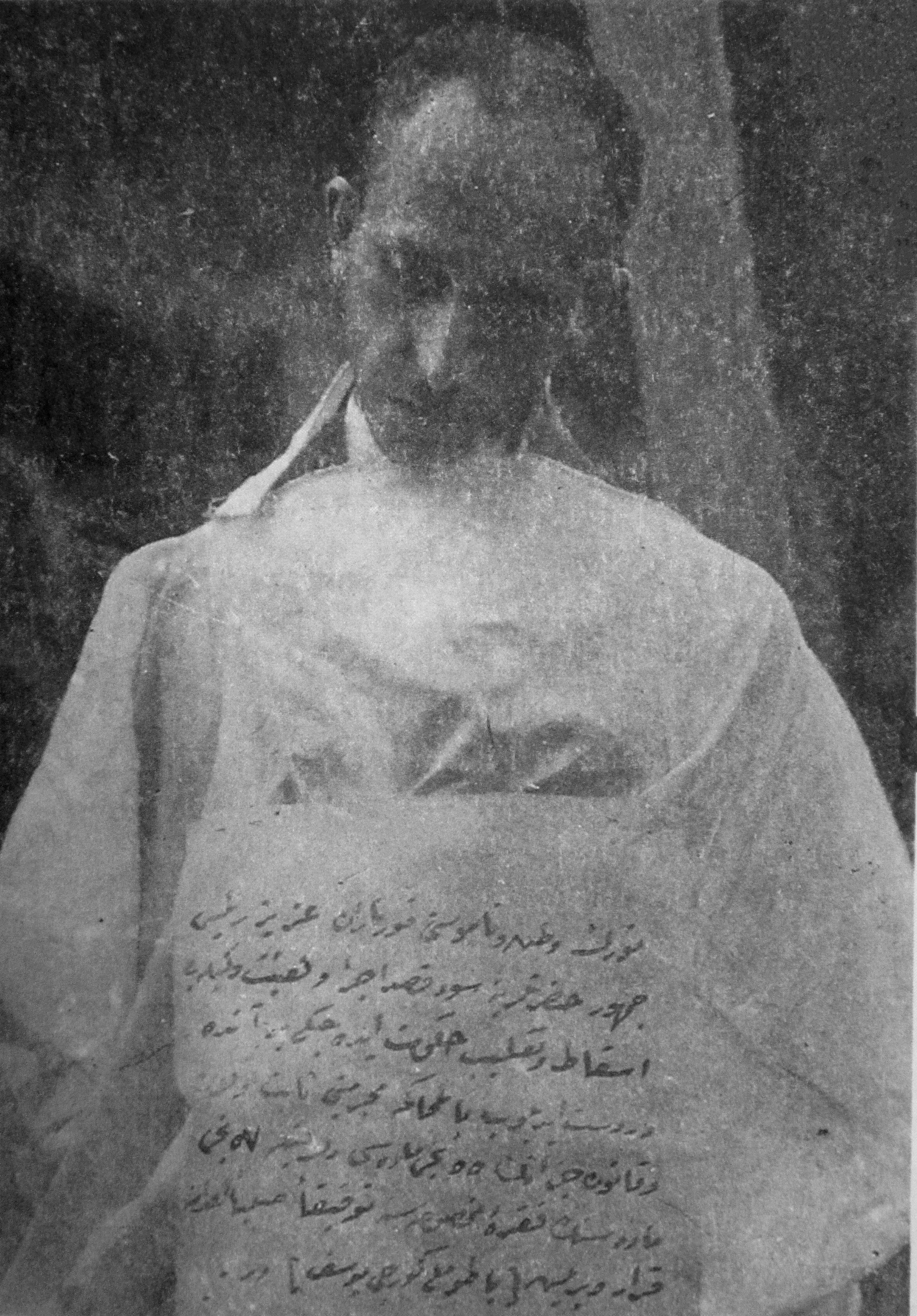
Gürcü Yusuf. His last words before being hanged were "Isn't it a pity? ... Why are you doing this? ... I have up to forty liras. I give it to you. Send it to my children in Batum. They're studying, they're poor ... It'll help them."

1. Ziya Hurşit Bey
2. Laz İsmail
3. Gürcü Yusuf
4. Çopur Hilmi
5. Ahmet Şükrü Bey
6. Mehmet Arif Bey
7. İsmail Canbulat Bey (Although he was first sentenced to 10 years in prison, his sentence was eventually converted to execution)
8. Sarı Efe Edip Bey
9. Abidin Bey
10. Halis Turgut Bey (Although he was first sentenced to 10 years in prison, his sentence was eventually converted to execution)
11. Rüştü Pasha
12. Hafız Mehmet Bey
13. Miralay Rasim Bey
14. Kara Kemal Bey (He was sentenced to death in absentia but committed suicide on 27 July 1926 when he was about to be caught after running away for a while)
15. Abdülkadir Bey (He was sentenced to death in absentia and was caught while he was about to escape to Bulgaria. Later he was put on trial in Ankara. He was again sentenced to death in Ankara, executed on the night of 31 August 1926.)

Other sentences

1. Sürmeneli Vahap (He was first sentenced to 10 years of confinement in a fortress but was eventually exiled to Konya)

Those to be tried in Ankara

1. İhsan Bey
2. Hilmi Bey
3. Cavid Bey
4. Selâhattin Bey
5. Kara Vâsıf Bey
6. Hüseyin Avni Bey
7. Rahmi Bey
8. Rauf Bey
9. Adnan Bey

Acquittals

1. Faik Bey
2. Sabit Bey
3. Halet Bey
4. Feridun Fikri Bey
5. Kâmil Bey
6. Zeki Bey
7. Bekir Sami Bey
8. Besim Bey
9. Necati Bey
10. Münir Hüsrev Bey
11. Kâzım Karabekir Pasha
12. Ali Fuat Pasha

13. Refet Pasha
14. Cafer Tayyar Pasha
15. Cemal Pasha
16. Necati Bey
17. Ahmet Nafiz Bey
18. Torbalılı Emin Efendi
19. Trabzonlu Naciye Nimet Hanım
20. Sürmeneli Keleş Mehmet
21. Bahçıvan İdris
22. Mustafa oğlu Şahin Çavuş
23. Sabahaddin Efendi
24. Giritli Hüseyin oğlu Latif

== Ankara trials ==
The delegation of the Independence Tribunal, which set off from İzmir on 16 July to see to the second portion of the case, arrived in Ankara the next day. The initial preparatory investigations of the defendants started on 21 June and concluded on 31 July, and the indictment prepared by the prosecutor Necip Ali Bey, who departed from Denizli on 28 July, was completed on 31 July. The trial of the former Unionists, who were decided to be tried in Ankara, began on 2 August in the former Parliament Council Building. According to the indictment, other than hatred, the assassination plot was supported by a secret committee to overthrow the government and seize power and the secret committee was composed of some of the members of the Progressive Republican Party and former members of the Committee of Union and Progress and was chaired by Kara Kemal Bey.

=== Inquiries in Ankara trials ===
The inquiries started with Talât Bey. Talât Bey said that he was a member of the Committee of Union and Progress but did not interfere with the community's work on government and economic matters. Later on, the Secretary General of the Committee of Union and Progress Mithat Şükrü (Bleda), police director Azmi Bey, ex-foreign minister Ahmet Nesimi Bey, doctor Hüseyinzâde Ali Bey, Eyüp Sabri Bey, doctor Rasuhi Bey and Hamdi Baba were questioned.

Doctor Nâzım Bey, who was the secretary of the Committee of Union and Progress for eight months, said that he did not know what came of the donations made by the people during this period and added that he was involved in the founding of the Islamic Revolutions Society after fleeing to Crimea and later Germany after World War I. He added that he did not attempt to establish a political party and that he had no connection with the assassination plot, as he had no opposition to Mustafa Kemal Pasha. In his interrogation, Cavid Bey stated that he had met with Kara Kemal Bey and İsmail Canbulat Bey, that a meeting was held with the Unionists at his own home after Kara Kemal Bey met with Mustafa Kemal Pasha and that the subject of this meeting was on a constitutional amendment and had no hidden purpose. Hüseyin Cahit Bey also said that he attended the meeting at Cavid Bey's house and this meeting had no secret purpose, that he was called to the party as a candidate for Istanbul deputy in the early stages of the establishment of the Progressive Republican Party, but he did not accept the offer.

During the hearings in the following days, Salâh Cimcoz Bey, Mithat Şükrü Bey, Ahmet Nesimi Bey, Doctor Rasuhi Bey, Hüseyinzâde Ali Bey, Eyüp Sabri Bey, Azmi Bey, Hamdi Baba, Nail Bey, Said Bey, İbrahim Bey, Naim Cevad Bey, Hasan Fehmi Bey and Hamal Ferid's connection with the alleged crimes was investigated. On 16 August, Naim Cevad Bey, Mithat Bey, Nasib Bey and Nail Bey were tried. Later, Rıza Bey and Nasib Bey were released, and on 19 August, Selâhaddin Bey, Kara Vasıf Bey and Hüseyin Avni Bey were tried. The day after the interrogation of Velid Bey and Ahmet Emin Bey on 21 August, in the indictment prepared by Prosecutor Necip Ali Bey the execution of four people was requested. In the indictment, it was told that the Committee of Union and Progress was a party that stripped people of their rights, that it put the country into World War I in the interests of Germany. It further stated that the committee's ruling group had fled the country after the defeat and planned the İzmir Conspiracy with the desire to regain power after a while. According to the statement made by İhsan Bey, it was Cavid Bey who got Kara Kemal Bey and Şükrü Bey involved in the assassination plot.

=== Pleas made in Ankara trials ===
The defendants' pleas were made on 25 August. Many defendants did not make any pleas different from what they had said during the interrogation. Rauf Bey, who was not questioned and did not make any pleas as he was abroad, sent a letter to the Presidency of the Grand National Assembly of Turkey on 12 October, mentioning that due to parliamentary immunity which can not be waived he could not be prosecuted and since he was abroad he could not have had anything to do with the assassination plot.

In his defense, Cavid Bey stated that he did not want the state to enter World War I when he was the Minister of Finance, that he relieved the government budget with the decisions he made. He added that although he wanted to participate in the War of Independence, his request was not accepted and he had no connection with the assassination plan. Nail Bey said that he did not take any actions that would damage the country and the nation and was not aware of the assassination attempt. Doctor Nâzım Bey stated that he supported the War of Independence and the Islamic Revolution Society, as he had helped with its establishment in Germany. He said that he was prevented from coming to Anatolia by Enver Pasha, and that he attended the meetings at Cavid Bey's house, thinking that they were taking place under Mustafa Kemal Pasha's permission. He made his defense by stating that he had not seen Şükrü Bey, İsmail Canbolat and Kara Kemal Bey for two years and that he had no connection with the assassination plot. Hilmi Bey said that he was engaged in commerce as he had set politics aside when he left the Grand National Assembly, adding that he had not seen Kara Kemal Bey for a long time and first learned about the assassination plot through newspapers.

While the trial of Cavid Bey continued, Abdülkadir Bey, who was sentenced to death in absentia hearings in İzmir, was caught while he was about to flee to Bulgaria and was tried during the hearings in Ankara. Abdülkadir Bey's first hearing was held on 29 August, during which he mentioned who helped him in his escape and how he escaped and added that he supported the Progressive Republican Party. He was charged with intention to overthrow the government, plotting to kill the president and seize power, and on 31 August, the court sentenced him to death.

=== Results of Ankara trials ===
According to the decision of the court read on 26 August, the aim of the meetings held secretly during the time of the Lausanne Conference of 1922–1923 in the house of Cavid Bey, who was trying to seize power after the War of Independence, was for former members of the Committee of Union and Progress to enter the parliament as representatives and deputies and re-establish the old community if this did not happen. In the event of failures, an attempt would have been made to divide the People's Party through Rauf Bey and power would have been seized by establishing a suitable ground for the creation of the Progressive Republican Party. Four executions, six exiles, and two prison sentences were announced with the verdict, while other suspects were acquitted. The four people sentenced to death were executed in front of the General Prison in Cebeci between late 26 August and early 27 August. Those who were executed were buried in the courtyard of the prison. The detainees and the decisions taken against them during the hearings in Ankara are as follows:

Death sentences

1. Cavid Bey
2. Hilmi Bey
3. Nail Bey
4. Dr. Nâzım Bey

Other sentences

1. Vehbi Bey (Initially sentenced to 10 years in prison, but was eventually exiled)
2. Hüsnü Bey (Initially sentenced to 10 years in prison, but was eventually exiled)
3. İbrahim Bey (Initially sentenced to 10 years in prison, but was eventually exiled)
4. Ethem Bey (Initially sentenced to 10 years in prison, but was eventually exiled)
5. Rahmi Bey (Initially sentenced to 10 years in prison, but was eventually exiled)
6. Rauf Bey (Initially sentenced to 10 years in prison, but was eventually exiled)
7. Ali Osman Kâhya (10 years in prison)
8. Salih Kâhya (10 years in prison)

Acquittals

1. Cahit Bey
2. Kara Vasıf Bey
3. Azmi Bey
4. Adnan Bey
5. Küçük Talât Bey
6. Mithat Şükrü Bey
7. Hüseyinzâde Ali Bey
8. Eyüp Sabri Bey
9. Salâh Cimcoz Bey
10. Küçük Nâzım Bey
11. Cemal Ferit Bey
12. Naim Cevat Bey
13. Hasip Bey
14. Rıza Bey
15. Gözlüklü Mithat Bey

16. Hasan Fehmi Bey
17. İhsan Bey
18. Ali Rıza Bey
19. Saadettin Bey
20. Bekir Bey
21. Mehmet Ali Bey
22. Hilmi Bey
23. Cavid Bey
24. İzzet Bey
25. Seyit Bey
26. Salih Reis Bey
27. Tırnakçı Salim Bey
28. Ali Osman Kâhya Bey
29. Selâhattin Bey
30. Hüseyin Avni Bey

31. Gaziantepli Ahmet Muhtar Bey
32. Rifat Bey
33. Sudî Bey
34. Haydar Reşid Bey
35. Zarcı Refik Bey
36. Büyük Mithat Bey
37. Gani Bey
38. Raşid Bey
39. Muhiddin Bey
40. Hasan Sabri Bey
41. İsmail Cabbar Bey
42. Hüseyin Bey
43. Ahmet Nesimi Bey
44. Hamdi Baba
45. Doctor Rasuhi

Historian Vahakn N. Dadrian states that three of the four men executed after the Ankara trial were high-level perpetrators of the Armenian genocide, while the involvement of the fourth, Mehmed Cavid, was negligible, if any, while he had also individually condemned it. Nevertheless, the trial made no reference to their role in the genocide and was unrelated to it.

== Later events ==
As a result of the hearings, all pashas except for Rüştü Pasha were acquitted. These pashas did not return to the army again and were informed that they were retired on 27 January 1927. Rauf Bey, who was sentenced to ten years of exile but was abroad during the decision and returned to the country on 5 July 1935, was acquitted through a statement published on 22 October 1939 by the Deputy Chairman of the Republican People's Party and Prime Minister Refik Saydam and later became a representative of Kastamonu. Following his application to the Military Court of Cassation on 23 July 1943, he was tried by examining the documents of the İzmir Assassination case, and due to his former services, he was subjected to his retirement pension and was completely dismissed from the case.

In the 30th anniversary of the İzmir Conspiracy, a notice appeared in some newspapers in August 1956 which invited people for prayers on 25 August in Şişli Mosque in the memory of Nail Bey, Cavid Bey, Hilmi Bey and Dr. Nâzım Bey, who were executed following the trials in Ankara. The organizer of the event was Nadir Nail Keçili, the son of Nail Bey. Fahri Can, one of the members of the former Committee of Union and Progress, who made statements to journalists in the courtyard of the mosque after prayers, also referred to the acquittal of Rauf Orbay, suggesting that similar mistakes could have been made in the prosecution of other defendants. Can said that he represented the families of those who were executed and wanted a court hearing again, and added that they would bring the executed people's bodies to the Monument of Liberty, where they deserved to be. In the days when the announcement was made, it found its place in the printed media of the period, but it later lost its importance and the attempt failed before reaching the legal authorities.

== In popular culture ==
The background of the assassination attempt is explained through the eyes of the members of the Committee of Union and Progress, in the novel named Kurt Kanunu, written by Kemal Tahir in 1969. The sections of the book, which consists of three chapters, are narrated by Abdülkadir Bey (referred to as Abdülkerim Bey in the book), Kara Kemal Bey and the latter's childhood friend Emin Bey, respectively. The novel was adapted into a movie in 1992, and later a TV series in 2012.

== See also ==
- Politics of Turkey
- List of assassinated people from Turkey
