= Karakol society =

Turkish intelligence organization in the Ottoman Empire

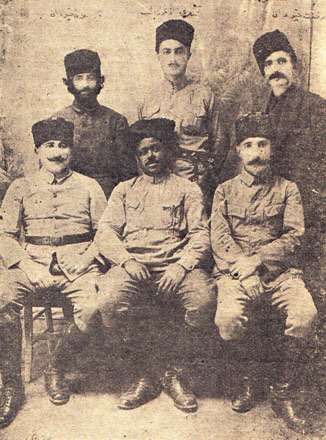
Members of the Karakol society

The Karakol society (Turkish: Karakol Cemiyeti), also known Guard Society, was a Turkish clandestine intelligence organization that fought on the side of the Turkish National Movement during the Turkish War of Independence. Formed in November 1918, it refused to merge itself with Association for the Defense of the Rights of Anatolia and Rumelia under Mustafa Kemal Atatürk. Its leadership was decapitated in the aftermath of the 1920 Turkish Grand National Assembly election, leading to its eventual dissolution in 1926.

== Operation ==
The Karakol Society was founded in November 1918 as the first clandestine organization fighting against the Allied Occupation of Constantinople. It served as a continuation of the Committee of Union and Progress' intelligence agency, the Special Organization, with the majority of its members coming from the latter. It was founded by Kara Vâsıf Bey and Kara Kemal on Talaat Pasha's orders, soon after he fled the country. The name was chosen on the grounds that it was the amalgamation of the founder's names; a secret password (K.G.) was also adopted. Karakol's central committee consisted of Kara Vâsıf Bey, Baha Said Bey, Refik Ismail Bey, Ali Riza Bey (Bebe), Edip Servet Bey (Tör), Kemalletin Sami Bey, and Galatali Sevket Bey. The aims of the organization were outlined as protecting and, where non existent, establishing national unity through legitimate means behind the scenes. Revolutionary action was to be taken in the case of oppressors of freedom and justice. The third article of the declaration of establishment highlighted Karakol's socialist nature.

During his stay in Constantinople between November 1918 and May 1919 Mustafa Kemal Atatürk met with Ali Fethi Bey, Kara Kemal, Ismail Canbulat, and an unknown fourth person, whereupon a revolutionary committee was established. The committee was to assassinate the sultan and overthrow the government, applying pressure on the government that was to succeed it. Canbulat's hesitation temporarily halted the committee's plans, which were later abandoned after its members agreed that the sultan's removal would not be enough to save the crumbling Ottoman Empire. Mustafa Kemal departed for Anatolia, which was to become the center of the Turkish resistance movement. Karakol created a line of communication and transportation between Constantinople and Anatolia, smuggling volunteers, weapons, and armaments into the latter. Karakol representatives took part in the Erzurum and Sivas Congresses, where they supported the unification of various resistance organizations under the banner of the Association for the Defense of the Rights of Anatolia and Rumelia (ADRAR), and Karakol went on to publish the Amasya Protocol. However a rift soon emerged between the Karakol leadership and Kemal; Karakol refused to accept Ankara as the center of national resistance and continued to act independently from ADRAR, seeing itself as the real core of the resistance. Kemal became suspicious of Karakol's intentions, ordering it to terminate its activities.

== Downfall ==
On 11 January 1920, Baha Said Bey traveled to Baku where he signed an alliance with the Bolsheviks, presenting himself as an envoy of the Turkish resistance. On 26 February, Kara Vâsıf Bey informed Kemal of the agreement, which Kemal rebuffed as illegitimate since it was concluded without ADRAR's knowledge or consent. Kemal once more requested Karakol to incorporate itself into ADRAR. Karakol remained defiant, operating until the 1920 Turkish Grand National Assembly election, which was disrupted when British troops entered the parliament and arrested several deputies on 16 March. A part of Karakol's leadership was subsequently exiled to Malta, others either joined Kemal in Ankara or Enver Pasha in the Caucasus. Insignificant remnants of Karakol continued to exist until 1926, however Kemal had already solidified his position at the head of the Turkish National Movement. Karakol's function as an intelligence agency was substituted by a number of other organizations including Yavuz Group, Zabitan Group, Hamza Group. They continued to operate until the end of the independence war. Karakol is considered one of the precursor organizations to the modern day National Intelligence Organization, MİT.
