= Mustafa Kemal Atatürk's statements on the Armenian genocide =

Mustafa Kemal Atatürk's statements on the Armenian genocide include Mustafa Kemal Atatürk's speeches, parliamentary remarks, correspondence, interviews and later writings regarding the Armenian genocide.

Despite a few politically motivated acknowledgments of wartime "cruelties", Kemal repeatedly denied or minimized the massacres, justified the deportations as militarily necessary and blamed Armenians for their own persecution. Historians have identified his statements as an important foundation of the Turkish Republic's subsequent Armenian genocide denial.

== Background ==
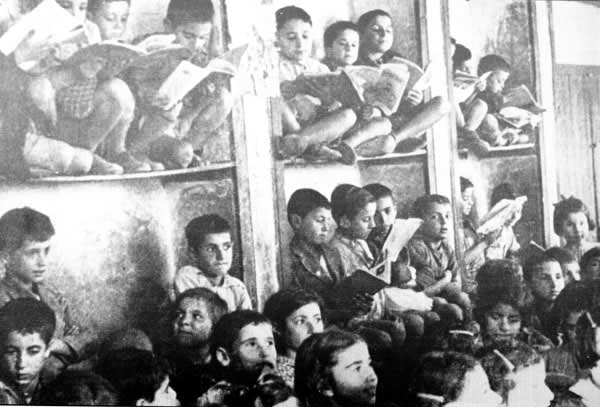
Armenian refugee children in Aleppo in 1915.

The Armenian genocide was carried out between 1915 and 1917 by the Ottoman government led by the Committee of Union and Progress (CUP).

After the Armistice of Mudros in October 1918, the Ottoman authorities established courts-martial to prosecute officials implicated in wartime deportations and massacres. At the same time, Kemal's emerging nationalist movement depended on those same officials.

== Statements ==
=== December 1917: Strasbourg argument ===
In December 1917, while visiting Strasbourg, German imperial governor Johann von Dallwitz raised the issue of the mistreatment of Armenians with Crown Prince Vahdettin, who asked Kemal to speak because "he knew about it". Kemal argued with Dallwitz, accused him of speaking in favor of the Armenians, rejected Armenian historical and national claims and then quickly ended the discussion without answering any of Dallwitz's accusations.

=== May 1919: Intervention in the Merzifon investigation ===
In May 1919, an investigative commission in Merzifon was examining former Ottoman officials suspected of involvement in the Armenian genocide, including local members of the Committee of Union and Progress. After Kemal arrived in Havza on 25 May and was informed of the investigation, he sent the commission's chairman a telegram telling him to leave the case files with the judiciary and resign, warning: "Otherwise, we shall be compelled to use force."

The chairman of the commission, under this threat, complied, despite opposition from the commission's Greek member. Deli Hasanzade Hüseyin Bey, a former mayor of Merzifon who had been detained over his involvement in the deportations at Zara, was then released on bail. Kemal also demanded the commission's immediate dissolution by telegram.

=== July 1919: Erzurum Congress ===
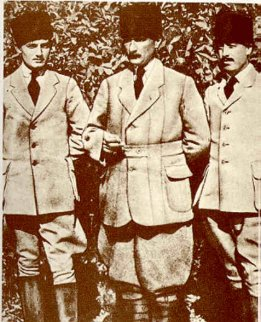
Mustafa Kemal during the Erzurum Congress in July 1919.

At the opening of the Erzurum Congress on 23 July 1919, Kemal accused Armenians in the eastern borderlands of expelling, killing and dispossessing Muslims. He claimed that they were trying to displace the local Muslim population and introduce additional Armenians into the eastern provinces. Ulgen notes that throughout 1919 and 1920 Kemal repeatedly described alleged Armenian attacks against Muslims as a policy of extermination, while using less explicit language for Ottoman violence against Armenians.

=== September 1919: Sivas Congress and General Harbord memorandum ===
In his opening address to the Sivas Congress, Kemal depicted Armenians as a danger to the eastern frontier and accused them of pursuing an annihilatory policy against Turks. In a memorandum presented to American general James G. Harbord in September, he alleged that Armenians in the First Republic of Armenia were acting to exterminate Muslims. He claimed to possess evidence of Armenian orders and described Muslim refugees crossing the frontier as proof of the allegations.

During his meeting with Harbord, Kemal reportedly acknowledged the massacre of "800,000 Armenians", but blamed a "small committee that had seized control of the Ottoman government". In addition, rather than offering an unconditional condemnation, he, instead, countered with claims of alleged Greek atrocities against Turks in Smyrna (Harbord himself noted that this was used by Kemal as propaganda) and also invoked killings and other crimes in the United States, France and Britain to argue that Turkey was being "unfairly" singled out. This acknowledgment was "defensive" and exercised for external consumption, since Kemal sought to win American support while preserving Ottoman territorial integrity.

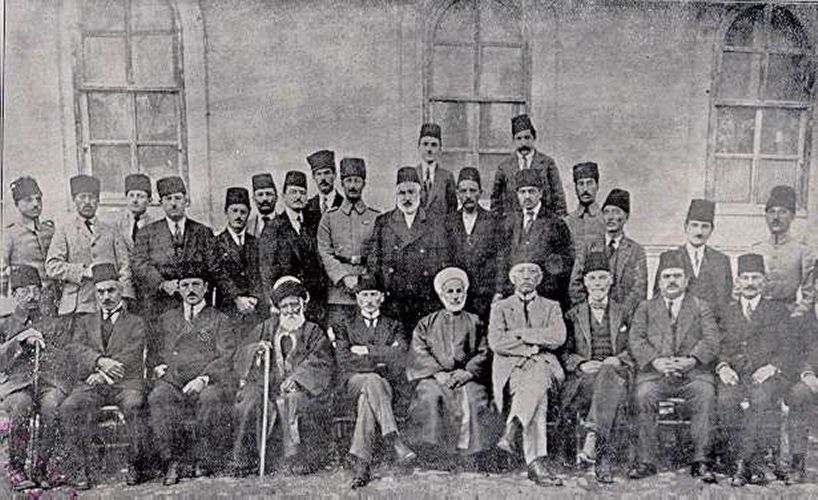
The Sivas Congress in September 1919, with Mustafa Kemal among the delegates.

In a separate September 1919 memorandum to the Ottoman government, Kemal argued that punishment of those responsible for wartime crimes should not remain merely a threat. He believed that carrying out punishments of the perpetrators would impress foreign powers. Akçam places this position, too, in the context of the nationalists' efforts to obtain a more favorable peace settlement and preserve sovereignty over Anatolia.

=== October 1919: Amasya Protocols ===
In October 1919, Kemal's representatives and the Ottoman government negotiated the Amasya Protocols. Their provisions envisaged prosecuting individuals implicated in crimes committed during the Armenian deportations and preventing fugitive Unionists associated with the massacres from taking part in the forthcoming elections. The protocols represented a formal, if ultimately unfulfilled, commitment to wartime accountability.

Dadrian interprets the nationalist movement's 1919 declarations as political accommodations that helped distance it from the CUP and its wartime crimes. Akçam likewise emphasizes the relationship between the promised prosecutions and the peace negotiations, while cautioning against treating Kemal's position as that of a disinterested humanitarian advocate.

=== December 1919: Ankara addresses ===
==== 28 December: Address to Ankara notables ====
The day after arriving in Ankara, Kemal addressed local notables at the Agricultural School. He rejected the charge that the Ottoman state had oppressed Christian minorities and attributed their suffering to alleged "separatist activity" and collaboration with foreign powers. He described the events of 1915 as "some unwelcome circumstances" for which there were "many reasons and justifications", and contrasted Ottoman treatment of non-Muslims with the conduct of European powers toward colonized peoples and minorities. Ulgen identifies the address as an example of blaming victims for their fate while relativizing the violence committed against Armenians.

==== 31 December: Remarks on Turkish conduct ====
In another Ankara address, Kemal denied that the Turkish nation had been an oppressor and, instead, blamed the suffering of non-Muslims on alleged separatism and foreign intrigue. On 31 December he asserted that "it is impossible for such a nation [like the Turks] to exterminate other peoples" and attributed "all that happened to the non-Muslim people in our country", i.e. to the victims themselves.

=== 20 February 1920: Letter to Talaat Pasha ===
In a 20 February 1920 letter to Talaat Pasha, one of the principal architects of the Armenian genocide, Kemal "identified himself as in consensus with Talaat, rejecting any prosecution for war guilt or war crimes", dismissing the search for those responsible as "illogical", and stating that he had refused the Istanbul Government's demand to publicly condemn the Unionist cabinet. He also added that he had defended the same position in his dealings with foreign representatives.

In the same letter, Kemal praised Talaat's activities in Europe and requested that he provide 50,000 Ottoman lira in order to support the Turkish National Movement. He also insisted that their correspondence remain secret, warning that its disclosure would allow opponents to portray the movement as Unionist. Regarding the "Armenian question", Kemal complained that Americans were Turkey's most hostile critics.

=== 24 April 1920: Speech to the Grand National Assembly ===
The Grand National Assembly of Turkey building in Ankara, photographed around 1920.

At the Grand National Assembly of Turkey on 24 April 1920, Kemal discussed an earlier British communication which had made the cessation of Armenian massacres a condition for retaining Constantinople under Ottoman sovereignty. He referred to atrocities at the beginning of the World War as a "shameful act", but immediately disputed the claim that massacres of Armenians were occurring or had occurred, asking "Where in our country had massacres of Armenians taken place? Or where are they taking place?" and accused the Allies of using fabricated charges to justify their policies toward Turkey.

Kemal then drew attention to alleged Armenian violence in Cilicia and along the eastern frontier and maintained that the Turkish nation had protected Armenians despite attacks on Muslims. Ulgen argues that his acknowledgment of a past "shameful act" was immediately qualified by the denial or minimization of Armenian massacres and the portrayal of Turks as humanitarian protectors. When Kemal revisited the same Allied allegations in his 1927 Nutuk, the reference to the "shameful act" was absent.

According to Ulgen, such limited concessions were a form of Armenian genocide denial, largely similar that of the modern Turkish state. She notes that, like Kemal, the official Turkish account admitted that some individuals had committed certain "abuses" during deportations while rejecting the proposition that the deportations involved organized, intentional mass killing.

=== 24 April–1 May 1920: Closed parliamentary sessions ===
Kemal returned to the Armenian question in a closed session of the Grand National Assembly on the same day, 24 April 1920. He asserted that Armenians were exterminating Muslims on the eastern frontier, while explaining that nationalist forces had avoided direct intervention so as not to arouse British or American suspicions of a repetition of the wartime "incident". Ulgen notes to his description of the events of 1915 as something that had "somehow" happened during the World War, even when speaking privately to the Assembly.

On 1 May 1920, in another secret sitting discussing the conflict with French forces in Cilicia, Kemal characterized earlier violence between Armenians and Turks as "bloody incidents" produced by imperialist policies. He repeated his accusation that Armenian groups sought to exterminate Muslims wherever they encountered them.

=== 12 August 1920: Letter concerning executions ===
The signing of the Treaty of Sèvres in August 1920 marked a change in Kemal's public attitude toward the postwar trials. In a letter dated 12 August, he criticized the Ottoman government's continued execution of men convicted over deportations and massacres, asserting that these executions "no longer have a meaning".

=== 27 December 1920: Letter to Georgy Chicherin ===
During negotiations for Soviet military and financial assistance, Kemal wrote to Soviet foreign commissar Georgy Chicherin on 27 December 1920 to protest proposals that Van, Bitlis and Muş be ceded to Armenia. He argued that such territorial concessions conflicted with self-determination and with the Soviet government's professed opposition to imperialism. He also denied that Armenians had constituted a majority in the eastern Ottoman provinces.

In discussing the genocide, Kemal told Chicherin of an alleged history of "bloody conflicts" between Turks and Armenians that had supposedly caused comparable losses to both peoples. He blamed these conflicts on Tsarist and Western intervention and invoked alleged Armenian atrocities after the Russian withdrawal of 1917. Ulgen argues that the letter recast the Armenian genocide into a bothsideist interpretation.

=== 26 February 1921: Public Ledger interview ===
In February 1921, responding to questions from Public Ledger correspondent Clarence Streit, Kemal dismissed accounts of massacres against Armenians as "great exaggerations" promoted by hostile critics. He argued that the deportations had been a military necessity after Armenian revolutionaries supposedly attacked Ottoman supply convoys and civilian settlements while Ottoman forces were confronting the Russian army. He maintained that most deportees were still alive and would have returned to their homes had the Allies not prolonged the conflict. He also accused Armenians and Anatolian Greeks of committing massacres against Turks.

=== Spring 1921: Prisoner-exchange negotiations ===
In spring 1921, Kemal rejected a proposed prisoner-exchange agreement with Britain negotiated by foreign minister Bekir Sami, because the arrangement excluded several former Unionists accused of involvement in the Armenian genocide. Kemal pressed for the release of all Turkish detainees, including those held at Malta.

=== September 1922: Remarks following the capture of Smyrna ===
After the Turkish capture of Smyrna in September 1922, Kemal told Western officials that the country's Christians "had to go".

=== March 1923: Adana address ===
During a visit to Adana in March 1923, Kemal told local shopkeepers: "Armenians and others have no rights in this bountiful country. Your homeland is yours; it belongs to the Turks. This country was Turkish in history; therefore, it is Turkish and will remain Turkish forever".

=== June 1926: Disputed interview with the Los Angeles Examiner and İzmir plot trials ===
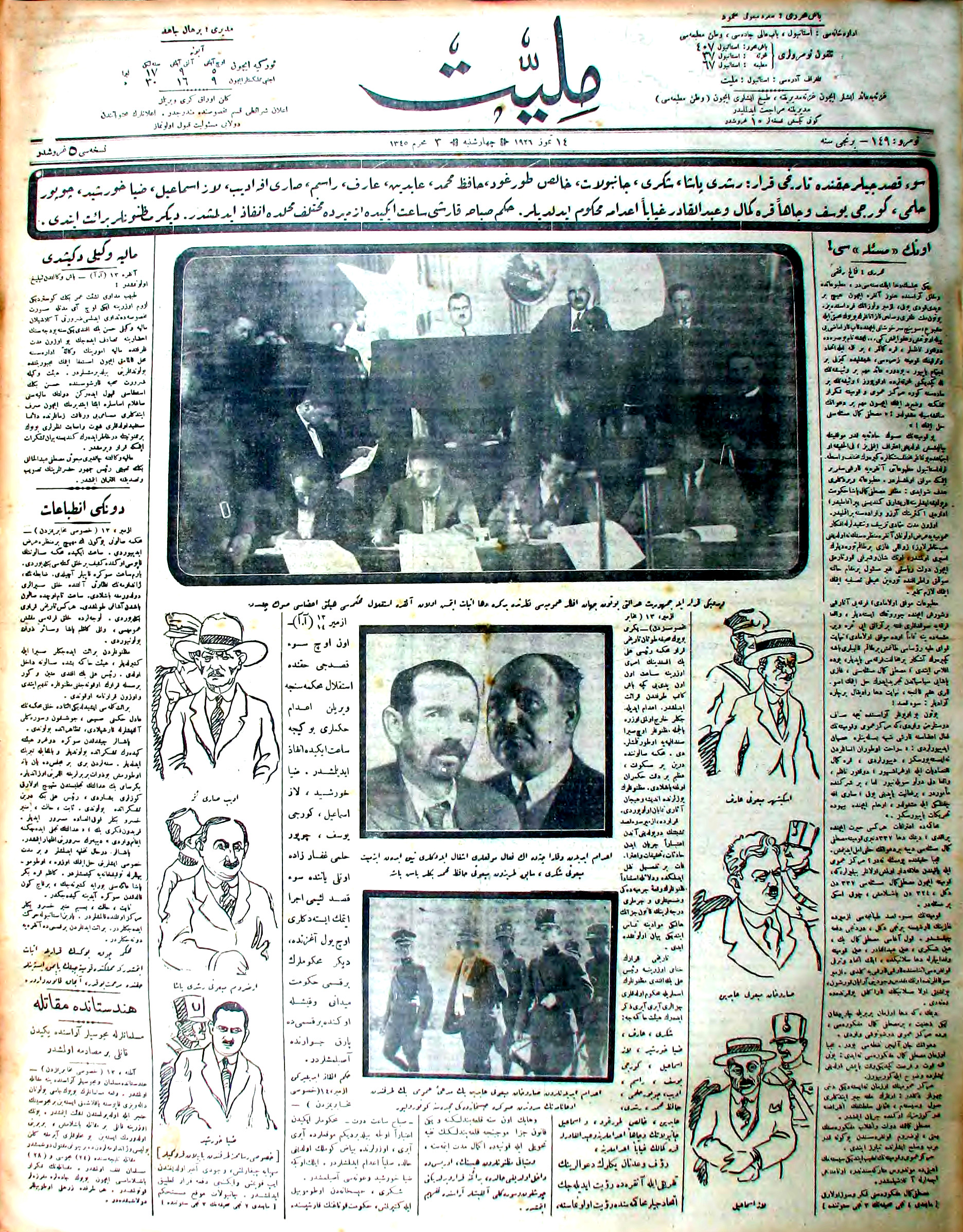
The news about the results of the İzmir trials on the first page of Milliyet newspaper on 14 July 1926.

On 22 June 1926, Kemal purportedly gave an interview to Swiss journalist Emile Hilderbrand published in the American newspaper Los Angeles Examiner on 1 August, in which Kemal allegedly declared that the Unionists involved in the supposed İzmir plot should have been held accountable for the deaths of "millions of our Christian subjects".

The interview's authenticity has been disputed. Türkkaya Ataöv argued in 1988 that it was fabricated, citing the absence of any record of the meeting and difficulties establishing the interviewer's identity. Philip M. Pedley challenged this conclusion in 2018, identifying the interviewer as Swedish journalist Karl Emil Hildebrand and arguing that the interview was genuine. M. Arif Demirer disputed Pedley's conclusion in 2023, questioning Pedley's identification of the supposedly Swiss interviewer as Swedish journalist Karl Emil Hildebrand and how it reached American newspapers rather than first being published in Sweden, among other things.

Historian Erik-Jan Zürcher expressed "serious doubt" about the interview's authenticity and reliability, noting that Kemal did not condemn the Armenian genocide during the 1926 trials of former Unionists. Historian Taner Akçam accepted the interview as real, but argued that it was part of an effort to improve Turkey's image in the United States, where opposition to ratifying the 1923 Turkish–American treaty was partly driven by the Armenian genocide. Zürcher adds that, even if genuine, the interview's condemnation of the massacres was intended for "foreign consumption" and he notes that these trials did not address the Unionists' involvement in the genocide at all, but were rather show trials to remove political opposition to his rule.

=== October 1927: Nutuk ===
In October 1927, Kemal delivered Nutuk, his extensive account of the nationalist movement and the founding of the Republic. In the narrative, allegations of Armenian massacres featured primarily as charges used by foreign powers to justify the occupation and partition of Turkey. Kemal referred to some wartime "extortions and cruelties" while denying that the Turkish population as a whole had taken part and minimizing the scale and character of violence against Armenians.

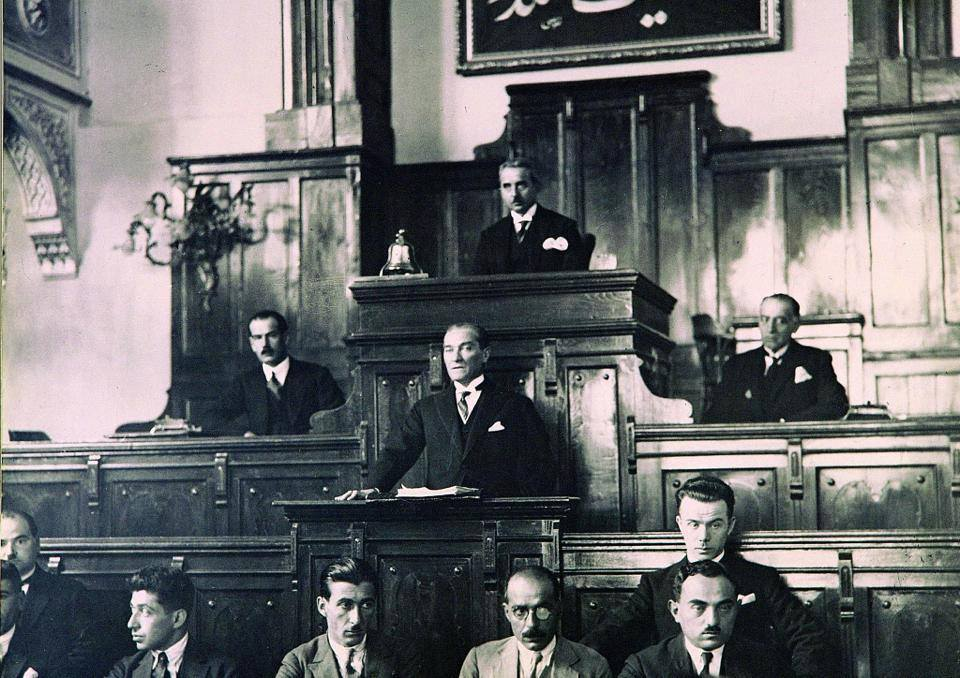
Mustafa Kemal delivering Nutuk in October 1927.

At the same time, Nutuk repeatedly described Armenians as perpetrators, emphasizing alleged massacres against Muslims in the eastern provinces and around Marash. Ulgen notes that the contrast between the vivid descriptions of Armenian atrocities and the comparatively restrained or dismissive language applied to the destruction of Armenians in 1915. She further notes that the "shameful act" acknowledged in Kemal's April 1920 parliamentary speech did not reappear when he discussed the same British intervention in Nutuk.

Scholars have identified the omission of the genocide and the reversal of victim and perpetrator as central elements of the Republic's founding historical narrative.

=== 1931: Republican history textbooks ===
The account established in Nutuk was reproduced in histories issued under the early Republic. Ulgen examines the 1931 school textbook Tarih IV, which depicted the nationalist war against Armenia under a heading translated as "The Armenians Trampled and the Greeks Defeated". Its explanation of the 1920 war repeated Kemal's allegations in Nutuk that Armenians had massacred Turks in Armenia and the border districts. Ulgen treats the textbook as an example of Kemal's depiction of Armenians becoming institutionalized in national education, an institutionalization which has continued to this day.

== Release and pardon of genocide perpetrators ==
Kemal's government overturned the verdicts of the Istanbul trials of 1919–1920. On 31 March 1923, the Grand National Assembly passed Law No. 318, granting a general amnesty to those convicted by military and civilian courts.

Kemal also rehabilitated and honored convicted perpetrators. Mehmed Kemal Bey and Nusret Bey, both executed following their convictions for crimes against Armenians, were declared "national martyrs", while their families received pensions. Subsequent legislation awarded pensions and confiscated Armenian property to the families of leading Unionists, including Talaat Pasha and Behaeddin Şakir, two of the principal organizers of the genocide. Kemal personally signed instructions authorizing the transfer of confiscated Armenian property to these families.

== Assessments ==
Despite the occasional politically motivated acknowledgment, Kemal's portrayal of Armenians and the Armenian genocide actually remained "generally consistent across the years and in various political documents". His rhetoric consistently emphasized alleged Armenian violence while minimizing atrocities committed against Armenians, helping establish the portrayal of Armenians as perpetrators and Turks as an oppressed and innocent nation. He defended the dispossession of Armenians, protected former perpetrators and opposed the return of survivors. In the Republic's official narrative, the deportations and mass killings were pushed aside in favor of Armenian separatism, foreign intervention and alleged violence against Muslims. Ulgen further argues that Kemal's limited acknowledgments were themselves compatible with genocide denial, since his account, like the later official Turkish position, admitted isolated abuses while rejecting the characterization of the deportations as organized and intentional mass murder. This helps explain why Kemal's statements cannot be evaluated by whether he used expressions such as "shameful act" or "cruelties".

Kemal's descriptions of Armenian and Turkish suffering later helped establish the contrast between the supposed innocence of Turks and the alleged aggression of Armenians in Turkish national historiography.

== Sources ==
- Akar, Hulusi (2005). Harbord Military Mission to Armenia: The Story of an American Fact Finding Mission and Its Effects on Turkish-American Relations (PhD dissertation). Boğaziçi University.
- Akçam, Taner (2006). A Shameful Act: The Armenian Genocide and the Question of Turkish Responsibility. Metropolitan Books. ISBN 978-0-8050-8665-2.
- Akçam, Taner (13 December 2013). "Los Angeles Examiner 1926". HyeTert.
- Ataöv, Türkkaya (1988). Another Falsification: "Statement" (1926) Wrongly Attributed to M. Kemâl Atatürk. Ankara: Sistem Ofset.
- Avedian, Vahagn (2012). "State Identity, Continuity, and Responsibility: The Ottoman Empire, the Republic of Turkey and the Armenian Genocide". European Journal of International Law. 23 (3): 797–820. doi:10.1093/ejil/chs056.
- Baer, Marc David (2020). Sultanic Saviors and Tolerant Turks: Writing Ottoman Jewish History, Denying the Armenian Genocide. Indiana University Press. ISBN 978-0-253-04542-3.
- Dadrian, Vahakn N. (1991). "The Documentation of the World War I Armenian Massacres in the Proceedings of the Turkish Military Tribunal". International Journal of Middle East Studies. 23 (4): 549–576. doi:10.1017/S0020743800023412.
- Dadrian, Vahakn N. (1991). "Documentation of the Armenian Genocide in Turkish Sources". In Charny, Israel W. (ed.). Genocide: A Critical Bibliographic Review. Vol. 2. London: Mansell Publishing. pp. 86–138.
- Dadrian, Vahakn N. (2011). "Emergent Kemalism and the Courts-Martial". Judgment at Istanbul: The Armenian Genocide Trials. Book co-authored with Taner Akçam; chapter authored by Dadrian. New York: Berghahn Books. pp. 101–107. ISBN 978-0-85745-251-1.
- Demirer, M. Arif (11 September 2023). "Philip M. Pedley ve ATATÜRK – 2". Anayurt Gazetesi (in Turkish).
- Göçek, Fatma Müge (2011). "Reading Genocide: Turkish Historiography on 1915". In Suny, Ronald Grigor; Göçek, Fatma Müge; Naimark, Norman M. (eds.). A Question of Genocide: Armenians and Turks at the End of the Ottoman Empire. Oxford University Press. pp. 42–52. doi:10.1093/acprof:osobl/9780195393743.003.0003.
- Grabill, Joseph L. (1971). Protestant Diplomacy and the Near East: Missionary Influence on American Policy, 1810–1927. Minneapolis: University of Minnesota Press. ISBN 9780816605750.
- Kieser, Hans-Lukas (2023). When Democracy Died: The Middle East's Enduring Peace of Lausanne. Cambridge: Cambridge University Press. doi:10.1017/9781009029957. ISBN 978-1-316-51642-3.
- Kreiser, Klaus (2008). Atatürk: Eine Biographie (in German). Munich: C. H. Beck. ISBN 978-3-406-57671-3.
- Kreiser, Klaus (21 February 2008). "Ein Türke auf Reisen". Die Zeit (in German). No. 9.
- Kurt, Ümit (2024). "1923 and the legacies of genocide". History Compass. 22 (4) e12800. doi:10.1111/hic3.12800. hdl:1959.13/1504108.
- Maogoto, Jackson Nyamuya (2004). War Crimes and Realpolitik: International Justice from World War I to the 21st Century. Boulder, Colorado: Lynne Rienner Publishers. doi:10.1515/9781685857318. ISBN 978-1-58826-252-3.
- Martoyan, Tehmine (2017). "The Destruction of Smyrna in 1922". In Shirinian, George N. (ed.). Genocide in the Ottoman Empire: Armenians, Assyrians, and Greeks, 1913–1923. Berghahn Books. ISBN 978-1-78533-433-7.
- Morris, Benny; Ze'evi, Dror (2024). "The Genocide of the Christians, Turkey 1894–1924". In Kühne, Thomas; Rein, Mary Jane; Mamigonian, Marc A. (eds.). Documenting the Armenian Genocide. Palgrave Macmillan. pp. 251–272. doi:10.1007/978-3-031-36753-3_13.
- Pedley, Philip M. (2018). The Atatürk Interview: Armenian Tall Tales or an Inconvenient Truth?. London: Gomidas Institute. ISBN 9781909382435.
- Susoy, Şenol (2008). Millî Mücadele Yıllarında Amasya (PDF) (Master's thesis) (in Turkish). Marmara University.
- Tekeli, İlhan; İlkin, Selim (1980). "Kurtuluş Savaşında Talat Paşa ile Mustafa Kemal'in Mektuplaşmaları". Belleten. 44 (174): 301–346. doi:10.37879/belleten.1980.301.
- Timur, Taner (2007). Türkler ve Ermeniler: 1915 ve Sonrası (in Turkish) (3rd ed.). Ankara: İmge Kitabevi. ISBN 9789755333182.
- Tuzcu, Ali (1993). "Merzifon'da Ermeni Ayaklanmaları". Belleten (in Turkish). 57 (220): 795–826. doi:10.37879/belleten.1993.795.
- Ulgen, Fatma (2010). "Reading Mustafa Kemal Atatürk on the Armenian genocide of 1915". Patterns of Prejudice. 44 (4): 369–391. doi:10.1080/0031322X.2010.510719.
- Ulgen, Fatma (2010). "Sabiha Gökçen's 80-Year-Old Secret": Kemalist Nation Formation and the Ottoman Armenians (PhD dissertation). University of California, San Diego.
- Zürcher, Erik-Jan (2010). The Young Turk Legacy and Nation Building: From the Ottoman Empire to Atatürk's Turkey. London: I.B. Tauris. ISBN 9781848852723.
- Zürcher, Erik Jan (2011). "Renewal and Silence: Postwar Unionist and Kemalist Rhetoric on the Armenian Genocide". In Suny, Ronald Grigor; Göçek, Fatma Müge; Naimark, Norman M. (eds.). A Question of Genocide: Armenians and Turks at the End of the Ottoman Empire. Oxford University Press. pp. 306–316. doi:10.1093/acprof:osobl/9780195393743.003.0016.
