= Mehmet Arif Bey =

Turkish politician

1317-P. 17 Mehmet Arif Bey
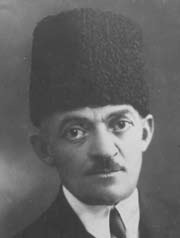
- Born: 1882; Adana, Ottoman Empire
- Died: 13 July 1926 (aged 43–44); İzmir, Turkey
- Military career
- Allegiance: Ottoman Empire; Turkey
- Service years: Ottoman Empire: 1902–1919; Turkey: 19 May 1919 – January 1922
- Rank: Miralay
- Nickname: "Ayıcı" Arif
- Commands: Chief of Staff of the 5th Division, Infantry School; Chief of Staff of the Inspectorate of Rear Area of the Eastern Armies; 11th Division, 3rd Group, Secretary of the Commander-in-Chief, III Corps
- Conflicts: Balkan Wars; World War I Turkish War of Independence
- Awards: Gallipoli Star; Silver Medal of Liyaqat; Prussia Iron Cross; Medal of Independence
- Other work: Member of the GNAT (Eskişehir)

Mehmet Arif Bey (1882 – 13 July 1926), also known as "Ayıcı" Arif ("Bear-Leader Arif"), was an officer of the Ottoman Army and the Turkish Army. He was hanged on 13 July 1926 as one of 15 people convicted of the İzmir plot to assassinate President Mustafa Kemal.

== Works ==
- Anadolu İnkılabı ve Mücahedat-ı Milliye Hatırası (1335 – 1339) (reprinted as Anadolu İnkılabı ve Millî Mücadele Anıları (1919-1923), Arba Yayınları, 1987.)

== Medals and decorations ==
- Gallipoli Star (Ottoman Empire)
- Silver Imtiyaz Medal
- Silver Medal of Liyaqat
- Prussia Iron Cross
- Medal of Independence with Red Ribbon and Citation

== See also ==
- List of high-ranking commanders of the Turkish War of Independence
