= Mustafa Vasıf Karakol =

Turkish politician (1880–1931)

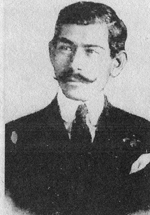
- Born: 1880 'Asir, Ottoman Empire
- Died: 5 December 1931 (aged 50–51); Kadıköy, Istanbul, Turkey
- Burial place: near Zühtü Pasha Mosque
- Spouse: Mediha Karakol
- Children: İlhan Karakol, Türkan Karakol, Aytekin Karakol, Aygül Demirkol, Aydın Karakol, Beyhan Karakol
- Military career
- Allegiance: Ottoman Empire
- Service years: Ottoman: January 2, 1901-November 28, 1916
- Rank: Ottoman: Miralay
- Commands: President of the Ottoman Military Academy, 4th Department of the General Starr, Chief of Staff of the General Directorate of Rear Area, Inspector of the Rear Area of the Third Army, 27th Division
- Conflicts: Balkan Wars; First World War
- Other work: Member of the GNAT (Sivas)

Kara Vâsıf Bey (1880 – December 5, 1931), later known as Mustafa Vasıf Karakol, was an officer of the Ottoman Army, and a politician of the Republic of Turkey. He was one of the founding members of the Karakol society and his family took the surname "Karakol" after his death.

== Early life ==
He traveled around the empire in early childhood due to his father civil service appointments. He eventually enlisted in the Military Academy in 1898. He was an officer in the Action Army which suppressed the 31 March rebellion. He resigned from the army in 1916.

== Political career ==
He was one of the founding and most active member of the Karakol Society, which was established as an underground resistance organization in reaction to occupation of Istanbul at the end of WWI. After numerous military leaders moved to Anatolian hinterland to launch the War of Independence, he was the key link to them and represented Association for the Defence of National Rights of Anatolia and Rumelia. He was elected to the last and 4th Ottoman Parliament as representative of Sivas. Eventually he was arrested by the occupation authorities and imprisoned at Malta. After his return, he was again elected to the 1st TBMM from Sivas.

He was arrested in 1926 with suspicion of participating in the attempt (İzmir plot) on life of Ataturk. Eventually he was cleared of all charges and freed. Later in life he was involved in private business.

== Medals and decorations ==
- Medal of Independence with Green Ribbon

== See also ==
- Karakol society
