= Kemal Tahir =

Turkish novelist and intellectual (1910-1973)

- Born: 13 March 1910; Istanbul, Ottoman Empire
- Died: 21 April 1973 (aged 63); Istanbul, Turkey
- Occupation: Novelist

Kemal Tahir (March 13, 1910 – April 21, 1973) was a prominent Turkish novelist and intellectual. Tahir spent 13 years of his life imprisoned for political reasons and wrote some of his best known novels during this time.

His most important novels include Esir Şehrin İnsanları (1956), Devlet Ana (1967) and Yorgun Savaşçı (1965), in all of which Tahir uses historical background to support his characters and settings. Some of his novels were adapted into popular films. Tahir also wrote pulp fiction under pseudonyms for financial reasons.

== Biography ==
Kemal Tahir was born in Istanbul on March 13, 1910. His father Tahir Bey was a captain of the Ottoman Navy and an adviser to Sultan Abdul Hamid II. After graduating from Hasan Paşa Rüşdiyesi (secondary school), Kemal Tahir enrolled at Galatasaray High School. But after his mother's death, he dropped out of high school in the tenth grade and began working as a lawyer's clerk. Later, he worked as a journalist, editor and translator at Vakit, Haber and Son Posta newspapers in İstanbul as well as a page editor at Karikatür and Yeni Gün newspapers. He became lead writer for the newspaper Karagöz and later worked as the editor-in-chief at Tan.

In 1938, Kemal Tahir and Nazım Hikmet were accused of "spreading sedition" amongst the armed forces by the Navy Command Court Martial. Tahir was found guilty and sentenced to 15 years in prison. He served time in Çankırı, Malatya, Çorum, Nevşehir and Kırşehir prisons. After twelve years, he was released in the general amnesty of 1950.

Following his release, Kemal Tahir returned to Istanbul and started working as the Istanbul correspondent of İzmir Ticaret newspaper. He also wrote romance and adventure novels and film scripts, using aliases such as "Körduman", "Bedri Eser", "Samim Aşkın", "f. m. ikinci", "Nurettin Demir" and "Ali Gıcırlı", and undertook translations from French. He was taken into custody again following the 6–7 September incidents in 1955 and served six months in the Harbiye military prison. Following his release, he ran Düşün Publishing which he co-founded with the writer Aziz Nesin.

He worked on film scripts with directors such as Metin Erksan, Halit Refiğ and Atıf Yılmaz.

He travelled to the USSR in 1968.

After a lung operation in 1970, Tahir worked on vernacularising Marxist terminology and creating a national left ideology to suit a Turkish-Anatolian socio-cultural identity even though he was criticised for doing this by many left-wing intellectuals. During a particularly heated debate, he suffered a heart attack and died on April 21, 1973.

Kemal Tahir was married twice, first to Fatma İrfan in 1937 and then to Semiha Sıdıka in 1950.

== Ideology ==
The foundation of Kemal Tahir's ideology can be broadly described as Marxist. As a writer and a political activist, he saw a contradiction between the socio-cultural and political structure of Turkey and the solutions that Marxism offered. Believing that Westernisation did not quite suit Turkish society, he found Marxism somewhat lacking. Marxist historical theory is based on the existence of a bourgeois class, something that did not develop in the Ottoman Empire (as in many other 'peripheral countries'). He also didn't believe that feodalism never happened in the Ottoman Empire as it happened in the West. Perhaps the greatest intellectual struggle of Tahir's life was to reshape Marxist historical theory to fit the reality of Turkish history.

After studying Marx and Engels' opinions about eastern societies, Kemal Tahir worked on the theories of historians and sociologists like Ömer Lütfi Barkan, Mustafa Akdağ, Halil İnalcık, Niyazi Berkes and Şerif Mardin. His conclusion was that Ottoman-Turkish society did not follow the Eurocentric primitive/slavery/feodality/capitalism socio-historical model. Instead it had its own special evolution process, structural differences, dynamics and conditions based on its cultural and social structure. So Westernisation, whether in the form of capitalism or communism, was trying to bring an abstract and formal superstructure to a society which did not have the necessary substructure. Without a fundamental economic and social revolution he reasoned that this kind of exercise would be only an absurd mimicry.

Within the framework of this ideology, Kemal Tahir aimed to describe Ottoman society in his works which were based on a humanist foundation very different from European feudal and later capitalist society. He tried to emphasise a "Turkish reality" in his novels.

In a writing career based on socio-realist lines, he used simple language enriched with dialogue and charismatic characters. He was one of the most productive novelists of Turkish literature.

== Works ==
Kemal Tahir started out writing poetry. His first poems were published in İçtihad magazine in 1931. Later, his poems were published in the Yeni Kültür, Geçit, Var and Ses magazines.

His first major work was a four-part novella published in Tan newspaper and later published as Göl İnsanları (People of The Lake) in 1955. In 1955, he became well known for his novel Sağırdere (Deaf River).

Published in 1956, Esir Şehrin İnsanları (People of the Captive City) was the first of his city novels in which he took İstanbul as a frame within which to observe the Turks' transition from the Ottoman Empire to the Republic. İn this novel, Tahir described İstanbul under occupation after the World War I. Esir Şehrin Mahpusu (Prisoner of the Captive City), published in 1961, and Yol Ayrımı (Parting of the Ways), published in 1971, were sequels to this novel.

At first, Kemal Tahir focused on the problems of the peasantry. Then, he dealt with Turkish history, especially the events of recent history. In his novel Devlet Ana (Mother State) he described the governmental and social structure of Ottoman society in its beginnings; in Kurt Kanunu (Law of the Wolf), he narrated the İzmir assassination incident, a failed attempt to kill Atatürk; in Rahmet Yolları Kesti (Rain Closed the Roads) he analysed the banditry phenomenon; and in Yedi Çınar Yaylası (Seven Plane Tree Plateau)," he explored the ağa" system. İn his historical novel Yorgun Savaşçı (Tired Warrior), Tahir described the period when the leaderless national resistance forces in Anatolia came together and started the Turkish Independence War.

Due to financial difficulties, Kemal Tahir also wrote pulp fiction using pseudonyms. He also translated Mike Hammer novels and even wrote original new novels for that series.

Some of his novels (like Karılar Koğuşu, Haremde Dört Kadın, Esir Şehrin İnsanları and Kurt Kanunu) were later adapted into movies.

== Complete list of fiction ==
- Göl İnsanları (stories) (1955)
- Sağırdere (1955)
- Esir Şehrin İnsanları (1956)
- Körduman (1957)
- Rahmet Yolları Kesti (1957)
- Yedi Çınar Yaylası (1958)
- Köyün Kamburu (1959)
- Esir Şehrin Mahpusu (1961)
- Bozkırdaki Çekirdek (1962)
- Kelleci Memet (1962)
- Yorgun Savaşçı (1965)
- Devlet Ana (1967)
- Kurt Kanunu (1969)
- Büyük Mal (1970)
- Yol Ayrımı (1971)
- Namusçular (1974)
- Karılar Koğuşu (1974)
- Hür Şehrin İnsanları (1976)
- Damağası (1977)
- Bir Mülkiyet Kalesi (1977)
