= Lazistan =

Lazistan Lazona
- Historical region
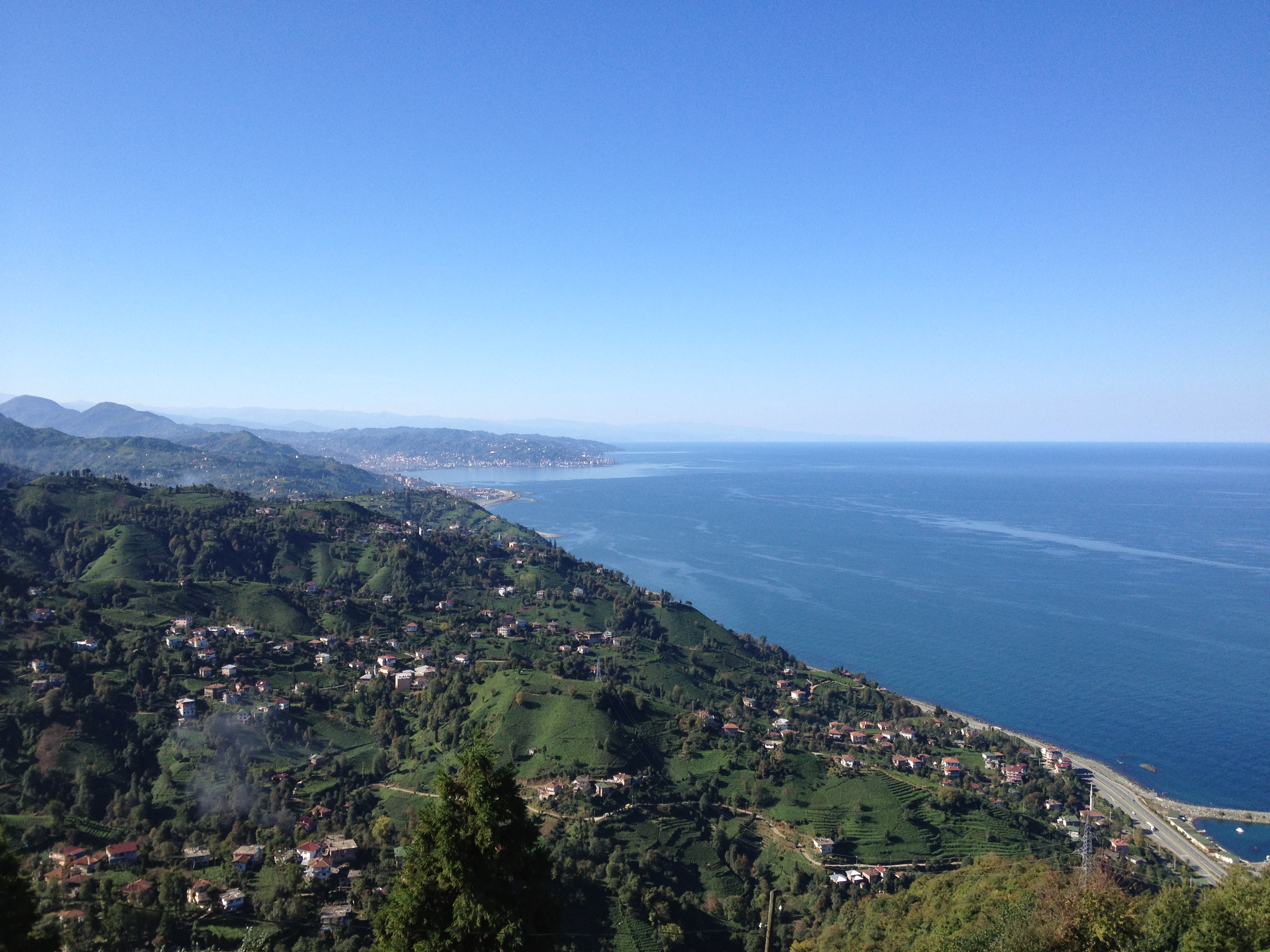

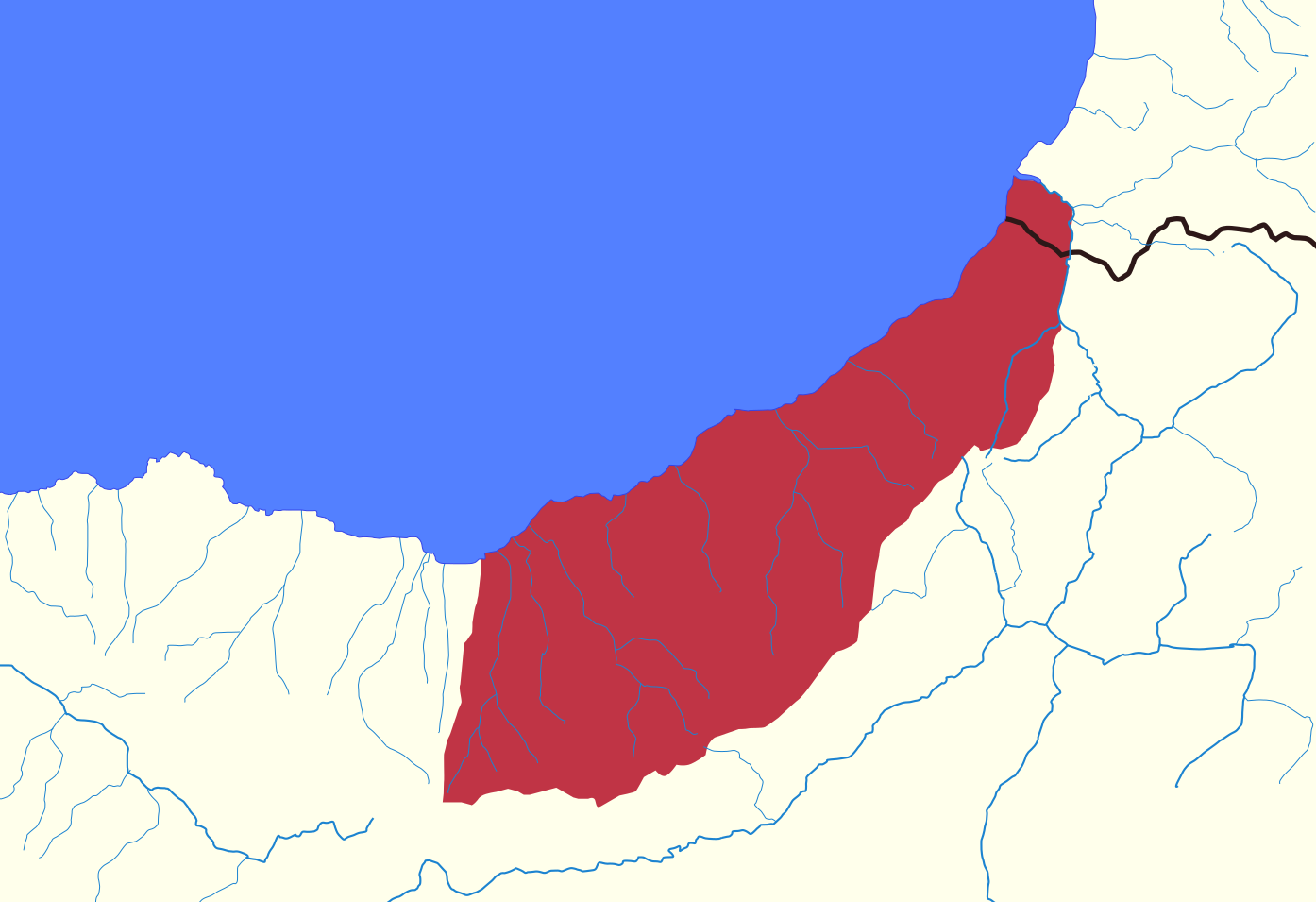
- Historical Lazistan
- Coordinates: 40°55′54″N 40°50′52″E
- Country: Georgia; Turkey
- Largest city: Rize
- Lazistan is not an official subdivision of either Georgia or Turkey; it constitutes a historical region only.

Lazistan or Lazeti (Laz: ლაზონა, romanized: Lazona; Georgian: ლაზეთი, romanized: lazeti, or ჭანეთი, ch'aneti; Ottoman Turkish: لازستان, romanized: Lazistān) is a historical and cultural region of the Caucasus and Anatolia; the term was primarily used during Ottoman rule in the region. Traditionally inhabited by the Laz people and located mostly in Turkey, with small parts in Georgia, its area is about 7,000 km^{2} (2,703 sq mi) with a modern-day population of around 500,000 (including groups outside of the Laz peoples).

Geographically, Lazistan consists of a series of narrow, rugged valleys extending northward from the crest of the Pontic Alps (Turkish: Kuzey Anadolu Dağları, Pontik Alpleri), which separate it from the Çoruh Valley, and stretches east–west along the southern shore of the Black Sea. The term “Lazistan” has no longer been in use in Turkey or Georgia since the collapse of the Ottoman Empire. The designation and official use of the name Lazistan was banned in 1926 by the government of the Republic of Turkey.

== Etymology ==
The ethnonym "Laz" is linked to a Svan toponym Lazan (i.e. the territorial prefix la- + Zan, "land of the Zan"). The suffix -stan (Persian: ـستان, translit. stân) is Persian for region. The literal translation is, thus, "Region of the Laz". "Lazistan" has also been referred to Lazica or Lazia.

== See also ==
- Lazistan Sanjak
