= 3rd Chamber of Deputies of the Ottoman Empire =

History
- Founded: 17 December 1908
- Disbanded: 17 January 1912
- Preceded by: 2nd Chamber of Deputies
- Succeeded by: 4th Chamber of Deputies

Leadership
- President of the Chamber of Deputies: Ahmet Rıza
- Vice-president of the Chamber of Deputies: Ruhi al-Khalidi, Mehmet Talat
- Seats: 275 deputies

Elections
- Voting system: Electoral college
- Last election: December 1908
- Next election: April 1912

The Third Chamber of Deputies of the Ottoman Empire was elected in the 1908 Ottoman general election, which was called following the Young Turk Revolution. The new parliament consisted of 147 Turks, 60 Arabs, 27 Albanians, 26 Greeks (Rum), 14 Armenians, 10 Slavs, and four Jews. Including the amount of deputies elected in by-elections, the total amount of seats included 288 deputies. On 17 January 1912, through an imperial decree, the Sultan Mehmed V dissolved the Chamber of Deputies and called for new elections within three months.

Ethnic composition of the 1908 Ottoman parliament Turks: 147 seats Arabs: 60 seats Albanians: 27 seats Greeks: 26 seats Armenians: 14 seats Slavs: 10 seats Jews: 4 seats

== Members ==
Vilayet	Electoral District/Sancak	Deputy	Party	Ethnicity
Kosovo	Prishtina	Mustafa Hamdi Efendi (Note: Died)	Union and Progress	Albanian
Kosovo	Prishtina	Hasan Prishtina	Union and Progress	Albanian
Kosovo	Prishtina	Sava Stojanović	Serbian Democratic League	Slav (Serb)
Kosovo	Prishtina	Shaban Pasha (Note: Elected as deputy of Pristina in deceased deputy Hamdi Efendi's place)	Independent	Albanian
Kosovo	Prishtina	Hysen Fuad Pasha	Independent	Albanian
Kosovo	İpek (Peja)	Hafız İbrahim (Zaimoğlu)	Union and Progress	Turk
Kosovo	İpek (Peja)	Bedri Pejani	Independent	Albanian
Kosovo	İpek (Peja)	Ahmed Hamdi Efendi	Independent	Albanian
Kosovo	İpek (Peja)	Ali Haydar Efendi	Independent	Albanian
Kosovo	Seniçe (Sjenica)	Hasan Muhiddin Efendi	Independent	Albanian
Kosovo	Taşlıça (Pljevlja)	Ali Vasfi Bey	Independent	Albanian
Kosovo	Üsküp (Skopye)	Todor Pavlov	Bulgarian Constitutional Clubs	Slav (Bulgarian)
Kosovo	Üsküp (Skopye)	Aleksander Pavlos Efendi	Independent	Rum
Kosovo	Üsküp (Skopye)	Mehmet Nexhip Draga	Independent	Albanian
Kosovo	Üsküp (Skopye)	Hoxha Said Efendi	Unknown	Albanian
Scutari	Scutari (Shkodër)	Murtaza Galip	Independent	Albanian
Scutari	Scutari (Shkodër)	Reza Bey (Note: Elected as deputy from Scutari in deceased deputy Şakir Bey's place)	Independent	Albanian
Scutari	Scutari (Shkodër)	Shakir Bey (Note: Died)	Independent	Albanian
Scutari	Draç (Durrës)	Essad Pasha Toptani	Independent	Albanian
Yanya	Yanya (Ioannina)	Dimitraki Kingos Efendi	Independent	Rum
Yanya	Yanya (Ioannina)	Konstantin Sorla Efendi	Independent	Rum
Yanya	Delvina (Gjirokastër)	Mamapulos Efendi	Independent	Rum
Yanya	Delvina (Gjirokastër)	Mufid Libohova	Independent	Albanian
Yanya	Avlona (Berat)	Ismail Qemali	Independent	Albanian
Yanya	Avlona (Berat)	Aziz Pasha Vrioni	Independent	Albanian
Yanya	Çamlık (Preveza)	Mustafa Ömer Azmi (Akalın) (Note: Became Hüdavendigâr Vilayet governor)	Union and Progress	Turk
Yanya	Çamlık (Preveza)	Hamdi Çami (Note: Replaced Azmi Bey as deputy from Preveza)	Independent	Albanian
Monastir	Monastir (Bitola)	Pancho Dorev	Bulgarian Constitutional Clubs	Bulgarian
Monastir	Monastir (Bitola)	Ali Vasfi Bey	Independent	Albanian
Monastir	Monastir (Bitola)	Mehmed Vasıf	Independent	Albanian
Monastir	Monastir (Bitola)	Traianos Nallis	Independent	Rum
Monastir	Monastir (Bitola)	Janko Dimitrović	Independent	Slav (Serb)
Monastir	Görice (Korçë)	Shahin Teki Kolonja	Independent	Albanian
Monastir	Görice (Korçë)	Filip Mișea	Independent	Slav (Aromanian)
Monastir	Debre (Debar)	Basri Bey Dukagjini	Independent	Albanian
Monastir	Debre (Debar)	Shefqet (Enön) Bey (Note: Elected as deputy from Debre in deceased deputy İsmail Bey's place)	Independent	Albanian
Monastir	Debre (Debar)	Ismail Bey (Note: Died)	Independent	Albanian
Monastir	Prizren	Prezrinli Yaliya Bey	Independent	Albanian
Monastir	Prizren	Mehmet Emin Efendi (Note: Resigned)	Independent	Albanian
Monastir	Prizren	Suleyman Sherif Efendi	Independent	Albanian
Monastir	Prizren	Vehbi Efendi (Note: Elected as deputy from Prizren in Mehmet Emin Efendi's place)	Unknown	Albanian
Monastir	Elbasan	Hoxha Ali Efendi	Union and Progress	Albanian
Monastir	Elbasan	Abdullah Mahir	Independent	Albanian
Monastir	Serfiğe (Servia)	Georgios Busios	Socialist Party	Rum
Monastir	Serfiğe (Servia)	Harisiyos Vamvakas (Note: Elected deputy from Serfiçe in Konstantinos Drizis' place)	Independent	Rum
Monastir	Serfiğe (Servia)	Konstantinos Drizis (Note: Resigned)	Independent	Rum
Salonica	Selanik (Thessaloniki)	Mehmed Cavid	Union and Progress	Turk
Salonica	Selanik (Thessaloniki)	Mustafa Rahmi (Arslan)	Union and Progress	Turk
Salonica	Selanik (Thessaloniki)	Emmanuel Karasu	Union and Progress	Jewish
Salonica	Selanik (Thessaloniki)	Dimitar Vlahof	People's Federative Party	Slav (Bulgarian)
Salonica	Selanik (Thessaloniki)	Yorgaki Artas	Independent	Rum
Salonica	Selanik (Thessaloniki)	Georgios Huneyos	Independent	Rum
Salonica	Siroz (Serrez)	Midhat Şükrü (Bleda)	Union and Progress	Turk
Salonica	Siroz (Serrez)	Derviş Ragıp Bey (Note: Elected as deputy from Siroz in Yusuf Naşid's place)	Union and Progress	Turk
Salonica	Siroz (Serrez)	Haristo Dalchev	People's Federative Party	Slav (Bulgarian)
Salonica	Siroz (Serrez)	Dimitrios Dinkas	Independent	Rum
Salonica	Siroz (Serrez)	Yusuf Naşid Bey (Note: Resigned)	Independent	Turk
Salonica	Drama	Rıza Bey	Union and Progress	Turk
Salonica	Drama	Agâh Bey	Independent	Turk
Adrianople	Gümülcine (Komotini)	İsmail Hakkı	Union and Progress	Turk
Adrianople	Gümülcine (Komotini)	Mehmed Arif Bey	Union and Progress	Turk
Adrianople	Gümülcine (Komotini)	Mehmed Fehmi	Independent	Turk
Adrianople	Dedeağaç (Alexandroupoli)	Süleyman Bey	Union and Progress	Turk
Adrianople	Gelibolu	Trayan Narlı Efendi	Independent	Armenian
Adrianople	Rodosto (Tekirdağ)	Hacı Mehmet Adil (Arda)	Union and Progress	Turk
Adrianople	Rodosto (Tekirdağ)	Agop Boyacıyan (Note: Elected as deputy from Rodosto in Agop Babikyan's place)	Union and Progress	Armenian
Adrianople	Rodosto (Tekirdağ)	Agop Babikyan (Note: Died)	Independent	Armenian
Adrianople	Adrianople (Edirne)	Mehmed Faik (Kaltakkıran) (Note: Elected as deputy from Adrianople in Asım Bey's place)	Union and Progress	Turk
Adrianople	Adrianople (Edirne)	Mehmed Talat	Union and Progress	Turk
Adrianople	Adrianople (Edirne)	Rıza Tevfik (Bölükbaşı)	Union and Progress	Turk
Adrianople	Adrianople (Edirne)	Asım (Note: Died)	Independent	Turk
Adrianople	Kırkkilise (Kırklareli)	Emrullah	Union and Progress	Turk
Adrianople	Kırkkilise (Kırklareli)	Mustafa Arif (Deymer)	Union and Progress	Turk
Independent	Çatalca	Dimitri Zafiropulos	Independent	Rum
Constantinople	Constantinople (İstanbul)	Mustafa Asım (Yörük)	Union and Progress	Turk
Constantinople	Constantinople (İstanbul)	Ahmed Nesimi (Sayman)	Union and Progress	Turk
Constantinople	Constantinople (İstanbul)	Manyasizade Refik (Note: Died on 4 March 1909)	Union and Progress	Turk
Constantinople	Constantinople (İstanbul)	Mehmed Rifat Pasha (Note: Elected as deputy from Constantinople in Manyasizade Refik's place)	Union and Progress	Turk
Constantinople	Constantinople (İstanbul)	Ahmet Rıza (Note: Became a Senator on 23 February 1912)	Union and Progress	Turk
Constantinople	Constantinople (İstanbul)	Hüseyin Cahid (Yalçın)	Union and Progress	Turk
Constantinople	Constantinople (İstanbul)	Vitali Hayim Faraggi	Union and Progress	Jewish
Constantinople	Constantinople (İstanbul)	Bedros Hallaçyan	Union and Progress	Armenian
Constantinople	Constantinople (İstanbul)	Krikor Zohrab	Liberty Party	Armenian
Constantinople	Constantinople (İstanbul)	Pandelâki Kozmidi	Liberty Party	Rum
Constantinople	Constantinople (İstanbul)	Tahir Hayreddin (Note: Elected as Freedom and Accord Party's candidate in the İstanbul by-election of December 1911)	Freedom and Accord Party	Arab
Constantinople	Constantinople (İstanbul)	Konstantin Konstantinidi Efendi	Independent	Rum
Independent	İzmit	Hazız Rüşdü Bey	Independent	Turk
Independent	İzmit	Ahmed Müfid (Saner)	Independent	Turk
Independent	İzmit	Anastas Mihailidis	Independent	Rum
Hüdavendigâr	Bursa	Hacı Ömer Feyzi	Union and Progress	Turk
Hüdavendigâr	Bursa	Mehmet Tahir	Union and Progress	Turk
Hüdavendigâr	Bursa	Hafız Ahmet Hamdi	Independent	Turk
Hüdavendigâr	Bursa	Hayri Bey	Independent	Turk
Hüdavendigâr	Bursa	Abdullah Sabri Efendi	Independent	Turk
Hüdavendigâr	Ertugrul (Bilecik)	Mehmet Sıktı Bey	Union and Progress	Turk
Hüdavendigâr	Ertugrul (Bilecik)	Mehmed Sadık	Independent	Turk
Hüdavendigâr	Karahisarı Sahib (Afyon)	Rıza Pasha	Union and Progress	Turk
Hüdavendigâr	Karahisarı Sahib (Afyon)	Hoca Kamil (Miras)	Independent	Turk
Hüdavendigâr	Karahisarı Sahib (Afyon)	Salim Efendi	Independent	Turk
Hüdavendigâr	Kütahya	Abdullah Azmi	Union and Progress	Turk
Hüdavendigâr	Kütahya	Ahmed Ferid (Tek)	Union and Progress	Turk
Hüdavendigâr	Kütahya	Hasan Tahsin (Aynî)	Independent	Turk
Hüdavendigâr	Kütahya	Hatibzade Ahmed Cemal Bey (Note: Elected as deputy from Kütahya in Mustafa Saffet Pasha's place)	Independent	Turk
Hüdavendigâr	Kütahya	Kitapsız Mustafa Saffet Pasha (Note: Resigned)	Independent	Turk
Independent	Biga	İsmetzade Mehmed Arif (Note: Died)	Union and Progress	Turk
Independent	Biga	Atıf (Kamçıl) (Note: Elected as deputy from Biga in Arif Ismet Bey's place)	Union and Progress	Turk
Independent	Biga	Timurcuzade Mustafa Bey (Note: Elected as deputy from Biga in Seyyid Ali Rıza Efendi's place)	Independent	Turk
Independent	Biga	Seyyid Ali Rıza Bey (Note: Died)	Independent	Turk
Archipelago	Limni (Lemnos)	Mihail Stellios	Independent	Rum
Archipelago	Midilli (Lesbos)	Panayot Bostani Efendi	Independent	Rum
Archipelago	Midilli (Lesbos)	Mihail Saltas	Independent	Rum
Archipelago	Sakız (Chios)	Mihailki Chelebidi Efendi	Independent	Rum
Archipelago	Rhodes	Theodor Konstantidis	Independent	Rum
Aydın	Menteşe (Muğla)	Milâslı Halil (Menteşe)	Union and Progress	Turk
Aydın	Menteşe (Muğla)	Hamza Hayati (Öztürk)	Independent	Turk
Aydın	Denizli	Fraşirili Gani	Union and Progress	Turk
Aydın	Denizli	Ahmed Muhib Efendi	Independent	Turk
Aydın	Aydın	Mehmet Übeydullah (Hatipoğlu)	Union and Progress	Turk
Aydın	Aydın	Hacı Süleyman (Bilgen) (Note: Resigned)	Independent	Turk
Aydın	Aydın	İsmail Sıtkı (Erboy) (Note: Elected as deputy from Aydın in Hocazade Süleyman's place)	Independent	Turk
Aydın	Smyrna (İzmir)	Nesim Mazliyah	Union and Progress	Jewish
Aydın	Smyrna (İzmir)	Aristidi Pasha (Yorgancıoğlu) (Note: Became a Senator 31 February 1911)	Union and Progress	Rum
Aydın	Smyrna (İzmir)	Emmanouil Emmanouilidis (Note: Elected as deputy from Aydın in Aristidi Pasha's place)	Union and Progress	Rum
Aydın	Smyrna (İzmir)	Pavlos Karolidis	Union and Progress	Rum
Aydın	Smyrna (İzmir)	Mehmed Seyyid	Union and Progress	Turk
Aydın	Smyrna (İzmir)	Mehmed Said	Independent	Turk
Aydın	Smyrna (İzmir)	Istepan Ispartalıyan	Independent	Armenian
Aydın	Saruhan (Manisa)	Haydar	Union and Progress	Turk
Aydın	Saruhan (Manisa)	Mensurizade Said	Union and Progress	Turk
Aydın	Saruhan (Manisa)	İlhami (Dinçer)	Independent	Turk
Aydın	Saruhan (Manisa)	Tokadizade Şekib	Independent	Turk
Independent	Karesi (Balıkesir)	Abdülaziz Mecdi (Tolun)	Socialist Party	Turk
Independent	Karesi (Balıkesir)	Hacı Ali Galib	Independent	Turk
Independent	Karesi (Balıkesir)	Helvacızade Muharrem Hasbi	Independent	Turk
Independent	Karesi (Balıkesir)	Şefik Bey (Note: Appointed as a member to the Court of Appeals)	Independent	Turk
Independent	Karesi (Balıkesir)	İbrahim Vasfi	Independent	Turk
Independent	Karesi (Balıkesir)	Konstantin Savopoulos (Note: Elected as deputy from Karesi in Şefik Bey's place)	Independent	Rum
Konya	Konya	Muhammed Zeynelabidin	Union and Progress	Turk
Konya	Konya	Hacı Salim Efendi	Independent	Turk
Konya	Konya	Mehmed Emin Efendi	Independent	Turk
Konya	Konya	Mustafa Efendi	Independent	Turk
Konya	Konya	Mehmed Vehbi (Çelik)	Independent	Turk
Konya	Hamid-i Abad (Isparta)	Hacı Eşref Bey	Independent	Turk
Konya	Hamid-i Abad (Isparta)	Böcüzâde Süleyman Sami	Independent	Turk
Konya	Burdur	Muhaddeszade Ömer Lütfi	Independent	Turk
Konya	Antalya	Ebüzziya Tevfik	Independent	Turk
Konya	Antalya	Mehmed Hamdi (Yazır)	Independent	Turk
Kastamonu	Kastamonu	Necmeddin Molla (Kocataş) (Note: Elected as deputy from Kastamonu in Yusuf Kemal's place)	Union and Progress	Turk
Kastamonu	Kastamonu	Ahmet Mahir (Ballı)	Union and Progress	Turk
Kastamonu	Kastamonu	İsmail Mahir	Union and Progress	Turk
Kastamonu	Kastamonu	Ahmed Şükrü (Bayındar)	Union and Progress	Turk
Kastamonu	Kastamonu	Yusuf Kemal (Tengirşek) (Note: Resigned)	Union and Progress	Turk
Kastamonu	Çankırı	Mehmed Behçet (Kutlu)	Union and Progress	Turk
Kastamonu	Sinop	Hasan Fehmi (Tümerkan)	Union and Progress	Turk
Kastamonu	Sinop	Rıza Nur	Independent	Turk
Independent	Bolu	Mehmet Habip	Union and Progress	Turk
Independent	Bolu	Hacı Abdülvehab (Öner)	Independent	Turk
Independent	Bolu	Şerefettin Bey	Independent	Turk
Independent	Bolu	Mustafa Zeki Efendi	Independent	Turk
Ankara	Ankara	Hacı Mustafa	Union and Progress	Turk
Ankara	Ankara	Mehmet Talât (Sönmez)	Union and Progress	Turk
Ankara	Ankara	Mahir Said (Pekmen)	Liberty Party	Turk
Ankara	Ankara	Kasım Nuri	Independent	Turk
Ankara	Niğde	Ürgüplü Mustafa Hayri	Union and Progress	Turk
Ankara	Niğde	Fahreddin Efendi (Kurtoğlu?)	Independent	Turk
Ankara	Niğde	Muhiddin Bey	Independent	Turk
Ankara	Niğde	Georgios Kourtoglou	Independent	Rum
Ankara	Kayseri	Hacı Kasım	Independent	Turk
Ankara	Kayseri	İmamzade Ömer Mümtaz	Independent	Turk
Ankara	Kırşehir	Ali Rıza (Benli)	Independent	Turk
Ankara	Kırşehir	Mahmud Mahir	Independent	Turk
Ankara	Yozgat	Edip	Independent	Turk
Ankara	Yozgat	Hayrullah	Independent	Turk
Ankara	Çorum	Mehmet Münir (Çağıl)	Union and Progress	Turk
Ankara	Çorum	Ali Osman Efendi	Union and Progress	Turk
Adana	Adana	Ali Münif (Yeğenağa) (Note: Appointed governor of Ankara)	Union and Progress	Turk
Adana	Adana	Abdullah Faik (Çopuroğlu) (Note: Elected deputy from Adana in Ali Münif's place)	Independent	Turk
Adana	Cebelibereket (Dörtyol)	Mehmed Reşid Bey	Independent	Turk
Adana	Kozan	Hampartsoum Boyadjian	Hunchakian Party	Armenian
Adana	İçel	Mahmud Bayram Efendi	Independent	Turk
Adana	Mersin	Abdülhalim Bey (Note: Elected deputy from Mersin in Arif Hikmet Bey's place)	Independent	Turk
Adana	Mersin	Arif Hikmet Bey (Note: Died)	Independent	Turk
Independent	Canik (Samsun)	Mustafa Nail (Note: Appointed to the Senate 21 February 1911)	Union and Progress	Turk
Independent	Canik (Samsun)	Said Efendi (Note: Elected deputy from Samsun in Abdullah Efendi's place)	Union and Progress	Turk
Independent	Canik (Samsun)	Süleyman Necmi (Selman) (Note: Elected Deputy from Sansum in Mustafa Nail's place)	Union and Progress	Turk
Independent	Canik (Samsun)	Abdullah Bey (Note: Appointed to the Court of Cessation)	Independent	Turk
Independent	Canik (Samsun)	Mehmed Ali	Independent	Turk
Independent	Canik (Samsun)	Hacı Ahmed Hamdi Efendi	Independent	Turk
Sivas	Amasya	Arif Fazıl	Union and Progress	Turk
Sivas	Amasya	İbrahim Cudi	Independent	Turk
Sivas	Amasya	İsmail Hakkı Pasha	Independent	Turk
Sivas	Tokat	Hoca Mustafa Sabri	Union and Progress	Turk
Sivas	Tokat	Sheikh Hacı Mustafa Hakkı	Independent	Turk
Sivas	Tokat	Hattatzade İsmail Pasha	Independent	Turk
Sivas	Karahisar-ı Şarkı (Şebinkarahisar)	Ömer Feyzi	Independent	Turk
Sivas	Karahisar-ı Şarkı (Şebinkarahisar)	Sardarzade Mustafa	Independent	Turk
Sivas	Sivas	Nazaret Daghavarian	Armenakan Party	Armenian
Sivas	Sivas	Ahmed Şükrü Efendi	Independent	Turk
Sivas	Sivas	Dr. Hüsnü Bey	Independent	Turk
Sivas	Sivas	Dr. Ömer Şevki (Purut)	Independent	Turk
Sivas	Sivas	Mustafa Ziya Bey	Independent	Turk
Independent	Urfa (Şanlıurfa)	Shaykh Saffet (Yetkin)	Union and Progress	Turk
Independent	Urfa (Şanlıurfa)	Mehmed Nadim Bey	Independent	Turk
Diyarbekir	Diyarbakır	Pirinççizade Arif (Note: Died 14 March 1909)	Independent	Kurd
Diyarbekir	Diyarbakır	Pirinççizade Aziz Feyzi (Note: Elected deputy from Diyarbakır in Pirinççizade Arif's place)	Independent	Kurd
Diyarbekir	Siverek	Nurettin Bey	Independent	Turk
Diyarbekir	Ergani	İstefan Çıracıyan	Independent	Armenian
Diyarbekir	Ergani	İbrahim Efendi	Independent	Turk
Diyarbekir	Mardin	Said Bey	Independent	Turk
Memuretulaziz	Malatya	Ahmed Hamid (Note: Died)	Independent	Turk
Memuretulaziz	Malatya	Keşşaf Efendi (Note: Elected deputy from Malatya in Ahmed Hamid Bey's place)	Independent	Turk
Memuretulaziz	Malatya	Mehmed Tevfik Efendi	Independent	Turk
Memuretulaziz	Memuretulaziz (Elazığ)	Çötelizade Asım	Independent	Turk
Memuretulaziz	Memuretulaziz (Elazığ)	Hacı Mehmed Nuri	Independent	Turk
Memuretulaziz	Memuretulaziz (Elazığ)	Hacı Ziyaeddin	Independent	Turk
Memuretulaziz	Dersim (Tunceli)	Ömer Lütfi Fikri	Independent	Kurd
Trabzon	Gümüşhane	İbrahim Lütfi Pasha	Independent	Turk
Trabzon	Gümüşhane	Hayri Efendi	Independent	Turk
Trabzon	Trabzon	Ali Osman (Güley) Bey	Union and Progress	Turk
Trabzon	Trabzon	Mehmed Emin Efendi	Independent	Turk
Trabzon	Trabzon	Mahmud Mazhar Bey	Independent	Turk
Trabzon	Trabzon	Mahmud İmameddin (Note: Died)	Independent	Turk
Trabzon	Trabzon	Eyüboğlu İzzet	Independent	Turk
Trabzon	Trabzon	Saraçzade Ali Naki Efendi (Note: As the oldest deputy, he was the provisional president of the Chamber of Deputies)	Independent	Turk
Trabzon	Trabzon	Falcızade Mahmud (Note: Elected deputy from Trabzon in Mahmud İmameddin's place)	Independent	Turk
Trabzon	Trabzon	Matthaios Kofidis	Independent	Rum
Trabzon	Lazistan (Rize)	Çürüksulu Ahmet Pasha	Independent	Turk
Trabzon	Lazistan (Rize)	İbrahim Ferid Efendi	Independent	Turk
Erzurum	Erzurum	Karakin Pastermadjian	Armenian Revolutionary Federation	Armenian
Erzurum	Erzurum	Vartkes Serengülian	Armenian Revolutionary Federation	Armenian
Erzurum	Erzurum	Hafizzade Seyfullah (Topdağı)	Independent	Turk
Erzurum	Erzurum	Şevket Bey	Independent	Turk
Erzurum	Erzurum	Hafız Ahmet Ziya	Independent	Kurd
Erzurum	Bayazıt	Süleyman Sudi (Acarbay)	Union and Progress	Turk
Erzurum	Erzincan	Osman Fevzi (Topçu)	Independent	Turk
Bitlis	Genç (Bingöl)	Mehmed Emin	Independent	Turk
Bitlis	Muş	Gegham Ter-Karapetian	Armenian Revolutionary Federation	Armenian
Bitlis	Muş	Hacı İlyas Sami	Union and Progress	Turk
Bitlis	Bitlis	Arif Efendi	Independent	Turk
Bitlis	Siirt	Abdürrezak Efendi	Independent	Turk
Van	Van	Vahan Papazian	Armenian Revolutionary Federation	Armenian
Van	Van	Tevfik Efendi	Independent	Turk
Van	Hakkari	Sayyid Taha Efendi	Independent	Arab
Independent	Zor	Hızır Lütfi Efendi	Independent	Turk
Aleppo	Aleppo	Artin Boşgezenyan (Note: Elected deputy from Aleppo in Mustafa Bey's place)	Union and Progress	Armenian
Aleppo	Aleppo	Mehmet Ali Cenani	Union and Progress	Turk
Aleppo	Aleppo	Halebli Sheikh Mustafa (Note: Appointed to the council of state)	Union and Progress	Arab
Aleppo	Aleppo	Hajji Sait Abdulnafi Pasha (Note: First member of parliament made Sheik-ül-İslam)	Independent	Arab
Aleppo	Aleppo	Rifat Bey (Bereketoğlu) (Note: Died)	Independent	Arab
Aleppo	Aleppo	Amirizade Muhammed Baha al-din (Note: Elected deputy from Aleppo in Mellahzade Meri Pasha's place)	Independent	Arab
Aleppo	Aleppo	Sheikh Beshir al-Ghazi (Note: Elected deputy from Aleppo in Rıfat Bey's place)	Independent	Arab
Aleppo	Aleppo	Mari Pasha al-Mallah (Note: Appointed Aleppo branch of Evkaf Ministry)	Independent	Arab
Aleppo	Aleppo	Mesud Efendi	Independent	Arab
Aleppo	Marash (Kahramanmaraş)	Hacı Hasan Fehmi	Independent	Turk
Aleppo	Marash (Kahramanmaraş)	Bayezidzade Mehmet Şükrü	Independent	Turk
Aleppo	Marash (Kahramanmaraş)	Vahan Efendi	Independent	Armenian
Beirut	Trablusşam (Tripoli, Lebanon)	Fuad Hulusi (Demirelli)	Union and Progress	Turk
Beirut	Beirut	Kamil al-Assad (Note: Elected deputy from Beirut in Suleyman al-Boustani's place)	Union and Progress	Arab
Beirut	Beirut	Riza as-Sulh	Independent	Arab
Beirut	Beirut	Suleyman al-Boustani (Note: Appointed to the Senate 31 February 1911)	Independent	Arab
Beirut	Acre	As'ad Shukeiri	Independent	Arab
Beirut	Nablus	Ahmed Hammash Efendi	Independent	Arab
Beirut	Lazikiye (Latakia)	Muhammed Arslan Bey (Note: Elected deputy from Lazikiye in Emin Adil Aslan Bey's place)	Union and Progress	Arab
Beirut	Lazikiye (Latakia)	Muhammed Mustafa Emir Arslan (Note: Killed in the 31 March Incident)	Independent	Arab
Syria	Damascus	Shukri al-Asali (Note: Elected deputy from Damascus in Mehmet Aclanî Efendi's place)	Independent	Arab
Syria	Damascus	Shafiq Muayyad al-Azm	Independent	Arab
Syria	Damascus	Rushdi al-Shama	Independent	Arab
Syria	Damascus	Abdurrahman Al Yusuf (Note: Elected deputy from Damascus in Çuhadarzade Süleyman's place)	Independent	Arab
Syria	Damascus	Chuhadarzade Sulayman (Note: Died)	Independent	Arab
Syria	Damascus	Muhammad Ajlani Efendi (Note: Died)	Independent	Arab
Syria	Hama	Abdul Hamid al-Zahrawi	Union and Progress	Arab
Syria	Hama	Khalid al-Berazi Bey	Independent	Arab
Syria	Homs	Mustafa bin Kaddawe Bey	Independent	Arab
Syria	Havran (Hebron)	Mikdatzâde Saadettin	Independent	Arab
Syria	Karak	Tawfiq al-Mejali Efendi	Independent	Arab
Independent	Jerusalem	Ruhi al-Khalidi	Union and Progress	Arab
Independent	Jerusalem	Hafiz as-Said Efendi	Independent	Arab
Independent	Jerusalem	Said al-Huseyini	Independent	Arab
Independent	Jerusalem	Tahir al-Husayini Bey	Independent	Arab
Hejaz	Hejaz	Sharif Abdullah bin Al-Hussein	Independent	Arab
Hejaz	Hejaz	Hasan Sheybi Efendi	Independent	Arab
Hejaz	Jeddah	Qasim Zeynel Efendi	Independent	Arab
Independent	Medina	Abdul Qadir Hashmi Efendi	Independent	Arab
Yemen	Asir	Sheikh Ahmed Efendi (Note: Died)	Independent	Arab
Yemen	Asir	Ali bin Hassan Efendi	Independent	Arab
Yemen	Asir	Ferraj Said Bey	Independent	Turk
Yemen	Taiz	Sheikh Salih Senidar Efendi	Independent	Arab
Yemen	Sanaa	Sharif Hussein bin Ali Pasha	Independent	Arab
Yemen	Sanaa	Said Ali bin Hussein Efendi (Note: Died)	Independent	Arab
Yemen	Sanaa	Said Ahmed Jenani Bey (Note: Elected deputy from Sanaa in Hüseyin El Halili's place)	Independent	Arab
Yemen	Sanaa	Hussein al-Khalili (Note: Resigned)	Independent	Arab
Yemen	Sanaa	Said Ahmed Yahya al-Keysi	Independent	Arab
Yemen	Sanaa	Qadi Muhammed Makhafi Efendi	Independent	Arab
Yemen	Sanaa	Said Ali Muta Efendi	Independent	Arab
Yemen	Sanaa	Hussein Abdul Qadir Bin Ali (Note: Elected deputy from Sanaa in Seyyid Ali Bin Hüseyin Efendi's place)	Unknown	Arab
Yemen	Al Hudaydah	Said Muhammed Abdurrahman (Note: Resigned)	Independent	Arab
Yemen	Al Hudaydah	Hadi al-Rezak Efendi	Independent	Arab
Yemen	Al Hudaydah	Ali Suwayd Efendi	Independent	Arab
Yemen	Al Hudaydah	Mahmud Nedim Bey (Note: Elected deputy of Hudeyda in Abdurrahman Efendi's place)	Independent	Turk
Yemen	Al Hudaydah	Tehir Recep Bey (Note: Resigned)	Independent	Turk
Yemen	Al Hudaydah	Zühdü Efendi (Note: Elected deputy from Hudeyda in Tahir Recep's place)	Independent	Turk
Basra	Basra	Karataşzade Abdülvehap Pasha (Note: Elected deputy from Basra in Ahmed Pasha's place)	Independent	Turk (?)
Basra	Basra	Zehirzade Ahmed Pasha (Note: Died)	Independent	Arab
Basra	Basra	Talib al-Naqib	Independent	Arab
Basra	Müntefik	Ferid Pashazade Abdunmuhsin (Note: Elected deputy from Müntefik in Refet Senevi's place)	Union and Progress	Arab
Basra	Müntefik	Refet Senewi Efendi (Note: Died)	Independent	Arab
Basra	Müntefik	Hızır Efendi	Independent	Turk
Basra	Ammare	Abdul Mejid (Note: Elected deputy from Ammare in Hüsyin el-Alvan's place)	Independent	Arab
Basra	Ammare	Hussein al-Alwan (Note: Considered incapacitated after not attending parliament for two years)	Independent	Arab
Basra	Ammare	Muhammed Kureysh (Note: Elected deputy from Ammare in Mehmed Selim's place)	Independent	Arab
Basra	Ammare	Muhammed Selim (Note: Considered incapacitated after not attending parliament for two years)	Independent	Arab
Baghdad	Kerbala	Abdul Mahdi	Independent	Arab
Baghdad	Baghdad	Sassoon Eskell	Union and Progress	Jewish
Baghdad	Baghdad	Alusizade Ali	Independent	Arab
Baghdad	Baghdad	Babanzâde İsmail Hakkı	Independent	Kurd
Baghdad	Divaniye	Seyyid Mustafa Nuri	Independent	Arab
Baghdad	Divaniye	Beyzade Shawkat Pasha al-Rifat	Independent	Arab
Mosul	Kirkuk	Mehmed Ali	Independent	Turk (?)
Mosul	Kirkuk	Salih Pasha	Independent	Arab
Mosul	Sulaymaniyah	Haji Said	Union and Progress	Arab
Mosul	Mosul	Davud Yusufani	Independent	Assyrian
Mosul	Mosul	Muhammed Ali Fazil	Independent	Arab
Tripolitania	Trablusgarp (Tripoli, Libya)	Ferhad Efendi	Independent	Arab
Tripolitania	Trablusgarp (Tripoli, Libya)	Mahmud Naci (Balkış)	Independent	Turk
Tripolitania	Trablusgarp (Tripoli, Libya)	Sadık Bey	Independent	Turk
Tripolitania	Cebel-i-garbi	Sulayman al-Baruni	Independent	Arab
Tripolitania	Fezzan	Abdülkadir Cami (Baykut)	Union and Progress	Turk
Tripolitania	Fezzan	Hajji Bey	Independent	Arab
Independent	Bengazi	Omar Pasha Mansour El-Kikhia	Independent	Turk
Independent	Bengazi	Yusuf Şetvan	Independent	Turk

== Sources ==
- Ahmad, Feroz; Rustow, Dankwart A. (1976). "İkinci Meşrutiyet Döneminde Meclisler: 1908 - 1918". Güneydoğu Avrupa Araştırmaları Dergisi (4–5). Archived from the original on November 8, 2016 – via Dergi Park.
- Meşrutiyet ve Cumhuriyet mebusları - Hakan Yılmaz (Boğaziçi Üniversitesi)
- https://www.tbmm.gov.tr/tutanaklar/TUTANAK/MECMEB/mmbd01ic01c001/mmbd01ic01c001ink001.pdf
- Rustow, Feroz Ahmad A. (8 March 2012). "İkinci Meşrutiyet Döneminde Meclisler: 1908-1918". Güneydoğu Avrupa Araştırmaları Dergisi (in Turkish) (4–5): 0. ISSN 0378-3863.
- Hasan, Kayalı (1995). "Elections and the Electoral Process in the Ottoman Empire, 1876-1919" (PDF). International Journal of Middle East Studies. 27 (3): 265–286. doi:10.1017/S0020743800062085. JSTOR 176251. S2CID 44470151 – via Cambridge University Press.
