= 4th Chamber of Deputies of the Ottoman Empire =

History
- Founded: 18 April 1912
- Disbanded: 5 August 1912
- Preceded by: 3rd Chamber of Deputies
- Succeeded by: 5th Chamber of Deputies

Leadership
- President of the Chamber of Deputies: Milâslı Halil (Menteşe)
- Deputy President of the Chamber of Deputies: Ruhi Khalidi
- Seats: 288 deputies

Elections
- Voting system: Electoral college
- Last election: 1912
- Next election: 1914

Meeting place
- Cemile Sultan Palace

The Fourth Chamber of Deputies of the Ottoman Empire was elected in the 1912 Ottoman general election. It was known as the Sopalı Seçimler (the election of clubs) because of much electoral fraud and violence between the two main parties, Union and Progress and Freedom and Accord. It was in session for just five months until the Savior Officers shuttered the Parliament in a coup via memorandum.

== Members ==
Vliayet	Electoral District/Sancak	Deputy	Party	Ethnicity
Kosovo	İpek (Peja)	Hafız İbrahim (Zaimoğlu)	Union and Progress Party	Turk
Kosovo	Taşlıça (Pljevlja)	Mehmet İzzet Pasha	Independent	Turk
Kosovo	Sjenica	Emir Bey	Independent	Albanian
Kosovo	Skopje	Todor Pavlov	Freedom and Accord Party	Bulgarian
Kosovo	Skopje	Spiro Hadzi Ristić	Union and Progress Party	Serb
Kosovo	Skopje	Feodor Paskalef	Independent	Slavic
Kosovo	Skopje	Ali Shefik Bey	Independent	Albanian
Kosovo	Skopje	Zef Bey	Independent	Albanian
Scutari	Draç (Durrës)	Essad Pasha Toptani	Independent	Albanian
Scutari	İşkodra (Shkodër)	Murtaza Galip	Independent	Albanian
Scutari	İşkodra (Shkodër)	Reza Bey	Independent	Albanian
Yanya	Yanya (Ioannina)	Dimitraki Kingos Efendi	Independent	Rum
Yanya	Yanya (Ioannina)	Konstantin Sorla Efendi	Independent	Rum
Yanya	Ergiri (Gjirokastër)	Mufid Libohova	Independent	Albanian
Yanya	Ergiri (Gjirokastër)	Despri Efendi	Independent	Albanian
Yanya	Berat	Sami Bey	Independent	Albanian
Yanya	Berat	Syrja Vlora	Independent	Albanian
Yanya	Çamlık (Preveza)	Shahin Dino	Independent	Albanian
Monastir	Manastır (Bitola)	Mehmed Vasif Bey	Freedom and Accord Party	Albanian
Monastir	Manastır (Bitola)	Ali Fethi (Okyar)	Union and Progress Party	Turk
Monastir	Manastır (Bitola)	Traianos Nallis	Independent	Rum
Monastir	Manastır (Bitola)	Pancho Dorev	Independent	Bulgarian
Monastir	Manastır (Bitola)	Janko Dimitrović	Independent	Serb
Monastir	Görice	Suleyman Bey	Independent	Albanian
Monastir	Görice	Filip Mișea	Independent	Aromanian
Monastir	Debre (Debar)	Shefqet (Enön) Bey	Freedom and Accord Party	Albanian
Monastir	Prezrin (Prizren)	Abdulaziz	Union and Progress Party	Albanian
Monastir	Prezrin (Prizren)	Haxhi Destan Efendi	Union and Progress Party	Albanian
Monastir	Prezrin (Prizren)	Tevfik Nazif (Arıcan)	Union and Progress Party	Albanian
Monastir	Elbasan	Shevket Bey	Independent	Albanian
Monastir	Serfiçe (Servia)	Osman Bey	Union and Progress Party	Turk
Monastir	Serfiçe (Servia)	Gregorios Anagnostu	Union and Progress Party	Rum
Selanik	Selanik (Thessaloniki)	Mehmed Cavid	Union and Progress Party	Turk
Selanik	Selanik (Thessaloniki)	Mustafa Rahmi Evranos (Arslan)	Union and Progress Party	Turk
Selanik	Selanik (Thessaloniki)	Halil Bey	Union and Progress Party	Turk
Selanik	Selanik (Thessaloniki)	Emanuel Karasu	Union and Progress Party	Jewish
Selanik	Selanik (Thessaloniki)	Dimitar Vlahof	Ottoman Socialist Party	Bulgarian
Selanik	Selanik (Thessaloniki)	Jordan Nikolov	Independent	Bulgarian
Selanik	Selanik (Thessaloniki)	Kiryako Koçuno Efendi	Independent	Rum
Selanik	Siroz (Serrez)	Aleksander Boynof	Independent	Bulgarian
Selanik	Siroz (Serrez)	Stoyo Hadzhiyev	Independent	Bulgarian
Selanik	Siroz (Serrez)	Hulusi Bey	Independent	Turk
Selanik	Siroz (Serrez)	Dimitrios Dinkas	Independent	Rum
Selanik	Drama	Midhat Şükrü (Bleda)	Union and Progress Party	Turk
Selanik	Drama	Rıza Bey	Union and Progress Party	Turk
Adrianople	Gümülcine (Komotini)	Hacı Mehmet Adil (Arda)	Union and Progress Party	Turk
Adrianople	Gümülcine (Komotini)	Mehmed Arif Bey	Union and Progress Party	Turk
Adrianople	Gümülcine (Komotini)	Mehmet Fehmi	Union and Progress Party	Turk
Adrianople	Dedeağaç (Alexandroupoli)	Süleyman Bey	Union and Progress Party	Turk
Adrianople	Gelibolu	Trayan Narlı Efendi	Independent	Armenian
Adrianople	Gelibolu	Hüseyin Ulvi	Independent	Turk
Adrianople	Tekfurdağı	Agop Boyacıyan	Union and Progress Party	Armenian
Adrianople	Tekfurdağı	Bedreddin Bey	Independent	Turk
Adrianople	Adrianople (Edirne)	Mehmed Faik (Kaltakkıran)	Union and Progress Party	Turk
Adrianople	Adrianople (Edirne)	Mehmed Talât	Union and Progress Party	Turk
Adrianople	Adrianople (Edirne)	Emin Bey	Union and Progress Party	Turk
Adrianople	Kırkkilise	Emrullah	Union and Progress Party	Turk
Adrianople	Kırkkilise	Ömer Naci	Union and Progress Party	Turk
Independent	Çatalca	Süleyman Efendi	Union and Progress Party	Turk
Constantinople	Constantinople (İstanbul)	Yağcı Şefik	Union and Progress Party	Turk
Constantinople	Constantinople (İstanbul)	Ahmed Nesimi (Sayman)	Union and Progress Party	Turk
Constantinople	Constantinople (İstanbul)	Memduh Bey	Union and Progress Party	Turk
Constantinople	Constantinople (İstanbul)	Hüseyin Haşim (Sanver)	Union and Progress Party	Turk
Constantinople	Constantinople (İstanbul)	Hüseyin Cahid (Yalçın)	Union and Progress Party	Turk
Constantinople	Constantinople (İstanbul)	Bedros Halaçyan	Union and Progress Party	Armenian
Constantinople	Constantinople (İstanbul)	Krikor Zohrab	Freedom and Accord Party	Armenian
Constantinople	Constantinople (İstanbul)	Orfanidis Efendi	Independent	Rum
Constantinople	Constantinople (İstanbul)	Yorgaki Artas	Independent	Rum
Constantinople	Constantinople (İstanbul)	Vitali Hayim Faraggi	Independent	Jewish
Independent	İzmit	İsmail Canbulat	Union and Progress Party	Turk
Independent	İzmit	Ahmed Müfid	Independent	Turk
Independent	İzmit	Anastas Mihailidis	Independent	Rum
Hüdavendigâr	Bursa	Hasan Refet (Canıtez)	Union and Progress Party	Turk
Hüdavendigâr	Bursa	Rıza Hamit	Union and Progress Party	Turk
Hüdavendigâr	Bursa	Hafız Ahmet Hamdi	Freedom and Accord Party	Turk
Hüdavendigâr	Bursa	Ahmed Fevzi Efendi	Independent	Turk
Hüdavendigâr	Bursa	Abdullah Sabri Efendi	Independent	Turk
Hüdavendigâr	Ertugrul (Bilecik)	Hakkı Baha (Pars) Bey	Union and Progress Party	Turk
Hüdavendigâr	Ertugrul (Bilecik)	Mehmed Sadık	Independent	Turk
Hüdavendigâr	Karahisarı Sahib (Afyon)	Hacı Ahmed Efendi	Independent	Turk
Hüdavendigâr	Karahisarı Sahib (Afyon)	Hoca Kamil	Independent	Turk
Hüdavendigâr	Karahisarı Sahib (Afyon)	Salim Efendi	Independent	Turk
Hüdavendigâr	Kütahya	Abdullah Azmi	Union and Progress Party	Turk
Hüdavendigâr	Kütahya	Yenibehçeli Nail	Union and Progress Party	Turk
Hüdavendigâr	Kütahya	Sadık Bey	Independent	Turk
Hüdavendigâr	Kütahya	Hatibzade Ahmed Cemal	Independent	Turk
Independent	Biga	Atıf (Kamçıl)	Union and Progress Party	Turk
Independent	Biga	Kazım Bey	Independent	Turk
Archipelago	Limni (Lemnos)	Mihailki Efendi	Independent	Rum
Archipelago	Midilli (Lesbos)	Dimitraki Sava Efendi	Independent	Rum
Archipelago	Sakız	Apadyako Efendi	Independent	Rum
Archipelago	Rhodes	Teodor Konstantidi	Independent	Rum
Aydin	Menteşe (Muğla)	Milâslı Halil (Menteşe)	Union and Progress Party	Turk
Aydin	Menteşe (Muğla)	Ali Haydar (Yuluğ)	Independent	Turk
Aydin	Denizli	Fraşirili Gani	Union and Progress Party	Turk
Aydin	Denizli	Sadık Efendi	Independent	Turk
Aydin	Aydın	Yunus Nadi (Abalıoğlu)	Union and Progress Party	Turk
Aydin	Aydın	Übeydullah (Hatipoğlu)	Union and Progress Party	Turk
Aydin	Aydın	Kâzım Nuri (Çörüş)	Independent	Turk
Aydin	Smyrna (İzmir)	Mehmed Seyyid	Union and Progress Party	Turk
Aydin	Smyrna (İzmir)	Musa Kâzım Bey	Union and Progress Party	Turk
Aydin	Smyrna (İzmir)	Emmanouil Emmanouilidis	Union and Progress Party	Rum
Aydin	Smyrna (İzmir)	Nesim Mazliyah	Union and Progress Party	Jewish
Aydin	Smyrna (İzmir)	Vahan Bardizbanyan	Armenian Revolutionary Federation	Armenian
Aydin	Smyrna (İzmir)	Pavlos Karolidis	Independent	Rum
Aydin	Saruhan (Manisa)	Haydar Bey	Union and Progress Party	Turk
Aydin	Saruhan (Manisa)	Mustafa Fevzi	Union and Progress Party	Turk
Aydin	Saruhan (Manisa)	Mehmed Sabri (Toprak)	Union and Progress Party	Turk
Aydin	Saruhan (Manisa)	Hüseyin Kazım (Kadri)	Union and Progress Party	Turk
Aydin	Saruhan (Manisa)	Mansurizade Mehmed Said	Union and Progress Party	Turk
Independent	Karesi (Balıkesir)	Hasan Ferhad Bey	Union and Progress Party	Turk
Independent	Karesi (Balıkesir)	Mehmed Vehbi (Bolak) Bey	Union and Progress Party	Turk
Independent	Karesi (Balıkesir)	Hacı Ali Galip	Independent	Turk
Independent	Karesi (Balıkesir)	Konstantin Savopulos	Independent	Rum
Konya	Konya	Muhammed Zeynelabidin	Union and Progress Party	Turk
Konya	Konya	Mehmed Emin Efendi	Independent	Turk
Konya	Konya	Ali Kemal Bey	Independent	Turk
Konya	Konya	Mehmet Rıza Bey	Independent	Turk
Konya	Konya	Ömer Vehbi (Büyükyalvaç)	Independent	Turk
Konya	Hamid-i Abad (İsparta)	Ağlarcazade Mustafa Hakkı	Union and Progress Party	Turk
Konya	Hamid-i Abad (İsparta)	Eşref Bey	Independent	Turk
Konya	Burdur	Galip Pasha	Independent	Turk
Konya	Antalya	İdris Bey	Independent	Turk
Konya	Antalya	Münir Bey	Independent	Turk
Kastamonu	Kastamonu	Necmeddin Molla (Kocataş)	Union and Progress Party	Turk
Kastamonu	Kastamonu	Ahmet Mahir	Union and Progress Party	Turk
Kastamonu	Kastamonu	İsmail Mahir Efendi	Union and Progress Party	Turk
Kastamonu	Kastamonu	Hüsnü Bey	Independent	Turk
Kastamonu	Çankırı	Mehmed Sabri	Union and Progress Party	Turk
Kastamonu	Çankırı	Hacı Mustafa Tevfik (Durlanık)	Independent	Turk
Kastamonu	Sinop	İsmail Hakkı Bey	Union and Progress Party	Turk
Kastamonu	Sinop	Hacı Hasan Fehmi (Tümerkan)	Union and Progress Party	Turk
Independent	Bolu	Yusuf Ziya (Özenci)	Union and Progress Party	Turk
Independent	Bolu	Rıfat Kamil (Madenci) Bey	Union and Progress Party	Turk
Independent	Bolu	Mehmet Habip	Freedom and Accord Party	Turk
Independent	Bolu	Mustafa Zeki Efendi	Independent	Turk
Ankara	Ankara	Hacı Mustafa	Union and Progress Party	Turk
Ankara	Ankara	Mehmet Talât (Sönmez)	Union and Progress Party	Turk
Ankara	Ankara	Halil Hâlid	Union and Progress Party	Turk
Ankara	Ankara	Nüsret Sadullah (Ayaşlı)	Union and Progress Party	Turk
Ankara	Niğde	Ürgüplü Mustafa Hayri	Union and Progress Party	Turk
Ankara	Niğde	Muhiddin Bey	Independent	Turk
Ankara	Niğde	Anayas Efendi	Independent	Rum
Ankara	Niğde	Georgios Kourtoglou	Independent	Rum
Ankara	Kayseri	Ahmed Rıfat (Çalık)	Union and Progress Party	Turk
Ankara	Kayseri	Ali Galib	Independent	Turk
Ankara	Kırşehir	Ali Rıza (Benli)	Independent	Turk
Ankara	Kırşehir	Mahmud Mahir	Independent	Turk
Ankara	Yozgat	Münir Bey	Union and Progress Party	Turk
Ankara	Yozgat	Kınacızade Şakir Bey	Union and Progress Party	Turk
Ankara	Çorum	Mehmet Münir (Çağıl)	Union and Progress Party	Turk
Ankara	Çorum	Ali Osman Efendi	Union and Progress Party	Turk
Ankara	Çorum	Hamdi Bey	Union and Progress Party	Turk
Adana	Adana	Abdullah Faik (Çopuroğlu)	Independent	Turk
Adana	Cebelibereket (Dörtyol)	Hasan Sezai Bey	Union and Progress Party	Turk
Adana	Kozan	Ali İlmi Efendi	Independent	Turk
Adana	İçel	Hafız Emin (İnankur)	Union and Progress Party	Turk
Adana	Mersin	Sadık Pasha	Independent	Turk
Independent	Canik (Samsun)	Avnizade Talât (Özüdoğru)	Union and Progress Party	Turk
Independent	Canik (Samsun)	Süleyman Nacmi (Selman)	Union and Progress Party	Turk
Independent	Canik (Samsun)	Hakkı Bey	Independent	Turk
Independent	Canik (Samsun)	Hacı Ahmed Hamdi Efendi	Independent	Turk
Sivas	Sivas	Dr. Garabed Pashayan Khan	Armenian Revolutionary Federation	Armenian
Sivas	Sivas	Emin Edip	Independent	Turk
Sivas	Sivas	Dr. Hüsnü Bey	Independent	Turk
Sivas	Sivas	Dr. Ömer Şevki (Purut)	Independent	Turk
Sivas	Sivas	Mustafa Ziya Bey	Independent	Turk
Sivas	Tokat	Tahsin Rıza Bey	Union and Progress Party	Turk
Sivas	Tokat	Hacı Kâmil (Baştopçu)	Independent	Turk
Sivas	Tokat	Şakir Bey	Independent	Turk
Sivas	Amasya	Arif Fazıl	Union and Progress Party	Turk
Sivas	Amasya	Hacı Mustafa Efendi	Independent	Turk
Sivas	Amasya	Hasan Rasim Efendi	Independent	Turk
Sivas	Amasya	İsmail Hakkı Pasha	Independent	Turk
Sivas	Amasya	İbrahim Cudi	Independent	Turk
Sivas	Karahisar-ı Şarkı	Ömer Feyzi Efendi	Freedom and Accord Party	Turk
Sivas	Karahisar-ı Şarkı	Hafızzade Mehmet Vasfi (Seçer)	Union and Progress Party	Turk
Sivas	Karahisar-ı Şarkı	Mustafa (Serdaroğlu)	Independent	Turk
Independent	Urfa (Şanlıurfa)	Sheikh Saffet Kemaleddin (Yetkin)	Union and Progress Party	Turk
Independent	Urfa (Şanlıurfa)	Ömer Edip Bey	Independent	Turk
Diyarbekir	Diyarbakır	Mehmed Zülfü (Tigrel)	Union and Progress Party	Turk
Diyarbekir	Diyarbakır	Pirinççizade Aziz Feyzi	Independent	Kurd
Diyarbekir	Siverek	Müftüzade İsmail Hakkı Bey	Union and Progress Party	Turk
Diyarbekir	Ergani	Ziya Gökalp	Union and Progress Party	Turk
Diyarbekir	Ergani	İstepan Çıracıyan	Independent	Armenian
Diyarbekir	Mardin	Said Bey	Independent	Turk
Diyarbekir	Mardin	Hasan Lâmi Bey	Independent	Turk
Memuretulaziz	Malatya	Osman Avni Bey	Independent	Turk
Memuretulaziz	Malatya	Mehmed Tevfik Efendi	Independent	Turk
Memuretulaziz	Memuretalaziz (Elazığ)	Hacı Osman	Independent	Turk
Memuretulaziz	Memuretalaziz (Elazığ)	Hacı Mehmed Nuri	Independent	Turk
Memuretulaziz	Memuretalaziz (Elazığ)	İsperzade Mustafa Saffet (Solmaz)	Independent	Turk
Memuretulaziz	Dersim (Tunceli)	Salim Efendi	Independent	Turk
Trabzon	Trabzon	Ali Osman (Güley)	Union and Progress Party	Turk
Trabzon	Trabzon	Hafız Mehmet	Union and Progress Party	Turk
Trabzon	Trabzon	Servet Bey	Union and Progress Party	Turk
Trabzon	Trabzon	Nemlizâde Hacı Osman	Independent	Turk
Trabzon	Trabzon	İzzet Eyüboğlu	Independent	Turk
Trabzon	Trabzon	Mahmud Memduh	Independent	Turk
Trabzon	Trabzon	Matthaios Kofidis	Independent	Rum
Trabzon	Gümüşhane	Hasan Fehmi (Ataç)	Union and Progress Party	Turk
Trabzon	Gümüşhane	Hayri Efendi	Independent	Turk
Trabzon	Lazistan (Rize)	Ziya Molla Bey	Union and Progress Party	Turk
Trabzon	Lazistan (Rize)	Ahmed Pasha	Independent	Turk
Erzurum	Erzurum	Karakin Pastermadjian	Armenian Revolutionary Federation	Armenian
Erzurum	Erzurum	Vartkes Serengülian	Armenian Revolutionary Federation	Armenian
Erzurum	Erzurum	Raif Dinç	Union and Progress Party	Turk
Erzurum	Erzurum	Şaban Efendi	Independent	Turk
Erzurum	Erzurum	Hüseyin Tosun	Independent	Turk
Erzurum	Erzurum	Hacı Lütfullah Efendi	Independent	Turk
Erzurum	Bayazıt	Süleyman Sudi (Acarbay)	Union and Progress Party	Turk
Erzurum	Erzincan	Halet (Sağıroğlu)	Union and Progress Party	Turk
Bitlis	Bingöl (Genç)	Mehmed Emin	Independent	Turk
Bitlis	Muş	Gegham Ter-Karapetian	Armenian Revolutionary Federation	Armenian
Bitlis	Muş	Hacı İlyas Sami (Muş)	Union and Progress Party	Turk
Bitlis	Bitlis	Nusret Sadullah Fevzi (Eren)	Independent	Turk
Bitlis	Siirt	Nazım Bey	Independent	Turk
Van	Van	Arshak Vramian	Armenian Revolutionary Federation	Armenian
Van	Van	Ahmet Midhat (Altıok)	Independent	Turk
Independent	Zor	Mehmet Nuri Efendi	Independent	Turk
Aleppo	Aleppo	Artin Boshgezenyan	Union and Progress Party	Armenian
Aleppo	Aleppo	Mehmet Ali Cenani	Union and Progress Party	Turk
Aleppo	Aleppo	Sheikh Mustafa	Union and Progress Party	Arab
Aleppo	Aleppo	Muhammed Bahaeddin al-Amiri	Independent	Arab
Aleppo	Aleppo	Bahri Bey	Independent	Arab
Aleppo	Aleppo	Hamid Abdulghafur Bey	Independent	Arab
Aleppo	Aleppo	Sadiq al-Rifai Bey	Independent	Arab
Aleppo	Maraş (Kahramanmaraş)	Hacı Hasan Fehmi	Independent	Turk
Aleppo	Maraş (Kahramanmaraş)	İbrahim Evliya	Independent	Turk
Beirut	Trablusşam (Tripoli, Lebanon)	Muhammed Jisri	Independent	Arab
Beirut	Trablusşam (Tripoli, Lebanon)	Saadullah Molla Bey	Independent	Arab
Beirut	Beirut	Kâmil Al Esad	Union and Progress Party	Arab
Beirut	Beirut	Muharrem Misbah	Independent	Arab
Beirut	Acre	Esad Tawfiq Efendi	Freedom and Accord Party	Arab
Beirut	Nablus	Haydar Tufan	Independent	Arab
Beirut	Lazikiye (Latakia)	Abdul Walid Harun Efendi	Independent	Arab
Damascus	Hama	Halid al-Berazi Bey	Freedom and Accord Party	Arab
Damascus	Hama	Seyyid Haşim Bey	Union and Progress Party	Turk
Damascus	Havran	Reshid Tali Bey	Union and Progress Party	Arab
Damascus	Havran	Ismail Harari Bey	Independent	Arab
Damascus	Damascus	Muhammed Feyzi Pasha	Union and Progress Party	Arab
Damascus	Damascus	Abdurrahman Pasha al-Yusuf	Independent	Arab
Damascus	Damascus	Amin Bey	Independent	Arab
Damascus	Damascus	Abdul Muhsin Ustuwani	Independent	Arab
Damascus	Al-Karak	Muhammed al-Ayyubi	Independent	Arab
Independent	Jerusalem Mutasarrifate	Ruhi al-Khalidi	Union and Progress Party	Arab
Independent	Jerusalem Mutasarrifate	Uthman Nashashibi Bey	Independent	Arab
Independent	Jerusalem Mutasarrifate	Ahmed Arif al-Husayni Efendi	Independent	Arab
Hejaz	Jeddah	Sharif Faisal bin Al-Hussein	Independent	Arab
Hejaz	Mecca	Sharif Abdullah bin Al-Hussein	Independent	Arab
Hejaz	Mecca	Hasan Sheybi Efendi	Independent	Arab
Yemen	Asir	Seyyid Yusuf Fazil Bey	Independent	Arab
Yemen	Asir	Hüsameddin Bey	Independent	Turk
Yemen	Sanaa	Seyid Ahmed Bey	Independent	Arab
Yemen	Sanaa	Seyyid Ahmed Yahya al-Keysi Efendi	Independent	Arab
Yemen	Sanaa	Seyyid Hussein Efendi	Independent	Arab
Yemen	Sanaa	Seyyid Ali Ibrahim Efendi	Independent	Arab
Yemen	Sanaa	Nuri Bey	Independent	Turk
Yemen	Al Hudaydah	Mustafa Fehmi Bey	Independent	Turk
Yemen	Al Hudaydah	Hıfzi Bey	Independent	Turk
Yemen	Al Hudaydah	Hakkı İlhami Bey	Independent	Turk
Yemen	Al Hudaydah	Zühdü Efendi	Independent	Turk
Yemen	Al Hudaydah	Seyid Yahya Pasha	Independent	Arab
Basra	Basra	Babanzade Ahmed Naim	Union and Progress Party	Kurd
Basra	Basra	Seyyid Talib ibn Rajab	Independent	Arab
Basra	Basra	Zuheyrzade Abdullah	Independent	Arab
Basra	Basra	Karataşzade Abdülvehap Pasha	Independent	Turk (?)
Basra	Müntefik	Ferid Pashazade Abdul Muhsin Bey	Union and Progress Party	Arab
Basra	Müntefik	Muhammed Hamza Bey	Independent	Arab
Basra	Müntefik	Jamil Sidqi al-Zahawi	Independent	Kurd
Baghdad	Divaniye	Ismail Hakki Bey	Independent	Arab
Baghdad	Kerbala	Fuad Bey	Independent	Turk (?)
Baghdad	Kerbala	Nuri Bey	Independent	Turk (?)
Baghdad	Baghdad	Sassoon Eskell	Union and Progress Party	Jewish
Baghdad	Baghdad	Fuad al-Defteri Bey	Independent	Arab
Baghdad	Baghdad	Seyyid Muhiddin	Independent	Arab
Baghdad	Baghdad	Suleymanzade Murad Bey	Independent	Arab
Baghdad	Baghdad	Babanzâde İsmail Hakkı	Independent	Kurd
Mosul	Kirkuk	Mehmed Ali	Independent	Turk (?)
Mosul	Kirkuk	Bahaeddin Bey	Independent	Turk (?)
Mosul	Kirkuk	Abdullah Safi Efendi	Independent	Arab
Mosul	Sulaymaniyah	Babanzade Hikmet Bey	Union and Progress Party	Kurd
Mosul	Mosul	Salih Saadi Bey	Independent	Arab
Mosul	Mosul	Hasan Faiq Bey	Independent	Arab
Mosul	Mosul	Ibrahim Fawzi Efendi	Independent	Arab
Tripolitania	Trablusgarp (Tripoli, Libya)	Ferhad Efendi	Freedom and Accord Party	Arab
Tripolitania	Trablusgarp (Tripoli, Libya)	Muhtar Kabar	Independent	Arab
Tripolitania	Trablusgarp (Tripoli, Libya)	Mahmud Naci (Balkış)	Independent	Turk
Tripolitania	Cebeligarbi	Sulayman al-Baruni	Independent	Arab
Tripolitania	Cebeligarbi	Feyzullah Zubeyr Efendi	Independent	Arab
Tripolitania	Fezzan	Abdülkadir Cami (Baykut)	Union and Progress Party	Turk
Tripolitania	Humus	Mehmed Şefik Bey	Union and Progress Party	Turk
Independent	Bengazi	Yusuf Şetvan	Union and Progress Party	Arab
Independent	Bengazi	Omar Pasha Mansour El-Kikhia	Independent	Turk
Independent	Bengazi	Abdul Qadir Pasha	Independent	Arab (?)
