= 5th Chamber of Deputies of the Ottoman Empire =

Chamber of deputies in the Ottoman Empire

History
- Founded: 1914
- Disbanded: 1919
- Preceded by: 4th Chamber of Deputies
- Succeeded by: 6th Chamber of Deputies

Leadership
- President of the Chamber of Deputies: Milâslı Halil (Menteşe) (1914–1915); Mehmet Adil (1915–1919)
- Seats: 275 deputies

Elections
- Voting system: Electoral college
- Last election: 1914
- Next election: 1919

Meeting place
- Cemile Sultan Palace

The Fifth Chamber of Deputies of the Ottoman Empire was elected in the 1914 Ottoman general election, and served from 1914 to 1919.

== Members ==
Vilayet	Electoral District/Sancak	Deputy	Party	Ethnicity
Adrianople	Gelibolu	Dimitriaki Fito Efendi	Independent	Rum
Adrianople	Tekfurdağı	Timestokli Efkalidis Efendi	Independent	Rum
Adrianople	Tekfurdağı	Harun Hilmi Efendi	Independent	Turk
Adrianople	Adrianople (Edirne)	Mehmet Faik (Kaltakkıran)	Union and Progress Party	Turk
Adrianople	Adrianople (Edirne)	Mehmed Talat Pasha (Note: Grand Vizier)	Union and Progress Party	Turk
Adrianople	Adrianople (Edirne)	Hacı İbrahim Bey	Union and Progress Party	Turk
Adrianople	Kırkkilise (Kırklareli)	Hoca Fehmi Efendi	Independent	Turk
Adrianople	Kırkkilise (Kırklareli)	Rıza Bey	Independent	Turk
Independent	Çatalca	Tokidis Efendi	Independent	Rum
Constantinople	Constantinople (İstanbul)	Ahmed Nesimi (Sayman)	Union and Progress Party	Turk
Constantinople	Constantinople (İstanbul)	İsmet (Note: Resigned due to his appointment to the Istanbul governorship in 1914, reelected following Zohrab's murder)	Union and Progress Party	Turk
Constantinople	Constantinople (İstanbul)	Sahib Mollazade Osman Bey	Union and Progress Party	Turk
Constantinople	Constantinople (İstanbul)	Ali Fethi (Okyar) (Note: Elected deputy from Constantinople in Konstantin Savaopulos's place)	Union and Progress Party	Turk
Constantinople	Constantinople (İstanbul)	Hüseyin Cahid (Yalçın)	Union and Progress Party	Turk
Constantinople	Constantinople (İstanbul)	Yağcı Şefik	Union and Progress Party	Turk
Constantinople	Constantinople (İstanbul)	Hüseyin Selahattin (Cimcoz)	Union and Progress Party	Turk
Constantinople	Constantinople (İstanbul)	Emanuel Karasu	Union and Progress Party	Jewish
Constantinople	Constantinople (İstanbul)	Bedros Hallaçyan	Union and Progress Party	Armenian
Constantinople	Constantinople (İstanbul)	Krikor Zohrab (Note: Killed by Çerkez Ahmed on the way to Urfa from Diyarbekir in July 1915)	Freedom and Accord Party	Armenian
Constantinople	Constantinople (İstanbul)	Orfanidis Efendi	Independent	Rum
Constantinople	Constantinople (İstanbul)	Haralambidis Efendi	Independent	Rum
Constantinople	Constantinople (İstanbul)	Konstantin Savaopoulos (Note: Died)	Independent	Rum
Constantinople	Constantinople (İstanbul)	Viktor Bey Çorbacıoğlu	Independent	Jewish
Constantinople	Constantinople (İstanbul)	Hayrullah Mübeydi Efendi	Independent	Turk
Independent	İzmit	Hafız Rüştü Bey	Freedom and Accord Party	Turk
Independent	İzmit	Ziya Bey	Independent	Turk
Independent	İzmit	Anastas Mihailidis	Independent	Rum
Hüdavendigâr	Bursa	Hasan Refet (Canıtez)	Union and Progress Party	Turk
Hüdavendigâr	Bursa	Rıza Hamit	Union and Progress Party	Turk
Hüdavendigâr	Bursa	Hacı Mehmet Adil (Arda)	Union and Progress Party	Turk
Hüdavendigâr	Bursa	Hafız Ahmet Hamdi Efendi	Freedom and Accord Party	Turk
Hüdavendigâr	Bursa	Ahmed Fevzi Efendi	Independent	Turk
Hüdavendigâr	Ertugrul (Bilecik)	Mehmet Şemseddin (Günaltay)	Union and Progress Party	Turk
Hüdavendigâr	Ertugrul (Bilecik)	Mehmed Sadık	Independent	Turk
Hüdavendigâr	Ertugrul (Bilecik)	Enver Bey	Independent	Turk
Hüdavendigâr	Kütahya	Abdullah Azmi (Torun)	Union and Progress Party	Turk
Hüdavendigâr	Kütahya	Sadık Bey	Independent	Turk
Hüdavendigâr	Kütahya	İbrahim Kazım (Tahtakılıç)	Independent	Turk
Hüdavendigâr	Kütahya	Hacı Hafız Abdullah Efendi	Independent	Turk
Hüdavendigâr	Karahisarı Sahib (Afyon)	Ahmet Ağaoğlu	Union and Progress Party	Turk
Hüdavendigâr	Karahisarı Sahib (Afyon)	Rıza Pasha	Union and Progress Party	Turk
Hüdavendigâr	Karahisarı Sahib (Afyon)	Hoca Kamil Miras	Independent	Turk
Hüdavendigâr	Karahisarı Sahib (Afyon)	Salim Efendi	Independent	Turk
Independent	Biga	Kazım Bey	Independent	Turk
Independent	Kale-i Sultaniye (Çanakkale)	Mehmed Cavid	Union and Progress Party	Turk
Aydin	Menteşe (Muğla)	Milâslı Halil (Menteşe)	Union and Progress Party	Turk
Aydin	Menteşe (Muğla)	Mansurîzade Said	Union and Progress Party	Turk
Aydin	Denizli	Sadık Efendi	Independent	Turk
Aydin	Denizli	Tevfik Rüştü Bey	Unknown	Turk
Aydin	Aydın	Yunus Nadi (Abalıoğlu)	Union and Progress Party	Turk
Aydin	Aydın	Emmanouil Emmanouilidis	Union and Progress Party	Rum
Aydin	Aydın	Veli (Saltıkgil)	Independent	Turk
Aydin	Smyrna (İzmir)	Mehmed Seyyid (Note: Appointed to the senate)	Union and Progress Party	Turk
Aydin	Smyrna (İzmir)	Mustafa Rahmi (Köken) (Note: Elected deputy from Smyrna in Mehmed Seyyid's place)	Union and Progress Party	Turk
Aydin	Smyrna (İzmir)	Mehmet Übeydullah (Hatipoğlu)	Union and Progress Party	Turk
Aydin	Smyrna (İzmir)	Onnik İhsan	Union and Progress Party	Armenian
Aydin	Smyrna (İzmir)	Nesim Mazliyah	Union and Progress Party	Jewish
Aydin	Smyrna (İzmir)	Siminoğlu Simonaki Efendi	Independent	Rum
Aydin	Smyrna (İzmir)	Vangil Mimaroğlu Efendi	Independent	Rum
Aydin	Saruhan (Manisa)	Haydar	Union and Progress Party	Turk
Aydin	Saruhan (Manisa)	Mustafa Fevzi (Sarhan)	Union and Progress Party	Turk
Aydin	Saruhan (Manisa)	Mehmed Sabri (Toprak)	Union and Progress Party	Turk
Aydin	Saruhan (Manisa)	Mustafa İbrahim Efendi	Independent	Turk
Independent	Karesi (Balıkesir)	Hasan Ferhad Bey	Union and Progress Party	Turk
Independent	Karesi (Balıkesir)	Mehmed Vehbi (Bolak)	Union and Progress Party	Turk
Independent	Karesi (Balıkesir)	Hüseyin Kazım (Kadri)	Union and Progress Party	Turk
Independent	Karesi (Balıkesir)	Hüseyin Haşim (Sanver)	Union and Progress Party	Turk
Independent	Karesi (Balıkesir)	Hacı Ali Galib	Independent	Turk
Independent	Karesi (Balıkesir)	Konstantin Savopulos	Independent	Rum
Konya	Konya	Mustafa Şeref (Özkan) (Note: Resigned in 1915 due to his appointment as Undersecretary of the Ministry of Trade and Agriculture)	Union and Progress Party	Turk
Konya	Konya	Hamdi Bey (Note: Elected deputy of Konya in Mustafa Şeref's place)	Union and Progress Party	Turk
Konya	Konya	Ali Haydar (Aksoy)	Independent	Turk
Konya	Konya	Ali Rıza Efendi	Independent	Turk
Konya	Konya	Şâkir Bey	Independent	Turk
Konya	Konya	Müftüzâde Tevfik Bey	Independent	Turk
Konya	Isparta	Mahmud Esad (Note: Elected deputy from Isparta in Mehmed Şevki's place) (Note: Died)	Union and Progress Party	Turk
Konya	Isparta	Mustafa Hakkı	Independent	Turk
Konya	Isparta	İbrahim Cudi (Note: Elected deputy from Isparta in Mahmud Esad's place)	Independent	Turk
Konya	Isparta	Mehmed Şevki Bey (Note: Died)	Independent	Turk
Konya	Burdur	Mustafa Atıf (Bayındır) (Note: Resigned on December 1, 1914, due to his appointment as the Director of Local Administrations)	Union and Progress Party	Turk
Konya	Burdur	Seyyid Haşim (Note: Elected deputy from Burdur in Mustafa Atıf's place)	Union and Progress Party	Turk
Konya	Burdur	Midhat Şükrü (Bleda)	Union and Progress Party	Turk
Konya	Antalya	Fuad Hulusi (Demirelli)	Union and Progress Party	Turk
Konya	Antalya	Hamdullah Emin Pasha	Independent	Turk
Kastamonu	Kastamonu	Necmeddin Molla (Kocataş)	Union and Progress Party	Turk
Kastamonu	Kastamonu	Ahmet Mahir	Union and Progress Party	Turk
Kastamonu	Kastamonu	İsmail Mahir	Union and Progress Party	Turk
Kastamonu	Kastamonu	Ahmed Şükrü (Bayındır)	Union and Progress Party	Turk
Kastamonu	Kastamonu	Sahibmollazade İsmail Bey	Independent	Turk
Kastamonu	Kastamonu	İzzet Molla Efendi (Note: Died)	Independent	Turk
Kastamonu	Kastamonu	Ahmet Rüştü (Çolakoğlu) (Note: Elected deputy of Kastamonu in İzzet Molla's place)	Independent	Turk
Kastamonu	Çankırı	Mehmed Sabri	Union and Progress Party	Turk
Kastamonu	Çankırı	Mehmed Behçet (Kutlu)	Union and Progress Party	Turk
Kastamonu	Çankırı	Mustafa Nedim Bey	Independent	Turk
Kastamonu	Çankırı	Mehmet Fazıl Berki (Tümtürk)	Independent	Turk
Kastamonu	Sinop	Hacı Hasan Fehmi (Tümerkan)	Union and Progress Party	Turk
Kastamonu	Sinop	Ömer Lütfi (Yasan)	Independent	Turk
Independent	Bolu	Yusuf Ziya (Özenci)	Union and Progress Party	Turk
Independent	Bolu	Rıfat Kamil (Madenci) Bey	Union and Progress Party	Turk
Independent	Bolu	Necati Bey	Independent	Turk
Independent	Bolu	Mustafa Zeki Efendi	Independent	Turk
Ankara	Ankara	Atıf (Kamçıl)	Union and Progress Party	Turk
Ankara	Ankara	Mustafa Hilmi (Çayırlıoğlu)	Independent	Turk
Ankara	Ankara	Hacı Taib Efendi	Independent	Turk
Ankara	Ankara	Ömer Mümtaz (Tambi)	Independent	Turk
Ankara	Niğde	Ürgüplü Mustafa Hayri	Union and Progress Party	Turk
Ankara	Niğde	Halid Bey (Note: Appointed to the Senate)	Union and Progress Party	Turk
Ankara	Niğde	Ebülula Mardin (Note: Elected deputy from Niğde in Halid Bey's place)	Union and Progress Party	Turk
Ankara	Niğde	Muhiddin Bey	Independent	Turk
Ankara	Niğde	Anayas Efendi	Independent	Rum
Ankara	Kayseri	İmamzade Ömer Mümtaz	Freedom and Accord Party	Turk
Ankara	Kayseri	Mustafa Şeref (Özkan) (Note: After becoming Undersecretary of the Ministry of Trade and Agriculture in 1915, was elected deputy from Niğde in Karapet Tomayan's place in 1917)	Union and Progress Party	Turk
Ankara	Kayseri	Karapet Tomayan (Note: Parliamentary membership terminated due to the fact he escaped to England)	Independent	Armenian
Ankara	Kırşehir	Ali Rıza (Benli)	Independent	Turk
Ankara	Kırşehir	Mahmud Mahir	Independent	Turk
Ankara	Yozgat	Kınacızade Şakir Bey	Union and Progress Party	Turk
Ankara	Yozgat	Kasım Nuri	Independent	Turk
Ankara	Çorum	Mehmet Münir (Çağıl) (Note: Resigned to become Undersecretary of the Evkaf Ministry)	Union and Progress Party	Turk
Ankara	Çorum	Azmi Bey	Union and Progress Party	Turk
Ankara	Çorum	Ahmed Muhiddin (Birgen)	Union and Progress Party	Turk
Ankara	Çorum	İsmet (Eker)	Independent	Turk
Adana	Adana	Subhi Pasha	Independent	Turk
Adana	Cebelibereket (Dörtyol)	Hasan Sezai Bey	Independent	Turk
Adana	Kozan	Matyos Nalbandiyan	Independent	Armenian
Adana	İçel	Hafız Emin (İnankur)	Union and Progress Party	Turk
Adana	Mersin	Sadık Pasha	Independent	Turk
Independent	Canık (Samsun)	Amizade Talat Avni (Özüdoğru)	Union and Progress Party	Turk
Independent	Canık (Samsun)	Nihad Bey	Union and Progress Party	Turk
Independent	Canık (Samsun)	Osmanbey (Selman)	Independent	Turk
Independent	Canık (Samsun)	Arzuoğlu Todoraki	Independent	Rum
Sivas	Amasya	İsmail Hakkı Pasha (Mumcu) (Note: Was appointed governor of Tokat)	Freedom and Accord Party	Turk
Sivas	Amasya	Arif Fazıl	Union and Progress Party	Turk
Sivas	Amasya	Dr. Asım (Sirel) (Note: Elected deputy from Amasya in İsmail Hakkı Pasha's place)	Independent	Turk
Sivas	Amasya	Nazıf (Aktın)	Independent	Turk
Sivas	Tokat	Hacı Kâmil (Baştopçu)	Independent	Turk
Sivas	Tokat	Mustafa Fehmi Bey	Independent	Turk
Sivas	Tokat	Tahsin Rıza Bey	Independent	Turk
Sivas	Sivas	Rasim (Başara)	Union and Progress Party	Turk
Sivas	Sivas	Emin Edip	Independent	Turk
Sivas	Sivas	Dr. Ömer Şevki (Purut)	Independent	Turk
Sivas	Sivas	Büyükhocazade Rahmi (Katoğlu)	Independent	Turk
Sivas	Sivas	Dikran Barsamyan	Independent	Armenian
Sivas	Karahisar-ı Şarkı	Muammer Raşit (Seviğ) (Note: Resigned in 1915 due to his appointment as the Undersecretary of Trade and Agriculture Ministry)	Independent	Turk
Sivas	Karahisar-ı Şarkı	Zihni Efendi	Independent	Turk
Sivas	Karahisar-ı Şarkı	Kuvanoğlu Yanko Efendi	Independent	Rum
Independent	Urfa (Şanlıurfa)	Sheikh Kemaleddin Saffet (Yetkin)	Union and Progress Party	Turk
Independent	Urfa (Şanlıurfa)	Ömer Edip Bey	Independent	Turk
Diyarbekir	Mardin	İhsan (Sağlam)	Independent	Turk
Diyarbekir	Mardin	Mustafa Efendi	Independent	Turk
Diyarbekir	Mardin	Sırrızâde Ali Rıza	Independent	Kurd
Diyarbekir	Diyarbakır	Mehmed Zülfi (Tigrel)	Union and Progress Party	Turk
Diyarbekir	Diyarbakır	Pirinççizade Aziz Feyzi	Independent	Kurd
Diyarbekir	Siverek	İbrahim Vehbi Bey	Union and Progress Party	Turk
Diyarbekir	Ergani	Mektubîzade Reşit Ronabar Pasha (Note: Elected deputy from Ergani in İstefan Çıracıyan's place)	Union and Progress Party	Turk
Diyarbekir	Ergani	Kâmil Efendi	Independent	Turk
Diyarbekir	Ergani	İstefan Çıracıyan (Note: Killed in Rezvani Pass in 1915)	Independent	Armenian
Memuretalaziz	Malatya	Keşşaf Efendi	Independent	Turk
Memuretalaziz	Malatya	Hâşim Bey	Independent	Turk
Memuretalaziz	Memuretalaziz (Elazığ)	Hacı Mehmed Said Efendi	Independent	Turk
Memuretalaziz	Memuretalaziz (Elazığ)	Hacı Mehmed Nuri	Independent	Turk
Memuretalaziz	Memuretalaziz (Elazığ)	Esperzade Mustafa Saffet (Solmaz)	Independent	Turk
Memuretalaziz	Dersim (Tunceli)	Mehmed Nuri Bey	Independent	Turk
Trabzon	Gümüşhane	Hasan Fehmi (Ataç)	Union and Progress Party	Turk
Trabzon	Gümüşhane	Veysel Rıza (Zarbun)	Independent	Turk
Trabzon	Trabzon	Ali Osman (Güley)	Union and Progress Party	Turk
Trabzon	Trabzon	Hafız Mehmet	Union and Progress Party	Turk
Trabzon	Trabzon	Servet Bey	Union and Progress Party	Turk
Trabzon	Trabzon	Yorgi Yuvanidis	Union and Progress Party	Rum
Trabzon	Trabzon	Matthaios Kofidis	Independent	Rum
Trabzon	Trabzon	Naci Bey	Independent	Turk
Trabzon	Trabzon	Mahmud Bey	Independent	Turk
Trabzon	Lazistan (Rize)	Ziya Molla Bey	Union and Progress Party	Turk
Trabzon	Lazistan (Rize)	Süleyman Sudi Bey	Union and Progress Party	Turk
Erzurum	Erzurum	Vartkes Serengülian (Note: Killed by Çerkez Ahmed on the road from Urfa to Diyarbekir in July 1915)	Armenian Revolutionary Federation	Armenian
Erzurum	Erzurum	Hafizzade Seyfullah (Topdağı)	Freedom and Accord Party	Turk
Erzurum	Erzurum	Raif (Dinç)	Union and Progress Party	Turk
Erzurum	Erzurum	Hüseyin Tosun	Independent	Turk
Erzurum	Erzurum	Osip Mededyan	Independent	Armenian
Erzurum	Erzurum	Hafız Ahmet Ziya	Independent	Kurd
Erzurum	Erzincan	Halet (Sağıroğlu)	Union and Progress Party	Turk
Erzurum	Bayazıt	Mehmet Şefik (Baydar)	Independent	Turk
Bitlis	Muş	Gegham Ter-Karapetian	Armenian Revolutionary Federation	Armenian
Bitlis	Muş	Hacı İlyas Sami Muş	Union and Progress Party	Turk
Bitlis	Bitlis	Mınas Çıraz	Independent	Armenian
Bitlis	Bitlis	Hasan Lami Efendi	Independent	Turk
Bitlis	Bingöl	Mehmed Emin	Independent	Turk
Bitlis	Bingöl	Mehmet Ali Bey	Independent	Turk
Bitlis	Siirt	Sheikh Nasreddin Efendi	Independent	Kurd
Van	Van	Arshak Vramian (Note: Killed by gendarmes in Beşiri for assisting Van rebellion)	Armenian Revolutionary Federation	Armenian
Van	Van	Vahan Papazian	Armenian Revolutionary Federation	Armenian
Van	Van	Asaf Süleyman (Doras)	Independent	Armenian
Van	Hakkari	Muhammed Hamza Bey	Independent	Arab (?)
Van	Hakkari	Münib (Boya)	Independent	Turk
Independent	Zor	Mehmet Nuri Efendi	Independent	Turk
Aleppo	Aleppo	Artin Boshgezenyan	Union and Progress Party	Armenian
Aleppo	Aleppo	Ali Münif (Yeğenağa)	Union and Progress Party	Turk
Aleppo	Aleppo	Türkmenzade Ahmed	Independent	Turk
Aleppo	Aleppo	Emrizade Bashir Efendi	Independent	Arab
Aleppo	Aleppo	Hamid Bey	Independent	Arab
Aleppo	Antep (Gaziantep)	Mehmet Ali Cenani	Union and Progress Party	Turk
Aleppo	Antep (Gaziantep)	Hacı Mustafa Efendi	Independent	Turk
Aleppo	Antep (Gaziantep)	Hüseyin Fazıl Bey	Independent	Turk
Aleppo	Maraş (Kahramanmaraş)	İsmail Hakkı Bey	Union and Progress Party	Turk
Aleppo	Maraş (Kahramanmaraş)	Şevketzâde Abdülkadir (Emirmahmutoğlu)	Independent	Turk
Aleppo	Maraş (Kahramanmaraş)	Agop Hiralakyan	Independent	Armenian
Beirut	Trablusşam (Tripoli, Lebanon)	Osman Pasha al-Muhammed	Independent	Arab
Beirut	Trablusşam (Tripoli, Lebanon)	Saadullah Molla Bey	Independent	Arab
Beirut	Beirut	Kamel Khalil al-Asaad	Union and Progress Party	Arab
Beirut	Beirut	Salim Ali Salam	Independent	Arab
Beirut	Beirut	Mishel Sersak Efendi	Independent	Arab
Beirut	Acre	Abdul Fattah al-Saadi Efendi	Independent	Arab
Beirut	Nablus	Amin Abdulhadi Efendi	Independent	Arab
Beirut	Nablus	Tewfik Hamad Efendi	Independent	Arab
Beirut	Lazikiye (Latakia)	Abdul Walid Harun Efendi	Independent	Arab
Independent	Mount Lebanon Mutasarrifate	Adil Arslan	Freedom and Accord Party	Arab
Independent	Mount Lebanon Mutasarrifate	Prince Haris Shehab	Independent	Arab
Independent	Mount Lebanon Mutasarrifate	Rashid al-Rami	Independent	Arab
Syria	Damascus	Muhammed Fevzi Pasha	Union and Progress Party	Arab
Syria	Damascus	Bedii al-Mueyyed Bey	Union and Progress Party	Arab
Syria	Damascus	Amir Ali Pasha (Note: Resigned in 1916)	Freedom and Accord Party	Arab
Syria	Damascus	Murdumzade Sami Pasha (Note: Elected deputy from Damascus in Emir Ali Pasha's place)	Independent	Arab
Syria	Damascus	Awni Bey	Independent	Arab
Syria	Damascus	Fares al-Khoury (Note: Resigned in 1916)	Independent	Arab
Syria	Damascus	Kuvvetlizade Shafiq Bey al-Azm (Note: Elected deputy from Damascus in Fares al-Khoury's place)	Independent	Arab
Syria	Hama	Wasfi al-Atassi	Independent	Arab
Syria	Hama	Abdul Qader al-Keilani	Independent	Arab
Syria	Havran	Shakib Arslan	Independent	Arab
Syria	Havran	Mikdatzâde Saadettin	Independent	Arab
Syria	Karak	Tawfiq al-Mejali Efendi	Independent	Arab
Independent	Jerusalem Mutasarrifate	Said al-Huseyini	Freedom and Accord Party	Arab
Independent	Jerusalem Mutasarrifate	Raghip al-Nashashibi	Freedom and Accord Party	Arab
Independent	Jerusalem Mutasarrifate	Faidi al-Alami	Independent	Arab
Hejaz	Jeddah	Sharif Faisal bin Al-Hussein	Independent	Arab
Hejaz	Mecca	Sharif Abdullah bin Al-Hussein	Independent	Arab
Hejaz	Mecca	Hasan Sheybi Efendi	Independent	Arab
Independent	Medina	Memun Berri	Freedom and Accord Party	Arab
Independent	Medina	Said Ahmed Safi Efendi	Freedom and Accord Party	Arab
Yemen	Asir	Said Yusuf Fazil Bey	Independent	Arab
Yemen	Asir	Said Abdul Wahab Efendi	Independent	Arab
Yemen	Asir	Ali Haydar Bey	Independent	Arab
Yemen	Taiz	Ali Osman Efendi	Union and Progress Party	Turk
Yemen	Taiz	Tahir Fayzi Bey	Independent	Turk
Yemen	Taiz	Abu Bakr Haddad Efendi	Independent	Arab
Yemen	Taiz	Said Ahmed Pasha	Independent	Arab
Yemen	Taiz	Ismail Gurbani Efendi	Independent	Arab
Yemen	Sanaa	Said Huseyin Abdul Qadir Bey	Independent	Arab
Yemen	Sanaa	Said Ahmed Habani Bey	Independent	Arab
Yemen	Sanaa	Qadi Muhammed Makhafi Efendi	Independent	Arab
Yemen	Sanaa	Said Ali Ibrahim Efendi	Independent	Arab
Yemen	Sanaa	Said Ahmed Yahya al-Keysi Efendi	Independent	Arab
Yemen	Al Hudaydah	Hasan Rıza Pasha (Note: Elected in 1916 to replace Zühdü Efendi)	Union and Progress Party	Turk
Yemen	Al Hudaydah	Mustafa Fehmi Bey	Independent	Turk
Yemen	Al Hudaydah	Hıfzi Bey	Independent	Turk
Yemen	Al Hudaydah	Hakkı İlhami Bey	Independent	Turk
Yemen	Al Hudaydah	Zühdü Efendi (Note: Resigned in 1915)	Independent	Turk
Yemen	Al Hudaydah	Abdurrahman Behkali Efendi	Independent	Arab
Basra	Basra	Babanzade Ahmed Naim	Union and Progress Party	Kurd
Basra	Basra	Suleyman Feyzi	Independent	Arab
Basra	Basra	Abdurrezak Bey	Independent	Arab
Basra	Basra	Talip ibn Rajap	Independent	Arab
Basra	Basra	Hajji Isa Ruhi Efendi	Independent	Arab
Basra	Basra	Abdullah Said Bey	Independent	Arab
Basra	Basra	Mehmet Hilmi Bey	Independent	Turk (?)
Basra	Müntefik	Ferid Pashazade Abdunmuhsin Bey	Union and Progress Party	Arab
Basra	Müntefik	Maruf Erhesafi Efendi	Independent	Arab
Basra	Müntefik	Muhammed Kureysh	Independent	Arab
Basra	Ammare	Abdul Karim Bey	Independent	Arab
Basra	Ammare	Abdul Mejid	Independent	Arab
Basra	Ammare	Şükrü Efendi	Independent	Turk (?)
Baghdad	Divaniye	Suleymanbeyzâde Khalid Bey	Independent	Arab
Baghdad	Divaniye	Ali Haydar Midhat	Independent	Turk
Baghdad	Divaniye	Cabecizâde Fuad	Independent	Turk
Baghdad	Divaniye	Dr. Sami Bey	Independent	Turk
Baghdad	Kerbala	Mehmet Sami (Çölgeçen)	Union and Progress Party	Turk
Baghdad	Kerbala	Nuri Bey	Independent	Turk
Baghdad	Kerbala	Abdul Mahdi	Independent	Arab
Baghdad	Baghdad	Sassoon Eskell	Union and Progress Party	Jewish
Baghdad	Baghdad	Fuad al-Defteri Bey	Independent	Arab
Baghdad	Baghdad	Tawfiq al-Khalidi Bey	Independent	Arab
Baghdad	Baghdad	Beyzade Shawkat Pasha al-Rifat	Independent	Arab
Baghdad	Baghdad	Suleymanzade Murad Bey	Independent	Arab
Baghdad	Baghdad	Jamil Sidqi al-Zahawi	Independent	Arab
Baghdad	Baghdad	Hamdi Bey	Independent	Turk
Mosul	Kirkuk	Mehmed Ali	Independent	Turk (?)
Mosul	Kirkuk	Nâzım Bey	Independent	Turk (?)
Mosul	Kirkuk	Abdullah Safi Efendi	Independent	Arab
Mosul	Sulaymaniyah	Babanzade Hikmet Bey	Union and Progress Party	Kurd
Mosul	Sulaymaniyah	Haji Said	Union and Progress Party	Arab
Mosul	Mosul	Hacı Mehmet Emin (Yurdakul)	Union and Progress Party	Turk
Mosul	Mosul	Davud Yusufani	Freedom and Accord Party	Assyrian
Mosul	Mosul	Salih Saadi Bey	Independent	Arab
Mosul	Mosul	Muhammed Ali Fazil	Independent	Arab
Mosul	Mosul	Ibrahim Fawzi Efendi	Independent	Arab

== Sources ==
- Ahmad, Feroz; Rustow, Dankwart A. (1976). "İkinci Meşrutiyet Döneminde Meclisler: 1908 - 1918". Güneydoğu Avrupa Araştırmaları Dergisi (4–5). Archived from the original on November 8, 2016 – via Dergi Park.
- Rustow, Feroz Ahmad A. (8 March 2012). "İkinci Meşrutiyet Döneminde Meclisler: 1908-1918". Güneydoğu Avrupa Araştırmaları Dergisi (in Turkish) (4–5): 0. ISSN 0378-3863.
- "Türkiye Büyük Millet Meclisi İntranet Sitesi" (PDF). Www5.TBMM.gov.tr.
- Hasan, Kayalı (1995). "Elections and the Electoral Process in the Ottoman Empire, 1876-1919" (PDF). International Journal of Middle East Studies. 27 (3): 265–286. doi:10.1017/S0020743800062085. JSTOR 176251. S2CID 44470151 – via Cambridge University Press.
