= Emmanouilidis =

Emmanouilidis is a surname. Notable people with the surname include:

- Dimitrios Emmanouilidis
- Emmanouil Emmanouilidis
- Pavlos Emmanouilidis
