= Filip Mișea =

Aromanian activist, physician and politician

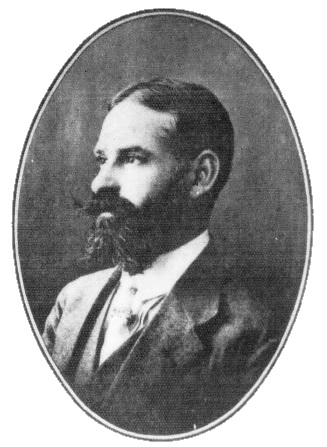
- Mișea in or around 1908
- Born: 1873; Chroupista, Ottoman Empire (now Argos Orestiko, Greece)
- Died: 16 May 1944 (aged 70–71)
- Education: Romanian High School of Bitola; Carol Davila University of Medicine and Pharmacy
- Occupations: Activist, physician and politician
- Spouse: Virginia Mustață

Filip Mișea (1873 – 16 May 1944; Turkish: Filip Mişa or Filip Mise Efendi) was an Aromanian activist, physician and politician. Mișea became an Ottoman deputy, with him and Nicolae Constantin Batzaria being the only Aromanians to ever enter the Ottoman parliament. He would later move to Romania and devote himself to medicine there.

== Biography ==
Mișea was born in 1873 in Chroupista (Aromanian: Hrupishte), then in the Ottoman Empire and now in Greece and known as Argos Orestiko. His father was a professor while his mother was a housewife. After graduating from the Romanian High School of Bitola, Mișea migrated to Romania in 1893, graduating from the Carol Davila University of Medicine and Pharmacy in 1899. During his studies, Mișea had to work to earn a salary with which to pay them. Mișea wrote articles in several Aromanian publications on the history of the settlement of the village of Gramos (Gramosta) and of local legends from the locality. The most important are an article written for Gazeta Macedoniei ("Macedonia's Gazette") in 1897, in which Mișea includes legends explaining the depopulation and ruin of Gramos; and another for Lumina ("Light") from 1907, in which he explains the history of the village. Mișea used the pseudonym "Ciuma alu Penți" when writing in these publications. After working on several internships and externships after his graduation, he was pressured by his professor Thoma Ionescu, a Romanian surgeon, to return to the Ottoman Empire to fulfill his "mission" with his Aromanian brothers, which he eventually did together with his wife Virginia Mustață from Ploiești.

There, Mișea joined the Young Turks and became a deputy of the Sanjak of Görice (Korçë; Curceaua, Curceauã, Curceau or Curciau) for the legislatures of 1908 and 1912. He was the only Aromanian to enter the Ottoman parliament apart from Nicolae Constantin Batzaria, who became an Ottoman senator. The only non-Muslim Ottoman population groups the Young Turks' Committee of Union and Progress (CPU) ever recruited members from were the Aromanians and the Jews. The strategy Batzaria and Mișea aimed for was to find a common cause with the Ottoman authorities, who sought a revitalization of the status quo, in order to have an ally against nationalist organizations from other communities within the Ottoman Empire that threatened the national movement of the Aromanians. On the other hand, the CPU benefited from having Christian allies who could serve as examples for other Christian minorities of the empire, such as the Bulgarians or the Greeks. An Aromanian–Ottoman alliance was formed following negotiations between the CPU and the Macedo-Romanian Cultural Society in which Mișea himself participated, as he was the latter's propaganda director.

In December 1913, Mișea returned to Romania after pressure from his wife and from the Romanian politician Take Ionescu, brother of his former professor Thoma, but also after considering his mission for the Aromanian cause accomplished and to raise his three newborn children. Mișea decided to leave the political scene and settled in Buzău after having worked in several rural hospitals in other Romanian localities. During World War I, Mișea worked as a doctor in a hospital in Bacău, being later transferred to a military hospital in Negrești, where he treated many wounded soldiers. During this period, he fell ill with epidemic typhus, although he quickly recovered. In the years 1920 and 1921, Mișea became one of the leading figures of the newly established Hospital of Infectious and Contagious Diseases of Buzău, where he worked until his retirement in 1938. Furthermore, the Aromanian linguist Matilda Caragiu Marioțeanu states on her 2003 work Toma Caragiu – Ipostaze ("Toma Caragiu – Hypostases") that Mișea helped Toma Caragiu, who later became a famous actor, overcome an enterocolitis at the age of one year and eight or nine months in Chroupista. She also writes that Mișea was called "Fil'io" by the Caragiu family and that he was her mother's godfather. In 1929, Mișea's wife Virginia died, and he was left a widower and never married again. Both had a total of six children, some of whom later dedicated themselves to medicine as well. Mișea died on 16 May 1944.
