= Pashayan =

Pashayan (Armenian: Փաշայան) is an Armenian surname. Notable people with the surname include:

- Benur Pashayan (1959 - 2019), Armenian Greco-Roman wrestler
- Chip Pashayan (born 1941), American lawyer and politician
- Garabed Pashayan Khan (1864 - 1915), Armenian physician and doctor
