= Mehmed Cavid =

Ottoman economist, writer, and politician (1875–1926)

Mehmet Cavit Bey
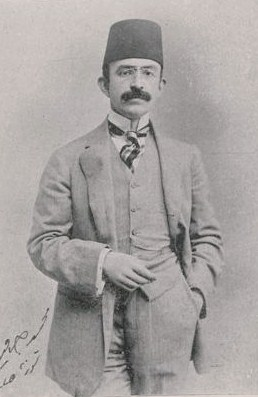
- Cavid Bey in 1918

Minister of Finance
- In office July 1909 – October 1911
- Monarch: Mehmed V
- Preceded by: Mehmed Rifat Bey
- Succeeded by: Mustafa Nail Bey
- In office March 1914 – November 1914
- Monarch: Mehmed V
- Preceded by: Abdurrahman Vefik Sayın
- Succeeded by: Talaat Pasha

Member of the Chamber of Deputies
- Constituency: Selanik (1908, 1912); Kale-i Sultaniye (1914)

Personal details
- Born: 1875 Selanik, Salonica Vilayet, Ottoman Empire
- Died: 26 August 1926 (aged 50–51) Ankara, Turkey
- Education: Mekteb-i Mülkiye
- Occupation: Politician; economist; newspaper editor

Mehmed Cavid Bey, Mehmet Cavit or Mehmed Djavid (Ottoman Turkish: محمد جاوید بك; 1875 – 26 August 1926) was a Dönme Ottoman economist, newspaper editor and leading liberal politician during the dissolution period of the Ottoman Empire. As a Young Turk and a member of the Committee of Union and Progress (CUP) he had positions in government after the constitution was re-established. In the beginning of the Republican period, he was controversially tried and executed for his alleged involvement in an assassination attempt against Mustafa Kemal Atatürk.

== Early years and career ==
Mehmed Cavit was born in Salonica in 1875. His father was Recep Naim Efendi, a merchant, and his mother was Pakize; they were cousins. He had two brothers and two sisters. His family had links to followers of Sabbatai Zevi, and he was a Dönme, making him a crypto-Jew. He learned Greek and French, attending the progressive Şemsi Efendi School, the same school as Mustafa Kemal Pasha attended. He attended the Mekteb-i Mülkiye in Istanbul for civil servants, and upon graduation he secured employment with a state bank, and at the same time taught economics and worked within the Ministry of Education.

Cavit was more successful than the average state employee in Istanbul, but for unknown reasons he decided to leave his budding career and move back to Salonica. As fears of partition grew in Salonica amidst the spreading insurrections and violence of the Balkans and the autocratic rule and inaction of Abdülhamid II, foreign influence over the Ottoman state also grew (along with the nation's debt). Cavid among others believed that the sultan had to step aside for the good of the empire. He was an early inductee of the Ottoman Freedom Committee. This core group soon affiliated itself with the Committee of Union and Progress (CUP), called the Young Turks by foreign press.

In Salonica he worked as a principal and teacher at the Feyziye Schools. Between 1908 and 1911, he published the Ulum-ı İktisâdiye ve İçtimâiye Mecmuası (Journal for Economic Thought and Social Media), together with Rıza Tevfik and Ahmet Şuayip in Istanbul, which advocated liberalism.

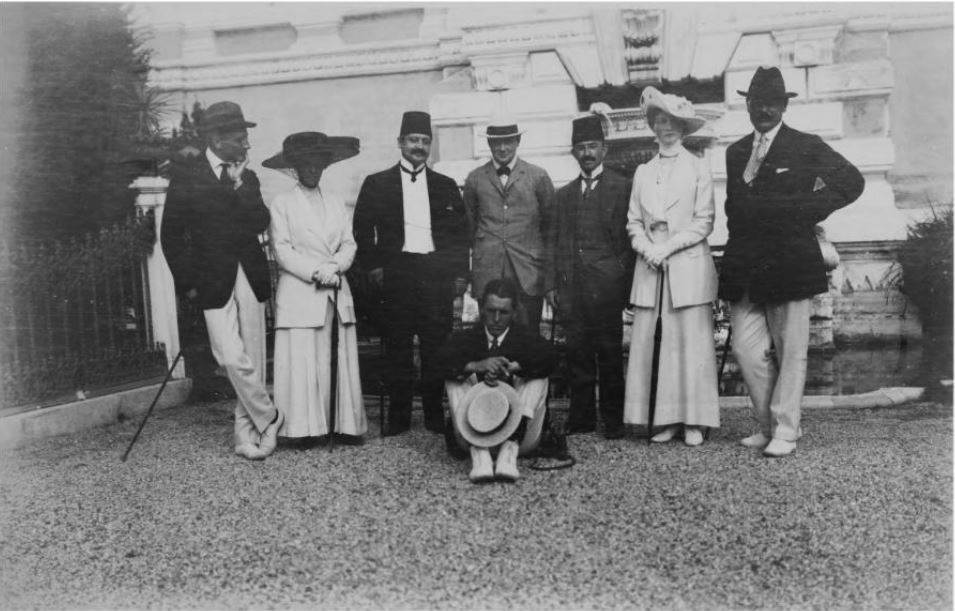
Winston Churchill between Talaat Bey and Cavid Bey (both wearing fezzes) during his private stay in Istanbul in July 1910

After the proclamation of the Second Constitutional Era in 1908, he was elected MP of Salonica in 1908 and 1912, switching to Kale-i Sultaniye (Çanakkale) in 1914. Following the 31 March Incident in 1909, Cavit Bey was appointed minister of finance in the cabinet of Grand Vizier Tevfik Pasha, from then on he was appointed and resigned from this position several times. He modernized Ottoman finances and fought to abolish the capitulations, and had the goal to create a Turkish bourgeoisie class. In the aftermath of the 1912 Ottoman coup d'état and repression of the CUP, Cavit hid in a French battleship and escaped to Marseilles. He would regain his position in the wake of Grand Vizier Mahmud Şevket Pasha's assassination.

== Finance minister ==
Other than encouragement of domestic production projects, the CUP largely followed a liberal economic policy to Mehmed Cavid's designs, resulting in a large increase in foreign investment between 1908 and 1913 despite the volatility of the Ottoman Empire's international standing. This coincided with new law codes which were to encourage foreign investment: a new land law in 1911, and a inheritance law in 1913. In December 1909, Cavid published the first modern budget of the Ottoman Empire, without attempts to brush over its financial problems, after improving the tax collection system. Investors were still skeptical of the country's instability following the revolution, notably the Ottoman Bank, a financial consortium controlled by French and British financiers, denied a loan of acceptable terms to the Ottoman government in 1910. This cash inflow was in demand due to Mahmud Shevket Pasha's demand for steep military spending and the pensioning of many civil servants whom were deemed to have overstaffed the government. Turning to another French consortium, the French government refused the loan to be floated on the stock exchange. Cavid's position was saved when Deutsche Bank offered a loan with no strings attached, which earned the Germans a lot of good will. Cavid was eventually forced to resign from the finance ministry as a result of an expose by Zeki Bey of his conspicuously irregular financial dealings with the National Bank of Turkey.

== The Great War ==
Following the orchestrated Black Sea Raid on Russian ports in 1914 and the subsequent entry of the Ottoman Empire into World War I, Cavit and half the CUP cabinet resigned in protest. For the next few weeks, central committee comrade Doctor Nâzım, himself also a Dönme, would bully Cavit for being a "treacherous Jew". He remained an influential figure in the Empire's dealings with Germany until he basically returned to his post in February 1917. In 1917 he gave a speech, famously declaring: “We are patriots [biz milliyetperveriz]. We do not want all initiatives to be made in our country to be made by foreigners and we to be guests. No!” He was among the founders of İtibar-ı Milli Bankası (Crédit National Ottoman), which was planned to become a national bank. Some have written of this initiative as economic jihad.

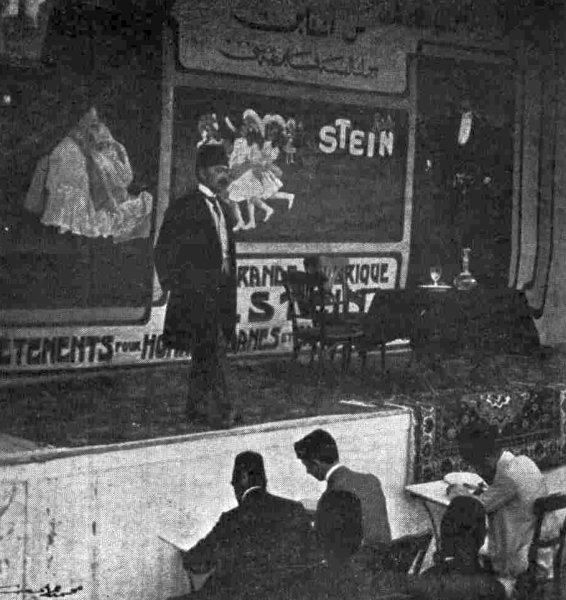
Mehmed Cavid delivering a lecture as Finance Minister, 26 August 1910, Salonica

During World War I, Cavid was not fully trusted by the CUP leadership. He did not find out about the massive deportations of Armenians until August 1915, and condemned it in his diary, writing "Ottoman history has never opened its pages, even during the time of the Middle Ages, onto such determined murder[s] and large scale cruelty."

If you want to bloody the Armenian question politically, then you scatter the people in the Armenian provinces, but scatter them in a humane manner. Hang the traitors, even if there are thousands of them. Who would entertain hiding Russians [and] the supporters of Russians? But stop right there. You dared to annihilate the existence of an entire nation, not [only] their political existence. You are both iniquitous and incapable. What kind of conscience must you have to [be able to] accept the drowning, in the mountains and next to lakes, of those women, children and the elderly who were taken to the countryside!

He lamented, "With these acts we have [ruined] everything. We put an irremovable stain on the current administration."

With İzzet Pasha's resignation, Cavid no longer took part in government. He represented the Ottoman Empire in postwar financial negotiations in London and Berlin. After the war, Cavit Bey was tried in the Special Military Court Tribunal (Aliye Divan-ı Harb-i Örfi), which was established by the occupation authorities in Istanbul. When he was sentenced to 15 years of hard labor, he escaped to Switzerland. After accompanying Ankara's representative Bekir Sami Bey at the London Conference held in February 1921, he returned to Turkey in July 1922 to join the Turkish Nationalist Movement. He was a member of the Ankara delegation that signed the Treaty of Lausanne.

== Execution ==
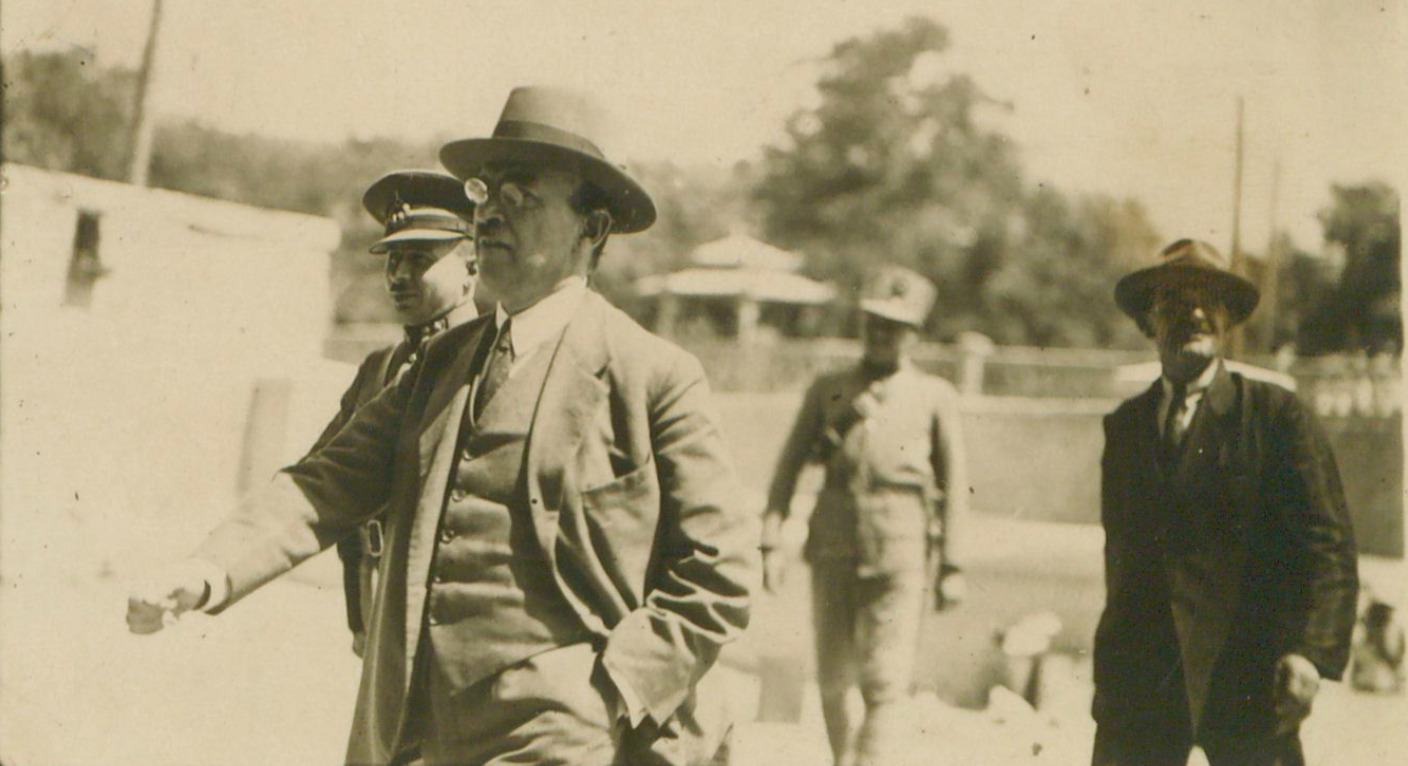
Mehmet Cavit Bey in 1926

In the early period of the Republican era, Mehmet Cavit Bey was charged with involvement in the assassination attempt in İzmir against Mustafa Kemal Pasha (Atatürk). The judges of the Independence Tribunal who tried him did not find his defense sufficient to prove his innocence, and Cavit Bey was convicted and later executed by hanging on 26 August 1926 in Ankara. Doctor Nâzım, Yenibahçeli Nail Bey and Hilmi Bey were executed with him. İsmet İnönü's memoirs reveal that Cavid had nothing to do with the İzmir assassination attempt, that he was innocent and that he was executed unjustly. Albert Sarraut, who was the French Ambassador to Ankara during 1925-1926, met directly with Mustafa Kemal and asked for Cavid Bey's clemency.

The letters which Cavit Bey wrote to his wife Aliye Nazlı during his imprisonment were given to her only after his execution. She had the letters published later as a book entitled, Zindandan Mektuplar ("Letters from the Dungeon").

Cavid's grave was kept secret from the public, but it was found in 1950. His remains were transferred and reinterred at the Cebeci Asri Cemetery in Ankara.

== Personal life ==
Mehmed Cavid Bey was twice married. He lived a single life for many years after his first wife, Saniye Hanım, died at an early age from tuberculosis in 1909. She was one of his relatives, and they married in 1906 while he was in Thessaloniki. They had no children from this marriage.

In 1921, Mehmet Cavit Bey married Aliye Nazlı Hanım, the divorced wife of Şehzade Mehmed Burhaneddin. In 1924, their son Osman Şiar was born. After Cavit Bey's execution, his son was raised by his close friend Hüseyin Cahit Yalçın. Following the enactment of the Surname Law in 1934, Osman Şiar adopted the surname Yalçın. Cavid's siblings took the surname Gerçel.

Cavid served as Grand Master of the Grand Lodge of Free and Accepted Masons between 1916 and 1918.

== Bibliography ==
- Zindandan Mektuplar (2005) Liberte Yayınları, 212 pp. ISBN 9789756877913
- Kieser, Hans-Lukas (26 June 2018), Talaat Pasha: Father of Modern Turkey, Architect of Genocide, Princeton University Press (published 2018), ISBN 978-0-691-15762-7
