= Artin Boshgezenian =

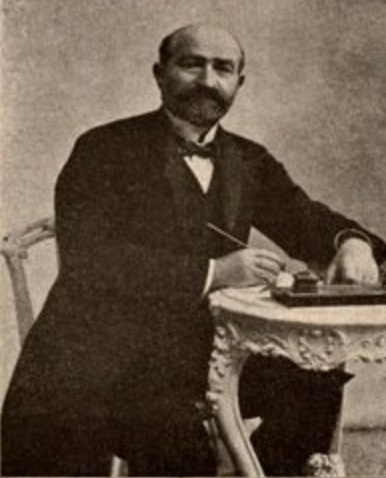

Member of the Chamber of Deputies
- Constituency: Aleppo (1908, 1912, 1914)

Personal details
- Born: 1861 Antep, Ottoman Empire
- Died: 1923 (aged 61–62) Aleppo, State of Aleppo
- Citizenship: Ottoman Empire
- Party: Committee of Union and Progress

Artin Boshgezenian (1861-1923), was an Armenian deputy for Aleppo in the first (1908–1912), second (April–August 1912) and third (1914–1918) Ottoman Parliaments of the Constitutional Era.

== Life ==
He was a left-leaning politician who supported workers' rights and women's suffrage. He was the author of a motion to make adultery a civil offense for men, as against the traditional view which held only women punishable for adultery.

=== Speech ===
During the brief period between the collapse of the Committee of Union and Progress regime in October 1918 and the dissolution of the parliament in December 1918, Boshgezenian made several strong speeches denouncing the outgoing government for crimes committed during the Armenian genocide. He was a judge in the War Crimes Tribunal which led to the conviction and hanging of Mehmed Kemâl Bey, the notorious district governor of Boğazlıyan, who was accused of atrocities against the deported Armenians in the central Anatolian province of Yozgat.

Boshgezenian speaking about the law on deportation,

The matter is not finished simply by ending the law... The law is a knife, an ax, responsible for so many crimes. Let us not attempt to correct these crimes just by blunting the knife... A great deal of innocent blood has been spilled as a result... It is impossible to determine the number of burned or destroyed homes. This threeline law is a fearful thing. We must overturn it in both form and substance... But along with cancelling it, we must also move to punishment, without exception, of those who destroyed the country on the basis of this law; those who used and exploited the law by conspiring to murder must be punished. The matter is not ended just by putting away the weapons.
