= Reşit Ronabar =

Turkish politician (1868–1924)

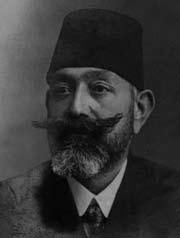
Reşit Ronabar

Mektubîzade M. Reşit Ronabar Pasha, commonly known as Reşit Ronabar or Reşit Pasha (born in 1868 in Damascus, Ottoman Syria - died in 1924 in the Republic of Turkey) was an Ottoman governor who served in the Balkans, Edirne, Kastamonu, Ankara, Sivas, and several other locations in the Mediterranean. He was also a deputy in the first Ottoman Parliament (1916), and played an important role as a politician during the foundation years of the Republic of Turkey.
