= Traianos Nallis =

Greek notable and politician

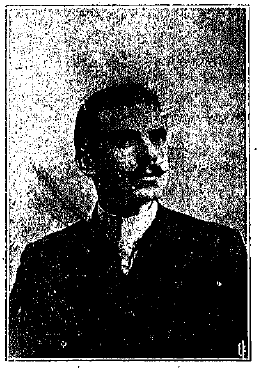
Traianos Nallis in 1910

Traianos Nallis (Greek: Τραϊανός Νάλλης, Turkish: Trayan Nali Efendi) was a Greek notable and politician.

== Biography ==
Nallis was born in 1874 in Gradešnica, then in the Ottoman Empire (now in North Macedonia). He grew up in Monastir (now Bitola), where his family had moved for security. His brother Stavros was one of the three founders of the Interior Organization of Monastir in 1904. Nallis was a notable of the Greek community and was elected in 1908 as a representative of the Greek community of the kaza of Monastir to the Ottoman Chamber of Deputies following the Young Turk Revolution. His election was a tremendous success for the local Greeks, as the election period was characterized by unprecedented violence as the Young Turks were trying to make as many Greeks as they could not to vote. Traianos Nallis was one of the three Greek deputies who were elected in the Monastir Vilayet and re-elected in the 1912 elections.

== Sources ==
- Θέματα Ελληνικής Ιστορίας, Η Νεοτουρκική Επανάσταση, ο τερματισμός του Μακεδονικού Αγώνα και οι πρώτες εκλογές στην Οθωμανική Αυτοκρατορία
- Γεώργιος Γκλιάτης, Η Ελλάδα 100 χρόνια πριν
- Κωσταραζινό, Ο Μακεδονικός Αγώνας (μέρος 3ο): Η ένοπλη φάση (1904-1908)
- Aykut Kansu, The Revolution of 1908 in Turkey, publications Brill, 1955, p. 228, 250
- Members of the Meclis-I Mebusan, 1912
- μηνιαία Εφημερίδα Άργους Ορεστικού: Ορεστίς, April 2012, στήλη: Πριν από 100 χρόνια, Απρίλιος 1912, p. 4
