= Georgios Kourtoglou =

Greek politician, legal/social activist, and governor

Georgios Kourtoglou Pasha
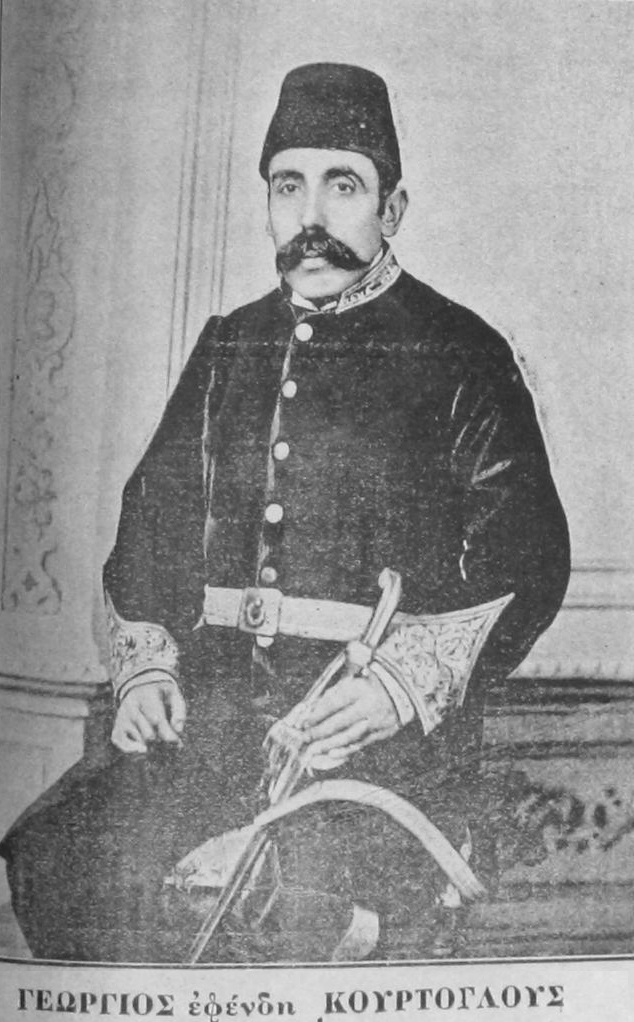
- Photograph of Georgios Kourtoglou.

Governor of Niğde
- In office 1908–1912

Personal details
- Born: 1856 Niğde, Ottoman Empire
- Died: Unknown

Georgios Kourtoglou (Greek: Γεώργιος Κούρτογλου; Turkish: Yorgaki Kurtoğlu Efendi also known as Yorgaki Efendi; born 1856, Nigde), was an Ottoman Greek political, legal, and social activist, and a governor in the late Ottoman Empire. He was elected to be part of the new Ottoman parliament in 1908, after the Young Turk Revolution. He was elected deputy of Niğde in the Konya Vilayet.

== Biography ==
Georgios Kourtoglou was born in Niğde in 1856 to a Cappadocian Greek family. During his lifetime he held high ranking administrative offices in the Ottoman Empire including deputy of Niğde in Cappadocia, a position which he held from 1908 until 1912.
