= Ali Münif Yeğenağa =

Turkish politician

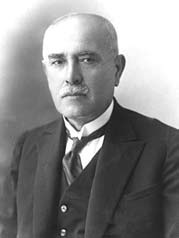

Personal details
- Born: 1874 Adana, Ottoman Empire
- Died: 1950 (aged 75–76) Adana, Turkey
- Party: Committee of Union and Progress

Ali Münif Yeğenağa (1874 – 1950) was an Ottoman politician and government minister, who played an active role in the Young Turk Revolution, he also served as the Minister of Education of the Ottoman Empire in 1918. He was furthermore a close friend of Talaat Pasha and played a prominent role in the Armenian genocide.
