= Mustafa Nail Bey =

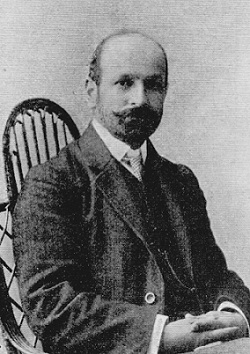

Personal details
- Born: 1861
- Died: 1922 (aged 60–61)

Mustafa Nail Bey (1861–1922) was an Ottoman liberal politician and minister during the Second Constitutional Era.
