= Garabed Pashayan Khan =

Garabed Pashayan (1864, Constantinople – 1915) was an Armenian medical doctor and public activist. He lived in the Ottoman Empire.

He completed his studies at the Medical College of Constantinople in 1888, then worked as a doctor in Balu and Malatia provinces. In 1890 he was arrested for the support of Armenian fedayee groups, was sentenced to death but then released after the mediation of the British consul's family. In 1895 he moved to Iran and became the Persian shah's doctor. For his efforts he was awarded the khan title. In 1903-1906 Pashayan lived in Alexandria, Egypt, where he founded an Armenian school and a printing house. In 1908 after the Young Turk revolution he returned to Constantinople and was elected as a member of the Ottoman parliament. In 1915 he was arrested among the other Armenian intellectuals and was sent to Ayash, where he was tortured and killed.

Pashayan is an author of literary and scientific works ("The Friends of the People", 1909).

== Sources ==
- The Doctors who became Victims of the Great Calamity, G. Karoyan, Boston, 1957, pp. 24–36
- "Armenian Question", encyclopedia, ed. by acad. K. Khudaverdyan, Yerevan, 1996, p. 452
