= Emmanouil Emmanouilidis =

Effendi Emmanuil Emmanuilidis
- Εμμανουήλ Εμμανουηλίδης

Member of the Chamber of Deputies
- Constituency: İzmir (1908), (1912); Aydın (1914)

Personal details
- Born: 1867 Tavlusun, Melikgazi, Ottoman Empire
- Died: 1943 (aged 75–76) Athens, Greece
- Party: Committee of Union and Progress

Emmanouil Emmanouilidis (Greek: Εμμανουήλ Εμμανουηλίδης; 1867–1943) was an Ottoman Greek and Greek jurist and politician. He was a representative for the Committee of Union and Progress during the Second Constitutional Era. He served in the Chamber of Deputies from Izmir and was one of the deputies who criticized the press law of 1915.

== Biography ==
Emmanouilidis Efendi graduated from Istanbul Law School. He worked as a jurist in Izmir and Athens. He was a member of the Greek Elders' Council [Rum İhtiyar Kurulu] in Izmir several times. As the editor-in-chief of the Izmir Aktis magazine, he defended the use of Demotic Greek and earned the hostility of the conservatives who advocated the re-imposition of Katharevousa and the enactment of this language in the Greek parliament. When Aristidi Pasha was appointed as a member of the Senate on 31 January 1911, Emmanouilidis was elected as a deputy of İzmir. In the 1912 elections, he was reelected as a deputy of İzmir and in the 1914 elections, he was elected as a representative of Aydın.

After the Greco-Turkish War, he had to move to Athens and in the 1923 parliamentary elections, he was elected as the full-fledged representative of Athens-Piraeus. He served as the vice-president of the Greek Parliament from 6 November 1927 to 9 July 1928. He became a member of parliament for Eleftherios Venizelos' Liberal Party and served as Minister of Health in the 1928, June 1929 and December 1929 Venizelos governments.

A street bears his name in Nea Smyrni.

== Published works ==
He wrote many books, the most notable of which is:

- Osmanlı İmparatorluğu'nun Son Yılları [The Last Years of the Ottoman Empire]
