= Faik Kaltakkıran =

Turkish politician

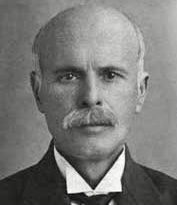

Member of the Grand National Assembly

Personal details
- Born: 1870 Edirne, Ottoman Empire
- Died: 2 January 1948 (aged 77–78)

Mehmet Faik Kaltakkıran (1870, Edirne, Ottoman Empire – 2 January 1948) was a Turkish politician.

== Biography ==
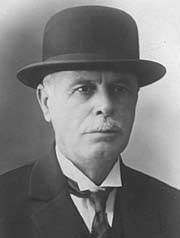
Faik Kaltakkıran in the 1920s

He was born in 1870 in Edirne. He joined the Committee of Union and Progress. Between the years 1908–1919 he served as a deputy of Edirne in the Ottoman parliament. Following the Armistice of Mondros, he participated in the Turkish National Movement activities in the Thrace region. On the 12th of January 1920, the last Ottoman parliament was elected as the deputy of Edirne. He was exiled to Malta by the British occupying Istanbul on March 16, 1920. On July 31, 1920, he was elected as a member of the parliament from Edirne. On May 16, 1921, the parliament had elected him as the second deputy speaker. He died in 1948. During his life in the Turkish Republic, he became a member of the Turkish parliament three times.
