= Matthaios Kofidis =

Ottoman Greek politician and businessman (1855–1921)

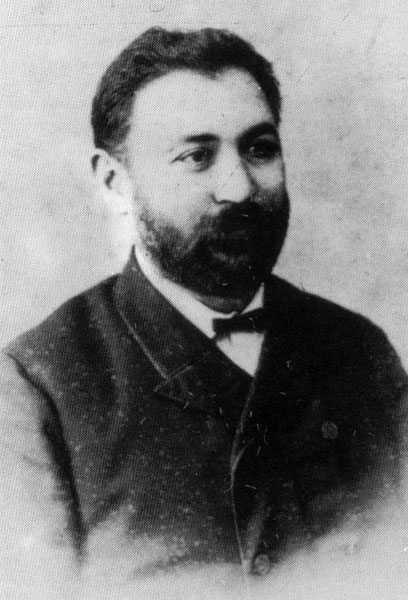

Member of the Ottoman Parliament
- In office 1908–1918

Personal details
- Born: 22 March 1855 Çorum Province, Ottoman Empire
- Died: 1921 (aged 65–66) Amasya, Ottoman Empire
- Occupation: Politician, historian

Matthaios Kofidis (Greek: Ματθαίος Κωφίδης, 22 March 1855 – 1921) was an Ottoman Greek businessman, historian and politician, who was a member of the Ottoman Parliament. He was elected in three successive periods from 1908 to 1918. In 1921 he was among the notables of the Greek community of the Pontus region who were hanged by the Turkish nationalists of Mustafa Kemal during the Pontic Greek genocide.

== Early life and political career ==
Kofidis was born to a Greek family in the Çorum Province, today in modern Turkey. He moved to Trebizond, northeastern Turkey, where he became a member of the local tobacco monopoly.

Kofidis was elected as a member of the Ottoman parliament for the Trebizond Vilayet in three successive election periods: 1908–1912, 1912–1914, and 1914–1918. Initially, he participated in the Young Turk movement. Kofidis, along with a number of Christian Orthodox citizens of the Ottoman Empire, hoped that this movement would favor the various local ethnoreligious groups. However, they soon realized that the ultimate goal of the Young Turks was the imposition of various policies of ethnic cleansing and genocide, which they launched during the following years. The most effective of these were the Greek genocide, Armenian genocide and Assyrian genocide where the Christian population of Anatolia was almost exterminated.

Kofidis represented a district that was severely affected by the ethnic cleansing policies. He became one of the Greek representatives in the Ottoman parliament who vigorously protested and demanded strict measures to stop the ongoing genocide. Under these circumstances, Kofidis tried to handle the situation carefully and negotiated with the Ottoman authorities whenever possible.

In 1917 Kofidis replaced for a short period the Orthodox bishop of Trebizond, Chrysanthus, in his non-religious duties. In 1920, he refused to lead an armed guerrilla struggle in Pontus, in fear that this would cause the destruction of Trebizond by the Turkish national movement.

== Execution ==
In mid-1921 a large part of the local Orthodox Christian male population was deported and sent to labour battalions in Erzerum. Kofidis' son was killed during his deportation. During this time, an "Ad Hoc Court of Turkish Independence" in Amasya, which was controlled by the Turkish nationalists of Mustafa Kemal (later Atatürk), sentenced Kofidis to death by hanging. Kofidis was hanged in Amasya. The same court sentenced to death several notable figures of the local Greek community, especially politicians, businessmen, and religious personalities. All were accused of participating in the establishment of the Republic of Pontus.

The execution of Kofidis angered even the Muslim population of Trebizond, who refused to hand over additional numbers of Pontic Greeks to the Turkish nationalists of Mustafa Kemal.

== Sources ==
- Clark, Bruce (2006). Twice a Stranger: The Mass Expulsion that Forged Modern Greece and Turkey. Cambridge (Massachusetts): Harvard University Press. ISBN 9780674023680.
- Karachristos, Ioannis (15 March 2002). "Kofidis, Matthaios". Encyclopaedia of the Hellenic World, Asia Minor.
- Photiades, Kostas (1985). Die Islamisierung Kleinasiens und die Kryptochristen des Pontos (in German). University of Tübingen.
- Vergeti, Maria (1993). "Ethno-Regional Identity: The Case of Pontian Greeks" (in Greek). Panteion University. doi:10.12681/eadd/2548. hdl:10442/hedi/2548.
