= Sanjak of Görice =

Sanjak of Görice

The Sanjak of Görice or Korçë (Turkish: Görice sancağı) was a second-level administrative unit (sanjak) of the Ottoman Empire centred in Korçë. It was established in the 15th century following Ottoman conquests and disestablished during the Balkan Wars (1912–13). It was one of several sanjaks part of the Manastir Vilayet (1874–1912). It had territory in what is today southeastern Albania and northwestern Greece.

== Sub-districts ==
The sub-districts (kaza) of the sanjak were:

- Görice (Korçë)
- İstarova (Pogradec)
- Kolonya (Ersekë)
- Kesriye (Kastoria)

== Demographics ==
According to French fieldwork conducted in 1913-1914, Greeks made up 2/3 of the Sanjak's population while Albanians made up 1/3. More specifically, Greeks were 58,250 and Albanians were 31,500, with an additional 4,000 Aromanians. In the kaza of Korçë, Greeks were 31,750, Albanians were 14,300 and Aromanians were 3,250.
