= Gegham Ter-Karapetian =

- Gegham Ter-Karapetian
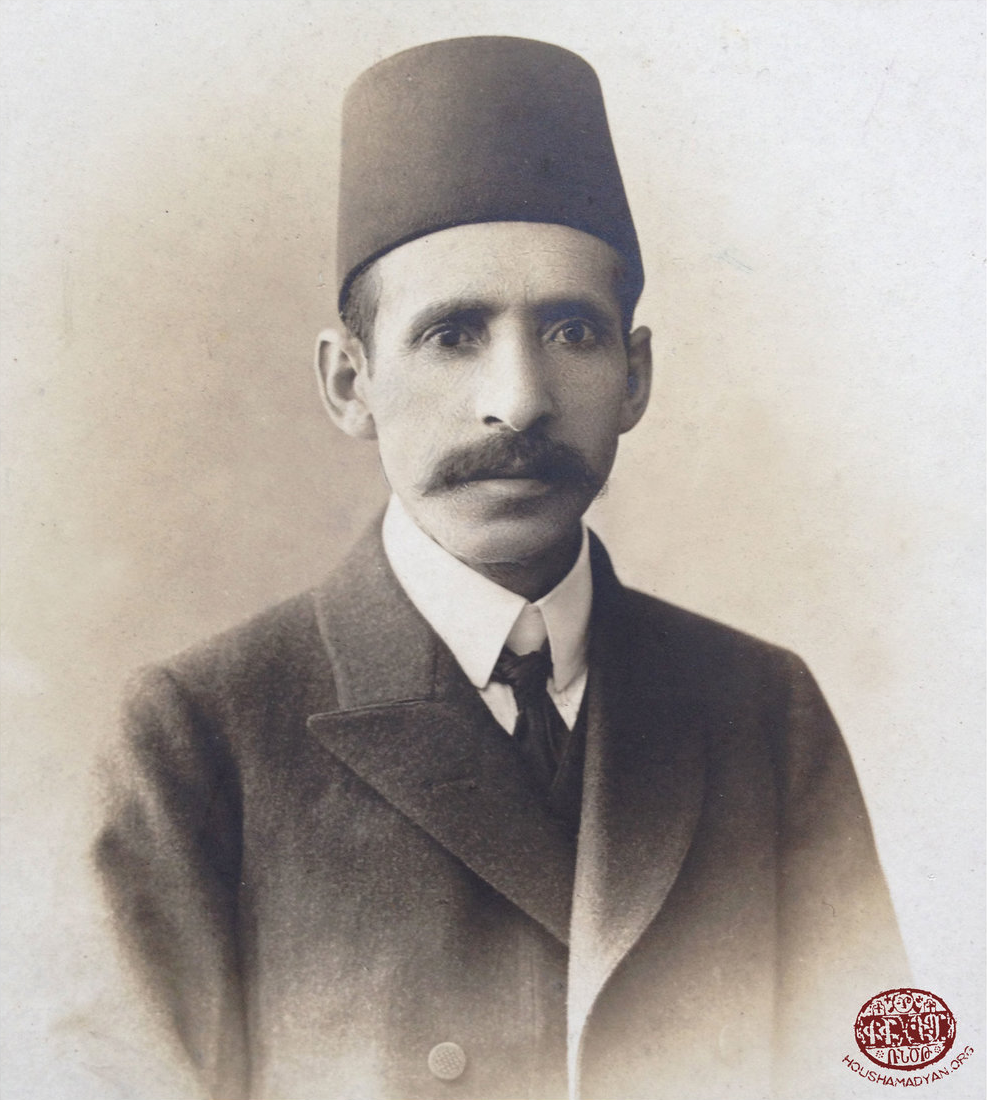
- Born: 1865 village of Kheybian, Bitlis Vilayet, Ottoman Empire
- Died: November 28, 1918 (aged 52–53); Constantinople
- Other names: Msho Gegham
- Occupations: writer and politician

Gegham Ter-Karapetian (Armenian: Գեղամ Տեր-Կարապետեան) (1865-1918), better known by his pen name Msho Gegham (Մշոյ Գեղամ), was a writer and politician in the Ottoman Empire. He was ethnically Armenian.

== Biography ==
Ter-Karapetian was born in 1865 in the village of Kheybian in Bitlis Vilayet, Ottoman Empire.

He was a major writer of Western Armenian provincial literature. He was also a respected journalist and statesman.

Ter-Karapetian served as a deputy in the Ottoman Chamber of Deputies from the Armenian Revolutionary Federation.
