= Ali Cenani =

Turkish politician (1872–1934)

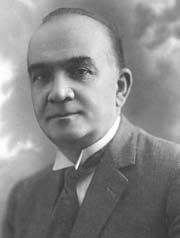
Ali Cenani

Ali Cenani (1872 Constantinople–5 December 1934) was a Turkish politician of the Republican Peoples Party (CHP) and member of the Grand National Assembly of Turkey. He served as a Minister of Commerce in the 1920s during the presidency of Kemal Atatürk. Before, he was also a member of the Ottoman Parliament.

== Early life and education ==
He was born into the Ottoman bureaucratic family of the Cenanizade, of which Grand Vizier Kadri Pasha was also part of. After having graduated from high school, he studied finance and economy.

== Political career ==
He settled in Antep (today Gaziantep) in 1891 and was elected into the Ottoman Parliament in 1908, representing Aleppo. The same year he was elected the head of the Antep branch of the Committee for Union and Progress (CUP), the teacher Taşçızâde Abdullah Effendi became the vice-president. He was re-elected for a second term. As the leader of the CUP in Antep, he was involved in the deportations of the Armenian population during World War I. Even though Cenani played a leading role in the deportations of Armenians, he was tolerant to requests of exemptions of deportation of some wealthy Armenians, which caused a complaint by Ahmet Faik Erner, the Kaymakam of Antep at the time. In 1915, he focused on the deportations of the elite of the Protestant Armenians, of whom he eventually took over many of heir possessions. He was an MP of the Ottoman Parliament until on the 16 March 1916, Constantinople was occupied by the British army. During the Turkish War of Independence, he organized the resistance in the region around Antep in 1918. He reportedly received weapons for this means on the orders of Mustafa Kemal (Atatürk). The British managed to get hold of Cenani in Constantinople on the 24 May 1920 and sent to Malta in November 1920. He and Ahmet Faik Erner, were accused of having been involved in the deportation of about 25'000 Armenians from Antep. Upon his return from Malta, he joined the Kemalist faction and became a member of the Grand National Assembly for Antep. He later became a Minister of Commerce between 22 November 1924 and the 17 May 1926, and served in both, the Governments of Fethi Okyar and also Ismet Inönü. His proposal of a travelling exhibition to visit some European ports on a ship during the budget negotiations in 1925 was realized in June 1926. In 1928, he was investigated for misspending 500,000 TL and sentenced to one month in prison and to pay a fine of 170'000 TL. He died in 1934.
