= 1912 Ottoman general election =

- April 1912

275 seats in the Chamber of Deputies
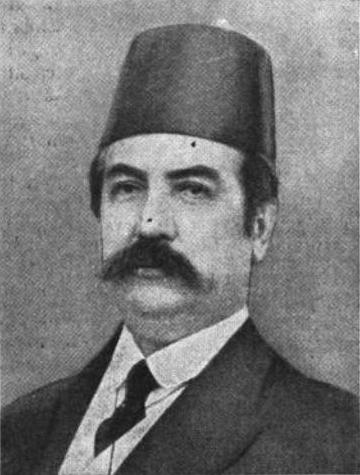
	Majority party	Minority party
	CUP
Leader	Collective leadership	Damat Ferid Pasha
Party	CUP	Freedom & Accord
Seats won	269 (Note: Includes 10 Dashnak MPs)	6
- The Chamber of Deputies after the elections

Early general elections were held in the Ottoman Empire in April 1912. The ruling Committee of Union and Progress won 269 of the 275 seats in the Chamber of Deputies, whilst the opposition Freedom and Accord Party only won six seats, a victory widely deemed fraudulent and won through intimidation.

The election became known as the "Election of Clubs" (Sopalı Seçimler) to history, when Rıza Tevfik (Bölükbaşı), who was running for office as an Accordist in Edirne, revealed how he was taken and beaten by Unionist thugs while campaigning in Komotini.

== Background ==
The elections were announced in January 1912, making them the first early election in Turkish history. They were called after the Committee of Union and Progress (CUP) lost a by-election to the new Freedom and Accord Party in Istanbul the month before, their candidate losing by a just 1 vote. The Freedom and Accord Party was a successor to the Liberty Party of Prince Sabahaddin, which was banned following the 31 March Incident, and served to consolidate anti-Unionist opposition into one party. Founded in November 1911, the December by-election gave the newborn party a great deal of confidence. The CUP had hoped early elections would thwart the new party's momentum.

The early elections, to be held in April 1912, was held in the middle of the Italo-Turkish War and the Yemeni revolt. The Italian capture of Libyan coastal cities made the Tripolitanian deputies restless, and increased scrutiny towards the CUP was pronounced. The lead up to the election saw partisanship heighten between the CUP and its opponents.

== Campaign ==
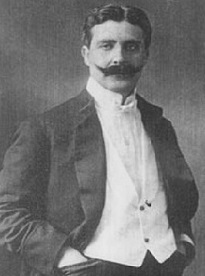
Bahaeddin Şakir, member of the Committee of Union and Progress

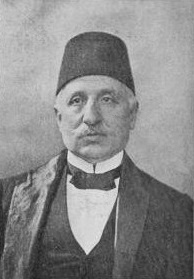
Aristidi Pasha, member of the Freedom and Accord Party

The CUP platform represented centralist tendencies, whilst Freedom and Accord promoted a more decentralised agenda, including supporting allowing education in local languages.

Although the two main parties competing in the election, the CUP and Freedom and Accord, were largely secular in their political outlook, issues such as the Islamic religious piety of their candidates became sensationalised campaign topics. Seeing the potent amount of political capital to be gained by appealing to religion, as the Muslim vote was the most important in the Empire, both parties consistently accused one another of various other supposed offenses against Islamic tradition.

Freedom and Accord members accused the CUP candidates of a "disregard for Islamic principles and values" and of "attempting to restrict the prerogatives of the sultan-caliph", despite the fact that many Freedom and Accord members were quite progressive in their own lives and dealings. In return, the CUP, seeing that its previous policy of secular Ottomanism (Ottoman nationalism) was failing, turned to a similar line of Islamist rhetoric as Freedom and Accord in order to drum up support among the Muslims of the Empire; it accused Freedom and Accord of "weakening Islam and Muslims" by trying to separate the Ottoman sultan's office from the Caliphate. Although this accusation was almost identical to the one leveled by Freedom and Accord at the CUP itself, it was highly effective. Freedom and Accord retorted by claiming that the CUP, in its previous attempt to amend the constitution, was covertly trying to "denounce" and abolish ritual fasting during the month of Ramadan and the five daily prayers.

=== Armenian politics ===
The CUP went to the polls in an electoral alliance with most Armenian political organizations, including the Armenian Revolutionary Federation. The Hunchaks deviated from the ARF, and formed an alliance with Freedom and Accord on 7 February 1912.

== Aftermath ==
The CUP won an overwhelming majority in parliament, winning all but 6 seats in parliament, which was largely attributed to voter intimidation and fraud. Therefore, this election was the first fraudulent election in Turkish history.

The manner of the CUP's victory led to the formation of the Savior Officers, a group aligned with the Freedom and Accord Party, whose aim was to restore constitutional government. After gaining support from the army in Macedonia, the officers demanded government reforms. Under pressure, the Grand Vizier Mehmed Said Pasha resigned. Sultan Mehmed V then appointed a new cabinet supported by the Officers and Freedom and Accord. On 5 August 1912, Mehmed V called for early elections. However, with the election underway in October, the outbreak of the Balkan Wars led to it being interrupted. Fresh elections were eventually held in 1914.

The CUP and ARF's alliance broke down when only 10 of its 23 candidates won their seats due to a lack of support.

== See also ==
- 4th Chamber of Deputies of the Ottoman Empire
