= 1914 Ottoman general election =

Elections

- January 1914

275 seats in the Chamber of Deputies
- Composition of the elected legislature after the election

General elections were held in the Ottoman Empire in the winter of 1913–1914. The Committee of Union and Progress (CUP) was the only party to contest the elections, and the newly elected Chamber of Deputies convened for the first time in May.

== Background ==
Following Ottoman military failures in the First Balkan War, Grand Vizier Kâmil Pasha was overthrown by a CUP-led coup in January 1913. Kâmil Pasha was hostile to the CUP, and had been determined to use his appointment to destroy the party.

After the coup the CUP was able to bring the cabinet under its control. Following the assassination of the new Grand Vizier Mahmud Shevket Pasha in June, the CUP was able to crush its political rival, the Freedom and Accord Party, whose supporters had been involved in the assassination, constructing a one-party-state. The Accordists were also weakened as the Empire lost territory in the Balkans, where many of its Christian supporters were based.

The CUP made efforts to win support in the Arab provinces by making conciliatory gestures to Arab leaders, which also weakened Arab support for the Entente and enabled the CUP to call elections with Unionists holding the upper hand.

== Conduct ==
With opposition to the CUP effectively banned the election was not a contest among parties but one of co-opting candidates into the party's lists.

Electoral fraud and coercion led to protests in several parts of the Empire. In the Hama Sanjak 27 of the 48 secondary voters signed a petition concerning the election in the Homs Sanjak. When Hama was due to vote, two-thirds of the voters refused to report to the polling station in protest at the conduct of the Homs election. Similar boycotts occurred in Acre due to irregularities in Safed and Tiberias.

== Results ==
Like 1908, the resultant parliament displayed a roughly proportional make up of the Empire's ethno-religious demographics as a result of negotiations with the Greek and Armenian communities. Many of those elected on CUP lists were independents, with a few even having Accordist sympathies.

== Aftermath ==
Parliament was on recess during the July Crisis and the events which lead the Ottoman Empire joining the Central Powers during World War I. During the war it was frequently on recess. Parliament essentially acted as a rubber stamp to the cabinet as it issued temporary laws, and real decisions were being decided in the CUP's Central Committee.

During World War I the Ottoman government retracted Mount Lebanon's autonomy and held by-elections.

In 1915 Armenian political organizations were banned, and most Armenian MPs were deported and then assassinated.

Elections were due in 1918 until a constitutional amendment was passed to extend a parliamentary term during an ongoing war requiring mass mobilization. On 1 April 1918 parliament passed a law extending its term for another year. After the Armistice of Mudros the CUP liquidated itself in a party congress, resulting in two new successor parties: the majority of MPs joined the Renewal Party the minority the Liberal People's Party. Sultan Mehmed VI, displeased with the parliament blocking his legislative agenda, pressured Grand Vizier Tevfik Pasha to dissolve the body. Both parties would be banned in 1919 for being successors to the CUP. New elections were delayed until Mustafa Kemal's nationalists pressured the government to hold them in the winter of 1919.

== See also ==
- 5th Chamber of Deputies of the Ottoman Empire
