= Court uniform and dress in the Ottoman Empire =

Overview of the court uniforms and dresses of the Ottoman Empire

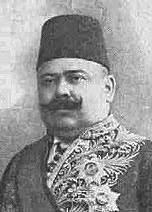
Halil Menteşe wearing the diplomatic uniform

The official court uniform and dress of the Ottoman Empire were required to be worn by those in attendance at the imperial court in the nineteenth century, with the aim of being on the same line as most European nations. It consisted of European-inspired clothing in the Empire style. It was introduced during the early stages of the Tanzimat modernization period until the end of the First World War.

== History ==
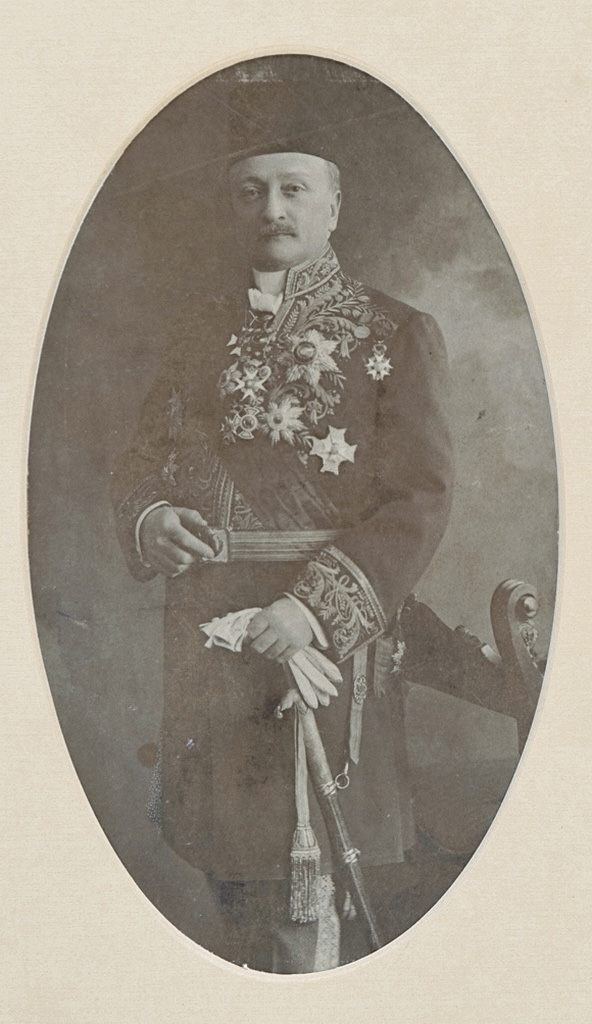
Ismail Cenani Pasha in court dress (1911)

The Tanzimat reforms emerged from the minds of reformist sultans like Mahmud II, his son Abdulmejid I and prominent, often European-educated bureaucrats, who recognised that the old religious and military institutions no longer met the needs of the empire. Most of the symbolic changes, such as uniforms, were aimed at changing the mindset of imperial administrators. Many of the officials affiliated with the government were encouraged to wear a more western style of dress. Many of the reforms were attempts to adopt successful European practices. The reforms were heavily influenced by the Napoleonic Code and French law under the Second French Empire as a direct result of the increasing number of Ottoman students being educated in France.

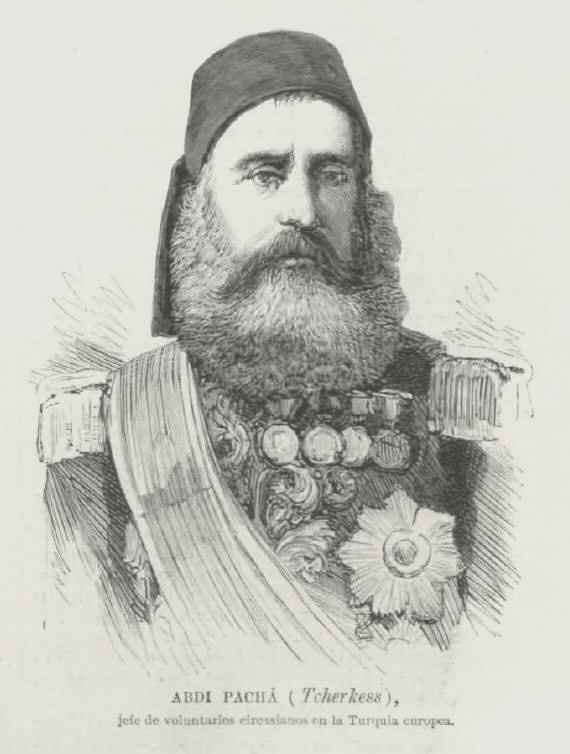
Cerkez Abdi Pasha in court dress (1875)

After the French military mission in 1796, French practices became very popular within Ottoman society. After the creation of the first cabinet, Mahmud II ordered several bureaucrats to the courts of France and other nations around the globe to observe not only clothing but also innovated institutions, which were acceptable for that era. The first new court uniforms were worn around 1839, the time of the sultan's death. His son Abdulmejid I succeeded him and French-style court uniform and dress were officially set. European-style clothing was also popular among the upper class, as redingotes, jackets, waistcoats, frock coats, ties, sharp-pointed and high-heeled shoes were not unusual during the Tanzimat modernization period.

=== Republican period ===
After the abolition of the Ottoman monarchy, the white tie was introduced for all government officials including the president.

== Gallery ==
=== Court uniforms 1839-1876 ===
French-inspired court dresses (Note the white gloves, epaulettes, trousers and collars)

Another example of French-inspired court dresses, mainly based on uniforms which were being used in the Second French Empire

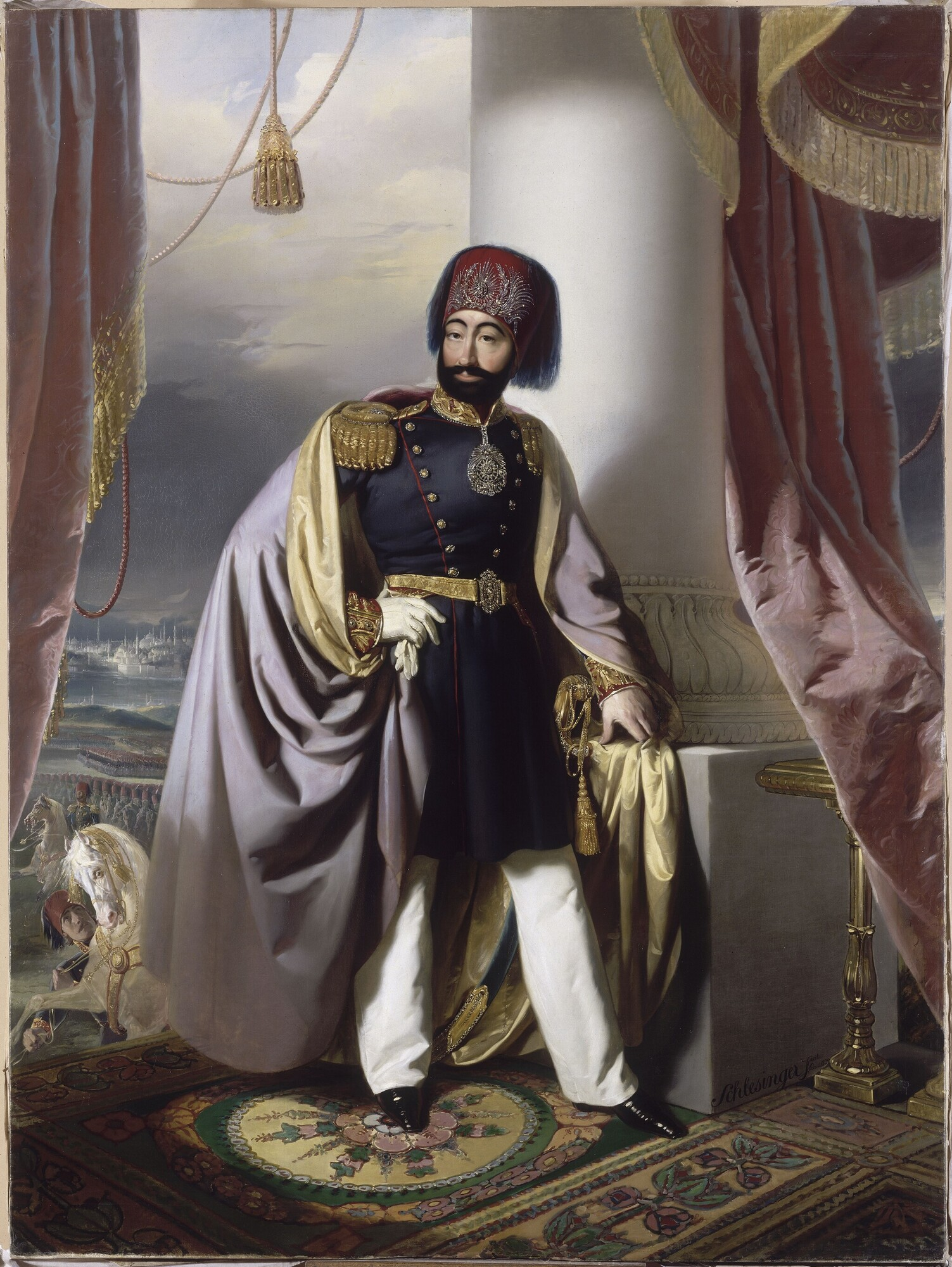
A painting of Mahmud II appearing in European clothes along with a cloak

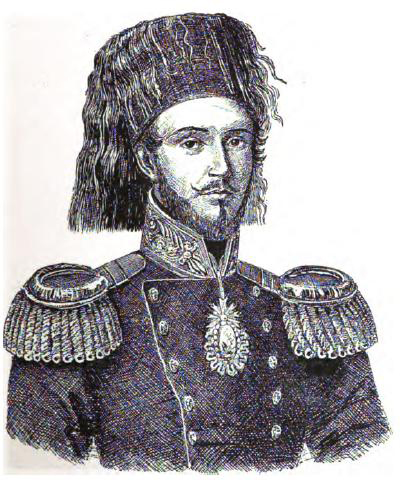
Sultan Abdulmejid I in clothes based on the French model

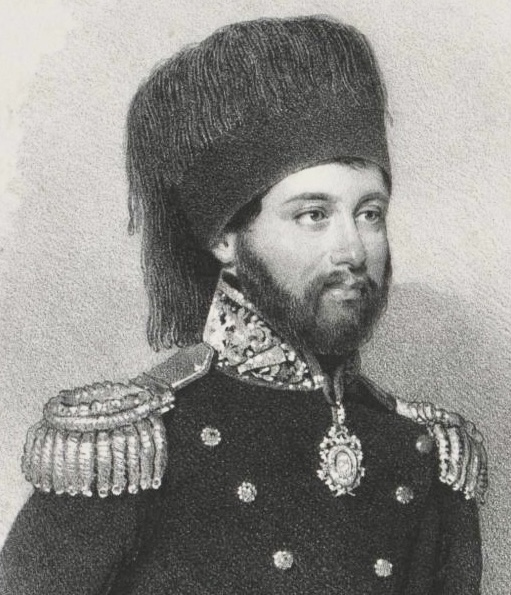
Damat Gürcü Halil Rifat Pasha, statesman

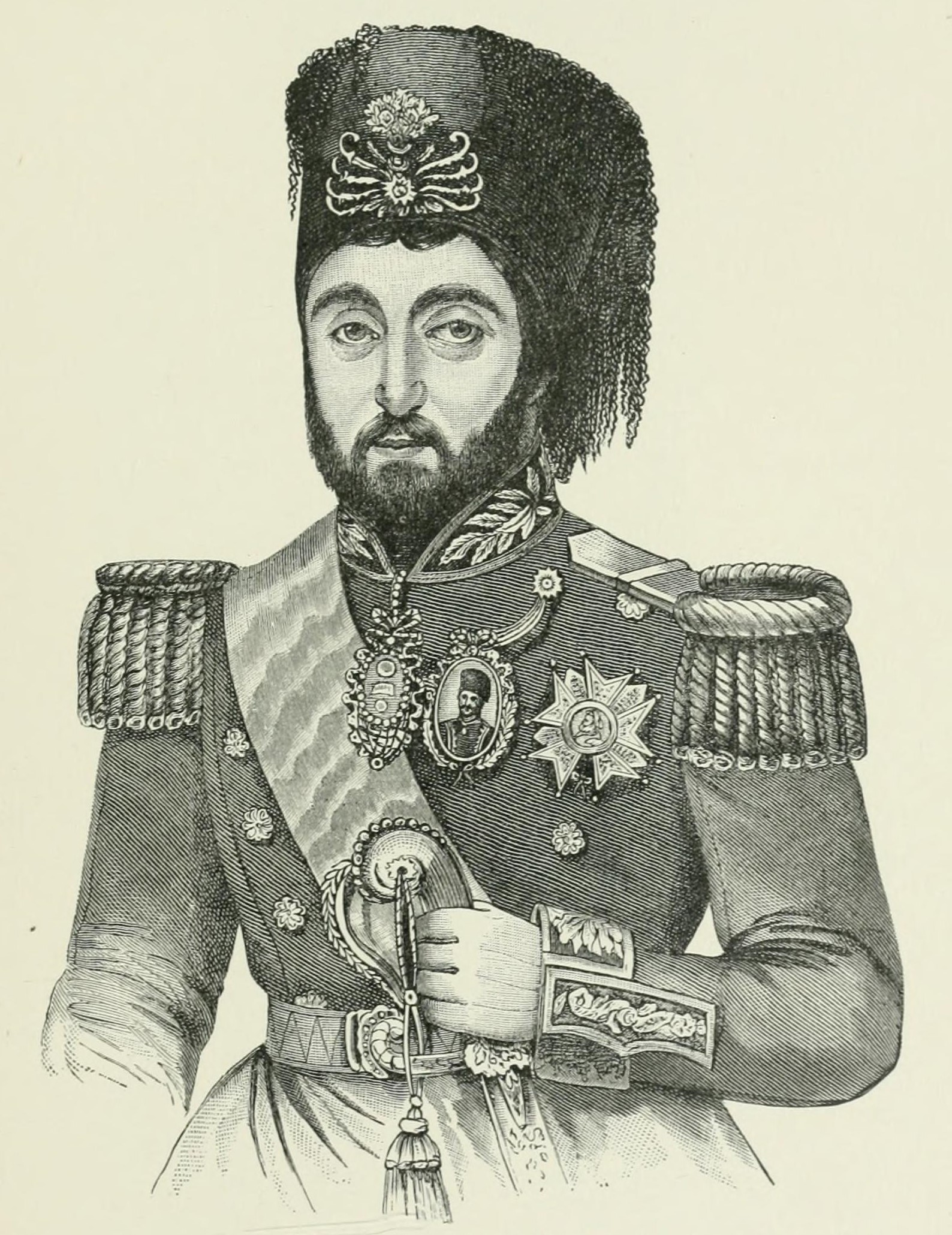
Mustafa Reshid Pasha, the chief architect behind the Tanzimat reforms

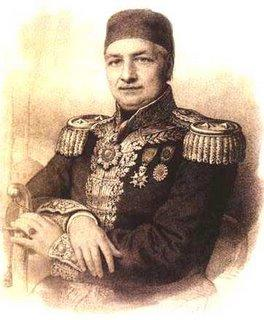
Giuseppe Donizetti Pasha

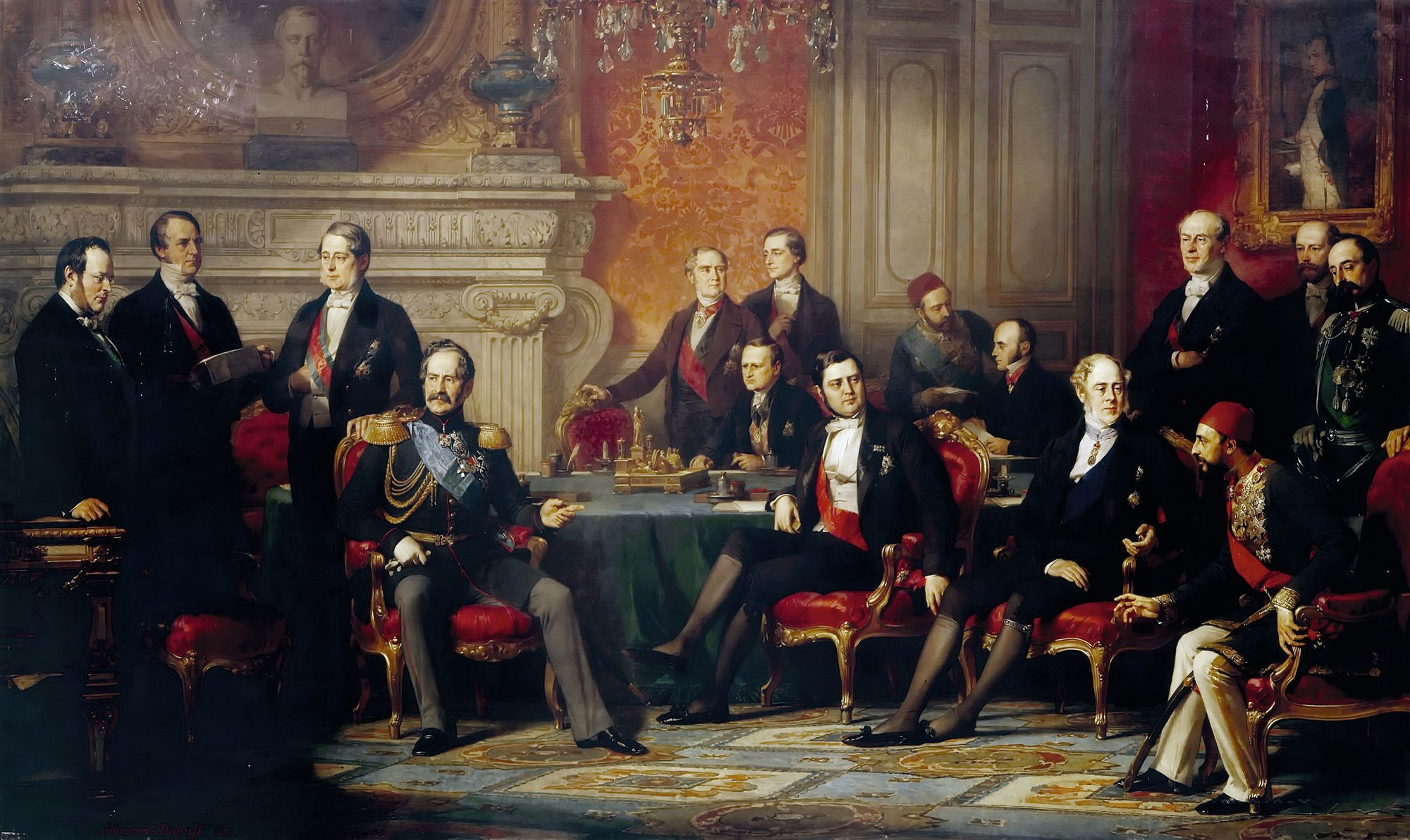
Mehmed Emin Âli Pasha (on the far right) wearing the diplomatic uniform

=== Court uniforms 1876-1922 ===
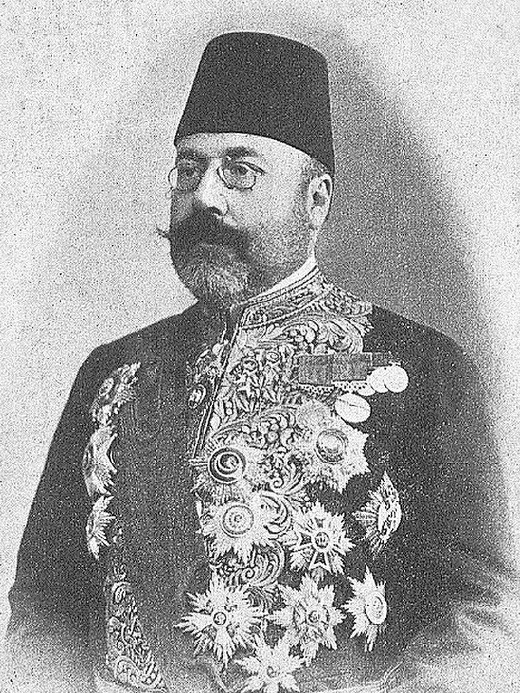
Ibrahim Hakki Pasha

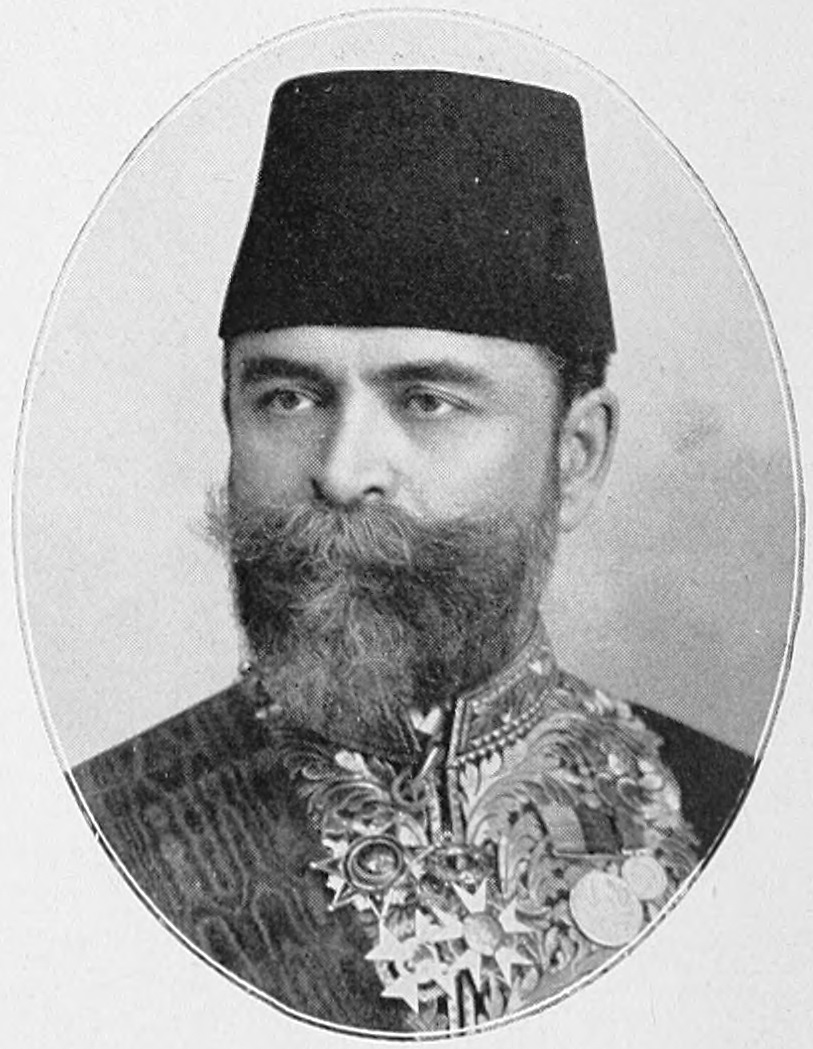
Damat Ferid Pasha

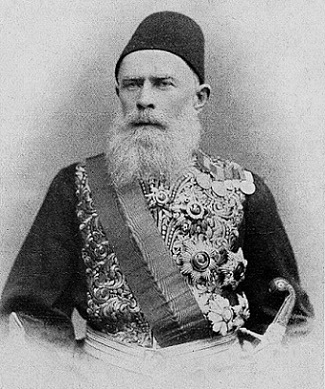
Ahmed Cevdet Pasha

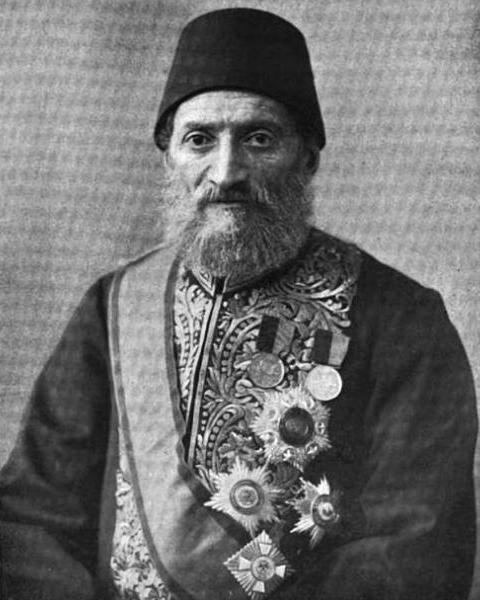
Kâmil Pasha

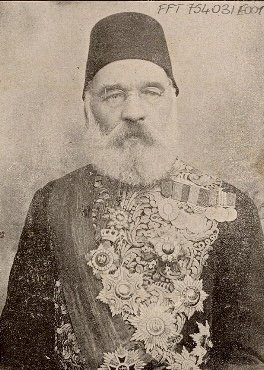
Halil Rifat Pasha

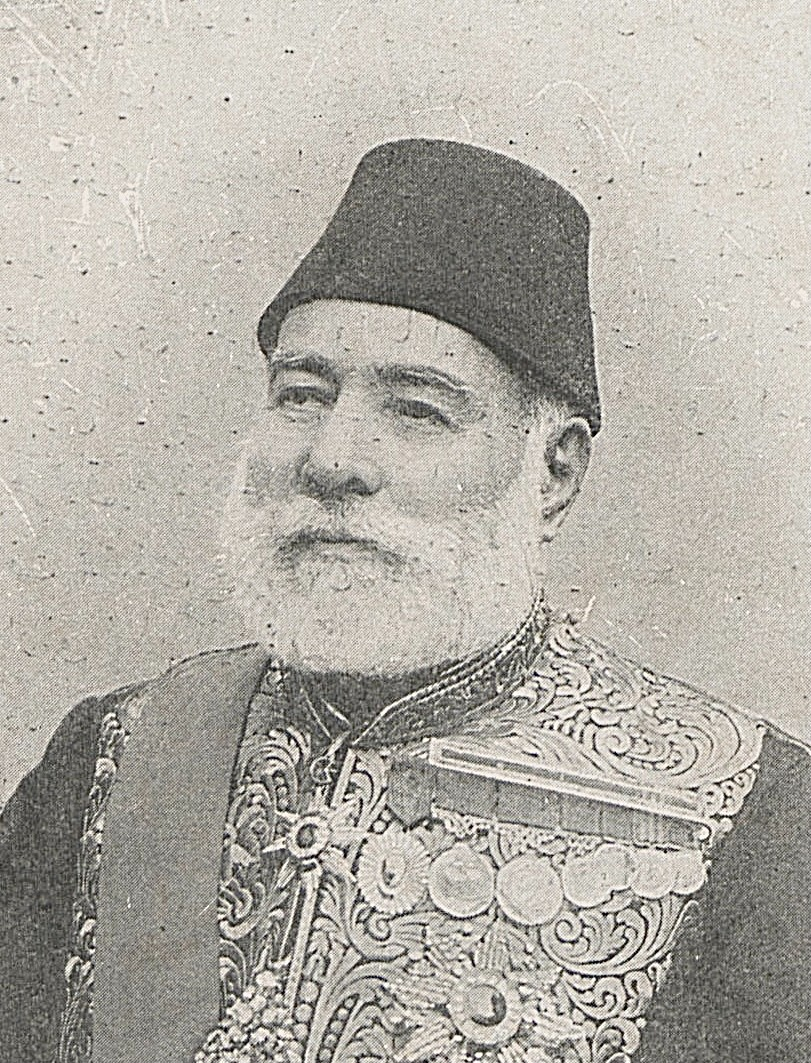
Abdurrahman Nurettin Pasha

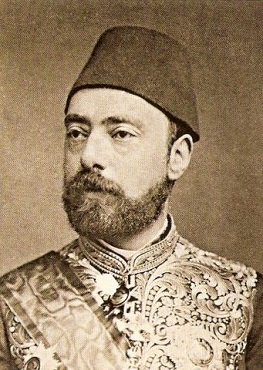
Sadullah Pasha

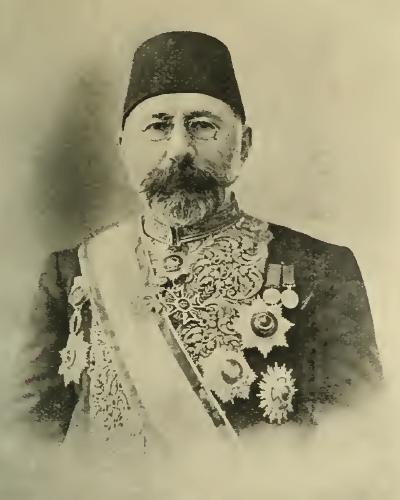
Abdurrahman Şeref Bey

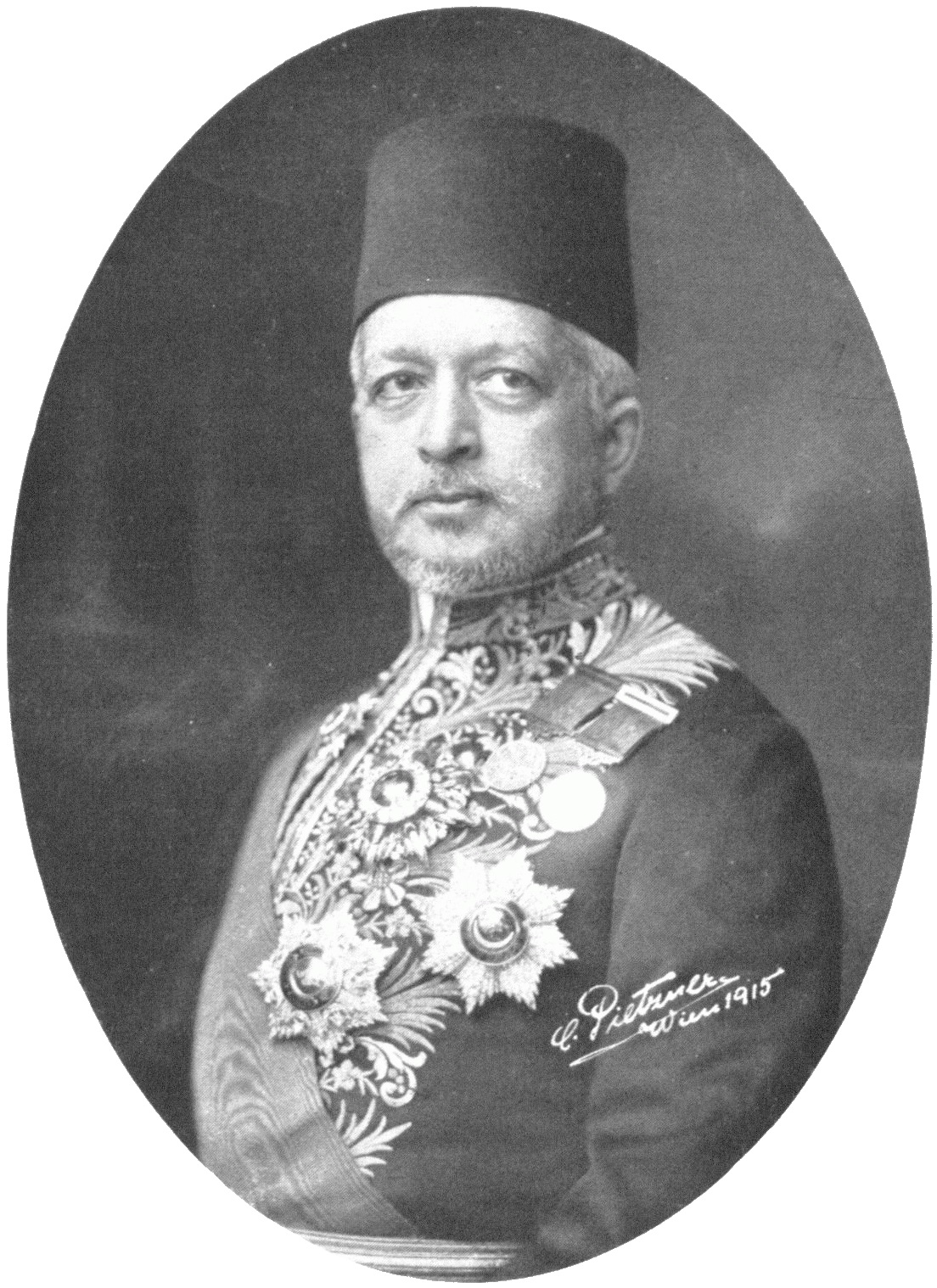
Said Halim Pasha

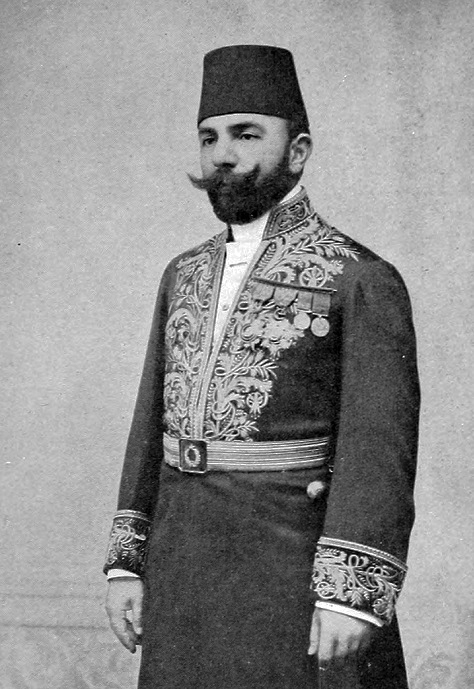
Djemal Pasha

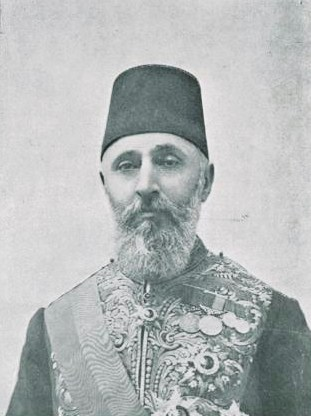
Ahmet Tevfik Pasha

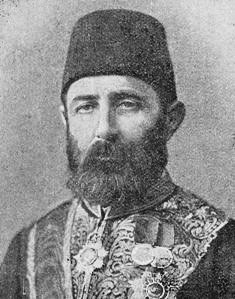
Hasan Fehmi Pasha

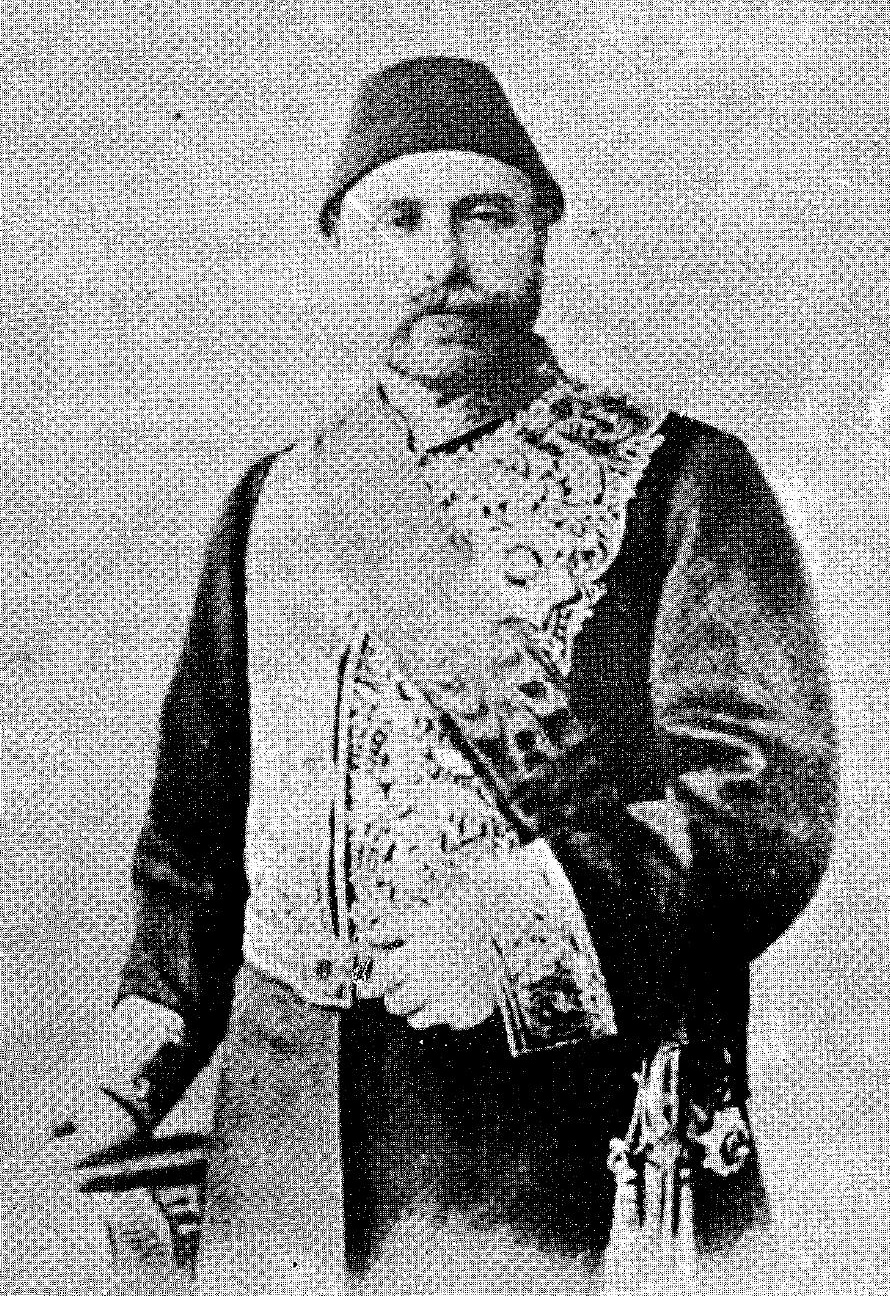
Mehmed Kadri Pasha

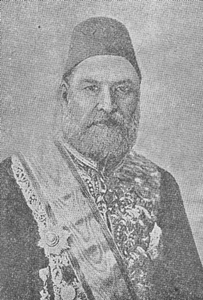
Agah Efendi

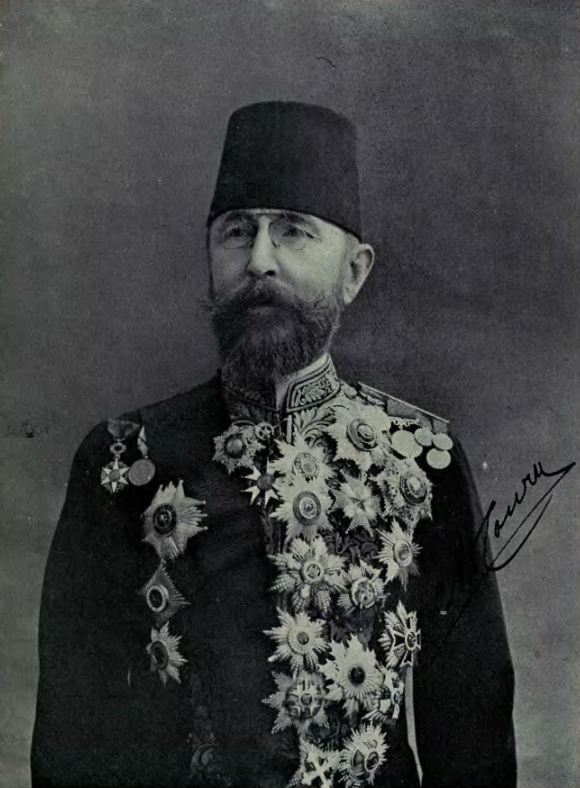
Nuri Pasha

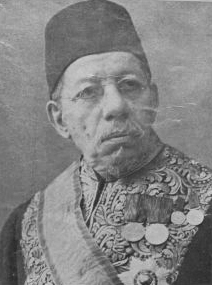
Mehmed Raif Pasha

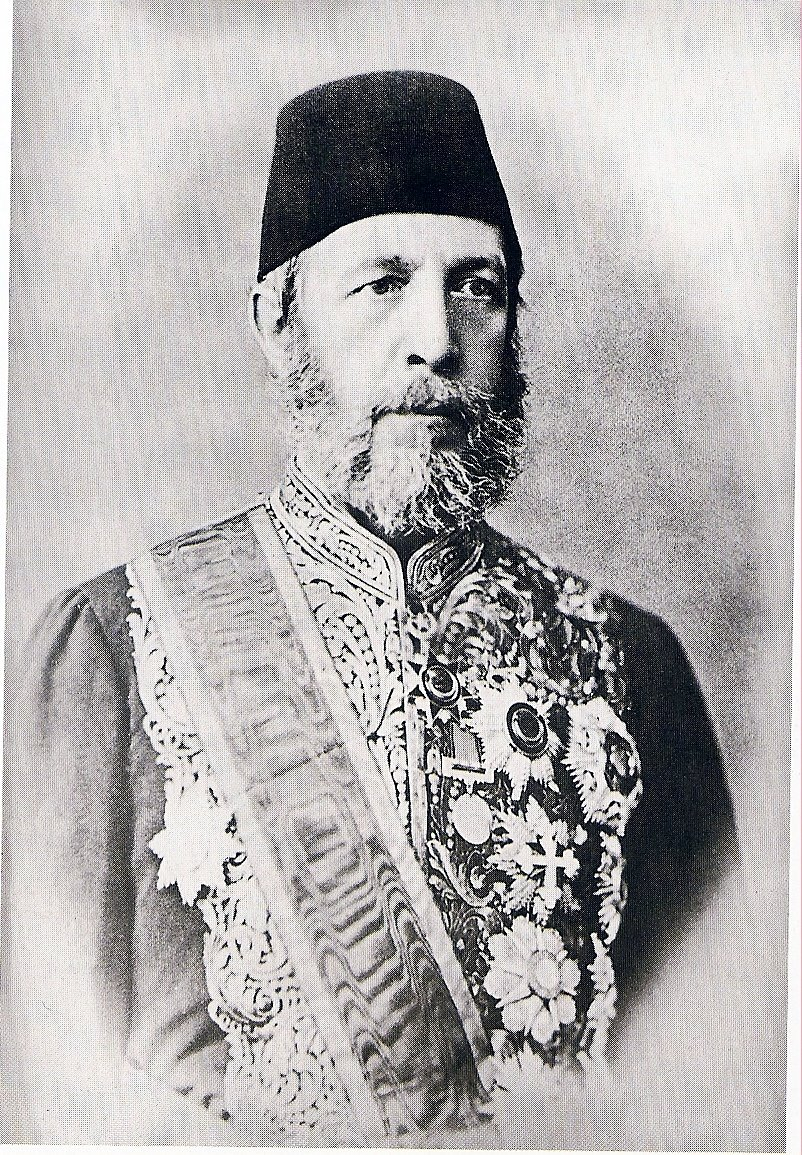
Alexander Karatheodori Pasha

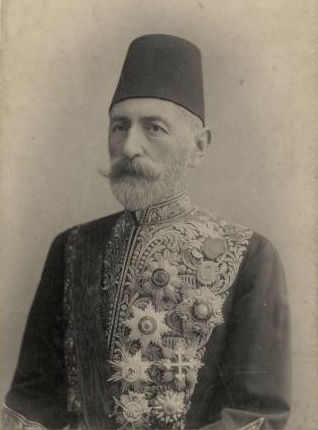
Turhan Pasha Përmeti
