= Ministry of the Interior (Ottoman Empire) =

Imperial ministry of the Ottoman Empire

Ministry of Interior Affairs
- Ottoman Turkish: امورِ داخلیه نظارتی; Umur-ı Dâhiliye Nezâreti
- Logo of the Interior Ministry

Agency overview
- Formed: 1860
- Preceding agency: Kethüda
- Dissolved: 4 November, 1922
- Superseding agency: Ministry of Interior Affairs of the Republic of Turkey (2 May 1920)
- Jurisdiction: Ottoman Empire
- Headquarters: Constantinople
- Minister responsible: Mehmed Talaat Pasha (1909–1918)

The Ministry of the Interior (Ottoman Turkish: داخلیه نظارتی; Turkish: Dâhiliye nezareti) was from 1860 the interior ministry of the Ottoman Empire, based in Constantinople (now Istanbul).

== History ==
Previously the Grand Vizier, upon the counsel of his advisor, managed the internal affairs of the state, but in 1860 a Western-style ministry of the interior was established as part of a reform of the empire's administration. In 1839 an interior ministry detached from the Lieutenant of the Grand Vizier, or the sadaret kethüdası, but was consolidated back into the Grand Vezierate's office two years later. Interior matters were handled by the undersecretary [sadaret müsteşarı]. After Fuad Pasha's death, Âli Pasha separated the offices again on 18 February, 1869.

== Functions ==
The Ministry of the Interior held the responsibility for central administration of all internal matters of the empire. It received communiques and proposals from the provinces, from which some would be sent to legislative organs or the sultan. New laws which came from an İrade, or a sultan's pronouncement of approval, would be executed by the ministry. In its portfolio were all operations and personnel associated with security, police forces, local administrations, and the control over all bureaucrats outside the central government.

During the Tanzimat era the Ministry of the Interior maintained three inspectorates: Rumeli, Anatolia, and the Arab world. Commissions were maintained to maintain health and sanitation, and of the affairs of the Holy Cities.

== Organization ==
According to the Corps de droit ottoman, the ministry included:

- Census Bureau [Sidjili-Noufouz-Idaressi, Bureau de recensement]
- Bureau of Emigrants [Mouhadjir Idaressi, Bureau des émigrés]
- Passport Bureau [Bureau des Passeports]
- Pension Fund Directorate [Takaud sandighi Nazaréti, Direction de la caisse de retraites]
- Directorate of Internal Press [Matbouat Midiréti, Direction de la Presse Intérieure]
- Commission for the Selection of Employees [Intihab méémorin Commissionou, Commission pour le choix de employés]
- Department of Service Staff [Sidjili-ahwal-Idaressi, Direction des états de service des fonctionnaires]

Circa 1905 the budget of the ministry was 495,300 Ottoman lira out of 954,364 for the government.

Other departments included:

- Office for the Settlement of Tribes and Immigrants [İskân-i Aşâyirîn ve Muhâcirin Müdîriyeti: İAMM]
- Department of Public Security and Dispatches
- Cipher Office
- Directorate of General Security [Emniyet Umum Müdürlüğü: EUM]

=== Ottoman Refugee Commission ===
After the Young Turk Revolution, the Ottoman government abolished the Refugee Commission, then known as the Commission for Muslim Refugees [Muhacirin-i İslamiye Komisyonu], transferring its powers over to the Interior Ministry. During the First Balkan War the commission was reincarnated as the Directorate for the Settlement of Tribes and Refugees [İskan-ı Aşair ve Muhacirin Müdüriyeti, 1913–1916], and then the General Directorate for Tribes and Refugees [Aşair ve Muhacirin Müdüriyet-i Umumiyesi, 1916–1922]. The office played an important role in the Armenian genocide.

== Successor ==
The Ministry of the Interior currently governs domestic affairs in Turkey.

== List of interior ministers ==
- Pertev Pasha (1835-1837)
- Akif Pasha (1837-1838)
- Mehmed Emin Rauf Pasha (1838-1839)
- Şirvanlızade Mehmed Rüşdi Pasha (1869-1871)
- Kabzımalzade Mehmed Said Efendi (1871-1877)
- Ahmed Cevdet Pasha (5 February 1877)
- Ahmed Hamdi Pasha (November 1877-January 1878)
- Kabzımalzade Mehmed Said Efendi (1878)
- Ahmed Vefik Pasha (1878)
- Mehmed Sadık Pasha (1878)
- Mehmed Said Pasha (9 June 1878 - 23 November 1878)
- Mahmud Server Pasha (23 November 1878-1879)
- Cenanizade Mehmed Kadri Pasha (1879)
- Mahmud Nedim Pasha (1879-1882)
- İbrahim Edhem Pasha (1882-1885)
- Ahmed Münir Pasha (1885-1891)
- Halil Rifat Pasha (1891-1896)
- Mehmed Memduh Pasha (1896-1907)
- Akif Halil Pasha (1908)
- Reşid Akif Pasha (1908)
- İbrahim Hakkı Pasha (1908)
- Hüseyin Hilmi Pasha (1908-1909)
- Avlonyalı Mehmed Ferid Pasha (1909)
- Adil Bey (1909)
- Mehmed Talat Pasha (1909-1911)
- Halil Bey (Menteşe) (1911)
- Mehmed Celal Bey (1911-1912)
- Hacı Mehmed Adil Bey (Arda) (1912)
- Mehmed Ziya Pasha (1912)
- Ali Daniş Bey (1912)
- Avlonyalı Mehmed Ferid Pasha (1912)
- Ahmet Reşit Bey (Rey) (1912-1913)
- Hacı Adil Bey (Arda) (1913)
- Mehmed Talat Pasha (1913-1918)
- Mustafa Arif Bey (Deymer) (1918)
- Ali Fethi Bey (Okyar) (1918)
- İsmail Hakkı Canbulat Bey (1918)
- Mustafa Arif Bey (Deymer) (1918-1919)
- Kurd Ahmed İzzet Pasha (1919)
- Artin Cemal Bey (Keşmir) (1919)
- Ahmed Reşit Bey (Rey) (1919)
- Mehmed Ali Bey (Gerede) (1919)
- Ali Kemal Bey (1919)
- Adil Bey (1919)
- Mehmed Şerif Pasha Çavdaroğlu (1919-1920)
- Ebubekir Hazım Bey (1920)
- Reşid Mümtaz Pasha (1920)
- Kurd Ahmed İzzet Pasha (1920-1921)
- Mustafa Arif Bey (Deymer) (1921)
- Şerif Mehmed Rauf Pasha (1921)
- Ali Rıza Pasha (1921-1922)
- Salih Hulusi Pasha (1922)
