= Aidin vilayet =

First-level administrative division of the Ottoman Empire

ولايت ايدين (Ottoman Turkish) Vilâyet-i Aidin
- Vilayet of the Ottoman Empire
- 1867–1919
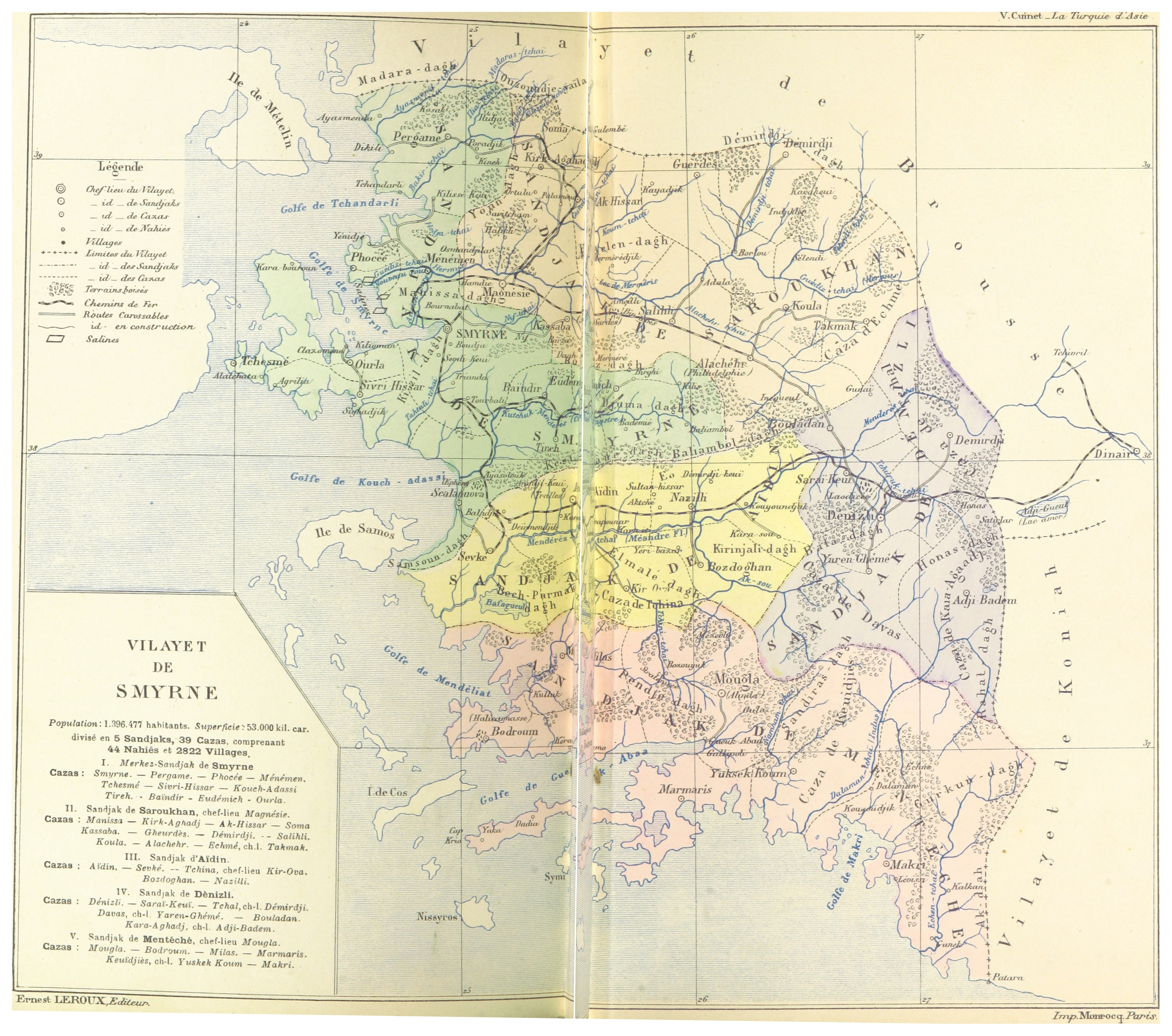
- The Aidin Vilayet in 1894
- Capital: Smyrna (İzmir)
- Area
  - Coordinates: 38.06°N 28.25°E
- History
  - Vilayet Law: 1867
  - Greek occupation: 1919
Preceded by	Succeeded by
Aidin Eyalet	Zone of Smyrna
- Today part of: Turkey

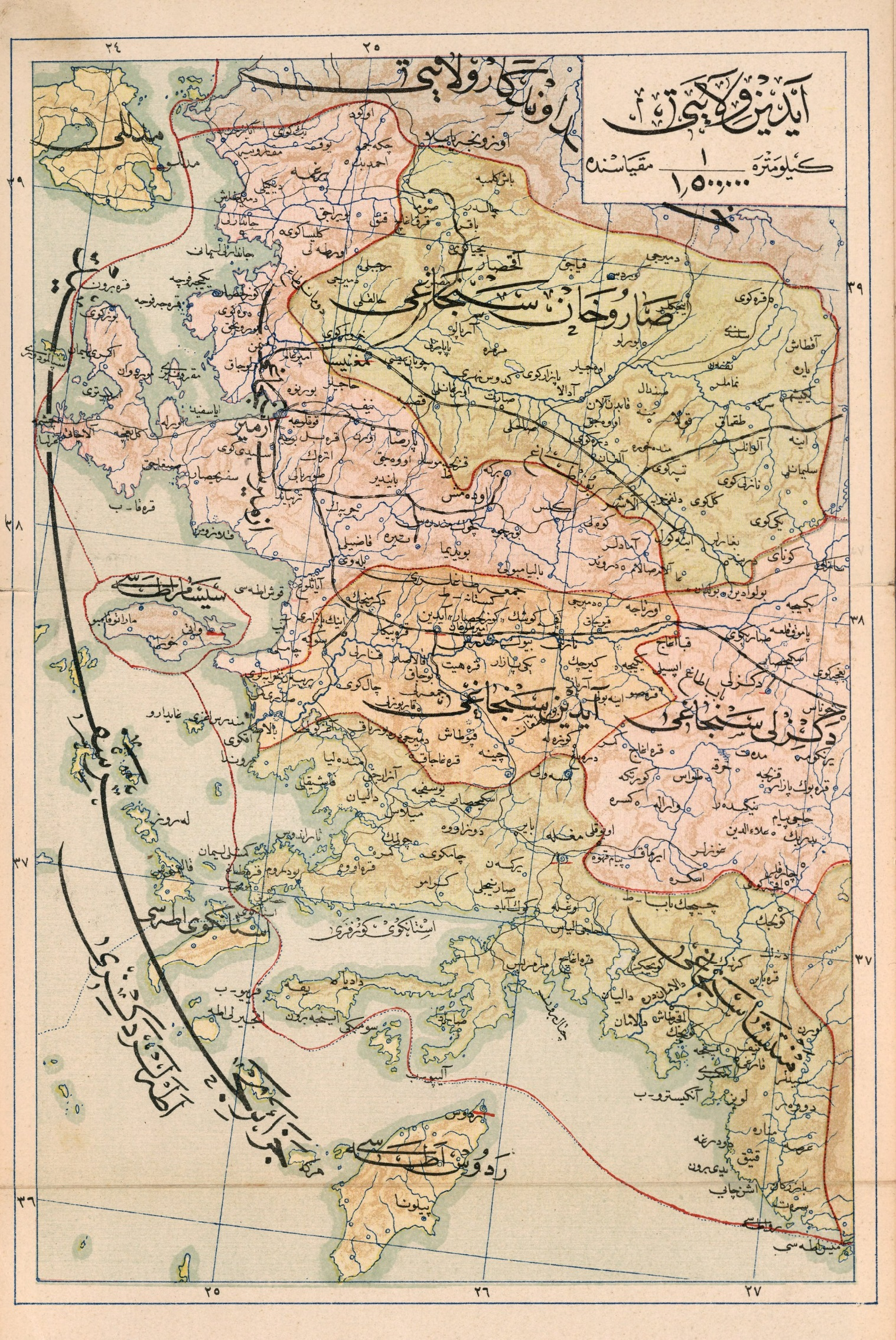
Map of subdivisions of Aidin Vilayet in 1907

The Vilayet of Aidin or Aydin (Ottoman Turkish: ولايت ايدين, romanized: Vilâyet-i Aidin, French: vilayet d'Aïdin) also known as Vilayet of Smyrna or İzmir after its administrative centre, was a first-level administrative division (vilayet) of the Ottoman Empire in the south-west of Asia Minor, including the ancient regions of Lydia, Ionia, Caria and western Lycia. It was described by the 1911 Encyclopædia Britannica as the "richest and most productive province of Asiatic Turkey".

At the beginning of the 20th century, Aidin Vilayet reportedly had an area of 17,370 square miles (45,000 km^{2}), while the preliminary results of the first Ottoman census of 1885 (published in 1908) gave the population as 1,390,783. The stated accuracy of the population figures ranges from "approximate" to "merely conjectural" depending on the region from which they were gathered. As of 1920, the vilayet had an "exceptionally large" Christian population.

== Economy ==
The British described Aidin Vilayet as having a "remarkable variety of agriculture", as of 1920. They produced grains and cotton, specifically in Aydın and Nazilli. The region also produced opium, tobacco, and valonia oak. Fruit was one of the most popular exports, with figs and grapes being popular. Before World War I, fig production was up, with an expansive increase in production and exportation via railway. Grapes were used to produce raisins and licorice was also produced in the region. It was noted as growing wild along the Büyük Menderes River. It was exported to the United States and United Kingdom.

Aidin, as of 1920, was considered to be the world's supply center for emery, specifically in the areas between Tire and Söke. In the early 20th century, Aidin was also noted for large deposits of chromium, specifically near Mount Olympus and in the southwestern region of the vilayet. Antimony and mercury were also found in the area.

Carpet was manufactured in Vilayet, mainly in Smyrna, but with carpet being made throughout the region, including in Kula, Uşak, Gördes and Isparta. After World War I, sales declined, however, Britain remained a major importer of Turkish carpets from Aidin. Carpets were mainly produced by women.

== Environment ==
As of 1920, the region was noted as having 6,000 square kilometers of forest. The west and southwest had the most thickly forested areas. The British described Makri as being "rich in excellent timber." Cedars were found in Makri, with oak and pine throughout the vilayet. In the early 20th-century, deforestation had begun via private companies of the vilayet. Sawmills had been erected, with Makri having its own steam-run sawmill. Most trees were felled by hand at this time. Tavas also had a timber economy during this period.

== 1881 Census ==
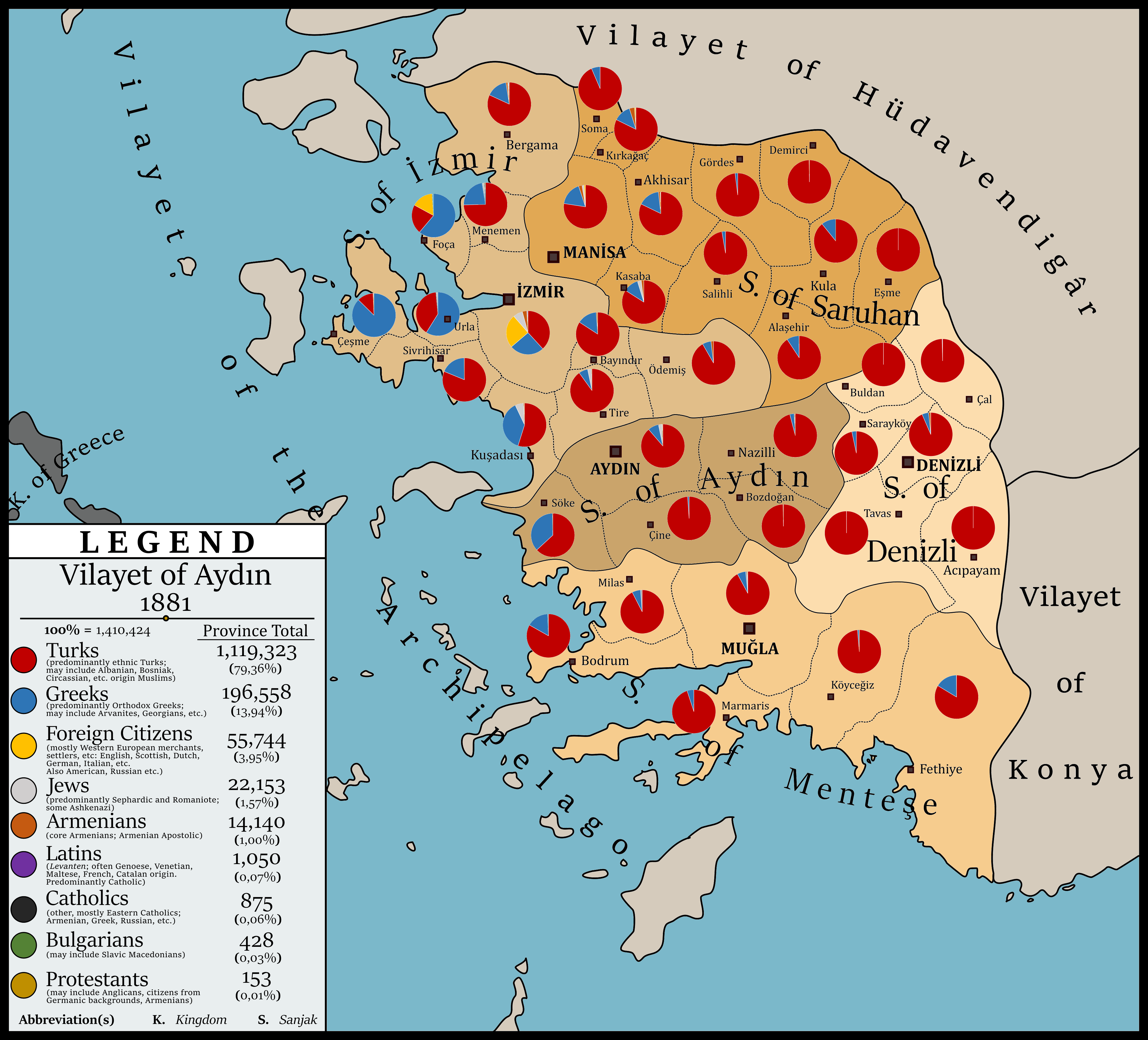

== Governors ==
- Mehmed Sabri Pasha (1867-1868)
- Hekim Ismail Pasha (1868-1869)
- Veliüddin Pasha (1869-1870)
- Mehmed Sadik Pasha (1870-1872)
- Hussein Avni Pasha (1872-1872)
- Mustafa Sureyya Pasha (1872-1873)
- Hamdi Pasha (1873-1874)
- Ahmed Rasim Pasha (1874-1875)
- Ahmed Pasha (1875-1875)
- Ahmed Esad Pasha (1875-1875)
- Hurshit Pasha (1875-1876)
- Sabri Pasha (1876-1880)
- Midhat Pasha (1880-1881)
- Ali Pasha (1881-1882)
- Kâmil Pasha (1883-1883)
- Nashit Pasha (1883-1885)
- Halil Rifat Pasha (1885-1886)
- Nafiz Pasha (1886-1889)
- Halil Rifat Pasha (1889-1891)
- Abdurrahman Nureddin Pasha (1891-1893)
- Hasan Fehmi Pasha (1893-1895)
- Kâmil Pasha (1895-1907)
- Faik Bey (1907-1908)
- Sherif Mehmed Rauf Pasha (1908-1909)
- Ali Galib Bey (1909-1909)
- Mehmed Ferid Pasha (1909-1909)
- Kiazim Pasha (1909-1909)
- Mahmud Muhtar Pasha (1909-1910)
- Hussein Nazim Pasha (1910-1911)
- Celâl Bey (1911-1912)
- Ahmed Reshid Rey (1912-1912)
- Hussein Nazim Pasha (1913-1913)
- Rahmi Arslan (1913-1917)
- Hasan Tahsin Uzer (1918-1918)
- Edhem Bey (1918-1919)
- Nureddin Pasha (1919-1919)
- Kambur Izzeddin (1919-1919)

== Administrative divisions ==
Before 1914, the vilayet was subdivided into:

1. Smyrna Sanjak, subdivided into the kazas of Smyrna (İzmir, seat of the Vali), Nif, Karaburun, Kuşadası, Çeşme, Ödemiş, Urla, Foça, Bayındır, Menemen, Bergama, Seferihisar and Tire.
2. Sarukhan Sanjak, subdivided into the kazas of Manisa, Alaşehir, Kula, Akhisar, Salihli, Gördes, Demirci, Eşme, Kırkağaç, Soma and Kasaba (Turgutlu).
3. Aidin Sanjak, subdivided into the kazas of Aydın, Nazilli, Bozdoğan, Söke and Çine.
4. Menteshe Sanjak, subdivided into the kazas of Muğla, Milas, Meğri, Bodrum, Köyceğiz and Marmaris.
5. Denizli Sanjak, subdivided into the kazas of Denizli, Tavas, Çal, Buldan, Sarayköy and Garbikaraağaç (Acıpayam).

== Demographics ==
In 1893, there were in total 39 Kaza (districts). According to the Ottoman census of that year, in the 35 kazas Muslims were the majority. In the kaza of Izmir there was no majority but Muslims were the largest group. In the kaza of Foça, Urla and Çesme, comprising the Karaburun Peninsula, Greeks were the majority. However, according to American pre-Greco-Turkish War (1919-1922) estimates, the Greek element was the most numerous in Smyrna Sanjak with 375,000 inhabitants, while other groups included Muslims (325,000), Jews (40,000) and Armenians (18,000).
