= Hüseyin Hilmi Pasha =

Ottoman statesman and imperial administrator (1855–1922)

Hussein Hilmi Pasha
- حسین حلمی
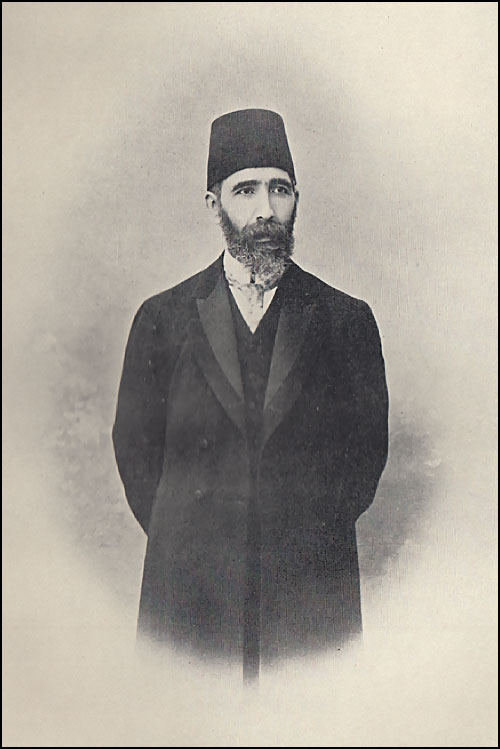
- Hüseyin Hilmi Pasha as Ottoman Inspector General of Macedonia, photograph taken between 1903 and 1908.

Grand Vizier of the Ottoman Empire
- In office 14 February 1909 – 13 April 1909
- Monarch: Abdul Hamid II
- Preceded by: Kâmil Pasha
- Succeeded by: Ahmet Tevfik Pasha
- In office 5 May 1909 – 12 January 1910
- Monarch: Mehmed V
- Preceded by: Ahmet Tevfik Pasha
- Succeeded by: Ibrahim Hakki Pasha

Minister of the Interior
- In office 1908–1909

Inspectorate-General of Macedonia
- In office 1902–1908

Ambassador to Austria-Hungary
- In office 1912–1918

Personal details
- Born: 1 April 1855 Midilli, Eyalet of the Archipelago, Ottoman Empire
- Died: 1922 (aged 66–67) Vienna, Austria

Hüseyin Hilmi Pasha (Ottoman Turkish: حسین حلمی پاشا Turkish: Hüseyin Hilmi Paşa, also spelled Hussein Hilmi Pasha) (1 April 1855 – 1922) was an Ottoman statesman and imperial administrator. He was twice the Grand Vizier of the Ottoman Empire around the time of the Second Constitutional Era. He was also one-time president of the Turkish Red Crescent, the Turkish affiliate of the International Red Cross and Red Crescent Movement.

Hüseyin Hilmi was one of the most successful Ottoman administrators in the explosive Balkans of the early 20th century, becoming the Ottoman Inspectorate-General of Macedonia from 1902 to 1908, Minister of the Interior from 1908 to 1909, and ambassador to Austria-Hungary from 1912 to 1918. He is often regarded, along with Ahmet Rıza Bey and Hasan Fehmi Pasha, as one of the leading statesmen who encouraged and propagated further progressivism.

== Biography ==
Hüseyin Hilmi was born to a Turkish family in September 1855 in Lesbos, in the district of Sarlıca. He was the son of Kütahyalızade Tüccar Mustafa Efendi, who was from a family of merchants originating from Kütahya and have settled in the island when Hüseyin Hilmi's grandfather made the move into the island. He was of partial Greek ancestry, an ancestor had converted to Islam. He did his primary, secondary, and madrasa studies in Lesbos and learned fluent French at an early age. He met Namık Kemal, then exiled in Lesbos, at an early age, who advocated for young Hilmi whenever he had the means to. This relationship affected Hilmi's political ideology later in life. In 1875, he worked as a clerk in the Lesbos Registry Office.

He started out as a clerk in the Ottoman state structure and gradually climbed the ladder of the hierarchy, becoming the governor of Adana in 1897 and of Yemen in 1902. That same year in 1902, he was appointed Inspectorate-General of Rumelia (Rumeli Umûmî Müfettişliği) with responsibility over virtually all of the Balkan territories of the Ottoman Empire at the time, namely the vilayets of Salonica, Kosovo and Manastir.

By all accounts: foreigners, the Sultan, and the Young Turks, he was a competent inspector, and helped pass important reforms in the area. He either turned a blind eye, or had a relationship with the Committee of Union and Progress. He joined the Freemasonry lodge Obedience of Véritas. The Young Turk Revolution happened under his watch, and the CUP awarded in him their trust post-revolution.

After the 1908 revolution, he was appointed as Minister of the Interior in the third Kâmil Pasha cabinet, and then served as Grand Vizier, at first between February 14, 1909, and April 13, 1909, under Abdul Hamid II and then, reassuming the post from Ahmed Tevfik Pasha a month later, between May 5, 1909, and December 28, 1909. As such, in his first vizierate, he was the last grand vizier of Abdul Hamid II. His first term was suddenly interrupted because of the 31 March Incident (which actually occurred on April 13), when for a few days, reactionary absolutists and Islamic fundamentalists took back control of the Ottoman government in Constantinople until the arrival of an army from Selanik that suppressed the attempted countercoup. Hilmi Pasha resigned 12 January 1910 due to the invasiveness of the Committee of Union and Progress on his administration.

After his second term as grand vizier under Mehmed V, Hüseyin Hilmi Pasha served as the Minister of Justice in the succeeding Ahmed Muhtar Pasha cabinet. Along with Muhtar, he played a key role in shuttering the CUP–dominated parliament during the 1912 coup d'état. In October 1912, he was sent to Vienna as the Ottoman ambassador to Austria-Hungary, a position he held until the end of World War I. Due to health problems, he remained in Vienna until his death in 1922. He was buried in Beşiktaş, Istanbul.

== Family ==
He married Fatma Zehra Hanım, with whom he had six children, Ayşe Aliye, Osman Şevket, Ömer Adil, Namık Hilmi, Kemal Hilmi, and Ali Hilmi. Ömer and Osman succumbed of the Spanish flu. The family adopted the surname "Sarlıca". Ayşe Aliye Sarlıca's daughter, and Hüseyin Hilmi's granddaughter, is the composer Nazife Güran.

During the couples' stay in Vienna during World War I, Zehra raised money to treat Turkish soldiers wounded on the Galician Front.

== See also ==
- List of Ottoman grand viziers
- Greek Muslims

Political offices
Preceded by	Minister of the Interior; 1908–1909	Succeeded by
Preceded by Mehmed Said Pasha	Grand Vizier of the Ottoman Empire; 14 February 1909 – 13 April 1909	Succeeded by Ahmed Tevfik Pasha
Preceded by Ahmed Tevfik Pasha	Grand Vizier of the Ottoman Empire; 5 May 1909 – 12 January 1910	Succeeded by Ibrahim Hakkı Pasha
Diplomatic posts
Preceded by	Ambassador to Austria-Hungary; 1912–1918	Succeeded by
