= Abdurrahman Pasha High School =

High school in Kastamonu, Turkey

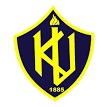

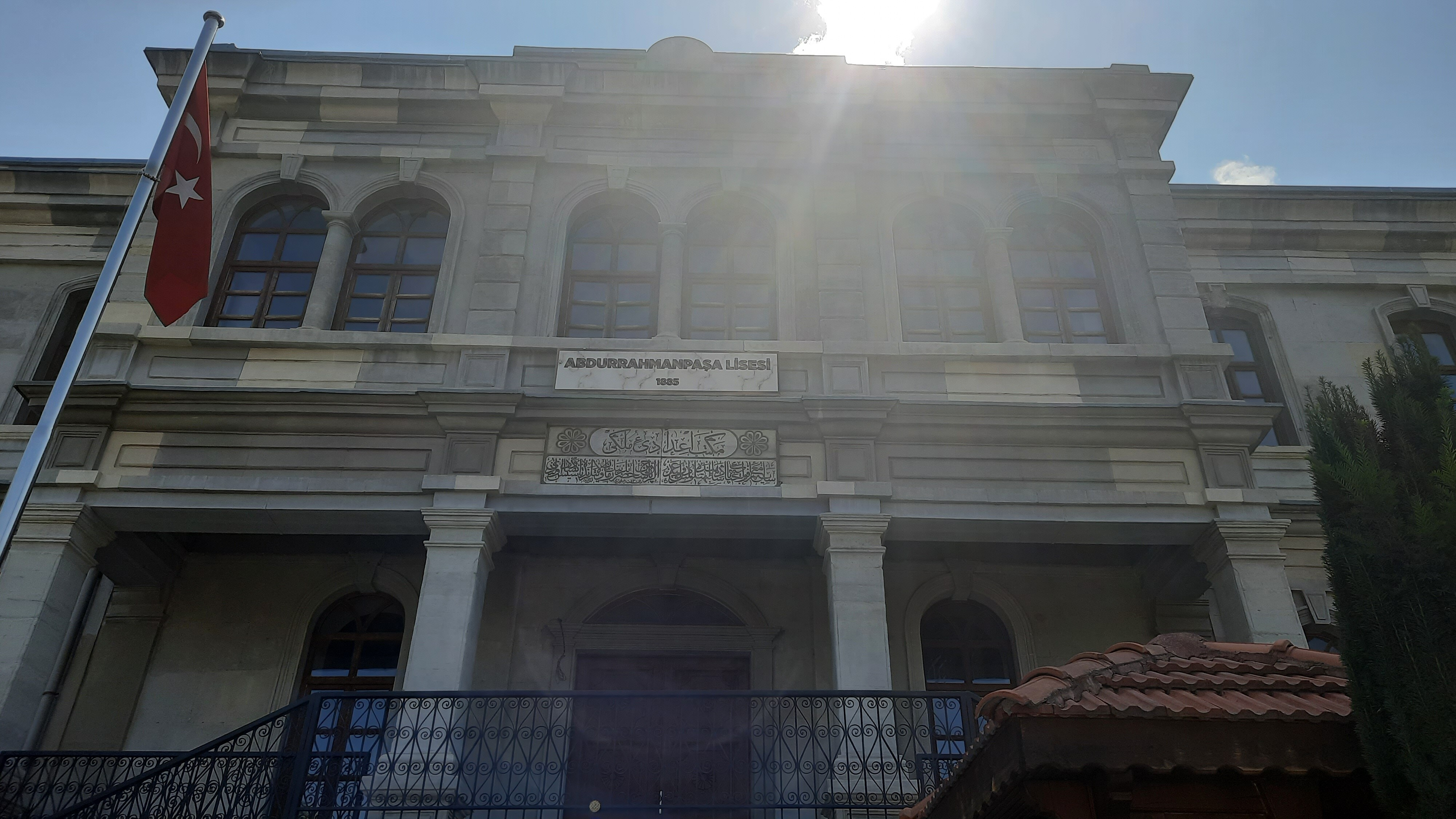

Location
- Cebrail district 125. Yıl Atatürk Caddesi No: 3 Kastamonu, Center, 37100; Turkey
- Coordinates: 41°22′32.4703″N 33°46′35.4392″E

Information
- Former names: Kastamonu İdadi Mektebi (1885–1910); Kastamonu Mekteb-i Sultanîsi (1910–1923); Kastamonu Lisesi (1923–1963); Abdurrahmanpaşa Lisesi (1963–nowadays)
- Type: State high school
- Established: April 20, 1885; 140 years ago
- Founder: Abdurrahman Nureddin Pasha
- School board: Hüseyin Mısırlıoğlu; Harun Kartal; Muhammet Ercan Irgat; Ayten Canaslan
- Director: Hüseyin Mısırlıoğlu
- Principal: Hüseyin Mısırlıoğlu
- Age range: 14 +
- Average class size: 30
- Language: English and German
- Slogan: "İrfan Meşalesi Yurda Lisemiz"
- Sports: Basketball; Badminton; Tennis
- Website: abdurrahmanpasalisesi.meb.k12.tr

Abdurrahman Pasha High School (Ottoman: كاستامونو صولتانيسي, كاستامونو ايداديسي; Turkish: Abdurrahmanpaşa Lisesi, Kastamonu İdadisi) is the first official high school opened in Anatolia in 1885.

== Founding ==
Abdurrahman Nureddin Pasha, who served as the grand vizier for two months and eleven days between May 2, 1882 - July 12, 1882, started his studies by thinking that the region needed educational reforms just like in Istanbul, while he was the Governor of Kastamonu. As a result of his studies, he decided to establish a high school.

== Construction ==
Kastamonu Abdurrahman Pasha High School served together with the Military High School at the time it was founded and consisted of two classes. In 1888, the number of classes was 3, and at the beginning of 1891–1892, the number of classes was 5. At the same time, the school has been converted into a boarding dormitory.

It prevented slipping by placing the facade of the building facing the stream on solid foundations. Thousand Ottoman Golds were spent on this work alone. Abdurrahman Pasha took a close interest in the construction of the High School building, collected 8500 gold lira, which is necessary for the entire building, from the public, and expenditures were made by a commission formed from the public. The School Building was completed in 4 years.

After the declaration of the second constitutional monarchy in the Ottoman Empire, many high schools were changed to "Sultani". Abdurrahman Pasha High School is one of these high schools.

== New Building ==
The number of students coming from the surrounding provinces of Abdurrahman Pasha High School increased, and it could not respond to the students who wanted to come to the school. Since the need to construct an additional building arose, the houses facing Atatürk Street on the creek side of the High School building were expropriated and the construction of the middle section was started on September 29, 1937, in accordance with the project received from the Ministry. This building consists of 10 classrooms, 2 laboratories, 1 conference hall, 1 dining hall and 1 cupboard, and is currently used as the second high school building.

== Directorate ==
After Birol Yılmaz, who was the principal of Abdurrahman Pasha High School for 6 years, died at the age of 57 due to coronavirus, Hüseyin Mısırlıoğlu was appointed to this task. There are also three assistant principals:

- Harun Kartal
- Muhammet Ercan Irgat
- Ayten Canarslan

== Gallipoli Campaign Martyrs ==
In 1915, 67 students from Abdurrahman Pasha High School, 63 of whom were from high school and 4 from the middle school, were sent to the Gallipoli and Caucasus fronts as soldiers. 13 students, 8 from high school and 5 from middle school, who joined the army in 1916, fought in different fronts of the First World War. Since 1916-1917 and October 1917, at least 30 students who were trained under the military law were conscripted into the military. Thus, the number of students from Abdurrahman Pasha High School who participated in the First World War reached at least 120.

Abdurrahman Pasha High School could not graduate any of its students in the academic years of 1916-1917 and 1917-1918 due to the fact that all of its students and some teachers left the school and went to the front.
