= Ibrahim Hakki Pasha =

Grand Vizier of the Ottoman Empire from 1910 to 1911

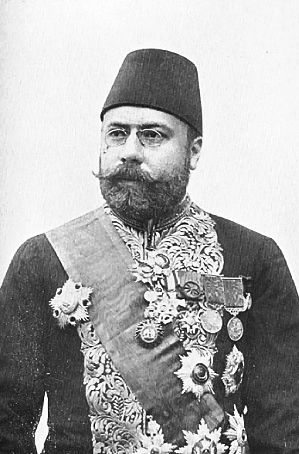
- Ibrahim Hakki Pasha

Grand Vizier of the Ottoman Empire
- In office 12 January 1910 – 30 September 1911
- Monarch: Mehmed V
- Preceded by: Hüseyin Hilmi Pasha
- Succeeded by: Mehmed Said Pasha

Personal details
- Born: 1863 Constantinople, Ottoman Empire
- Died: 29 July 1918 (aged 54–55) Berlin, German Empire

Ibrahim Hakki Pasha (Ottoman Turkish: ابراهیم حقی پاشا, Turkish: İbrahim Hakkı Paşa 1862–1918) was an Ottoman statesman, who served as Grand Vizier of the Ottoman Empire between 1910 and 1911. He also served as the Minister of Education and Internal Affairs and in 1910, managed the Ministry of Foreign Affairs and Public Works while Grand Vizier. He served as Ottoman ambassador to Germany and to the Kingdom of Italy.

== Biography ==
İbrahim Hakkı was born to a Turkish family in Istanbul in 1863. His father was Sakızlı Mehmed Remzi Efendi, the President of the Istanbul Municipality Council (İstanbul Şehremaneti Meclis Reisi).

He graduated from the Mülkiye Mektebi in 1882. In 1884, he became the translator of the Mabeyn-i hümayun. He translated detective novels for Sultan Abdulhamid II. He also gave lectures at the Law and Trade Schools. In 1894, he was appointed as the Legal Counselor of the Sublime Porte (Hukuk Müşavirliği). He served as the chairman and member of approximately 30 diplomatic commissions. He was sent to Crete and the United States before the declaration of the Second Constitutional Era.

In 1908, he served as the Minister of Education in the 7th Said Pasha cabinet, which was established the day before the declaration of the Second Constitutional Era, and as the Minister of Education and Internal Affairs in the Mehmed Kâmil Pasha cabinet. Since he did not want to remain in this position, he resigned from the ministry in December 1908. He assumed the duty of the Ottoman Empire's ambassador to Rome. He continued in this position until the end of 1909.

After Hüseyin Hilmi Pasha resigned from the Grand Viziership, İbrahim Hakkı became the Grand Vizier in 1910. He also served as the Minister of Foreign Affairs and Public Works. He resigned from the ministry when Italy invaded Ottoman Tripolitania.

Hakki Pasha also spent considerable amounts of time in London between February 1913 and the outbreak of World War I, working on negotiations concerning the Berlin-Baghdad Railway and a settlement for the Second Balkan War. During that visit, Hakki Pasha met with King George V. He returned to Istanbul when World War I began.

He was appointed as ambassador to Berlin in 1915. Additionally, he was appointed as a member of the Senate in 1917. He served in the Ottoman delegation of the Brest-Litovsk Peace Treaty. He died shortly after returning to Berlin on July 29, 1918. His body was brought to Istanbul and buried in the Yahya Efendi Lodge. İbrahim Hakkı Pasha, who had works in the field of science as well as being a statesman, wrote several textbooks.

He was awarded the Order of Karađorđe's Star.

== Works ==
- Medhal-i Hukuk-u Düvel, 1885
- Tarih-i Hukuk-u Beyneddüvel, 1885
- Küçük Osmanlı Tarihi, 1890
- Tarih-i Umûmi, 3 cilt, 1887-1888
