= Mehmed Said Pasha =

Ottoman monarchist, senior official and newspaper editor (1838–1914)

Küçük Mehmed Said Pasha
- محمد سعيد
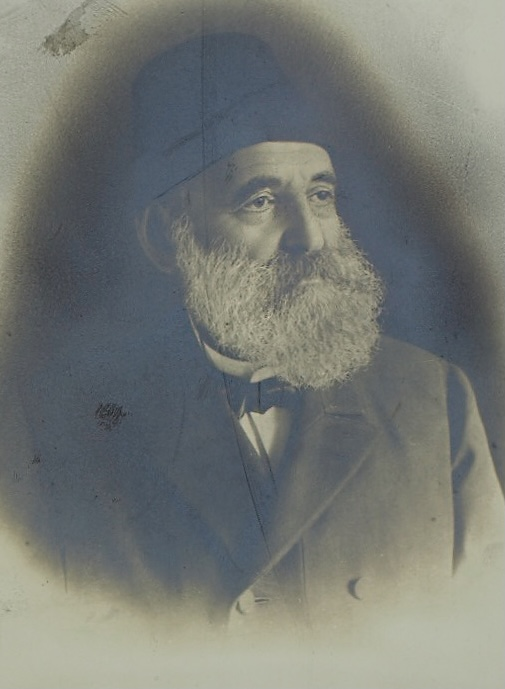

Grand Vizier of the Ottoman Empire
- In office 18 October 1879 – 9 June 1880
- Monarch: Abdul Hamid II
- Preceded by: Ahmed Arifi Pasha
- Succeeded by: Kadri Pasha
- In office 12 September 1880 – 2 May 1882
- Monarch: Abdul Hamid II
- Preceded by: Kadri Pasha
- Succeeded by: Abdurrahman Nureddin Pasha
- In office 12 July 1882 – 30 November 1882
- Monarch: Abdul Hamid II
- Preceded by: Abdurrahman Nureddin Pasha
- Succeeded by: Ahmed Vefik Pasha
- In office 3 December 1882 – 24 September 1885
- Monarch: Abdul Hamid II
- Preceded by: Ahmed Vefik Pasha
- Succeeded by: Kâmil Pasha
- In office 9 June 1895 – 3 October 1895
- Monarch: Abdul Hamid II
- Preceded by: Ahmed Cevad Pasha
- Succeeded by: Kâmil Pasha
- In office 18 November 1901 – 15 January 1903
- Monarch: Abdul Hamid II
- Preceded by: Halil Rifat Pasha
- Succeeded by: Mehmed Ferid Pasha
- In office 22 July 1908 – 6 August 1908
- Monarch: Abdul Hamid II
- Preceded by: Mehmed Ferid Pasha
- Succeeded by: Kâmil Pasha
- In office 30 September 1911 – 22 July 1912
- Monarch: Mehmed V
- Preceded by: İbrahim Hakkı Pasha
- Succeeded by: Ahmed Muhtar Pasha

Personal details
- Born: 1838 Erzurum, Erzurum Eyalet, Ottoman Empire
- Died: 10 January 1914 (aged 75–76) Istanbul, Ottoman Empire
- Nickname: Şapur Çelebi

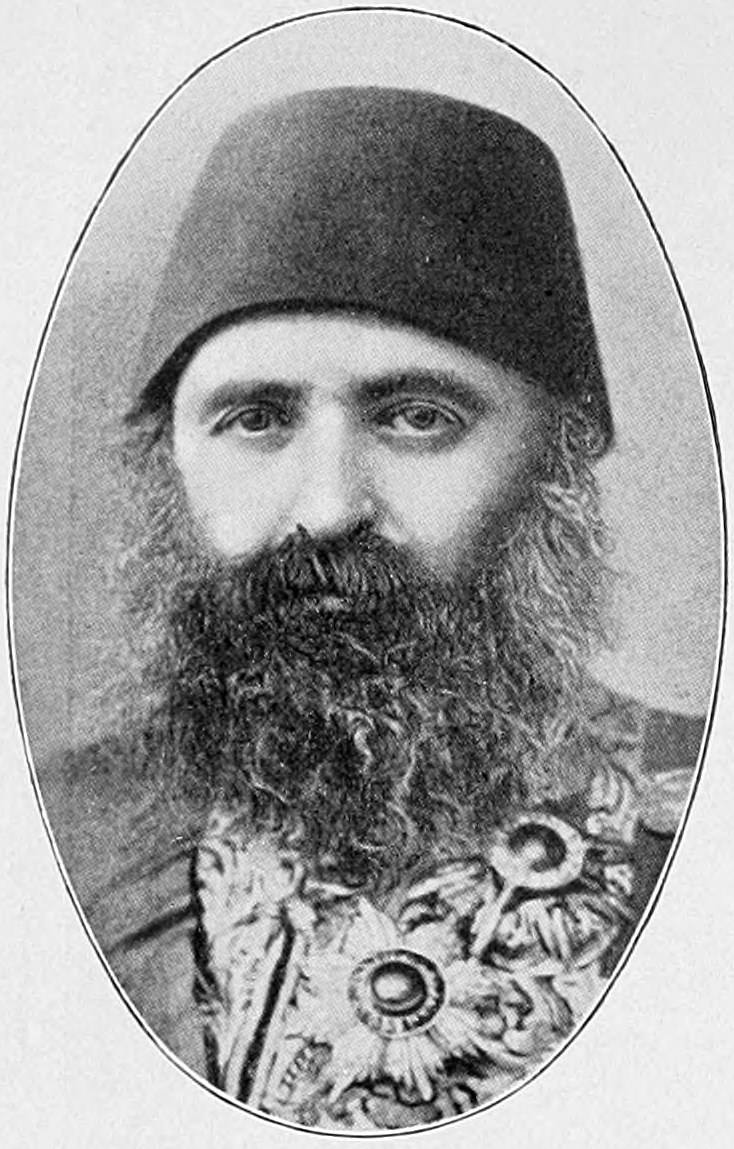
Portrait of a younger Said Pasha

Mehmed Said Pasha (Ottoman Turkish: محمد سعيد پاشا; 1838–1914), also known as Küçük Said Pasha, was an Ottoman Turkish monarchist, senator, statesman and editor of the Turkish newspaper Cerîde-i Havâdis. He served as grand vizier for nine years in total, seven times during the reign of Abdul Hamid II and twice during the Second Constitutional Monarchy.

His epithet makes him "Said Pasha the Younger" to distinguish him from a contemporary statesman İngiliz Said Pasha, who was also known as Büyük Said Pasha, or "Said Pasha the Elder". Küçük Said was also known as Mabeyn Başkâtibi Said Bey in this youth.

He was known for his opposition to the extension of foreign influence in the Ottoman Empire. He was among the statesmen who were disliked by the Committee of Union and Progress (CUP). However, in his last two grand vizierships, Said Pasha was supported by the CUP in the Chamber of Deputies, and his last grand vizierate ended in 1912 with a military memorandum against the Unionists.

== Early life ==
Mehmed Said was born in Erzurum. His father was Ali Namık Efendi, a foreign minister bureaucrat. According to his contemporary Petre Kharischirashvili, he was of Georgian descent. His education was in the madrasa, which started in Erzurum and continued in Istanbul. There he learned French. He joined the Kalemiye in Istanbul, and soon the petty civil service.

== Bureaucratic career ==
He returned to Erzurum for his first civil service assignment in 1853 where he worked in the eyalet's bureau of commutations (tahrirat kalemi). In 1857 he joined the Anatolian army's bureau of communications. Said went back to Istanbul, where he was the deputy clerk of the Supreme Council (Meclis-i Vâlâ halife kâtip). He then became chief of the Archipelago Vilayet municipal council (Adalar Bölgesi Belediye Dairesi reisi) and chief clerk of the Rumeli Inspection Committee (Rumeli Teftiş Heyeti başkatibi) following which he became the chief clerk of the government printing office (Matbaa-i Amire başkatibi). After a brief stint as chief clerk of the Court of Cassation (Dîvân-ı Ahkâm-ı Adliyye muhakemat başkatibi) he became director of communication of the Ministry of Trade (Ticaret Nezareti mektupçusu) before taking on the same role in the Ministry of Education.

Mehmed Said contributed to the provincial reform by writing the Regulation on the General Administration of Provinces (İdare-i Umumiye-i Vilayet Nizamnamesini). This caught the attention of Mehmed Emin Âli Pasha.

== High politics ==
He became first secretary to Sultan Abdul Hamid II shortly after the sultan's accession, and is said to have contributed to the realizations of his majesty's design of concentrating power in his own hands; later he became a senator, minister of the interior, minister of finance, royal treasurer, then governor of Ankara and then Bursa, justice minister, finally reaching the high post of grand vizier in 1879. It is not known what his role was in the 1876 coups d'état.

He was grand vizier seven times under Abdul Hamid II, and twice under his successor, Mehmed V.

=== First premiership ===
October 1879 can be accepted as the date when the political uncertainties of the beginning of Abdul Hamid's reign ended and the power without question passed to the palace. During Said Pasha's first grand viziership, he mostly dealt with financial and economic measures and tried to reduce government expenditures. He was dismissed from the position of grand vizier in June 1880.

=== Second premiership ===
He began his second term as Grand Vizier on September 12, 1880. The most important events of the premiership were the trial of Mithat Pasha in Yıldız Palace. Ottoman debts were then collected through the establishment of Ottoman Public Debt Administration with the Muharrem Decree. In 1881, France declared Tunisia a French colony a brief military campaign while in Egypt Urabi Pasha lost his nationalist struggle against the Europeans. Due to these events, Mehmed Said Pasha did not succeed in measures to reduce state debts and provide stability. He was dismissed as grand vizier on May 2, 1882, due to the direct intervention of the British in the Egypt issue.

=== Third premiership ===
However, two months later, the new grand vizier Abdurrahman Nureddin Pasha was dismissed as Grand Vizier since Abdul Hamid did not share his concern on the European attempts to invade Egypt, which started with the bombing of Alexandria in July. Mehmed Said Pasha was appointed grand vizier for the third time on 12 July 1882. This period began when Egypt came under British control. He was dismissed two months later on 30 November 1882 due to clashes between himself and the sultan. He was arrested three days later.

=== Fourth premiership ===
He was brought back to the grand viziership for the fourth time on 3 December 1882. This time his ministry lasted for two years and two months. In this period, there was civil service reform. Recruitment, appointment, promotion and retirement of civil servants were reformed and reorganized. He also brought about educational reforms. First of all, importance was given to the opening of a large number of new schools in the country. However, he wanted to suppress the Bulgarian nationalist revolt that broke out in Eastern Rumelia, but Sultan Abdul Hamid thought that these troops could use them against him, so he vetoed the operation. On September 18, 1885, Eastern Rumelia was annexed by Bulgaria. He was dismissed from office a week later. For ten years he was without a job.

=== Fifth premiership ===
During the height of the Hamidian massacres, Western states demanded reforms. In order to implement these reforms, Said Pasha was brought to the grand viziership for the fifth time on 8 June 1895. This time, he was at odds with the Sultan because of the Armenians demonstrating in Istanbul. Said Pasha claimed that the War Mınıster Nazım Pasha was negligent in his duties of quelling unrest and demanded that he be removed from office. However, Abdul Hamid did not agree to this and dismissed Said Pasha after less than three months.

Two months later the took refuge at the British embassy in Constantinople, and, though then assured of his personal liberty and safety, remained practically under house arrest with his son for six years.

=== Sixth premiership ===
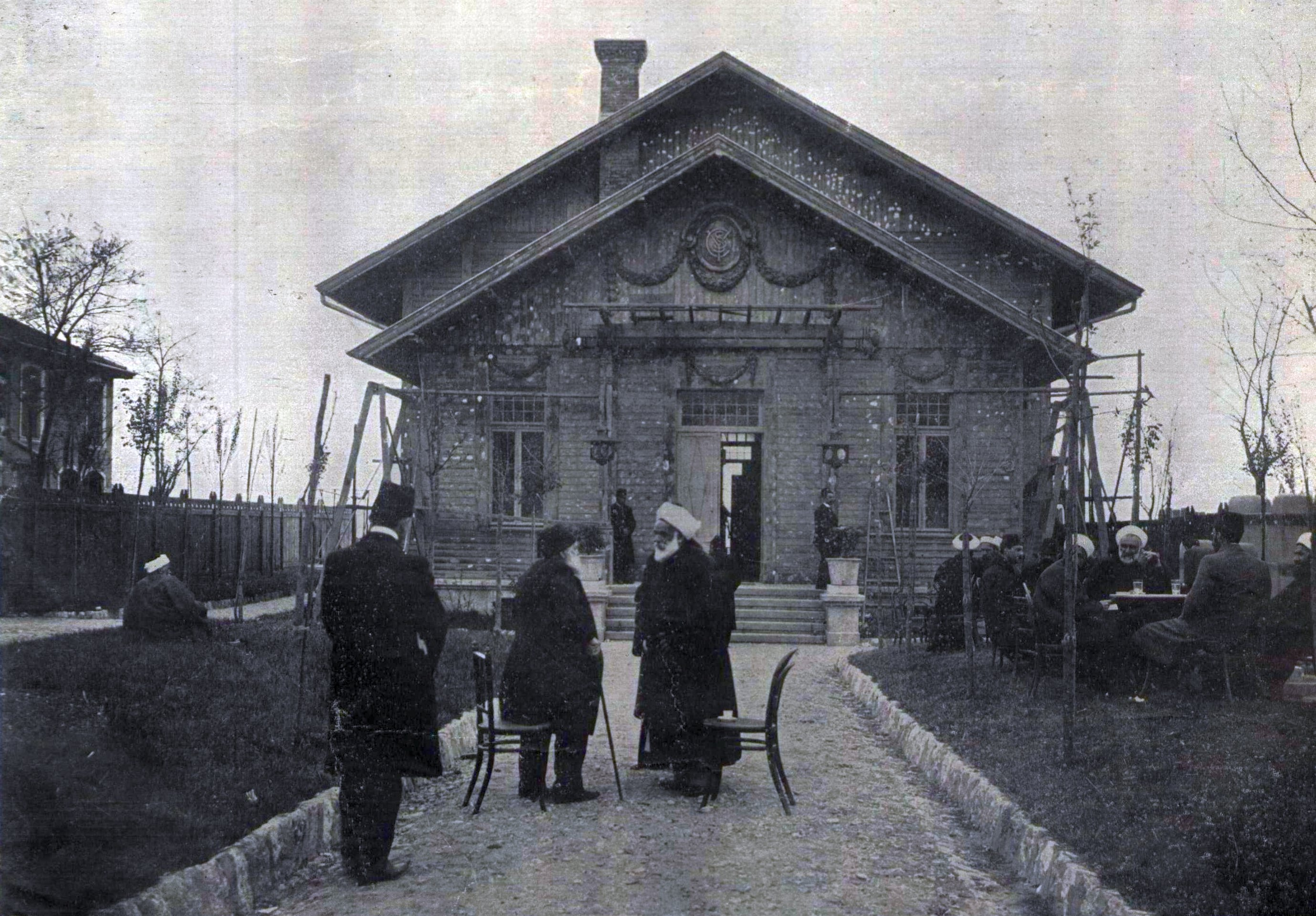
Said Pasha in front of the San Stefanos Yacht Club, 10 May 1909

On 18 November 1901, he was appointed grand vizier again after he wrote to the Sultan that he would serve as a Grand Vizier like a bailiff. However this new interpretation of his role in government was too much for him and he complained that the premiership was reduced to being like a scarecrow. After two years in this post, he had a disagreement with the War Minister Mehmed Rıza Pasha about the problems in the Rumelian army. He gave an ultimatum to the Sultan that if he did not arrest Rıza, he would resign. Said was instead dismissed one month after this resignation threat.

=== Seventh premiership ===
He came into temporary prominence again during the revolution of 1908. On 22 July he succeeded Mehmed Ferid Pasha as grand vizier, and mediated the declaration of the Second Constitutional Monarchy. However, in the first two weeks, disagreements arose within the government delegation over who would be the minister of war and who would be the minister of the navy. Said Pasha was uneasy about the sultan's intervention in the establishment of this government. For this reason, he resigned on 6 August 1908, after two weeks of vizierate, citing the Sultan's interference in the cabinet list, and he was replaced by the more liberal Kâmil Pasha, at the insistence of the Young Turks.

Also during 1908, Mehmed Said Pasha bought the famed Istanbul arcade in the Beyoğlu district, today known as Çiçek Pasajı ("Flower Passage"). The modern name became common in the 1940s; during Mehmed Said Pasha's ownership in the 1900s and 1910s, the arcade was known as Sait Paşa Pasajı ("Said Pasha Passage").

=== Eighth and ninth premiership ===
Following the resignation of Ibrahim Hakkı Pasha in the wake of Italy's declaration of war on the Ottoman Empire in 1911, he was again called to the premiership. He attempted to resign on New Year's Eve 1911 on disagreements with his cabinet on whether to dissolve parliament, but he was reappointed the same day. His time as Grand Vizier was under the de facto rule of the Committee of Union and Progress (CUP) and the War Minister Mahmut Şevket Pasha.

In the "election of clubs" held in February 1912, he allowed the CUP to seize the parliament through egregious voter fraud and intimidation. However, with Mahmut Şevket Pasha's departure from government and another Albanian revolt, a military clique known as the Savior Officers who backed the defeated Freedom and Accord Party forced him to resign from the grand viziership for the last time.

Following his departure Said Pasha became head of the Council of State and then President of the Ottoman Senate.

== Death ==
Just before the start of World War I, he developed bronchitis and died on 1 March 1914 in Istanbul. He was buried at the entrance of Eyüp Sultan Mosque.

Preceded by Arifi Pasha	Grand Vizier of the Ottoman Empire; 1879–1880	Succeeded by Kadri Pasha
Preceded by Kadri Pasha	Grand Vizier of the Ottoman Empire; 1880–1882	Succeeded by Abdurrahman Nureddin Pasha
Preceded by Abdurrahman Nureddin Pasha	Grand Vizier of the Ottoman Empire; 1882	Succeeded by Ahmed Vefik Pasha
Preceded by Ahmed Vefik Pasha	Grand Vizier of the Ottoman Empire; 1882–1885	Succeeded by Mehmed Kamil Pasha
Preceded by Ahmed Cevad Pasha	Grand Vizier of the Ottoman Empire; 1895	Succeeded by Mehmed Kamil Pasha
Preceded by Halil Rifat Pasha	Grand Vizier of the Ottoman Empire; 1901–1903	Succeeded by Mehmed Ferid Pasha
Preceded by Mehmed Ferid Pasha	Grand Vizier of the Ottoman Empire; 1908	Succeeded by Mehmed Kamil Pasha
Preceded by Ibrahim Hakki Pasha	Grand Vizier of the Ottoman Empire; 1911–1912	Succeeded by Ahmed Muhtar Pasha
