= Ahmed Arifi Pasha =

Grand Vizier of the Ottoman Empire (1879)

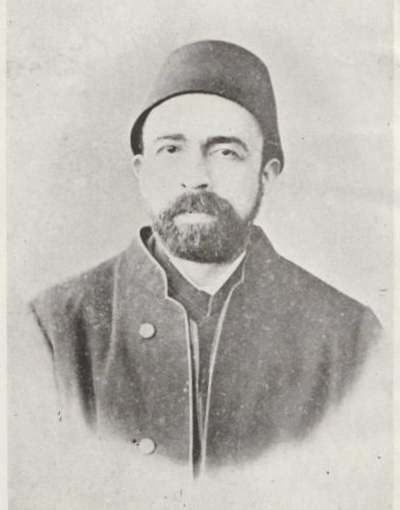

Grand Vizier of the Ottoman Empire

Personal details
- Born: 1830 Istanbul, Ottoman Empire
- Died: 1895 or 1896

Ahmed Arifi Pasha (Ottoman Turkish: احمد عریفی پاشا) (1830 – 1895/96) was an Ottoman noble, senator, statesman, and reformist, who served as Grand Vizier of the Ottoman Empire in 1879. In contemporary English-language accounts, he was known as Aarifi Pasha. He was a liberal and supported Midhat Pasha’s efforts to introduce the First Constitutional Era.

== Biography ==
He was born in Istanbul in 1830; his father was a diplomat named Şekip Pasha (in contemporary English, Shekib Pasha). He accompanied his father on diplomatic missions to various European capitals, including Rome, Vienna, and Paris. He acquired a good knowledge of French. He served in a series of posts at home and abroad, including ambassador to Vienna and later ambassador to Paris.

On 28 July 1879 he became Grand Vizier but held the post for little more than a month.

He later held various other posts and died in 1895/96.

== See also ==
- List of Ottoman grand viziers

== Bibliography ==
- Cooper, Thompson (1884). "Aarifi Pasha" . Men of the Time (eleventh ed.). London: George Routledge & Sons. p. 1.
- M. Th. Houtsma; A. J. Wensinck; T. W. Arnold (1993). E.J. Brill's First Encyclopaedia of Islam, 1913-1936. Vol. I (1st (reissued) ed.). Brill Academic Publishers. p. 432. ISBN 90-04-09796-1.

Preceded by Tunuslu Hayreddin Pasha	Chief Minister of the Ottoman Empire; 1879	Succeeded by Küçük Mehmet Sait Pasha
