= Kâmil Pasha =

Grand Vizier of the Ottoman Empire (1885–1891, 1895, 1908–1909, 1912–1913)

Kıbrıslı Mehmed Kâmil Pasha
- محمد كامل پاشا
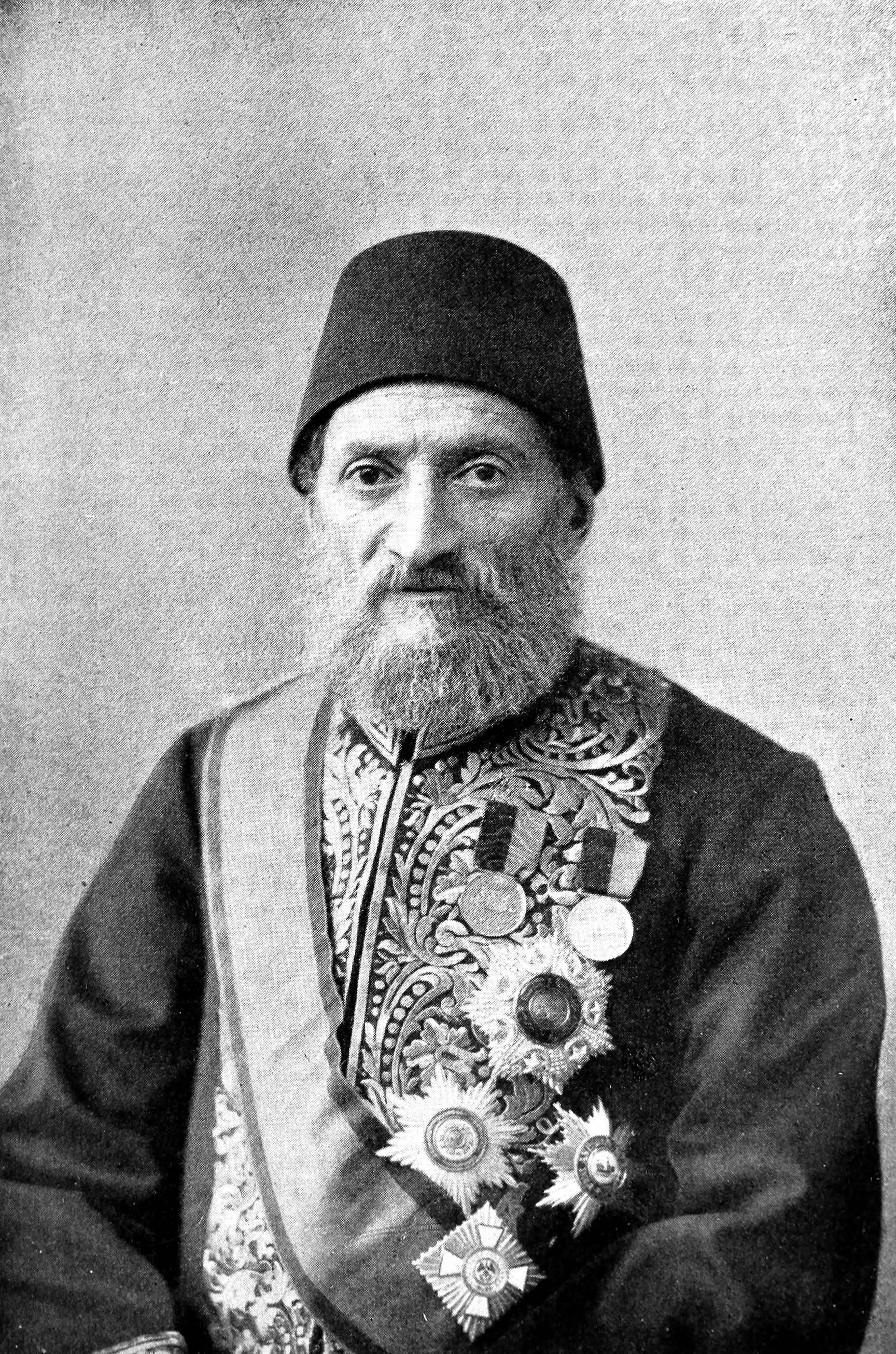
- Kâmil Pasha wearing the diplomatic uniform

Grand Vizier of the Ottoman Empire
- In office 25 September 1885 – 4 September 1891
- Monarch: Abdul Hamid II
- Preceded by: Mehmed Said Pasha
- Succeeded by: Ahmed Cevad Pasha
- In office 2 October 1895 – 7 November 1895
- Monarch: Abdul Hamid II
- Preceded by: Mehmed Said Pasha
- Succeeded by: Halil Rifat Pasha
- In office 5 August 1908 – 14 February 1909
- Monarch: Abdul Hamid II
- Preceded by: Mehmed Said Pasha
- Succeeded by: Hüseyin Hilmi Pasha
- In office 29 October 1912 – 23 January 1913
- Monarch: Mehmed V
- Preceded by: Ahmed Muhtar Pasha
- Succeeded by: Mahmud Shevket Pasha

Personal details
- Born: 1833 Nicosia, Cyprus Sanjak, Ottoman Empire
- Died: 14 November 1913 (aged 80) Nicosia, British Cyprus

Mehmed Kâmil Pasha (Ottoman Turkish: محمد كامل پاشا; Turkish: Kıbrıslı Mehmet Kâmil Paşa, "Mehmed Kâmil Pasha the Cypriot"), also spelled as Kâmil Pasha (1833 – 14 November 1913), was an Ottoman statesman and liberal politician of Turkish Cypriot origin in the late 19th century and early 20th century. He was the Grand Vizier of the Empire during four different periods.

== Early life ==
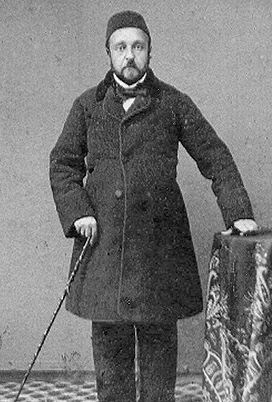
Kâmil Pasha, 1860s

Mehmed Kâmil Pasha was born in Nicosia, Ottoman Cyprus in 1833. He was the son of an artillery captain, Salih Agha, from the village of Pyrogi. His paternal grandfather was from Karakese village of Anamur. Kâmil's mother was Pembe Hanım, who also hailed from Cyprus.

He was educated on the island until the age of thirteen; He learned Arabic, Persian, French and Greek. In 1845, he was taken to Egypt with his younger brother and studied at Elsine Madrasa. Shortly after, when the madrasah was converted into a military academy, he took courses in military sciences. He graduated as a cavalry lieutenant.

His first post was in the household of the Khedive of Egypt, Abbas I, who at that time was only nominally dependent to the central Ottoman power in Constantinople. In the course of this appointment, he visited London for the Great Exhibition of 1851 in charge of one of the Khedive's sons. Kâmil's sojourn in London left in him a lifelong admiration for Britain and during his career within the Ottoman state, he was always known to be an Anglophile.

He was fluent in English, and sought close ties between the United Kingdom and the Ottoman Empire.

== High politics in the Ottoman Empire ==
After remaining in Egypt for ten years, Mehmed Kâmil exchanged the service of Abbas I for that of the Ottoman Government as of 1860 and for the ensuing nineteen years – that is to say until he first entered the Cabinet – he filled very numerous administrative appointments in every part of the Empire. He governed, or helped to govern vilayets such as Eastern Rumelia, Hercegovina, Kosovo, and his native Cyprus.

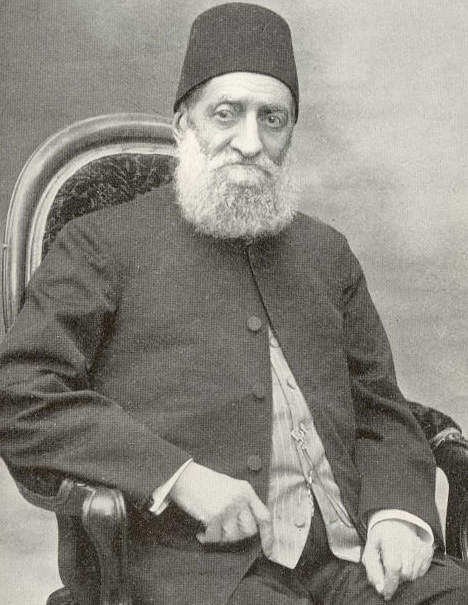
Kâmil Pasha in 1909.

Kâmil Pasha was appointed Grand Vizier from 25 September 1885 to 4 September 1891, under Abdul Hamid II's reign. During this time he developed a rivalry with Mehmed Said Pasha.

His second premiership came about during the height of the Armenian Crisis during the Hamidian massacres. On 2 October 1895 he was appointed Grand Vizier in a tense atmosphere. As a neo-Tanzimatist, Kâmil Pasha petitioned the sultan to put responsible governance back in the hands of the Sublime Porte. He received support from the Great Powers and Young Turk media. Several members of the Committee of Union and Progress supported Kâmil Pasha in his showdown with the Sultan, but by 7 November, Kâmil Pasha was out of high office, his "coup" ending in status quo. For the next decade, he was exiled as governor of Aydın.

When Said Pasha resigned from office soon after the Young Turk Revolution, Abdul Hamid II and the CUP compromised with Kâmil Pasha to run the government. Kâmil soon had an antagonistic relationship with the committee, and associated himself with Prince Sabahaddin's Liberty Party. His premiership lasted just over five months, before the CUP censured him with a vote of no confidence, and replaced him with someone more pliant to the committee's wishes.

For three years he stayed out of politics. In 1911 he contracted pneumonia and went to Egypt for a change of atmosphere. There he met with King George V of England and the queen, who were on a trip to India, for lunch on the ship. This incident caused him to be heavily criticized in the pro-CUP press. After a while he returned to Istanbul.

After the shuttering of parliament in summer 1912 by the Savior Officers, he became head of the Council of State in Muhtar Pasha's Great Cabinet. With his resignation Kâmil returned to the premiership leading a government initially friendly to Freedom and Accord. He was appointed Grand Vizier for his friendly relations with the British (he was often known as İngiliz Kâmil, or "English Kâmil", for his Anglophilia), in the hopes that he would be able to get favorable terms for the end of the ongoing, disastrous First Balkan War (since the victorious Bulgaria's foreign interests were represented by the British). In January 1913, Kâmil's government decided to accept severe peace conditions including massive territorial losses.

The CUP used this pretext for their coup d'état on 23 January 1913. That day, Enver Bey, one of the CUP's military leaders, burst with some of his associates into the Sublime Porte while the cabinet was in session. By most accounts, one of Enver's officers, Yakup Cemil, shot the Minister of War Nazım Pasha and the group pressed Kâmil Pasha to resign immediately at gunpoint.

Kâmil was put under house arrest and surveillance. The ex-Grand Vizier (who probably was in danger of life) was invited by his British friend Lord Kitchener to stay with him in Cairo. After three months in Egypt, Mehmed Kâmil Pasha decided to wait for favourable turn of events in his native Cyprus, now under British occupation. Five weeks after his return to Cyprus, the assassination of his successor to the premiership, Mahmut Şevket Pasha, occurred in June 1913, by a relative of Nazım Pasha to avenge his death. The CUP regime reacted with persecution of well-known opposition politicians. Djemal Pasha, then the CUP prefect of the capital Constantinople, indicated to Kâmil's family that they had to leave Ottoman Turkey or he too would be arrested. His family joined his exile in Cyprus.

== Death ==
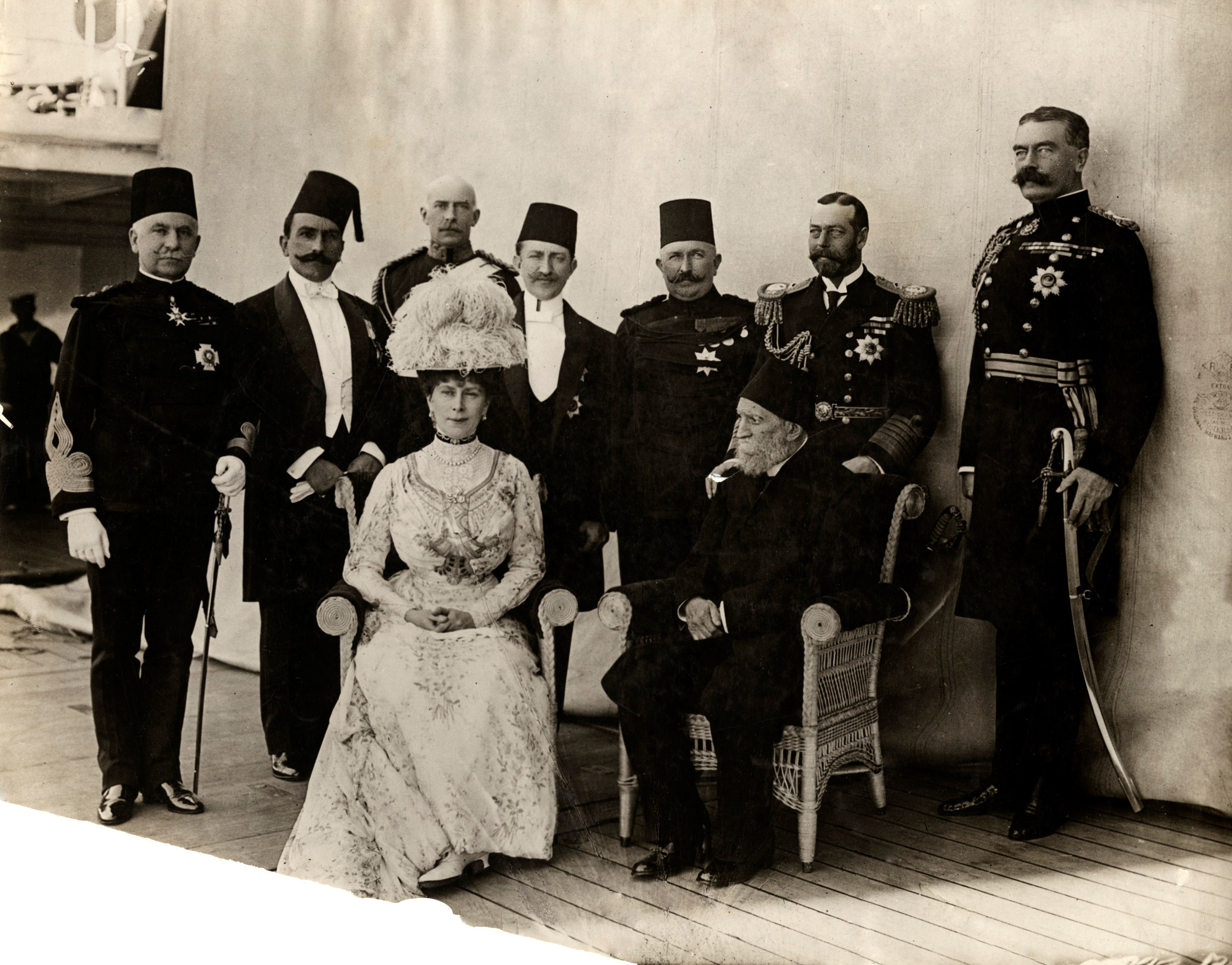
With British, Turkish, Egyptian royalty, 1911

On 14 November 1913, while preparing plans for revisiting England in 1914, Kâmil Pasha suddenly died of syncope and was buried in the courtyard of the Arab Ahmet Mosque.

== Family ==
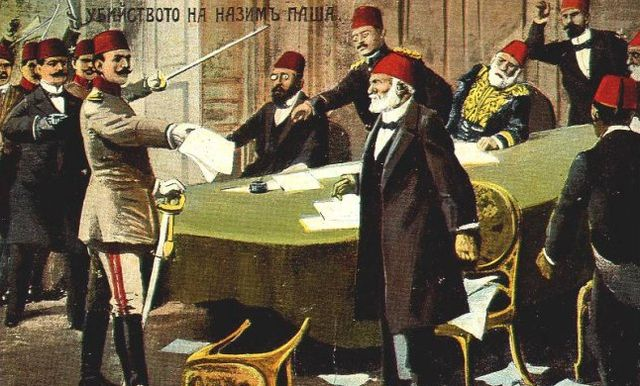
Enver Bey asking Kâmil Pasha to resign during the raid on the Sublime Porte.

Kâmil married Layika (Bayur) and had several children. His grandson is Hikmet Bayur and his grand nephew is filmmaker Zeki Alasya. His son-in-law is general Naci Eldeniz. Tekin Arıburun, president of the Turkish Senate from 1970 to 1977, is his grandson-in-law.

== Legacy ==
Sir Ronald Storrs, British Governor of Cyprus from 1926 to 1932, erected a memorial to be raised over Kâmil Pasha's grave. He also composed the English inscription, carved on the headstone below a Turkish one. It runs as follows:

His Highness Kiamil Pasha
Son of Captain Salih Agha of Pyroi
Born in Nicosia in 1833
Treasury Clerk
Commissioner of Larnaca
Director of Evqaf
Four times Grand Vizier of the Ottoman Empire
A Great Turk and
A Great Man.

== See also ==
- List of Ottoman grand viziers

== Sources ==
- Cyprus by Sir Harry Luke for a short biography of Kamil Pasha and a moving account of his funeral

Government offices
Preceded by Kartallı Mehmed Emin Pasha	Vali of Aleppo; 1877–1879	Succeeded by Abdullah Galib Pasha
Preceded by Hasan Fehmi Pasha	Vali of Aidin; 1895–1907	Succeeded by Ibrahim Faik Bey
Political offices
Preceded by Abdüllatif Subhi Pasha	Minister of Religious Endowments; 1880	Succeeded by Mehmed Nazif Pasha
Preceded by Mehmed Tahir Münif Efendi	Minister of Education; 1880–1881	Succeeded by Ali Fuad Bey
Preceded by Mehmed Asim Pasha	Minister of Religious Endowments; 1882–1885	Succeeded by Mustafa Zihni Efendi
Preceded by Küçük Mehmed Said Pasha	Grand Vizier; 1885–1891	Succeeded by Ahmed Cevad Pasha
Preceded by Küçük Mehmed Said Pasha	Grand Vizier; 1895	Succeeded by Halil Rifat Pasha
Preceded by Küçük Mehmed Said Pasha	Grand Vizier; 1908–1909	Succeeded by Hüseyin Hilmi Pasha
Preceded by Said Halim Pasha	Chairman of the Council of State; 1912	Succeeded by Arif Hikmet Pasha
Preceded by Gazi Ahmed Muhtar Pasha	Grand Vizier; 1912–1913	Succeeded by Mahmud Şevket Pasha
Notes and references
1. Kuneralp, Sinan (1999). Son dönem Osmanlı erkân ve ricali, 1839–1922 (in Turkish). Beylerbeyi, Istanbul: İsis.
