= Abdurrahman Nurettin Pasha =

Ottoman statesman and vizier (1836–1912)

- عبدالرحمن نور الدين
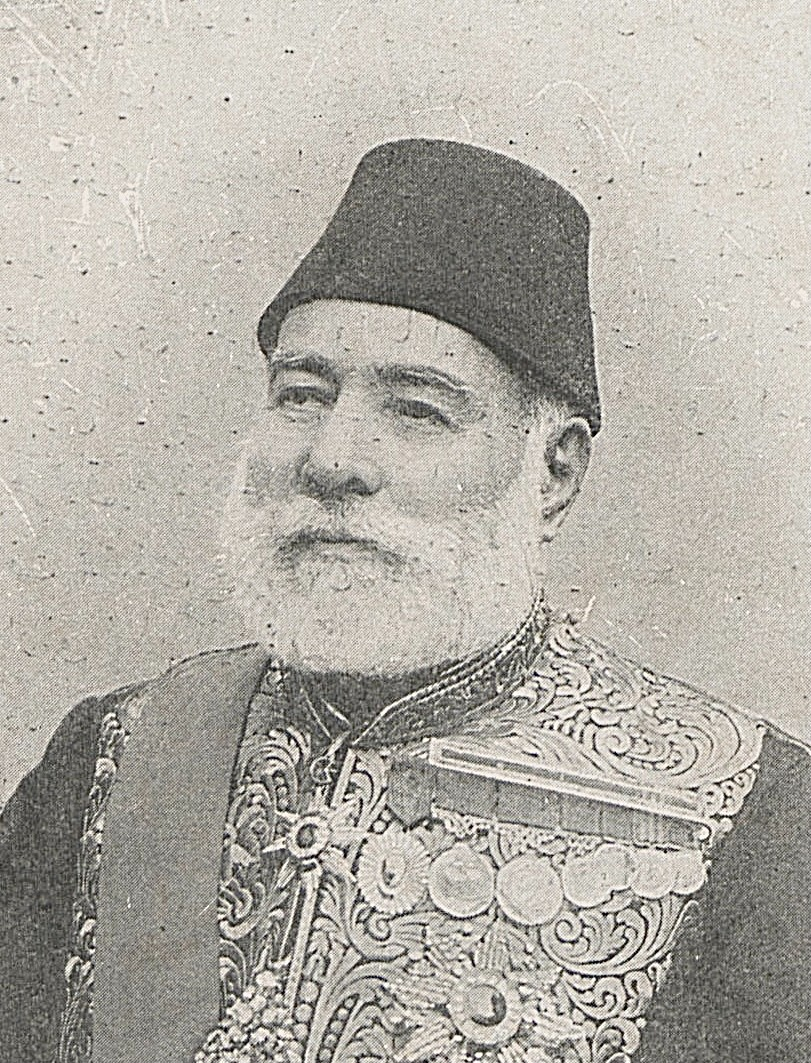

Grand Vizier of the Ottoman Empire
- In office 2 May 1882 – 12 July 1882
- Monarch: Abdülhamid II
- Preceded by: Mehmed Said Pasha
- Succeeded by: Mehmed Said Pasha

Governor of the Baghdad Vilayet
- In office 1879–1880
- Monarch: Abdülhamid II
- Preceded by: Qadri Pasha
- Succeeded by: Taqialden Pasha

Governor of the Aidin Vilayet
- In office 1891–1893
- Monarch: Abdülhamid II
- Preceded by: Halil Rifat Pasha
- Succeeded by: Hasan Fehmi Pasha

Personal details
- Born: 1836 Kütahya, Sanjak of Kütahya, Hüdavendigâr Eyalet, Ottoman Empire
- Died: 1912 (aged 75–76) Constantinople, Ottoman Empire

Abdurrahman Nurettin Pasha, (Ottoman Turkish: عبدالرحمن نور الدين پاشا; Turkish: Abdurrahman Nurettin Paşa) also known as Nurettin Pasha (1836–1912), was an Ottoman Turkish statesman. He was the Grand Vizier of the Ottoman Empire from 2 May 1882 to 12 July 1882.

== Biography ==
Born in Kütahya in 1836, He was a Turk, he was descendant of the Germiyanids, who flourished in that area after the decline and eventual fall of the Seljuq Sultanate of Rûm. His father, Haji Ali Pasha, was one of the Ottoman governors who died on 25 May 1874 while serving as the governor of Kastamonu.

Abdurrahman first served in various positions under his father. In 1872 he was promoted to the rank of vizier. He served as an Ottoman provincial governor (his posts included Ankara and Baghdad) before serving as grand vizier to Sultan Abdülhamid II in 1882. Later he was Minister of Justice (1895–1908).

The son of Abdurrahman Pasha married to Naile Sultan, daughter of Sultan Abdulhamid. The son-in-law of Abdurrahman Pasha was Turkish musicologist Hüseyin Sadeddin Arel, and his nephew was Münir Nurettin Selçuk, the Turkish classical musician.
