= Mehmed Ferid Pasha =

Grand Vizier of the Ottoman Empire from 1903 to 1908

Avlonyalı Mehmed Ferid Pasha محمد فرید پاشا Pasha
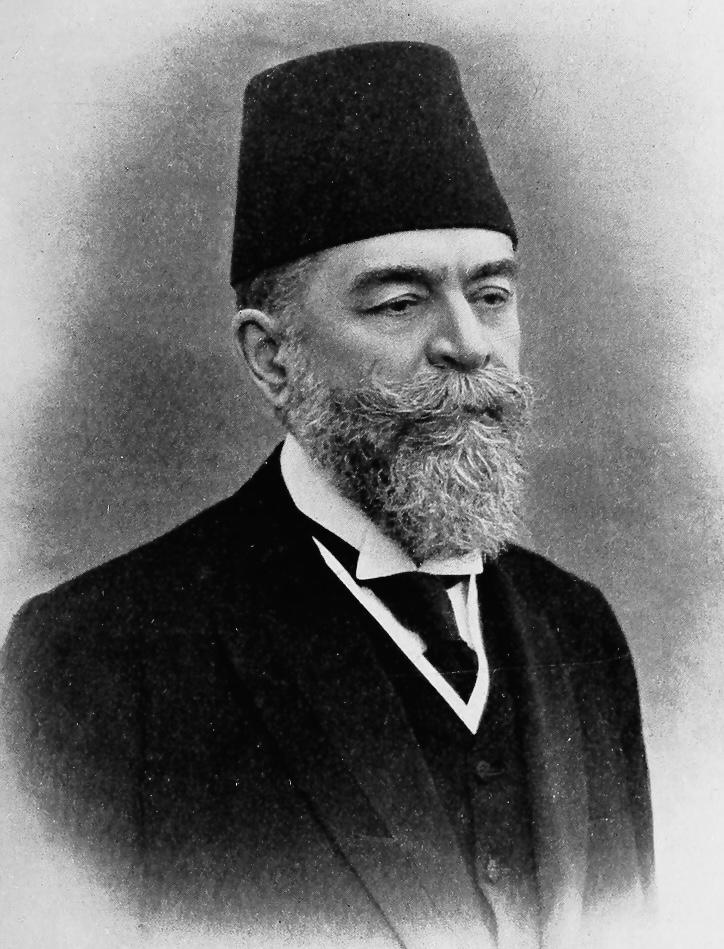

Grand Vizier of the Ottoman Empire
- In office 15 January 1903 – 22 July 1908
- Monarch: Abdülhamid II
- Preceded by: Mehmed Said Pasha
- Succeeded by: Mehmed Said Pasha

Personal details
- Born: 1851 Vlorë, Sanjak of Avlona, Janina Vilayet, Ottoman Empire (modern day Albania)
- Died: 1914 (aged 62–63) Sanremo, Liguria, Italy

Mehmed Ferid Pasha (Ottoman Turkish: محمد فرید پاشا, Turkish: Avlonyalı Ferit Paşa or Avlonyalı Mehmet Ferit Paşa, Albanian: Ferit pashë Vlora; 1851, Yanya, Ottoman Empire (modern-day Ioannina, Greece) – 1914, Sanremo, Kingdom of Italy) was an Ottoman-Albanian statesman. He served as the Grand Vizier of the Ottoman Empire from 15 January 1903 until 22 July 1908, at the time when the Sultan restored the 1876 Constitution following the Young Turk Revolution. Other than Ottoman Turkish he spoke the Albanian, Arabic, French, Italian, and Greek languages.

== Biography ==
Mehmed Ferid Pasha was born in Vlorë in the year 1851, back then it was in the Ottoman Empire, today in Albania. He was descended from the distinguished wealthy landowning Vlora family that had much influence in Southern Albania (up to Preveza) and Central Albania and provided the Ottoman state with senior officials for more than four centuries. His brother Syrja Vlora served as economic advisor to Sultan Abdul Hamid II and other family members included the modern Albanian state founder Ismail Qemal bey Vlora. During his youth, Ferid attended the Greek high school Zosimea in Yanina for his education and learned Greek, French, and Italian. In the late 1870s, Ferid Pasha had been involved with the Society for the Publication of Albanian Letters. After the collapse of the League of Prizren, he devoted himself to a career in the Ottoman bureaucracy, becoming at one time a governor of Konya in Anatolia.

Ferid Pasha was appointed as Grand Vizier (sadrazam) by Abdul Hamid II in 1903, after the sultan had defeated the League of Peja movement and closed down all Albanian schools in Albania. Amidst a deteriorating geopolitical situation in the Balkans, the sultan's reasons for choosing Ferid Pasha to serve in that role was him being from Vlorë, an Albanian, his good reputation and holding Albanians in high regard for their service and loyalty to the empire. Expectations of the sultan were that Ferid Pasha would keep Albanians loyal to the empire and mobilize them if a moment of geopolitical crisis called for it. Ferid Pasha offered the sultan his pledge of loyalty saying "An Albanian who says besa once cannot in any way break [his] promise and cannot be unfaithful [to it]." He brought to the job solid bureaucratic experience and a network of ethnic Albanian connections from a strategic and important area of the empire. As the newly appointed Grand Vizier, Ferid Pasha wanted strong precautions taken against the Young Turk movement to thwart any possible coup d'état attempts on the sultan. In February 1904, Ferid Pasha ordered Necib Efendi, mutasarrif of Elbasan to be transferred from his post, due to charges of bad morals and impotence.

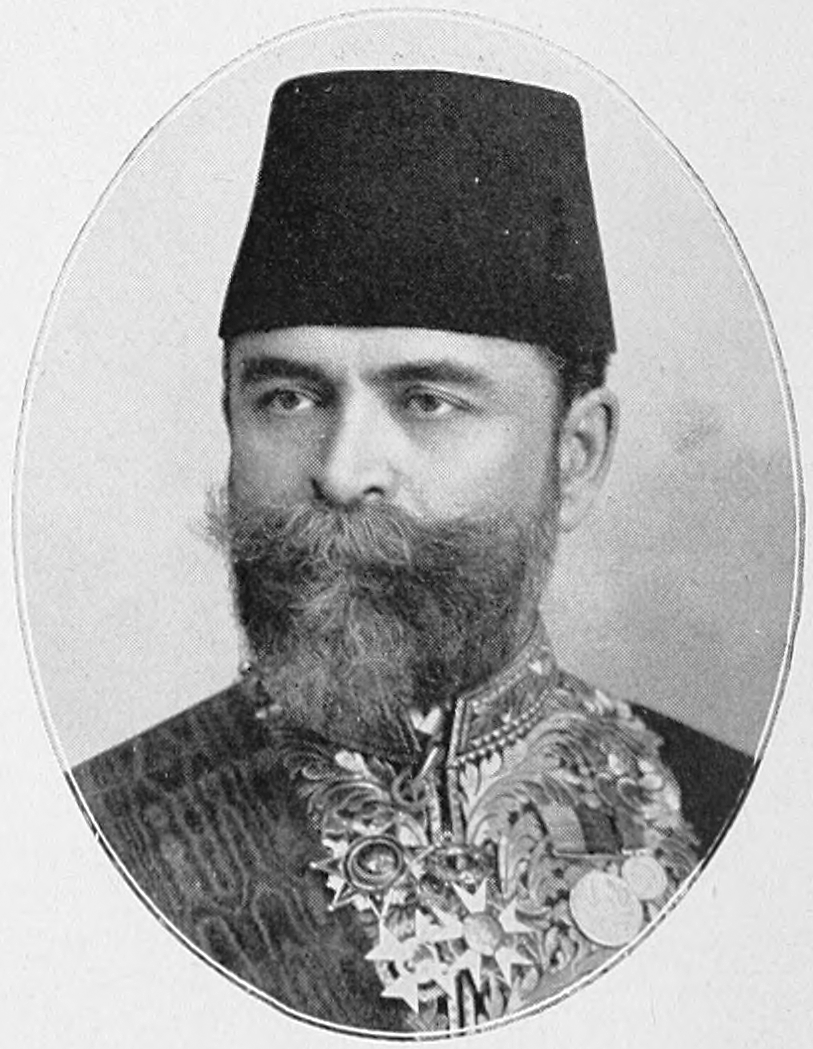
A younger portrait of Ferid Pasha.

In March 1906, a revolt broke out in Erzurum over high taxation and Ferid Pasha refused the demands of the rebels stating that taxation rates were the same throughout the empire without exceptions. Later to appease the rebels Ferid Pasha telegraphed the Muslim clergy of Erzurum that a commission would be sent to investigate and in case of an abuse of power the governor dismissed.

Geopolitics and the Albanian question were a focus of Ferid Pasha who expressed concerns during May 1906. For him, Italy aimed to turn the "Adriatic Sea into an Italian lake" expressed in part through its influence in Albania and Rome's connections with Italo-Albanians and some of their societies calling for Albanian autonomy alongside covert and overt Italian officials operating in the region. Warning Ottoman officials to be wary of activities by Italian officials in Albania, he viewed Austria-Hungary as also having its own "vexatious ideas and hopes" on Albania.

During the Young Turk Revolution (1908), the Grand Vizer's office instructed Hilmi Pasha to send an official to investigate the reason for the gathering at Firzovik and disperse the Albanian crowd without force. On 20 July, two telegrams by 194 notables from the Firzovik meeting were sent to Ferid Pasha and the Seyhulislam demanding the restoration of the constitution of 1876. The sultan sacked Ferid Pasha on 23 July 1908 and replaced him with Mehmed Said Pasha after he failed to prevent the Young Turk Revolution and keep Albanians loyal to the state of which some were involved in those events. His time as Grand Vizier for five years, six months, and eight days would be the third longest during the reign of Abdul Hamid II, representing the sultan's reliance on Albanian Muslims. By 1909, Ferid Pasha had become minister of the interior and in the Ottoman parliament defended government actions in Kosovo against criticisms from Albanian deputies on indiscriminate use of force by the Ottoman army against rebels and civilians caught in the crossfire. Ferid Pasha claimed that the Ottoman state was collecting taxes according to the law and the parliamentary exchanges received applause from deputies on each side highlighting the political polarisation of the time. In 1912, with the Albanian revolt and deteriorating situation in Kosovo, sultan Mehmed V asked Ferid Pasha to become interior minister and member of a new government.

His third son Jalaluddin Pasha married Princess Atiyetullah Khanum Efendi, the oldest daughter of Abbas II of Egypt.
