= Halil Rifat Pasha =

Grand Vizier of the Ottoman Empire from 1895 to 1901

Halil Rifat Pasha خلیل رفعت پاشا Pasha
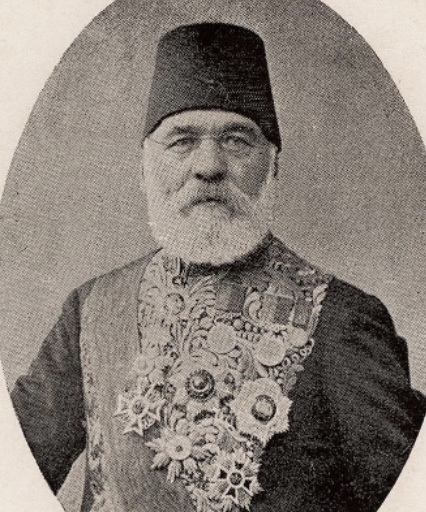

Mutasarrıf of Vidin
- In office 1882–1886

Governor of Sivas Vilayet
- In office 1886–1889

Governor of Aidin Vilayet
- In office 1889–1891
- Preceded by: Nafiz Pasha
- Succeeded by: Abdurrahman Nurettin Pasha

Governor of Manastir Vilayet
- In office 1891–1893

Grand Vizier of the Ottoman Empire
- In office 7 November 1895 – 9 November 1901
- Monarch: Abdul Hamid II
- Preceded by: Kâmil Pasha
- Succeeded by: Mehmed Said Pasha

Personal details
- Born: 1820 Serres, Sanjak of Serres, Salonica Vilayet, Ottoman Empire
- Died: 9 November 1901 (aged 80–81) Istanbul, Ottoman Empire

Halil Rifat Pasha (Ottoman Turkish: خلیل رفعت پاشا) (Modern Turkish: Halil Rıfat Paşa; 1820 (Note: According to the obituary in The Times, he was born about 1807. This would make him almost 95 years old at the time of his death. Other sources give 1820.)–9 November 1901) was an Ottoman parliamentarian and statesman during the First Constitutional Era. He furthermore served as the Grand Vizier for six years between 1895 until his death in 1901, during the late Abdul Hamid II era.

== Education ==
He was born in Serres (Serez) and received education in an Islamic type parish school in Selanik (Thessaloniki), then continued to Mekteb-i Mülkiye in Constantinople.

== Life and career ==
After his education years, he started to work as a mailing clerk in Vidin, then worked as secretary in the office of the Governor of Salonika. He advanced by degrees and was appointed to higher official positions by passage of time, including at Rustchuk. In 1882 he was appointed as mutasarrıf of Vidin, then in 1886 he was appointed as governor of Sivas, where he started a road-building programme. He was subsequently appointed governor of Aidin (1889) and later of Monastir, where he fought brigandage units which was rife in the province. He was appointed as minister of internal affairs in 1893. Then he was appointed as grand vizier in November 1895. The most important events in his era as grand vizier were the riots of Sason (in 1895) and in Crete (in 1897), as well as the Greco-Turkish War of 1897 which ended with Ottoman victory.

== Trivia ==
His motto in the road building campaign was "Any place where you can't go is not yours" (Turkish: Gidemediğin yer senin değildir.)

== See also ==
- List of Ottoman grand viziers
- Hamidian massacres

Political offices
Preceded by Kâmil Pasha	Grand Vizier of the Ottoman Empire; 7 November 1895 – 9 November 1901	Succeeded by Mehmed Said Pasha
