= Kadri Pasha =

Grand Vizier of the Ottoman Empire (1880)

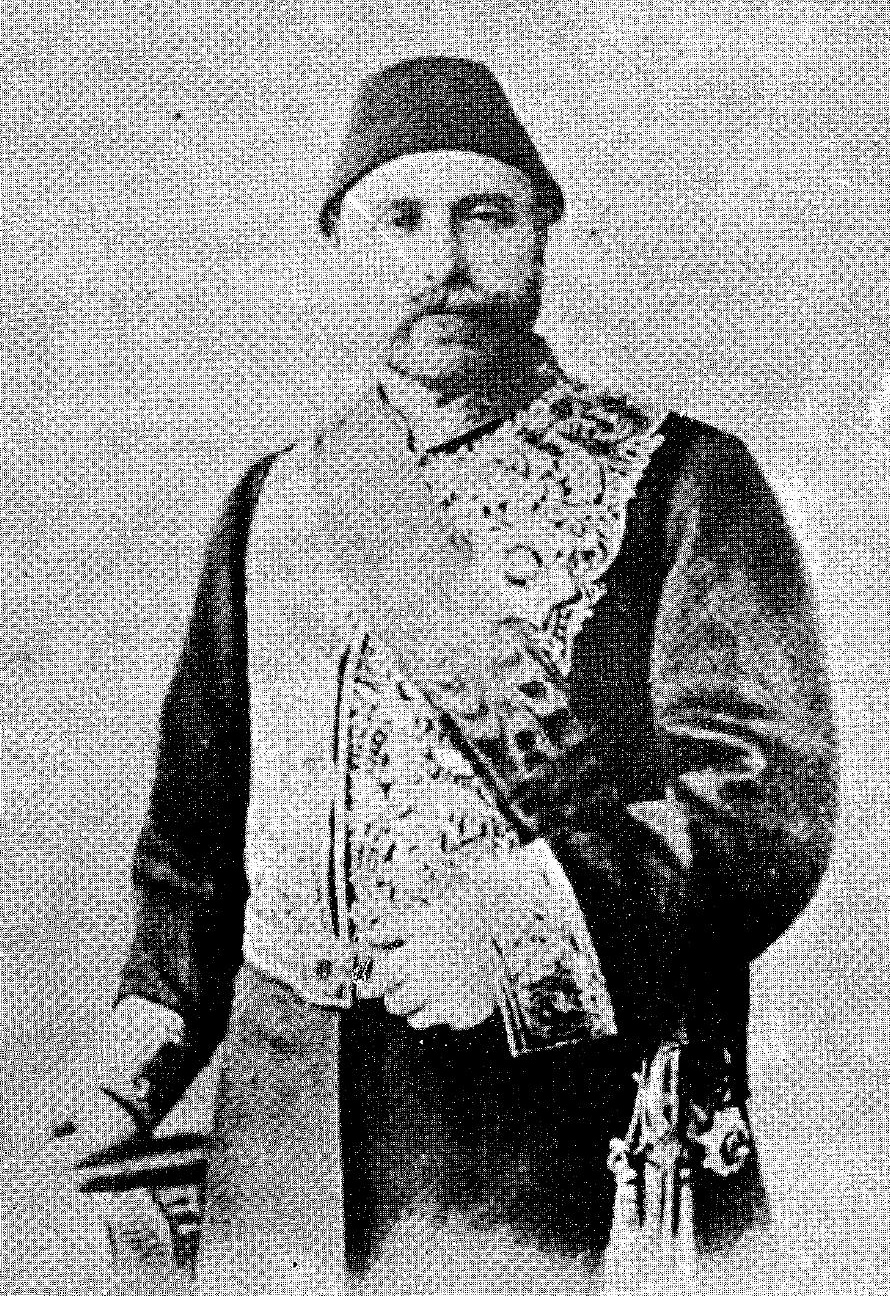
Mehmed Kadri Pasha wearing a diplomatic uniform

Mehmed Kadri Pasha (Ottoman Turkish: محمد قدری پاشا) also known as Kadri Pasha (1832 – 1884) was an Ottoman statesman and reformer. He was the Grand Vizier of the Ottoman Empire during the reign of Abdul Hamid II from 9 June 1880 to 12 September 1880. From 11 February 1876 to 4 February 1877, he was also the mayor (şehremini) of Constantinople.

== Biography ==
Kadri Pasha was born in 1832 in Aintab, and was the son of Cenanizade Ishak Pasha, who was the Governor of Cyprus. After having acquired his basic education, mastering Arabic and Persian, and studying Islamic sciences and literature in his hometown, Kadri was moved to Constantinople, where he would be further tutored in English and French, as well as modern Western sciences.

His tenure with the civil service began with a position as a population registrar in Antep, but he soon came to the attention of his superiors upon moving to Constantinople.
