= Hasan Fehmi Pasha =

Ottoman Empire politician (1836–1910)

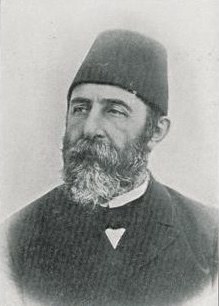

Personal details
- Born: 1836 Batum, Ottoman Empire
- Died: 1910 (aged 73–74) Istanbul, Ottoman Empire

Hasan Fehmi Pasha (1836–1910) was one of the leading Ottoman statesmen during the late Tanzimat period, who served in various governorships and juridical institutions. He was furthermore a member of the Senate, and a supporter of foreign investment, but at the same time an advocate of syndicates formed by multinational capitalists.

== Biography ==
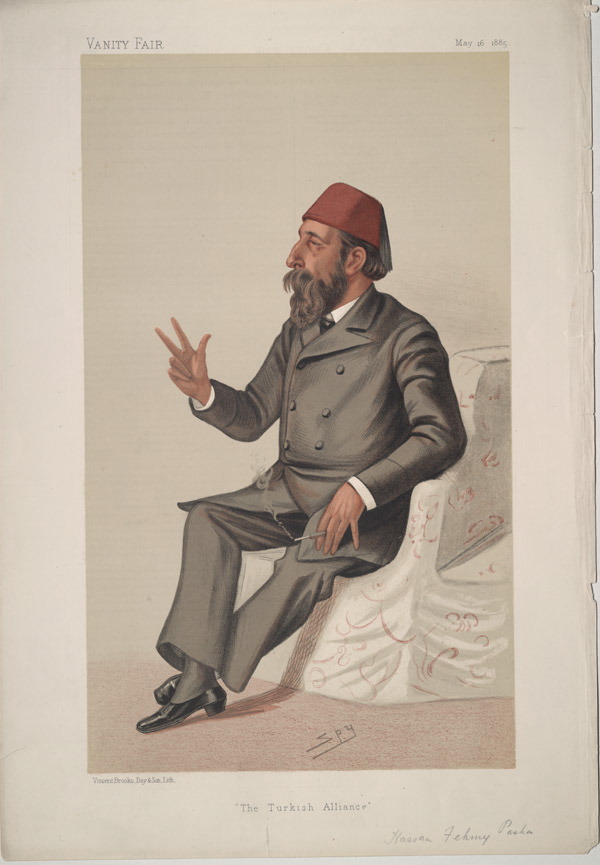
Hasan Fehmi Pasha on the cover of Vanity Fair, 16 May 1885.

Hasan Fehmi Pasha was born into a prominent wealthy family in Batum in 1836. He was of Georgian descent.

In 1883, Hasan Fehmi published a textbook titled Summary of International Law which would go on to be banned in 1894, despite receiving initial approval from Abdul Hamid II and acclaim from academics. A spy associated with the Ministry of Education flagged a section in "The Rights of States" portion of the textbook as supporting foreign intervention in domestic affairs, leading to Abdul Hamid II's ban decision.

Hasan Fehmi was associated with the Committee for Union and Progress in late 19th and early 20th century.

He became the head of the Ottoman Court of Justice in the year 1884. He was sent to various diplomatic missions in cities such as London and Rome. He became the president of the Council of State in 1907–1908. After a 3-month break, he again functioned as the president of the Council of State for one more year.

Hasan Fehmi Pasha died in Istanbul in 1910.
