= Marin Iorda =

Romanian visual artist, writer and filmmaker (1901–1972)

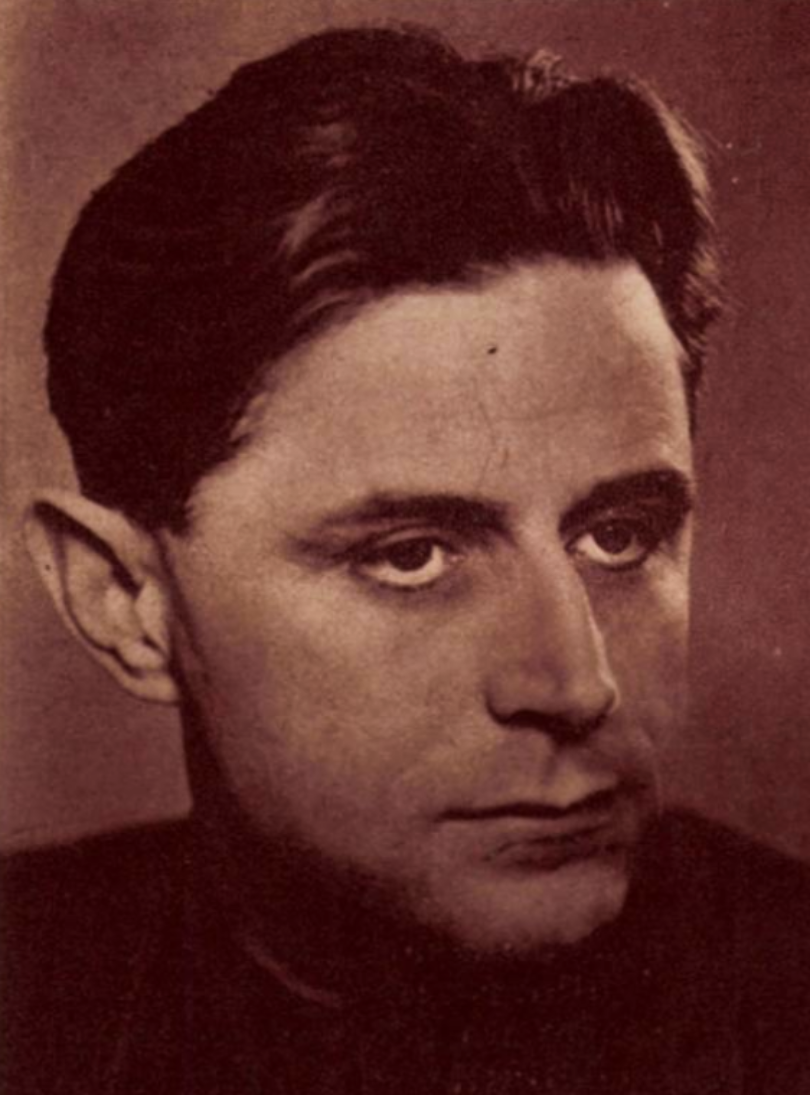
- Iorda c. 1937
- Born: Marin Iordache; 30 August 1901 Bucharest, Kingdom of Romania
- Died: 23 June 1972 (aged 70) Bucharest, Socialist Republic of Romania
- Areas: Writer, Artist
- Pseudonym: Moș Martin
- Notable works: Haplea; SOS a dispărut avionul stratosferic
- Collaborators: Constantin Costa-Foru; Victor Ion Popa; Nicolae Constantin Batzaria; Ionel Drugă
- Awards: Meritul Cultural (1947); Artist Emeritus of the Romanian People's Republic (1957)
- Spouse: Ecaterina Iorda

Marin Iorda, pen name of Marin Iordache (30 August 1901 – 23 June 1972), was a Romanian visual artist, writer, filmmaker, and theatrical director. His beginnings were as a teen-aged cartoonist, employed on Constantin Costa-Foru's magazine for youth. Specializing in line art and graphic design, then formalizing his training with courses at the Art Academy, he spent the early interwar years as a regular at various cultural magazines in Bucharest. From 1919, Iorda was also promoted and educated by the writer, cartoonist and theater producer Victor Ion Popa, who inspired him to take up stage design; they functioned for decades as a two-man team, with Iorda as the less conspicuous one. As part of his more independent ventures, in 1924 he partnered with another writer, Nicolae Constantin Batzaria, in creating a comic strip for children, called Haplea. It was highly successful, inspiring Iorda to also draw, animate and produce a 1927 Haplea film, which is the first-ever feature-length Romanian cartoon. He followed up in live action, with the 1928 silent film Așa e viața, enlisting Jean Georgescu as his aide.

From about 1930 to the 1957, Iorda was mainly employed as a stage director, dramaturge, and producer. During the early 1930s, he was in Brașov, where he founded and directed a children's theater; during his stint there, he also took up wood engraving and became noted as a glider operator for an experimental airmail service. After his theater failed, he turned to work for Radio Bucharest, writing and producing a string of radioplays, as well as directing its children's programming, and also served as editor in chief at the children's edition of Dimineața daily. Iorda's credentials as a leftist were established at around the same time, when he published novellas for grownups, noted for their anti-elitist and anti-capitalist messages; on the cusp of World War II, he was also briefly a pacifist activist.

Iorda's services were still used by the authoritarian regime formed around King Carol II and the National Renaissance Front in 1938. He returned as editor of Curentul's children's paper, and as writer of Romania's first graphic novel, which included praise of Carol. He and Popa ran the Workers' Theater on Uranus Hill, working under direct supervision by the Ministry of Labor. They were thus allowed to entertain the proletarian masses, though prevented from engaging in radical politics—a status which was also maintained throughout Ion Antonescu's Nazi-aligned dictatorship, down to 1944. During their cohabitation with the latter regime, Iorda and Popa also worked with each other on a police procedural, which was only partly filmed in 1942–1943. Upon Antonescu's fall in August 1944, Romania experienced a leftist turn, allowing the Uranus-Hill Theater to reemerge as an institution for the promotion of socialist aesthetics; also working as director for the National Theater Bucharest, Iorda reemerged as an ally of the Romanian Communist Party, and in 1945 published what may have been Romania's first socialist-realist epic.

In September 1947, Iorda was assigned by his friend Ion Pas, the titular Minister of Arts, as manager of the National Theater Iași. During his tenure, the Kingdom of Romania was formally ended, and a communist regime was proclaimed in its stead. In September 1948, Iorda was reassigned to the National Theater Craiova; while there, he embraced Marxism-Leninism and Stanislavski's system, applying both to the reinterpretation of works by classics such as Ion Luca Caragiale and Nicolae Filimon. Collaborating with various theatrical venues across the country, he was reassigned as a regular director at the Workers' Theater, and later the Bucharest Youth Theater. During his final decade, he had a comeback as a cartoonist: relaunching Haplea alongside writer Tudor Mușatescu, in a "re-educated" version, he also presented his lifelong drawings in various art shows.

== Biography ==
=== Early life ===
The future "Marin Iorda" was born in Bucharest, capital of the Romanian Kingdom, on 30 August 1901; his parents were Constantin and Comana Iordache, who, by his own testimony, lived on "some godforsaken street on the outskirts". In 1912, the boy made his way into a cinema, and was fascinated by the spectacle, later skipping school, and braving increasingly serious punishments by his family, to see productions starring Charles Prince and Max Linder. Both parents wanted him to train for a career in the Romanian Land Forces or in the Orthodox Church. Marin disliked these options, and eventually ran away from home, discovering an interest in painting. His first notable employment was as a cartoonist (as well as proofreader and occasional writer) for the youth magazine Revista Copiilor și Tinerimii, founded by Constantin Costa-Foru. While literary history records this debut as occurring in 1919, Iorda himself claimed that he had begun working there during World War I, and recalled his participation in staff meetings with literary celebrities such as Ioan Slavici and Gala Galaction. This period saw him drawing Slavici's portrait.

Literary critic Carol Isac notes that Revista Copiilor și Tinerimii allowed Iordache to experiment in the new field of "children's journalism". Writer Miron Radu Paraschivescu, who grew up reading Costa-Foru's publication, reserved praise for Iorda's "countless illustrations", done in a style that (he argued) was unique in Romanian art, with line art that is "somewhere between branch and snake". He saw Iorda as Romania's own Toulouse-Lautrec, and as someone born to do animation. As the war ended, Iordache moved on to jobs at Adevărul Literar și Artistic and Rampa, where he also specialized in graphic design for advertising content; for a while, he worked in a workshop that put out marketing content. He entered the Bucharest Art Academy upon passing his entry exam in 1919. Though still focused on graphic art, his training was guided by sculptors Dimitrie Paciurea and Frederic Storck. Curator Eugenia Antonescu sees him as excelling as a portraitist and caricaturist, with sketches that depicted a variety of human faces—from anonymous Romanian peasants to politicians such as Marcel Cachin and writers such as Mihail Sorbul. He remained attached to drawing and watercolor in a miniature style, producing only a few easel paintings.

When Iorda began writing for children, it was after being encouraged to do so by a more established author and illustrator, Victor Ion Popa. As he himself put it: "I first met Victor Ion Popa in the winter of 1919. From that first moment, he viewed me as his younger brother. He taught me lots of things; I worked side by side with him as he was rehearsing, designing sets or costumes, or trying on makeup." During the early months of 1922, Popa attracted his young acolyte into the "Salon of Humorists", which he had founded. Before it went down in 1928, the Salon was also frequented by artists such as Ion Valentin Anestin, Jacques Kapralik, Sigismund Maur, and Iosif Ross. Iorda recalls having accompanied Popa on commissions for drawing caricatures of politicians (usually done from live sittings); in 1925, the two of them worked together on a production of The Mandrake, by Niccolò Machiavelli, during which Popa allowed him full liberty to work on the set design, including for hand-painting the actual props.

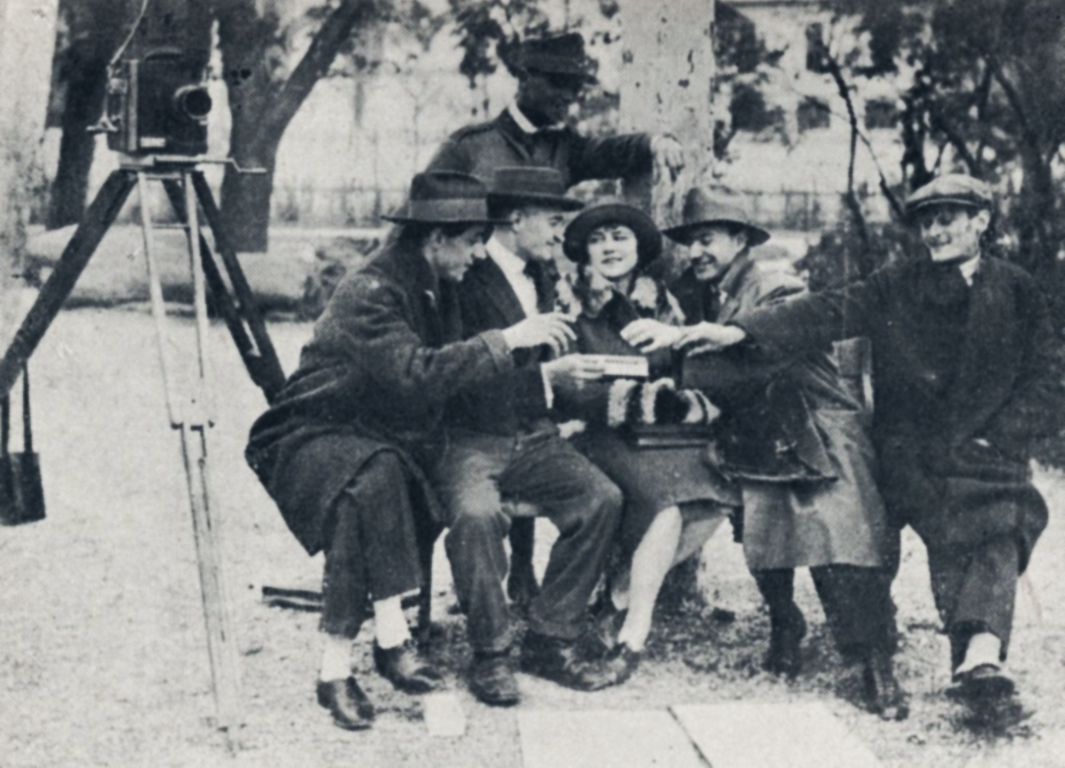
Iorda (seated first from the left) with silent film star Pola Illéry and film critic Marcel Blossoms. Shot between takes for an unspecified film at Grădina Icoanei of Bucharest, May 1928

Dramatist Sarina Cassvan, who worked with both Popa and Iorda, recalls that the latter "cared not for the benefits of publicity", maintaining a low profile in Popa's shadow. This, she notes, led many to ignore his multilateral talents—the fact that "he knew everything, and he did everything too." She recalls that he went as far as to erect the props using "the most astounding materials", and that he once crafted a single shoe, just to prove to himself that he could. In 1924, alongside the newspaper editor Nicolae Constantin Batzaria, Iorda created Haplea. This comic strip, purportedly Romania's first ongoing series, greatly contributed to his fame. Thousands of young readers were regular subscribers, and many of them wrote letters to Haplea, thinking that he was a real-life person; Iorda would maintain the illusion by replying back in-character.

Iorda also debuted in Romanian cinema with a 1927 Haplea film—locally famous as the first-ever feature-length Romanian cartoon. He could find no financing for this project, and consequently created it entirely on his own, from script to production, and even to janitorial work on the studio; the only outside help was from cameraman Eftimie Vasilescu, who helped him procure and edit the film stock. The end product, which only ran at cinemas in Bucharest and Brașov, had 400 meters (or 440 yards) of film, comprising some thousands of individual drawings. During Haplea's production, he had interrupted himself to visit Gabriel Rosca and his crew, who were filming the silent film Le Chemin de la rémission in the nearby Cișmigiu Gardens, and who gave him tips about camera work.

=== Brașov and late interwar ===
Using Haplea as his training in animation, Iorda was later inspired to create and debut his own cartoon character, Guguță. He also went on to write, direct and produce the 1928 live action, Așa e viața ("Such is Life"). He had co-written the screenplay with Jean Georgescu, and employed mime artists from Georgescu's private school of acting. As a short film in the burlesque genre, it remains Iorda's second and last directorial credit in cinema. His steady contribution in the press now included works in the reportage and memoir genres, as well as samples of theater, film and art criticism—favorite venues included Adevărul, Curentul, Cuvântul Liber, Dimineața, Timpul, and Vremea. In the 1930s, his interests focused on theatrical ventures, and he joined Popa as a stage designer and director of plays.

In 1933 (or, by some other accounts, in 1936), Iorda founded a children's amateur theater at Brașov. His partner in this venture was the local teacher-activist Valeria Căliman, who was close to the National Peasants' Party leadership. The company was mainly dedicated to showcasing Popa's plays, and had the author arriving in at the premieres, to provide encouragement and some material aid. During his time in Brașov, Iorda produced 13 woodcuts of the surrounding cityscape, including images of the Black Church, the St. Nicholas Church, and Piața Sfatului. Some of his images of local life, including one of women from Șcheii Brașovului, were carried in the local magazine, Brașovul Literar, which in May 1934 also gave exposure to his exhibit of caricatures, arranged by ASTRA Society. The cartoonist was by then also an aviation enthusiast, and is said to have flown his own glider. By some accounts, in October 1935 he established the first airmail service from Brașov to Bucharest, which also relied on a sailplane. This account is partly contradicted by aviator Valentin Popescu, who recalled that he himself was steering the glider for a one-time demonstration—and that Iorda, as his only passenger, helped by carrying the bags of mail to the runway.

The Brașov enterprise was overall controversial: Curentul alleged in January 1938 that Iorda had defrauded the state to the tune of 300,000 lei, requesting state funds for a theatrical company that did not actually exist and for a guide book that he never published. Several of these claims were retracted the following month, with the newspaper commending Iorda for his work in outbidding efforts by the ethnic minorities, and explaining that the allegations came from a frustrated member of his crew. Iorda himself would spend the rest of his life campaigning for the creation of a larger, national-level and modern-equipped, theatrical institution for children. For some two years of the interwar, he produced and voiced Ora Copiilor, a children-oriented program on Radio Bucharest. This period also marked his beginnings as a dramatist—including as an author of radioplays, over thirty of which were written in collaboration with Popa. As noted decades later by literary historian Florin Faifer, he himself remains an "almost insignificant" presence in that field, only individualized by a "certain liveliness" of his speech. In November 1938, Radio Bucharest premiered his "fresco" of Alexandru Lăpușneanu's second reign in Moldavia. It was reportedly a "true hit", prompting the same company to use him as a dramaturge. In December 1937, he released an adapted, voice-only version of Ion Luca Caragiale's A Stormy Night.

Iorda also worked with people's theaters, releasing in 1938 his own comedy, Haplea la stăpân ("Haplea as a Servant"). The published it with his own minutely detailed illustrations and notes. Faifer suggests that Iorda was much more gifted in his prose works for children—beginning with the 1937 novel Meșterul Strică ("Handyman-Wrecker") and the 1938 collection Poveștile unchiului meu ("My Uncle's Yarns"). Iorda also targeted a grown-up audience with a collection of satirical novellas, issued in 1937 as Funeralii naționale ("State Funeral"). These are seen by Isac as depicting a "Bucharest that is hard-pressed into adopting superficial luxuries to hide its tragic uncertainty." As noted by Faifer, they mainly target the upper classes for their avarice, crudeness, and hypocrisy, while upholding the interest of the underclass and showing social marginals as the innocent victims of a system that despises them. The same critic praises Iorda for his deadpan delivery, which increases "the grotesque's effectiveness."

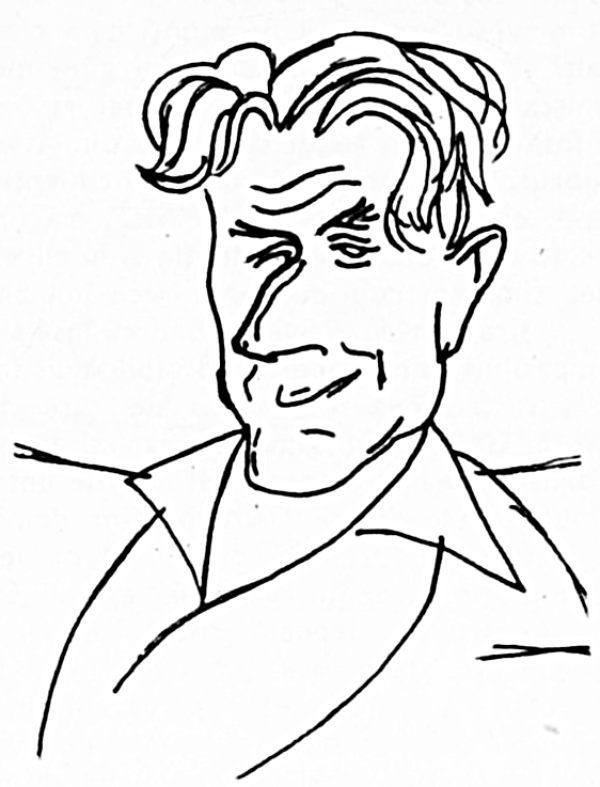
Caricature of Iorda, done by his friend Victor Ion Popa

Iorda had by then returned to Bucharest, and between January 1937 and May 1938, was editor of Dimineața's children's supplement; he was occasionally using another pen name, "Moș Martin". He was briefly involved with the global pacifist movement, "manifest[ing] his worries as to Europe's destiny under the heavy clouds of war", and in 1938 attended a Universal Peace Congress in Brussels, as a Romanian delegate. Following a self-coup, King Carol II had passed an authoritarian constitution, leading to the establishment of a National Renaissance Front as the sole legal party. Both Iorda and Popa remained active in literary and theatrical life under this new regime. In December 1938, they established Muncă și Voe Bună Theater (TMVB) on Uranus Hill, as a subsidiary of the Ministry of Labor and of the Muncă și Voe Bună leisure service. It provided regular entertainment to the Romanian proletariat—as reported in 1969 by Iorda, they were seeking to create a venue for showcasing "real life", including when it came to children's plays (most of which were initially texts by Iorda). Also according to Iorda, the venue had to battle state censorship, which prevented it from producing a version of Maxim Gorky's Lower Depths. He was allowed to showcase his own texts, which included, by mid-1939, Haplea la stăpân, Neață și Nătăfleață la circ ("Willy and Nilly at the Circus"), Scaunul năsdrăvan ("The Mischievous Chair", co-written by I. Iliescu), as well as his adaptation from Marie of Romania's story, Ușa fermecată ("The Enchanted Door").

=== World War II ===
For most of World War II (1939–1944), Iorda was charged with putting out Curentul's supplement for children, called Curentul Copiilor. Here, he continued to experiment with the comic-strip format, but as a writer. He produced the script to an adventure series with realistic drawings by Ionel Drugă, Romania's first comic in a non-caricaturesque style, and effectively the first Romanian graphic novel (as any previous examples were copied under syndication from American newspapers). Called SOS a dispărut avionul stratosferic ("Mayday We're Missing a Stratospheric Airplane"), it had scientists from the IAR factories flying exploratory missions above the Southern Hemisphere. The "Silver Island", discovered by them after several mishaps, is then made into a personal possession of King Carol's. Iorda also contributed to army entertainment, with a series of comedy plays published in 1940 as Șezători ostășești ("Sit-downs for Soldiers"). In mid-January 1940, another one of his radioplays, depicting events from Stephen the Great's reign, was performed on national radio by the Carlist regime's youth organization, Straja Țării. He was showcased at the Alhambra with another comedy, Cine-i mai prost? ("Who's Stupider?"), performed as part of the May Day festivities.

During the episodic National Legionary State, established by the Iron Guard upon Carol's ouster, the TMVB went as "Luptă și Lumină" Theater. It opened its new season in November 1940 with several plays, premiering Iorda's Lada cu minuni ("A Crate of Wonders"). Under Ion Antonescu's dictatorial regime (1941–1944), Popa endured as chairman of the TMVB, now generally known as "Muncă și Lumină", with Iorda as his main stage director. Together, the two men are credited as authors of a "social comedy" and "apology of honest work", called 10.000.000 ("10 Million"). Iorda later revealed that the text was almost entirely his, but that he insisted Popa share writing credits for his quick copy editing; the play was then released with a royalty-free license, as the theater could not afford to pay them on each staging. 10.000.000 was produced by the writers themselves, at Muncă și Lumină, during 1941–1942.

In February 1943, Muncă și Lumină took up Iorda's whodunit, Stai că trag! ("Stop or I'll Shoot!"), with Raluca Zamfirescu in a lead role. Timpul recommended it as an "interesting play" which "will captivate spectator from the first line and down to the last one." He was then also tasked with producing Romanian versions of Jean-François Regnard's Residuary Legatee and Boris Borozanov's Tailor Prince, as well as a "patriotic play" by Radu Ionescu and Nicolae Neamțu-Ottonel, called Cazemata voluntarilor ("Volunteers' Pillbox"). He was employed as a teacher at the company's "Workers' Conservatory", which in July 1943 used another one of his own plays, O casă nobilă ("A Noble House"), for the graduation exam. Iorda also wished to return with a piece set during the Phanariote era in Bucharest, more specifically localized during the reign of John Caradja; it was called Cîntec de inimă albastră ("Singing the Blues"). While some sources suggest that it was penned in 1940, it was only submitted to Popa in 1943. Cîntec took his critique of the upper classes to the realm of farce, being heavily inspired by Carlo Goldoni and the commedia dell'arte. Popa was enthusiastic, and saw Maria Tănase as perfect for the lead role, in travesti. She declined the offer, as she was already booked up as a chanteuse. The work was then shelved after the press commented on it being "too leftist".

Theatrical historian Ioan Massoff observes that the company's reputation had by then been unwittingly harmed by the Ministry of Labor, which still supervised Popa's activities. Taking its cue from Nazi racial policies, it put up posters barring Jews from viewing any shows. Iorda, who single-handedly managed the production of children's plays by Muncă și Lumină, also returned to publishing on his own. In 1942, he issued an adventure and verse novel titled Guguță în vacanță ("Guguță on Holiday"). From 1941, he and Eftimie Vasilescu were working on another film project, Focuri sub zăpadă ("Fires under the Snow"). It was done from Popa's script, reportedly written during a single night, with scenes being sporadically shot on location (mainly around Zărnești, Otopeni and Snagov) during early 1942, and again in late 1943. Sponsors pulled out shortly after, and only some scenes survive. If finished, it would have been the second-ever Romanian police procedural, after Jean Mihail's Trenul fantomă of 1933. Critic B. T. Rîpeanu, who watched the unedited footage, argues that it was masterfully shot, but also that the acting was largely compromised by "theatrical tics", and that the film was misleading in its favorable treatment of the upper classes.

The political climate was changed by an anti-fascist coup in August 1944, which also sent the country on a left-wing trajectory, ending with the establishment of a communist regime in late 1947 (itself lasting to 1989). Immediately after Antonescu's fall, Iorda became a regular contributor to Sergiu Milorian's satirical magazine, Papagalul, which was connected to the Romanian Social Democratic Party (PSDR). In 1944–1945, he served as an adviser in the Ministry of Arts, and in parallel was stage director at the National Theater Bucharest. The latter's main building had been destroyed during a German retaliatory air-raid, and Iorda worked for the secondary stage, at Saint Sava National College. He directed Elena Galaction and Emil Botta in a production of Margaret Kennedy's Escape Me Never; it and all other Saint Sava productions were received with apathy by theatergoers, generating frustration among the cast.

Iorda himself moved on soon after. On Christmas Day 1944, Muncă și Lumină, which had been reestablished as the "Workers' Theater", ran his version of Pinocchio, set to music by Eugeniu Micu. On 27 May 1945, he took part in the PSDR festivity commemorating philosopher Constantin Dobrogeanu Gherea: the Minister of Education, Ștefan Voitec, gave an introductory lecture, after which Iorda read excerpts from Gherea's works. From 1946, he was stage director of the Workers' Theater. He began by directing a version of Scapin the Schemer (starring George Proca and Mitzura Arghezi), as well as a number of plays by Marin Grigorescu (a typesetter who only wrote in his spare time) and by the PSDR-affiliated Ion Pas. He was also a director for his own play O fată din popor ("A Regular Girl"), with Sereda Sorbul in the title role. As noted by chronicler Șerban Cioculescu, it revealed Iorda as an "ingenious auteur", who was intensely applauded by his working-class public. In October 1945, the actress and director created a special show for the staff of Luther Brewery in northern Bucharest.

=== Communist turn ===
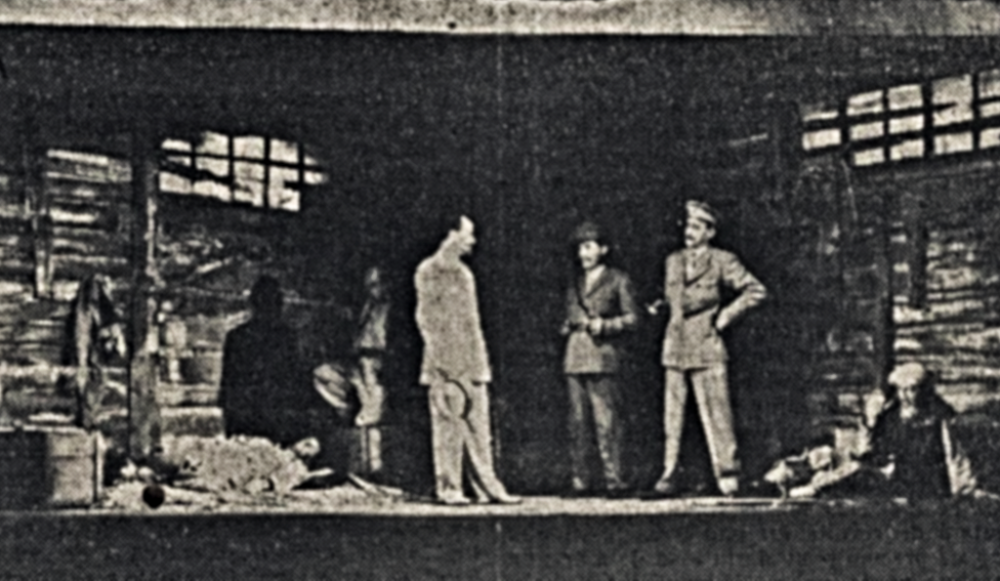
Scene from Thai Dian Chun's South of the 38th Parallel, as directed by Iorda for the Workers' Theater

Iorda aspired to recognition as a socialist writer with another novel, appearing in 1945 Oameni în cătușe de aur ("Men in Gilded Handcuffs"). It admonishes the upper strata of the peasantry, whom Iorda calls surtucari ("jacket-wearers"), and depicts the sharecroppers as natural allies of the Romanian Communist Party. According to Faifer, the narrative is "massive and rather prolix", "of an ominous radicalism"; scholar Cosmin Borza sees it as Romania's "first socialist-realist novel". 10.000.000 continued to be performed in theaters after the regime change, although, as Massoff argues, its message was not entirely "social"—the main protagonist, after winning the lottery, strives to become an industrial capitalist. In 1946, Iorda also issued his work of popular science, De la cal la cal-vapor ("From Horse to Horsepower"), and, in 1947, published another contribution in the youth novel genre, called Un cățel, un purcel și-un băiețel ("Doggy, Piggy and a Laddie"). He was for a while involved with Teatrul Mic of Bucharest, directing a version of Dezső Szomory's Dr Alice Brönte (adapted into Romanian by Isaia Răcăciuni). A freak fire destroyed all the props while the company was touring in 1946. In tandem, the Workers' Theater was running Jerome K. Jerome's The Passing of the Third Floor Back, from a translation by Profira Sadoveanu—and with Iorda as director.

Iorda was for a while sole manager of the Workers' Theater. He submitted his resignation from that institution in October 1946, but his contract was only severed in late March 1947, when Iosif Ligeti took over the position. He had remained involved with the "Workers' Conservatory", where he led the teaching department of "theatrical technique". He also collaborated with the newly established "Bucharest People's Theater", joining its leadership committee alongside N. D. Cocea, Jules Cazaban, and Marcel Breslașu. Here, he produced Popa's comedy Take, Ianke și Cadîr. The terminally ill author was convinced that the play would flop, as it had in the interwar, but was persuaded by Iorda to give his blessing. As many as 300 lines were removed from the text, to improve its flow, and the play was reportedly successful with the public; Popa did not live to see this happen. In addition, Iorda was involved with the Mogador Cinema-Theater, which had him directing John Millington Synge's Playboy of the Western World (translated into Romanian by Petru Comarnescu). In 1947, he had begun producing the children's film Cetatea fermecată ("Enchanted Citadel")—which was nearly completed when he ran out of funds.

In August 1947, King Michael I was presented by Pas, the Arts Minister, with a list of proposals for induction into Meritul Cultural. As a result of this, Iorda received that decoration in the first-class category. He was promoted in September, when Pas sent him to take over as chairman of the National Theater Iași (TNI). As Iorda recalled later, he was accompanied there by fellow cultural functionaries Ștefan Tita and Nicolae Kirițescu, and had his credentials validated by novelist Ionel Teodoreanu. The new season opened on 25 October 1947, premiering Mușcata din fereastră—another play by the late Popa, with Iorda providing the stage direction. This time, Iorda sought to "respect the primacy of the text", personally coaching the actors to make sure that no intended meaning was lost. The company then ran Molière's School for Wives, Yevgeny Petrov's Island of Peace, Eugène Scribe's Glass of Water, and Ilya Ehrenburg's Lion in the Square—all of which had Iorda as director. He subsequently dedicated himself to the project of democratizing theater-going, and, in his own words, experienced "great and durable artistic accomplishments." His participation in the cultural life of Iași saw him embarking on various other collaborations: on International Workers' Day 1948, his play Pitpalacul ("The Quail") was performed by both the TNI crew and the local troupe of the People's Theater. It was an endorsement of collectivization in agriculture, claiming to show the "true face" of chiaburi enemies. In June, his one-act play, Ucenicul, was being performed by an amateur troupe in Sibiu County.

Iorda's tenure ended on 21 September 1948, when he was moved to the National Theater Craiova. At the time, he was also under contract with Ploiești Theater. Here, alongside Mia Steriade, he produced Gorky's Enemies. Returning to Craiova in early 1949, he embraced Marxist-Leninism in his reinterpretation of Caragiale's O scrisoare pierdută. During a "creative session" with the agitprop department in Dolj Region, he spoke about the text as an anti-bourgeois fable, declaring that this had been obscured by "the bourgeois theatrologists" of the Kingdom era. Also then, he joined other authors in establishing a Craiova branch of the new Writers' Union of Romania (USR), serving on its leadership committee alongside peasant Crăciun Fotache. Its paper Caetul Literar hosted his poem about the communist hero Vasile Roaită, while "workers' artistic teams" took his Pitpalacul into Dolj's countryside, to propagandize among the landless peasants. In 1949–1950, Iorda was directing at the new State Theaters in Bacău and Reșița.

Iorda was afterwards stage director at the Workers' Theater (1950–1957), but left Bucharest for some other engagements. He returned to Bacău in mid-1951, directing Lev Sheinin's Deadly Inheritance. Early in 1952, he directed his Workers' Theater actors for a production of South of the 38th Parallel, a Stalinist and anti-war play by the Soviet Korean Thai Dian Chun. In early 1953, he was under contract with Maria Filotti Theater of Brăila, working on productions of plays by Tudor Șoimaru and Abdulla Qahhor. The following year, he had formed an artistic brigade, with which he was touring Bucharest's factories. Iorda worked with Șoimaru on adapting Nicolae Filimon's classic novel, Ciocoii vechi și noi, which premiered at the TNI in 1955. He himself was praised by reviewer Paul Costin for his directorial notes, in which he had revealed his interest in using the play for the "historical condemnation" of boyardom. With a parallel conference, Iorda explained that he had studied Stanislavski's system, which had informed his production of Șoimaru's play. In November of the following year, Bacău's theater again hosted him, this time with a premiere of Alexander Stein's Personal Affair.

=== Final activities ===
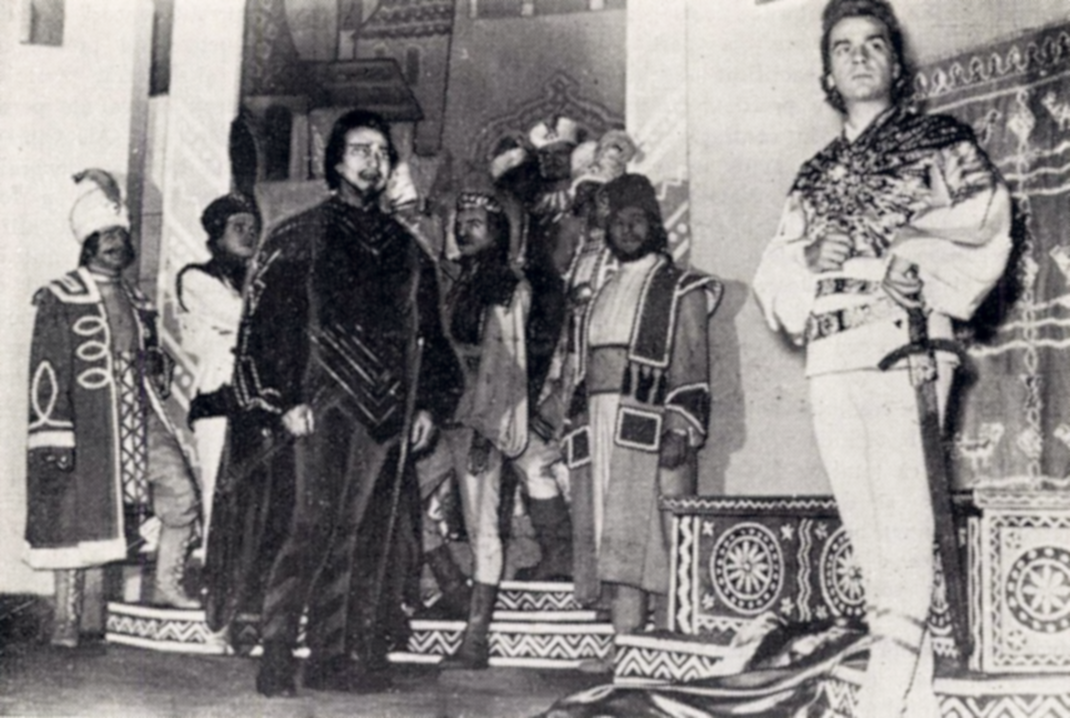
Scene from Înșir'te mărgărite in Iorda's 1958 version, with Al. Ciprian as Făt-Frumos

In his fifties, Iorda was making returns as a theater critic. One such event took place in May 1956, during a time when communist authorities were trying out de-Stalinization. With an article in Contemporanul, he defended his colleague Sică Alexandrescu, who still followed the standards of Zhdanovism, against young voices who declared Alexandrescu's shows to be "stale", and who were protected by communist official Paul Cornea. In 1957, Teatrul magazine hosted his remarks on Val Mugur's version of Romeo and Juliet. At the Workers' Theater, which had relocated to Giulești, Iorda himself directed a version of Liviu Rebreanu's Plicul in 1957. It was welcomed by critic Ștefan Augustin Doinaș, who was impressed by his managing to convey the similarities and differences between Rebreanu's bitter work and that of Caragiale, his more lighthearted predecessor and model. Around the same time, he produced Branislav Nušić's Ph. D., which received a lukewarm review from columnist Radu Popescu. According to the latter, Iorda had a "certain density" to his comedy, but had overdone his contribution, to the point where he made Nušić look "trite".

Iorda still received official accolades for his contribution on that stage, being one of the company fellows who were proclaimed "Artists Emeriti of the Romanian People's Republic" in September 1957. His final regular employment was at the Bucharest Youth Theater, whose stage director he was between 1957 and 1961. His early work there included a version of Victor Eftimiu's fairy-tale play, Înșir'te mărgărite—panned by critic Florian Potra as uncharacteristically bad for Iorda's proven talents, with "not one moment of poetry". Potra argued that the director had turned into a "shy little boy", who did not dare engage his audience's "zest for dreaming". Another theatrical reviewer, Mircea Avram, chided the Maria Filotti company for its attempt to stage one of Iorda's earlier plays, Pisicuța ("Kitten"), which Avram deemed "petty bourgeois" and "vulgar". He was instead applauded in early 1958, when he directed the same troupe for performances of George Mihail Zamfirescu's Domnișoara Nastasia.

In old age, Iorda still found praise among the community of writers, with communist playwright Aurel Baranga suggesting that he was something of a "weird inventor" in Romanian art and letters. In 1965, he briefly reentered the public eye with a well-received retrospective of his contribution as a graphic artist. Two years later, another such show opened in Bacău, to critical acclaim. In 1968, a new Salon of Humorists was hosted by the Romanian Atheneum, and Iorda participated with caricatures—described by Comarnescu as "charming images." Iorda's Funeralii naționale stories were reissued in 1969 under a new title, that of Noapte de cloroform ("Chloroform Night").

Iorda reprised Haplea in Arici Pogonici magazine, with Tudor Mușatescu as his new writer; the character was proudly introduced as "re-educated", as befitting the standards of a communized Romania. These contributions also formed the basis of two final Haplea volumes, appearing at Editura Ion Creangă in 1970 and 1971, respectively; Cîntec de inimă albastră was finally performed on various stages in the late 1960s and throughout the '70s. One of Iorda's final activities was as a member of Mușatescu's own circle of humorists, where he was colleagues with Dan Deșliu and Neagu Rădulescu. The cartoonist-writer died in his native Bucharest on 23 June 1972, in what obituaries penned by his family and the USR described as "tragic" and "sudden" circumstances. His widow Ecaterina organized his funeral, held at Sfînta Vineri Cemetery on 26 June.

== Legacy ==
In August 1972, a notebook-series put out by Bacău's theater featured Iorda's essay on "two dastardly devils" of the Romanian dramatic profession—Radu Beligan and Fory Etterle. In November, Giulești Workers' Theater displayed 26 of his "drawings on wood", which had never been featured in any previous retrospective. A month later, Sarina Cassvan urged publishing houses to reconsider reprinting his stories, and thus "retrieve from oblivion this unique volume by a man who was himself unique with his delicate nature, his modesty, and his love for the muses." A definitive collection appeared in 1973. As noted in 1983 by Isac:

for more than ten years, [Iorda has been] a memory that is more and more obscured by neglect. Which is a shame, since this man has planted only flowers and smiles along the path of several generations of readers.

Haplea continued to appear in comic strips after the Romanian Revolution of 1989: in 2019, Viorel Pârligras was reusing the character in strips drawn for a Craiova newspaper. In 2014, Iorda's original strips were showcased as part of an exhibit curated by Craiova Art Museum in Calafat. This institution thus recognized him as "one of the most important names" in the genre as it had developed locally.
