= Romanian animation =

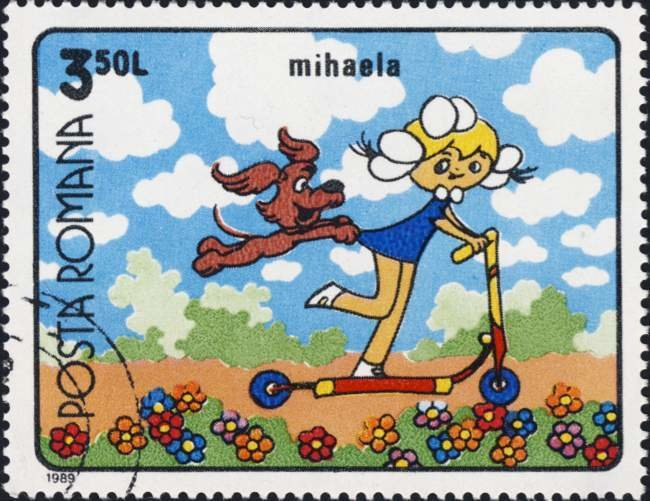
Mihaela and Azorel is one of the most well-known Romanian animated series of all time.

Romanian animation refers to animation made in Romania or by Romanian animators. Romania's animation sector dates back to the 1920s and has been influenced by many historical periods in Romanian history, including World War II, the socialist period, and contemporary events. Romania's animation industry, which includes films, television series, and video games, has been part of Romanian culture for over a century and occasionally finds success outside of Romania as well.

As everywhere else in the world, Romanian animated film was born out of the development of journalistic graphics and its natural tendency to push boundaries through the animation of images. Most of Romania's first animated film creators came from the world of cartoonists, with journalistic graphics representing the first school where Romanian animators were trained.

Most were influenced by the aesthetic ideal of American and French studios, often "stealing the trade" after watching their productions at the cinema.

== History ==
=== Origins (1920–1948) ===
The first Romanian film animation was Păcală în Lună by Aurel Petrescu (5 April 1920). Ion Popescu-Gopo is the founder of the modern Romanian cartoon school.

The early days of Romanian animation developed in completely unsuitable, purely artisanal conditions, unlike in the West, where there was a real industry for the production of animated films. This fact, along with the lack of distribution, unfair competition from foreign animations, lack of personnel, and the advent of sound, led to the relative marginalization and then disappearance of domestic animated films in the 1930s.

The most prolific cartoonist was Aurel Petrescu, with 11 cartoons confirmed by the press of the time and over 70 other animations, most of them commercials. He had the courage to continue production in the sound era, probably copying the tracks of foreign films.

The first Romanian animated film was "Păcală în lună" by Aurel Petrescu, premiered on 5 April 1920. (Cinematographic Dictionary - Cornel Cristian and Bujor T. Râpeanu - 1974, p. 23)

The first cartoon preserved in the national archive is called Haplea and was created by Marin Iorda in 1927, based on a similar character in his cartoons. The difficulties that arose during and after its production led Iorda to abandon any plans for a sequel. In 1936, he only made some animated diagrams for Professor Dimitrie Gusti's film, which was presented at the Romanian pavilion of the International Exhibition in Paris the following year.

== Styles ==
Throughout the history of Romanian animation, different animation techniques have been used.

- Traditional animation: Originally used by Romanian animators in the 1920s and continued to be used throughout the socialist period.
- Stop motion: An animation technique that emerged in the 1950s, used for satirical and fictionalized storytelling. Popular subgenres included claymation, cutout animation, Brickfilm and model animation.
- Rotoscope: An animation technique that animators use to trace over live-action footages, frame by frame, to produce realistic action. Rotoscoping was popularized in Romania by the Gopo's Little Man series of films created by Ion Popescu-Gopo.
- Computer animation: An animation subgenre that utilizes CGI to create moving pictures in place of more traditional methods. CGI animations became popular around the time of the Romanian revolution with films like Maria, Mirabela in Tranzistoria. Both 2D and 3D animation techniques are utilized.

== Industry ==
=== Animation studios ===
Major animation studios in Romania include Animafilm, founded in Bucharest in 1964 by Ion Popescu-Gopo. The studio served as the center of Romanian animation during the socialist period, producing an estimated 1200 cartoons, 7 feature films and 15 series. Some of Animafilm's most successful works include Mihaela (1968–1983), Miaunel and Bălănel (1974–1982), and the Gopo's Little Man film series. After the fall of communism in Romania, Animafilm became a joint stock corporation, and was privatized in 2006.

Another prominent Romanian animation studio is the Transylvanian Legendarium Animation Studio, based in Odorheiu Secuiesc. Legendarium uses cutting-edge animation technology and makes projects in both 3D Maya and 2D frame-by-frame animation techniques. The studio opened in 2012 and has since won awards at film festivals in Hungary, India, and the United States.

=== University programs ===
The National University of Theatre and Film "I.L. Caragiale" is considered Romania's flagship institution for animation education. It is the only university in Romania with an accredited Master's and Bachelor's Animation programs. The university's facilities include production studios for motion capture and stop motion animation, a computer graphics studio, and other high-tech animation equipment. The program also hosts various projects, including a worldbuilding project and a mural painting project.

While not exclusively an animation school, the Graphics Department at the George Enescu National University of Arts has collaborated with Animafilm on various projects and has been featured at the Animafantasia animated film festival in Iași.

=== Animation societies ===
The Animest Association works to develop Romanian animation through "cultural events, educational programs, professional initiatives and international projects." It has hosted the Animest International Animation Film Festival in Bucharest annually since 2006, as well as projects like Minimest, dedicated to children's animation; Animation Incubator, focused on high school students; and Animest Together, which is aimed at improving accessibility and raising awareness for "audiences with diverse abilities." The association has also hosted events in Chișinău, Moldova.

The Sisterhood of Young Animation Auteurs (SYAA) aims to tackle the gender imbalance in the Romanian animation industry and provide support and resources for female animators. Founded in 2021, SYAA hosts lectures, presentations, workshops, screenings and networking events, and helps its members achieve success with their projects both inside and outside Romania.

The Central and Eastern Europe Animation association (CEE), while not being exclusively Romanian, frequently works with and features Romanian studios, producers and filmmakers. Its member studios include Romanian studios Tangaj, Kinotopia, Legendarium, deFilm, Ariadna Films, and more.

== Animated film festivals in Romania ==
=== Animest International Animation Film Festival ===
The Animest International Animation Film Festival (known simply as Animest) is Romania's largest animation film festival and one of Eastern Europe's most respected animation events. The festival has been held annually in Bucharest every year, typically in October, since its founding in 2006. It is Romania's only Oscar-qualifying film festival. Animest includes both competitive and non-competitive categories and features a wide variety of animation projects, including feature films, short films, music videos, student projects, children's animation, and international films. The festival also features special events, including Creepy Animation Night, Trippy Animation Night, Erotica, Ani-music Night, and Cine-concerts.

The organizers of Animest focus on education, inclusion, and sustainability projects, including working with groups such as the Sisterhood of Young Animation Auteurs, as well as hosting workshops and pitching events for professional growth. Animest also facilitates collaboration between Romanian and international animation communities through networks such as the Animation Festival Network.

=== Animafantasia ===
Located in Iași, Animafantasia is an annual animation film festival that focuses exclusively on student animation. Typically held in November, the event features project showcases, workshops, and panel discussions focusing on the latest trends in Romanian animation. The festival highlights "diverse styles ... that push the boundaries of animation, reflecting unique perspectives worldwide." Animafantasia was founded in 2014 and includes international student competition and film school networking, with a focus on spotlighting emerging talent.

=== Animation Bucharest International Film Festival ===
The Animation Bucharest International Film Festival (ABIFF) is a newer festival that features both domestic and international animated films. The festival includes screenings in Bucharest and other Romanian cities, as well as hosting academic conferences and industry discussions.

The most recent ABIFF festival was held from June 5–7, 2026, in Bucharest and 11 other cities throughout Romania, including Pitești, Sinaia, Târgu-Jiu, Slănic-Prahova, Borșa, Vulcan, Reșița, Petroșani, Brad, Lupeni and Caransebeș.

== Selected list of Romanian animation ==
Title	Year	By
A fost odată un clovn	1984	Liana Petruțiu
A trăi	1983	Clemansa Gita Sion
Adresantul cunoscut		Nell Cobar
Albina și porumbelul	1951	Ion Popescu-Gop
Alfabetul		Iulian Hermeneanu
Allo, hallo	1962	Ion Popescu Gopo
Alter-ego		Mihai Bădică
Amicii noștri		Nell Cobar
Animamagic	1980	Ion Popescu Gopo
Anotimpul fericit		Olimp Vărășteanu
Anotimpurile		Florin Anghelescu
Arca lui Noe	1976	Horia Ștefănescu
Arena	1981	Zoltan Szilagyi
Ascensiunea		Virgil Mocanu
Aventură la muzeu	1956	Pascal Rădulescu
Aventurile lui Pin-Pin	1990	Luminița Cazacu
Avionul de hârtie		Tatiana Apahidean
Bagheta	1972	Gelu Mureșan
Balada		Bob Călinescu
Balada lui Tudor	1984	Ion Truică
Baladă pentru mărgica albastră	1983	Luminița Cazacu
Balaurul care nu era ca toți ceilalți	1981	Laurențiu Sârbu
Balena	1966	Constantin Mustețea
Basm	1966	Virgil Mocanu
Băiatul și cărbunele	1967	Ștefan Munteanu
Băiatul și porumbelul	1968	Liana Petruțiu
Bărbatul de la Adam până astăzi	1927	Aurel Petrescu
Băutura blestemată		Laurențiu Sârbu
Bizanț după Bizanț		Adrian Petringenaru
Brezaia	1968	Adrian Petringenaru
Bună dimineața, poveste	1970	Luminița Cazacu
Cadoul		Ion Truică
Cadru cu cadru	1981	Ion Popescu Gopo
Cale lungă	1976	Adrian Petringenaru
Caligrafie		Olimpiu Bandalac, Radu Igaszag, Zeno Bogdănescu, Lajos Nagy
Caligrafie	1982	Radu Igazsag, Zeno Bogdănescu, Olimpiu Bandalac, Lajos Nagy
Calomnierea calomniei	1970	Bob Călinescu
Câmpul		George Sibianu
Cântec pentru o veveriță		Bob Călinescu
Capete, figuri politice	1927	Aurel Petrescu
Capra cu trei iezi	1947	Aurel Petrescu
Carnavalul	1972	Ion Truică
Cartea cu guturai	1985	Liana Petruțiu
Cartea de flori	1979	Benone Șuvăilă
Casa	1984	Zeno Bogdănescu
Casa bunicilor	1979	Ion Manea
Căciulița cu ciuc roșu	1964	Constantin Popescu
Căluțul cu coama albastră	1969	Tatiana Apahidean
Căluțul de foc	1959	Iulian Hermeneanu
Cătălin și Cătălina		Laurențiu Sârbu
Chiț în pericol	1956	Bob Călinescu
Cine a furat apa?		Genoveva Georgescu
Cine a găsit mănușa		Constantin Mustețea
Cine a găsit vise frumoase		Liana Petruțiu
Cine a pierdut girafa		Luminița Cazacu
Cine râde la urmă	1986	Lucian Profirescu, Ion Manea, Artin Badea
Ciopârțilă		Iulian Hermeneanu
Circus	1991	Dinu Șerbescu
City		Florin Anghelescu
Ciufulici	1966	Laurențiu Sârbu
Cocorul		Bob Călinescu
Cojoacele babei Dochia		Tatiana Apahidean
Concurs		Adrian Petringenaru
Condiția Penelopei	1976	Luminița Cazacu
Construiește-ți o casă	1983	Mihai Bădică
Contrabandiștii		George Sibianu
Cotidiene	1964	Olimp Vărășteanu
Crepuscul		Ion Truică
Cuiul		Bob Călinescu
Culoarea		Dinu Petrescu
Cum a plecat nota 3		Isabela Petrașincu
Cuvinte	1968	Constantin Mustețea
D-ale organigramei		Matty Aslan
D-ale organigramei no. 2		Matty Aslan
D-ale organigramei no. 3	1976	Matty Aslan
D-ale zilei I	1923	Aurel Petrescu
D-ale zilei II	1923	Aurel Petrescu
D-ale zilei III: Politică-Modă-Finanțe-Import-Export	1926	Aurel Petrescu
D-ale zilei IV	1927	Aurel Petrescu
De ce n-are ursul coadă		George Sibianu
De ziua bunicii		Iulian Hermeneanu
Defect		Virgil Mocanu
Desen pentru o pasăre	1970	Letiția Popa
Din nou Formica		Matty Aslan
Doi iepurași	1952	Ion Popescu Gopo
Doi într-o barcă		Matty Aslan
Domnul Goe	1956	Bob Călinescu
Două creioane	1965	Iulian Hermeneanu
Drumul drept		Olimp Vărășteanu
Duluș și Lăbuș		Bob Călinescu
Dumbrava minunată		Olimp Vărășteanu
Duminica șerifului	1971	Adrian Nicolau
După amiezele Penelopei	1977	Luminița Cazacu
E pur si muove	1979	Ion Popescu Gopo
Ecce Homo	1978	Ion Popescu Gopo
Efectul unghiurilor	1981	Ion Popescu Gopo
Energica	1980	Ion Popescu Gopo
Eu + Eu = Eu	1969	Ion Popescu Gopo
Exodul spre lumină	1979	Sabin Bălașa
Expertiza de artă	1980	Adrian Petringenaru
Far West		Florin Anghelescu
Fata babei și fata moșului	1969	Liana Petruțiu
Femeia de la Eva până în zilele noastre	1927	Aurel Petrescu
Fereastra	1977	Laurențiu Sârbu
Festivitate de premiere		Dinu Șerbescu
Fetița de turtă dulce		Tatiana Apahidean
Fir de mătase		Tatiana Apahidean
Fiul stelelor	1988	Mircea Toia
Formica	1973	Matty Aslan
Formica tot Formica		Matty Aslan
Fotografii de familie	1982	Radu Igazsag
Fresca	1979	Bob Călinescu
Furtuna	1977	Ion Truică
Galaxia		Sabin Bălașa
Galilei	1984	Mihai Bădică
Gardul	1970	Gelu Mureșan
Geneză		Mihai Bădică
Glumă nouă cu fier vechi	1964	Bob Călinescu
Graba strică treaba	1984	Isabela Petrașincu
Grădina		Tatiana Apahidean
Greierele și furnica		Victor Antonescu
Gura lumii	1965	Horia Ștefănescu
Hai la circ	1967	Liana Petruțiu
Haplea	1927	Marin Iorda
Hibernarea		Tatiana Apahidean
Hidalgo	1975	Ion Truică
Hiroshima	1983	Ion Truică
Homo sapiens	1960	Ion Popescu Gopo
Icar		Mihai Bădică
Iepurele și broaștele		Victor Antonescu
Inima cea mică		Liana Petruțiu
Insula Negriței		George Sibianu
Intermezzo pentru o dragoste eternă	1974	Ion Popescu Gopo
Ivan Turbincă	1993	Radu Igazsag
În pădurea lui Ion	1970	Adrian Petringenaru
Încurcă-lume		Zeno Bogdănescu
Îngerul împușcat		Olimp Vărășteanu
Întâmplări de Anul nou	1982	Flori Liceică-Rădulescu
Joc de doi	1982	Mihai Bădică
Jocuri și jocuri	1980	Laurențiu Sârbu
La vânătoare		Olimp Vărășteanu
Legenda	1967	Virgil Mocanu
Leneșii mai mult aleargă		Tatiana Apahidean
Leo și Leo		Nell Cobar
Leul și șoarecele		Horia Ștefănescu
Lobodă	1939	Ion Popescu Gopo
Luna de pe cer		Adrian Nicolau
Lupul scamator	1981	Isabela Petrașincu
Maratonul Penelopei		Luminița Cazacu
Marea zidire	1974	Ion Truică
Mătura năzdrăvană		Iulian Hermeneanu
Metafora	1980	Mihai Bădică
Mica bufniță		Flori Liceică-Rădulescu
Micul toboșar		Virgil Mocanu
Mihaela	1968	Nell Cobar
Mimetism	1966	George Sibianu
Minunea	1976	Liana Petruțiu
Misiunea spațială Delta	1984	Mircea Toia și Călin Cazan
Mitică	1963	Nell Cobar
Monolog	1983	Zoltan Szilagyi
Motanul în cosmos		Iulian Hermeneanu
Motanul în lună	1926	Aurel Petrescu
Mozaic 4		Adela Crăciunoiu
Mozaic 6		Cristian Marcu
Muntele	1966	Paul Socrate Mateescu
Navigatorul	1993	Olimpiu Bandalac
Năzbâtiile lui Haplea		Nell Cobar
Năzdrăvanii		Bob Călinescu
Nimic despre Arhimede		Olimp Vărășteanu
Nodul gordian	1979	Zoltan Szilagyi
Norii		Mihai Bădică
Nuca și Zidul	1990	Radu Igazsag
O călătorie în țări nemaipomenite	1962	Savel Stiopul
O poveste cu ursuleți	1953	Matty Aslan
O zi		Radu Igazsag
Ochelarii de soare	1991	Tatiana Apahidean
Odă	1975	Sabin Bălașa
Omul sunător		Ion Truică
Orașul	1967	Sabin Bălașa
Orban Balazs	2022	Fazakas Szabolcs
Oul	1967	Constantin Mustețea
Paiața	1968	Virgil Mocanu
Panoramic		Nell Cobar
Parada cifrelor		Isabela Petrașincu
Paralele	1956	Liviu Ghiorț
Pata	1966	Liviu Ghiorț
Patru pitici	1967	Iulian Hermeneanu
Păcală amorezat	1925	Aurel Petrescu
Păcală în Lună	1920	Aurel Petrescu
Pățania lui Ion	1946	Jean Moraru
Pățaniile Mariei		Ion Manea
Pățaniile vulpoiului		Olimp Vărășteanu
Pe fir	1967	Constantin Mustețea
Pe un perete	1969	Ion Truică
Pegas	1985	Zaharia Buzea
Penele negre		Florin Anghelescu
Penelopa în templul artelor		Luminița Cazacu
Penelopa și cele nouă muze		Luminița Cazacu
Penelopa și gelozia		Luminița Cazacu
Penelopa și omuleții albaștri		Luminița Cazacu
Penelopa și Scufița Roșie		Luminița Cazacu
Penelopa și uriașii cei răi		Luminița Cazacu
Peripețiile lui Nod		Dinu Petrescu
Perpetuus renaștere		Adrian Petringenaru
Peșterile		Tatiana Apahidean
Picătura	1966	Sabin Bălașa
Pierde vară	1984	Călin Giurgiu
Pilule satirice		Olimp Vărășteanu
Pirații cosmosului		Mircea Toia
Pisica, iepurele și nevăstuica		Horia Ștefănescu
Piticul Cipi		Iulian Hermeneanu
Planeta vacanței		Iulian Hermeneanu
Plimbarea lui Esop	1967	Geta Brătescu
Podul	1985	Olimpiu Bandalac
Poem dinamic	1982	Emanuel Țeț
Pompele		Olimpiu Bandalac
Portret		Tatiana Apahidean
Posada		Ion Truică
Poveste cu cartonașe	1965	Laurențiu Sârbu
Poveste cu păpuși		Flori Liceică-Rădulescu
Poveste pe geamul înghețat	1967	Angela Buzilă
Povestea micului cuc		Liana Petruțiu
Povești pe un fir de lână		Isabela Petrașincu
Poveștile piticului Bimbo	1970	Horia Ștefănescu
Primul cântec		Radu Igazsag
Principiul lanului		Adrian Petringenaru
Prostia omenească	1968	George Sibianu
Proverbe ilustrate	1927	Aurel Petrescu
Puiul	1972	Laurențiu Sârbu
Puiul cu chitara		Florin Anghelescu
Punctul		Dinu Petrescu
Punguța cu doi bani	1947	Aurel Petrescu
Punguța cu doi bani	1949	Ion Popescu Gopo
Punguța cu doi bani	1975	Liana Petruțiu
Quo vadis, Homo sapiens?	1982	Ion Popescu Gopo
Raport	1980	Ștefan Anastasiu
Rapsodie în lemn	1960	Bob Călinescu
Rățoiul neascultător	1951	Ion Popescu Gopo
Rățoiul păcălit		Bob Călinescu
Remember		Ion Truică
Ritm		Bob Călinescu
Robinson Crusoe	1972	Victor Antonescu
România etnografică	1939	Dem Demetrescu
Romeo și Julieta	1968	Bob Călinescu
Rovine	1983	Ion Truică
Salt mortal	1982	Dinu Șerbescu
Salva		Ion Popescu Gopo
Să ne jucăm de-a Terra		Liana Petruțiu
Să nu uităm	1981	Olimp Vărășteanu
Sărutări	1969	Ion Popescu Gopo
Scrisorica	1949	Bob Călinescu
Scurtă istorie	1957	Ion Popescu Gopo
Sfera	1972	Virgil Mocanu
Soarele		Tatiana Apahidean
Soarele și trandafirul	1965	Iulian Hermeneanu
Soclul		Virgil Mocanu
Spectacol pentru un licurici supărat		Flori Liceică-Rădulescu
Spinii trandafirului		Nell Cobar
Statuia	1983	Olimpiu Bandalac
Stejarul din Borzești	1985	Mihai Șurubaru
Sticle		Mihai Bădică
Sticletele	1963	Artin Badea
Șapte arte	1958	Ion Popescu Gopo
Șerbetul		Mihai Bădică
Și totuși se mișcă	1980	Ion Popescu Gopo
Șoaptele iernii		Ion Truică
Șoricelul fotograf		Flori Liceică-Rădulescu
Șotronul	1975	Laurențiu Sârbu
Târgul de fete	1969	Angela Buzilă
Tatăl meu		Olimp Vărășteanu
Telefonul		George Sibianu
Temerarii de la scara doi	1987	Zaharia Buzea, Artin Badea, Marian Mihail, Ana-Maria Buzea
Teoria chibriturilor	1982	Nell Cobar
Teoria relativității		Olimp Vărășteanu
Timpul		Constantin Păun
Tocirea		Radu Igazsag
Toporul și pădurea		Bob Călinescu
Trei mere	1979	Ion Popescu Gopo
Trei pilule... greu de înghițit	1979	Ștefan Anastasiu
Trei povești de dragoste	1967	Letiția Popa
Tu?	1983	Ion Popescu Gopo
Tudorel și Vasilică	1975	Titus Mesaroș
Ucenicul vrăjitor	1957	Bob Călinescu
Uimitoarele aventuri ale mușchetarilor	1987	Victor Antonescu
Umor pe sfori	1954	Margareta Niculescu
Un bob, două boabe...	1982	Norbert Taugner
Valul	1968	Sabin Bălașa
Vânătoarea		Ion Truică
Variațiuni	1969	Olimp Vărășteanu
Variațiuni cu haltere		Florin Anghelescu
Vijelia	1984	Dinu Petrescu
Visul lui Boroboață	1961	Florin Anghelescu
Volumul		Dinu Petrescu
Vulpea păcălită	1952	Bob Călinescu
Vulpoiul campion		Olimp Vărășteanu
Zâmbetul	1965	Constantin Mustețea
Zâna de cerneală		Iulian Hermeneanu
Zdreanță		Olimp Vărășteanu
Zgribulici	1961	Ștefan Munteanu
Ziua însingurată		Ion Truică
Zmeul		Genoveva Georgescu
Zmeul	1979	Nicolae Alexi

== See also ==
- Gopo's Little Man, a character that appears in many Ion Popescu-Gopo films.
