= Ion Pas =

Romanian translator (1895–1974)

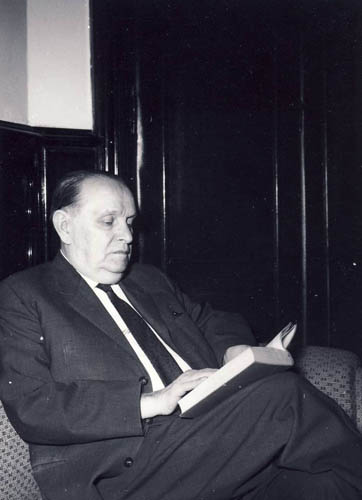
Ion Pas

Ion Pas (born Ioan M. Pascu; October 6, 1895 – May 20, 1974) was a Romanian novelist, translator and left-wing politician.

He was born in Bucharest in to a family of small craftsman. He attended primary school in the slum where he grew up, but was largely self-taught. He worked as a bricklayer's apprentice, typesetter, bookbinder and mechanic. His literary debut came in 1910, with the sketch "Barbu", published in Dumineca magazine. His first book was the 1912 Din lumea celor obidiți. From 1913, he was a contributor and editor at Constantin Costa-Foru's Revista copiilor și a tinerimii. He was part of the leadership at the Union of Professional Journalists and the General Association of the Press.

A longstanding leftist, he was a member of the Romanian Social Democratic Party (PSDR). From March 1946 to 1948, as a communist regime was being established, he headed the National Theatre Bucharest. From November 1946 to April 1948, he was Arts Minister. During this period, the communists were increasingly anxious about the continued existence of an independent social-democratic party. One subject of concern was Pas, whom they suspected of having translated the apostate communist writer Panait Istrati's Confession pour vaincus. Après 16 mois dans l'URSS during the 1930s, under the pen name P. Ioanid.

In February 1948, Pas took part in the PSDR's "merger" with the Romanian Communist Party to form the Romanian Workers' Party. He served on the party's central committee from that point until August 1969. From July 1955 to 1958, he was deputy Culture Minister, and from 1959 to January 1965, served as president of Romanian Radio's committee. He was president of the Romanian delegation to the Inter-Parliamentary Union, president of the Journalists' Syndicate from 1946, vice president of the Romanian Writers' Union and president of the Romanian Institute for Cultural Relations with the Abroad (1965-1974).

Pas published a number of magazines: Spre lumină (1912), Gazeta tinerimii (with Alexandru Terziman), Omul liber (1923-1925), Cugetul liber (1927-1928, with Eugen Relgis) and Șantier (1933-1937). His work appeared in Socialismul, Lumea nouă, Adevărul, Dimineața, Universul literar, Veselia, Viața sindicală, Lupta, A.B.C., Facla, Rampa, Cuvântul liber, Jurnalul, Presa noastră, Libertatea, Scînteia, România Liberă and Veac nou. Described by Leon Kalustian as gifted with a "conscientious and hard-working spirit", he wrote prolifically. Pas' output included tales (Draga noastră păsărică, 1951; Trecut întunecat, 1957; Povestiri vechi și noi, 1966), sketches and short stories (Din lumea celor obidiți, 1912; Lumea celor necăjiți, 1924; Taboluri în cărbune, 1935; Simple întâmplări, 1943; Lumea noastră, 1946), novels (Povestea unei fete, 1927; Veșnicul învins, 1931; Zilele vieții tale, I-IV, 1948-1950; Lanțuri, I-IV, 1950-1954) and memoirs (Oameni și momente, 1946; Galantar. Cărți și oameni, 1946; Așa a fost odată, 1955; Carte despre vremuri multe, 1963; Aducere aminte, 1972; Evocări, 1973). Authors he translated include Charles Dickens, Fyodor Dostoyevsky, Anatole France, Henry Fielding, Maxim Gorky, Victor Hugo, Stendhal, Upton Sinclair, Leo Tolstoy, Émile Zola and Jules Verne.

He was married to Sarina Cassvan, herself a writer. After he divorced her he married again with Shelly Eilenberg from about 1934 till his death in 1974. Pas served as a legislator for nearly a quarter-century: elected to the Assembly of Deputies for Prahova County in 1946, he remained in that body until it was dissolved in 1948. In the Great National Assembly that followed, he sat for Prahova County (1948-1952), Pitești Region (1952-1957) and for three districts in the Buzău area (1957-1961, 1961-1965 and 1965-1969). He was awarded the Order of Labor, first class (1955); the Order of the Star of the Romanian Socialist Republic, first class (1964); and the 23 August Order, first class (1965).
