= Gopo's Little Man =

- First appearance: A brief History (1957)
- Last appearance: Homo Faber (1986)
- Created by: Ion Popescu-Gopo

In-universe information
- Gender: Male

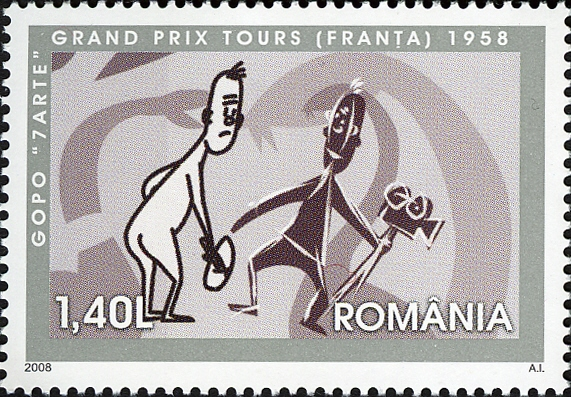
Gopo's Little Man on 2008 stamp

Gopo's Little Man (Romanian: Omulețul lui Gopo) is a simplistic naked humanoid character that appears in most of Ion Popescu-Gopo's animation films.

== History and symbolism ==
The Little Man first appears in A Brief History (1956), an animation film telling the story of the Universe and humankind from an evolutionary perspective. The trepidations caused by a dinosaur made a monkey fall off a tree and break its tail. The monkey then got off the ground under the appearance of The Little Man, who is then shown climbing a ladder. As he climbs, he successively turns into an Egyptian, a Greek, a Roman, a medieval knight, a Victorian gentleman, and a modern man.

The Little Man explores the deep seas and then flies to space in a rocket (anticipating Yuri Gagarin's spaceflight by five years).

The success achieved by A Brief History turned The Little Man into an iconic character, symbolizing the human race in its quest for knowledge and beauty. Ion Popescu-Gopo was going to use it in another seven films. In many situations, The Little Man is shown holding a flower to his heart, which is taken to symbolize the humans' capacity and need for love.

== Filmography ==
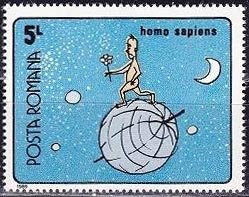
Homo Sapiens

- A Brief History (1956)
- Seven Arts (1958)
- Homo Sapiens (1960)
- Allo Hallo (1962)
- Ecce Homo (1977)
- Three Apples (1979)
- Quo Vadis, Homo Sapiens? (1982)
- Homo Faber (1986)

== Awards ==
- Palme d'Or in the Cannes Film Festival for A Brief History (1957)
- The Grand Prize for the Best Animation Film in the Tours Film Festival (France) for Seven Arts (1958)
- The Golden Gate Award of the San Francisco Film Festival for Homo Sapiens (1960)

== The Little Man statuette ==
Romanian artist Adrian Ilfoveanu was commissioned to create the trophy for the Gopo Awards, whose first edition in 2007 was also thought as a tribute to the 50th anniversary of A Brief History''s victory at Cannes. Gopo's Little Man was chosen as a model. Although the Gopo Awards were recently established, the statuette entered popular culture, so that Romanian cinematic artists talk about receiving one or more "Little Men."
