= Sarina Cassvan =

Romanian novelist and translator

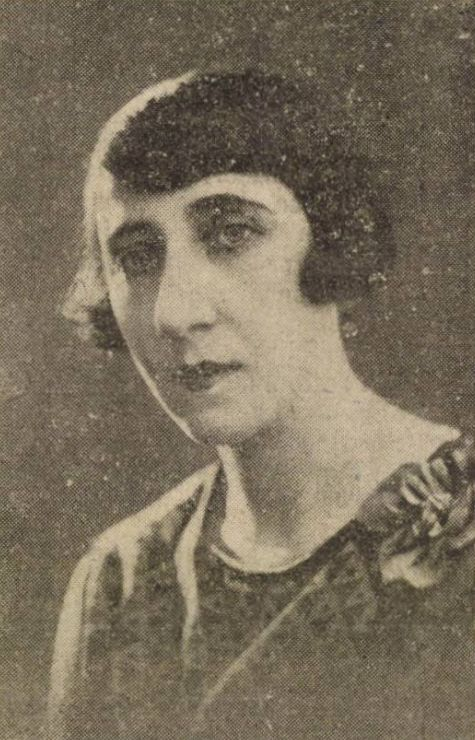
Image of Sarina Cassvan

Sarina Cassvan (born Sara Cassvan; January 3, 1894–January 8, 1978) was a Romanian novelist and translator.

Born into a Jewish family in Bacău, her parents were Lazăr Cassvan and his wife Janeta Alter Con. She attended the literature and philosophy faculty of the University of Bucharest. Her first work in journalism was published in 1912, while her first book, Crezul ocnașului, appeared the following year. She contributed to Revista copiilor și a tinerimii, Adevărul literar și artistic, Lupta, Cuvântul literar, Dimineața, Scena, Rampa, Femeia, Gazeta literară, and Contemporanul. Between 1929 and 1933, she sent correspondent's reports to Paris. In 1933, she edited the magazine 1933-1934. She founded the European Thought Association, which she led for eight years. During this time, the organization was sponsored by Elena Văcărescu and financed by prominent domestic and foreign individuals. Thanks to her ongoing literary activity and cultural promotion abroad, she was received into the Société des Auteurs Dramatiques and the Académie Féminine des Lettres. The World War II-era Ion Antonescu regime officially banned her entire work as "Jewish".

Besides short stories and novels, she wrote much children's literature, as well as a romanticized biography of Dimitrie Cantemir, the 1963 Între pană și spadă. Her 1933 30 de zile în studio was among the first books of reportages in the country, and also represented an early example of Romanian-language works about the cinema. Her plays were Măștile destinului (performed at the Iași National Theatre and at Paris' Théâtre Albert-I^{er}), Una sau mai multe femei and Calvar. Her children's plays were Niță, Nuța și Lăbuș, and În țara trântorilor; they appeared in Iași and in Bucharest. Cassvan assembled and translated Contes roumains d’écrivains contemporains, a 1931 anthology, and was responsible for numerous translations from world literature.

Her husband was fellow writer Ion Pas.
