= Constantin Costa-Foru =

Romanian journalist, lawyer and human rights activist

Constantin Gheorghe Costa-Foru (26 October 1856 – 15 August 1935) was a Romanian journalist, lawyer, and human rights activist.

He was born in Bucharest on 26 October 1856, in a wealthy family. His father, Gheorghe Costa-Foru (1820–1876), was a noted politician, twice minister, and the first rector of the University of Bucharest. The family had Aromanian origins, being originally from the city of Larissa, in Thessaly. In 1740 they had settled in Bucharest, where they amassed considerable wealth, building a mansion in Popești-Leordeni and summer residence was in Berca.

Costa-Foru studied in Heidelberg, then at Collège Sainte-Barbe in Paris, and around 1872 in Dresden. After finishing his studies he returned to Paris, where he married with Maria Ion Paspatti (1872–1935) on 26 June 1893. The couple had 10 children.

Constantin Costa-Foru was a vocal supporter of human rights, and accused the growing antisemitism in the post–World War I Romania. On one occasion he was attacked and beaten by a band of extremists as a result of his public discourse. In 1923 he was one of the founders of the League for Human Rights, working as its secretary. As a lawyer he pleaded, in 1925 at Turnu-Severin, against nationalist Corneliu Zelea Codreanu, leader of the anti-Semite Iron Guard, who had assassinated the prefect of Iași. However, as a result of the powerful lobby of the nationalist organisation, Codreanu was ultimately acquitted. Another contribution was in defending the rebels of Tatarbunary Uprising during the famous 1925 "Trial of the 500".

Costa-Foru was also one of the Romanian pioneers in the business of mineral and oil exploration, contributing to the creation of the first Romanian Coal Company (1903).

In memory of him and his father, two streets in Bucharest and one in Berca are named in their honor.
