= Curentul =

Romanian newspaper

- Founder: Pamfil Șeicaru
- Founded: January 1928
- Relaunched: October 1997
- Language: Romanian
- Circulation: 150,000 (June 2008)
- ISSN: 1223-7736
- Website: curentul.ro

Curentul is a Romanian newspaper, based in Bucharest. It was founded in January 1928 by Pamfil Șeicaru and relaunched in October 1997. Before 1944, Șeicaru had written daily the main editorial of Curentul since 1928.
