= Elections in the Ottoman Empire =

Overview of elections held in the Ottoman Empire

During the late Ottoman Empire, some elements of government were democratized. Seven general elections were held for the Chamber of Deputies, the popularly elected lower house of the General Assembly, the Ottoman parliament, two in the First Constitutional Era (1877–1878), and five in the Second Constitutional Era (1908–1920). The Chamber of Deputies used Ottoman electoral law. Local elections were held for provincial (Vilayet) assemblies, though they quickly fell out of fashion. In addition, Armenian, Protestant, and Jewish millets had their own assemblies: an Armenian National Assembly, a Protestant General Assembly, and a Jewish General Assembly, which held millet wide elections, with varying degrees of suffrage granted to laity outside Istanbul.

Before the Tanzimat, villages had long elected mukhtars, and for minorities: local ethnarchs, or kocabaşı.

== Ottoman general elections ==
- Ottoman general election, 1877 (first)
- Ottoman general election, 1877 (second)
- 1908 Ottoman general election
- April 1912 Ottoman general election
- October 1912 aborted Ottoman general election
- 1914 Ottoman general election
- 1919 Ottoman general election
- 1920 Ottoman general election

== Local elections ==
Local elections in the late Ottoman Empire were a crucial part of the state's efforts at administrative reform, known as the Tanzimat, particularly after the mid-19th century. While the Sultan remained the ultimate sovereign, the creation of Provincial General Councils (Meclis-i Umumi-i Vilayet) and municipal councils (Belediye Meclisi) introduced a limited form of democratic participation at the local level. These councils, which advised the governor on matters like public works, taxation, and budgets, were composed of both appointed officials and elected representatives chosen from the various religious communities (millets). Though often subject to bureaucratic interference and dominated by local elites, these elections provided a training ground for constitutional governance and allowed non-Muslim populations to participate directly in local administration for the first time, laying the groundwork for the more expansive national elections of the First Constitutional Era in 1876.

== Armenian National Assembly ==
The Armenian National Assembly was the key governing body of the Armenian community (millet) within the Ottoman Empire, established by the Armenian National Constitution of 1863 which was ratified by the Sultan. Elections for this body were conducted with suffrage granted to tax-paying male members of the Armenian Gregorian Church. The Assembly was composed of 140 deputies (20 clerical and 120 lay) and had a dual function, overseeing the activities of the Armenian Patriarch and managing the community's internal affairs through religious and civil councils, which appointed various committees for finance, education, and justice. However, representation was disproportionately weighted toward Constantinople, where 80 of the lay deputies and all the clergy were elected, meaning the vast majority of the Armenian population residing in the provinces was significantly underrepresented, despite a three-stage electoral process implemented outside the capital.

== Jewish General Assembly ==
The Jewish National Assembly (Meclis-i Cismani or Lay Council) of the Ottoman Empire, established under the framework of the Hahambaşı (Chief Rabbi) office and the subsequent organization of the Jewish millet (community), held elections to administer the internal, non-religious affairs of the community. Like the Armenian Assembly, suffrage was generally limited to tax-paying male members of the community residing in Constantinople, and the elections served to select members for the Lay Council, which governed matters of finance, education, property, and communal charitable institutions. While the Jewish millet was the most tightly controlled by the central government compared to the Greek and Armenian communities, these local elections were still a significant development, allowing for a degree of communal self-governance and providing experience in organizational politics within the Ottoman bureaucratic system, particularly as administrative reforms increased local powers throughout the 19th century.
