= 2nd Chamber of Deputies of the Ottoman Empire =

History
- Founded: 13 December 1877
- Disbanded: 14 February 1878
- Preceded by: 1st Chamber of Deputies
- Succeeded by: 3rd Chamber of Deputies

Leadership
- President of the Chamber of Deputies: Hasan Fehmi Pasha
- Vice-president of the Chamber of Deputies: Ohannes Hüdaverdyan Efendi
- Seats: 106 deputies

Elections
- Voting system: Electoral college
- Last election: Second half of 1877
- Next election: December 1908

The Second Chamber of Deputies of the Ottoman Empire was elected in the second 1877 Ottoman general election. The parliament served from 13 December 1877 to 14 February 1878.

Coinciding with the Russo-Turkish War of 1877-1878, the Parliament set aside legislative matters to discuss government actions and the management of the war. Worried about increasing opposition to his government, Abdulhamid II suspended the Chamber of Deputies indefinitely on 14 February 1878 on the grounds of wartime necessities, based on the authority granted to him in Article 7 of the constitution and the approval of the Senate.

Vilayet	Residence	Deputy	Faith	Ethnicity
Bosnia	Mostar	Mustafa Sitki Efendi	Muslim	Bosnian
Bosnia	Banja Luka	Selimzade Fehmi Bey	Muslim	Bosnian
Bosnia	Ljubushki	Mehmed Muhyi Efendi	Muslim	
Bosnia	Nevesinje	Ibrahim Bey	Muslim	
Bosnia	Sarajevo	Pero Efendi	Christian (Catholic)	Bosnian
Bosnia	Travnik	Maroshik Yozo Efendi	Christian (Catholic)	Bosnian
Bosnia	Sarajevo	Yaver Efendi	Jewish	Jew
Bosnia		Salamon Efendi	Jewish	Jew
Danube	Silistra	Aliş Pasha	Muslim	Turk
Danube	Pleven	Nuri Bey	Muslim	Turk
Danube	Varna	Izladizade Şakir Efendi	Muslim	Turk
Danube	Ruschuk	Petraki Slatov Efendi	Christian	Bulgarian
Danube	Varna	Murad Bey	Christian	Armenian
Danube	Ruschuk	Agop Kazanjyan	Christian	Armenian
Kosovo	Prishtina	Zeynelabidin Efendi	Muslim	
Kosovo	Nish	Süleyman Bey	Muslim	Bulgarian
Kosovo	Narda	Ymer Efendi Drini	Muslim	Albanian
Kosovo		Hadji Ahmed Aga	Muslim	
Kosovo		Apostol Aga	Christian	
Kosovo		Andon Aga	Christian	
Kosovo		Sotraki Aga	Christian	
Kosovo		Mihodanosh Aga	Christian	
Skutari		Selim Göriz Aga	Muslim	Albanian
Skutari	Podgorica	Yusuf Ziyaeddin Efendi	Muslim	Albanian
Skutari		Angeli Efendi	Christian	Albanian
Skutari	Skutari	Filip Aga Rosto	Christian	Albanian
Janina	Janina	Mustafa Nuri Bey Vlora	Muslim	Turk
Janina		Abdyl Bey Frashëri	Muslim	Turk
Janina	Berat	Mehmet Ali Bey Vrioni	Muslim	Turk
Janina	Janina	Nikola Chanaka Efendi	Christian (Orthodox)	Greek
Janina	Janina	David Matasya Levi Efendi	Jewish	Jew
Janina		Mihail Hristo Efendi	Christian	Greek
Salonica		Mehmed Şefik Pasha	Muslim	Turk
Salonica	Rodovishte	Mustafa Bey	Muslim	Turk
Salonica	Salonica	Abdülkerim Bey	Muslim	Turk
Salonica	Xanthi	Sheikh Mollazade	Muslim	Turk
Salonica		Mehmed Efendi		
Salonica	Salonica	Vasilaki Papazoglu Efendi	Christian (Orthodox)	Greek
Salonica	Serres	Mihalaki Bey	Christian (Orthodox)	Bulgarian
Salonica	Salonica	Istefan Tadi Efendi	Christian (Orthodox)	Greek
Salonica	Monastir	Avram Efendi	Jewish	Jew
Salonica	Salonica	Ibrahim Bey	Muslim	Turk
Edirne	Edirne	Hadji Sherif Bey	Muslim	Turk
Edirne	Edirne	Rifat Efendi	Muslim	Turk
Edirne	Edirne	Rasim Bey	Muslim	Turk
Edirne		Reşid Bey	Muslim	Turk
Edirne	Edirne	Rupen Zasioglu	Christian (Catholic)	Armenian
Edirne	Edirne	Kostaki Peridi Efendi	Christian	Greek
Edirne	Samakov	Zahari Efendi	Christian	Bulgarian
Edirne	Tekirdağ	Yorgiyo Atinadoros Efendi	Christian (Orthodox)	Greek
Edirne	Plovdiv	Mihalaki Gümüshgerdan Bey	Christian	Greek
Constantinople	Constantinople	Yusuf Ziya Pasha	Muslim	Turk
Constantinople	Constantinople	Mehmed Sadık Pasha	Muslim	Turk
Constantinople	Constantinople	Hasan Fehmi Efendi	Muslim	Turk
Constantinople	Constantinople	Hacı Ahmed Efendi	Muslim	Turk
Constantinople	Constantinople	Asim Molla Bey	Muslim	Turk
Constantinople	Constantinople	Ohannes Hüdaverdyan	Christian (Catholic)	Armenian
Constantinople	Constantinople	Yuvan Shishmanoglu	Christian (Orthodox)	Greek
Constantinople	Constantinople	Hagop Kazazian Efendi	Christian	Armenian
Constantinople	Constantinople	Aleksan Sakazade	Christian (Orthodox)	Greek
Constantinople	Constantinople	Kemal Efendi	Jewish	Jew
Aegean Islands	Çanakkale	Sheikh Nuri Efendi	Muslim	Turk
Aegean Islands	Rhodes	Hacı Vasil Efendi	Muslim	
Aegean Islands	Rhodes	Hacı Hüseyin Efendi	Muslim	Turk
Aegean Islands	Mytilene	Zafıraki Ipandrevmenos	Christian (Orthodox)	Greek
Aegean Islands	Tenedos	Vasil Gambi Efendi	Christian (Orthodox)	Greek
Aegean Islands	Mytilene	Yorgalidi Efendi	Christian (Orthodox)	Greek
Crete	Not represented			
Samos	Not represented			
Hüdavendigar	Bursa	Sheikh Ahmed Bahaeddin Efendi	Muslim	Turk
Hüdavendigar	Bursa	Rıza Efendi	Muslim	Turk
Hüdavendigar	Bursa	Pavlidi Efendi	Christian (Orthodox)	Greek
Hüdavendigar	Bursa	Sahak Yavrumyan Efendi	Christian	Armenian
Aydin	Izmir	Yenişehirlizade Hacı Ahmed Efendi	Muslim	Turk
Aydin	Izmir	Menekşeli Hacı Emin Efendi	Muslim	Turk
Aydin	Izmir	Ragıb Bey	Muslim	Turk
Aydin	Izmir	Mina Hamadopolo	Christian (Orthodox)	Greek
Aydin	Izmir	Agop Efendi	Christian	Armenian
Konya		Hacı Mehmed Efendi	Muslim	Turk
Konya		Mustafa Efendi	Muslim	Turk
Konya	Konya	Simonaki Degirmenjioglu Efendi	Christian (Orthodox)	Greek
Kastamonu		Hacı Mustafa Bey	Muslim	Turk
Kastamonu		Selim Efendi	Muslim	Turk
Ankara	Ankara	Hacı Tevfik Efendi	Muslim	Turk
Ankara	Ankara	Süleyman Refik Efendi	Muslim	Turk
Ankara		Melkon Denioglu Efendi	Christian	Armenian
Ankara	Kayseri	Agop Efendi	Christian	Armenian
Adana	Kozan	Çamurdanzade Hoca Mustafa Efendi	Muslim	Kurd
Adana	Adana	Hacı Mustafa Efendi	Muslim	
Janik	Not represented			
Sivas		Ethem Efendi	Muslim	Turk
Sivas		İhsanüllah Efendi	Muslim	Turk
Sivas		Kevork Efendi	Christian	Armenian
Diyarbekir	Diyarbekir	Hadji Mehmed Mes'ud Efendi	Muslim	
Diyarbekir	Mardin	Osep Kazazyan	Christian	Armenian
Mamuretülaziz		Hadji Hafez Mahmud Vejdi Efendi	Muslim	
Trabzon	Trabzon	Hacı Emin Efendi	Muslim	Turk
Trabzon	Trabzon	Emin Hilmi Efendi	Muslim	Turk
Trabzon	Trabzon	Ohannes Kürekyan Efendi	Christian	Armenian
Erzurum		Kiragos Kazanjyan Efendi	Christian	Armenian
Erzurum		Hachaduryan Efendi	Christian	Armenian
Van				
Aleppo	Marash	Sa'di Efendi	Muslim	Arab
Aleppo		Jabirizadah Nafi' Efendi	Muslim	Arab
Aleppo	Aleppo	Abdul Qadir Efendi	Muslim	Arab
Aleppo		Karaja Manok Efendi	Christian (Catholic)	Armenian
Mount Lebanon	Not represented			
Syria	Beirut	Abdurrahim Badran Efendi	Muslim	Arab
Syria	Damascus	Muhammad Tawfiq Efendi	Muslim	Arab
Syria	Beirut	Nikola al-Naqash Efendi	Christian (Maronite)	Arab
Syria	Beirut	Khalil Ghanim Efendi	Christian (Maronite)	Arab
Jerusalem		Yusuf Ziya al-Khalidi	Muslim	Arab
Hejaz	Medina	Sayyid Muhammad Zayhi Efendi	Muslim	Arab
Hejaz	Mecca	Sayyid 'Uthman Efendi	Muslim	Arab
Yemen	Not represented			
Basra	Not represented			
Baghdad		Rif'at Bey	Muslim	Arab
Baghdad		Abdul Rizaq Efendi	Muslim	Arab
Baghdad	Baghdad	Menaham Saleh Daniel Efendi	Jewish	Jew
Tripolitania		Mustafa al-Hamdani Efendi	Muslim	Arab
Tripolitania		Hadji Ahmad Ghalib Bey	Muslim	Arab

== Sources ==
- Devereux, Robert (1963). The First Ottoman Constitutional period: A Study of the Midhat Constitution and Parliament. London: The Johns Hopkins Press. pp. 269–275.
- Kayalı, Hasan (1995). "Elections and the Electoral Process in the Ottoman Empire, 1876-1919" (PDF). International Journal of Middle East Studies. 27 (3): 265–286. doi:10.1017/S0020743800062085. JSTOR 176251. S2CID 44470151 – via Cambridge University Press.
