= 1st Chamber of Deputies of the Ottoman Empire =

History
- Founded: 19 March 1877
- Disbanded: 28 June 1877
- Succeeded by: 2nd Chamber of Deputies

Leadership
- President of the Chamber of Deputies: Ahmed Vefik Pasha
- Vice-president of the Chamber of Deputies: Ohannes Hüdaverdyan Efendi
- Seats: 115-119 deputies

Elections
- Voting system: Electoral college
- Last election: First half of 1877
- Next election: Second half of 1877

The First Chamber of Deputies of the Ottoman Empire was elected in the first 1877 Ottoman general election. The parliament served from 19 March 1877 to 28 June 1877.

Vilayet	Residence	Deputy	Faith	Ethnicity
Bosnia	Novi Pazar	Murad Bey	Muslim	Turk
Bosnia	Banja Luka	Selimzade Fehmi Bey	Muslim	Bosnian
Bosnia	Travnik	Naimzade Mehmed Bey	Muslim	
Bosnia	Sarajevo	Petraki Petrovich Efendi	Christian (Orthodox)	Serb
Bosnia	Travnik	Maroshik Yozo Efendi	Christian (Catholic)	Bosnian
Bosnia	Sarajevo	Yaver Disraeli Efendi	Jewish	Jew
Bosnia	Nevesin	Ibrahim Bey	Muslim	
Bosnia		Ali Efendi	Muslim	
Bosnia		Stefan Efendi	Christian	
Bosnia	Mostar	Sava Efendi	Christian	
Danube	Silistria	Aliş Pasha	Muslim	Turk
Danube	Plevna	Nuri Bey	Muslim	Turk
Danube	Varna	İzladizade Şakir Efendi	Muslim	Turk
Danube	Tulja	Dimitraki Teodorov Efendi	Christian	Greek
Danube	Tulja	Stepanaki Efendi	Christian	Bulgarian
Danube	Ruschuk	Petraki Slatov Efendi	Christian	Bulgarian
Kosovo		Şehsüvar Bey	Muslim	
Kosovo	Nish	Süleyman Bey	Muslim	
Kosovo	Sofia	Feyzi Efendi	Muslim	Bulgarian
Kosovo	Samakov	Zahari Efendi	Christian	Bulgarian
Kosovo		Misho Todori	Christian	
Skutari		Toydanzade Sami Bey	Muslim	Albanian
Skutari	Podgorica	Yusuf Ziyaeddin Efendi	Muslim	Albanian
Skutari		Angeli Efendi	Christian	Albanian
Skutari	Skutari	Filip Aga Rosto	Christian	Albanian
Janina	Janina	Mustafa Nuri Bey Vlora	Muslim	Turk
Janina	Lebhova	Ali Nakî Bey	Muslim	
Janina	Preveza	Veysel Bey Dino	Muslim	
Janina	Janina	Nikola Chanaka Efendi	Christian (Orthodox)	Greek
Janina		Algivyadi Lambi Efendi	Christian (Orthodox)	Greek
Janina	Volos	Argiri Kantarji Efendi	Christian (Orthodox)	Greek
Salonica	Drama	Ömer Tahir Pasha	Muslim	Turk
Salonica	Salonica	İbrahim Namık Bey	Muslim	Turk
Salonica	Salonica	İsmail Rasih Bey	Muslim	Turk
Salonica		Hacı Süleyman Efendi	Muslim	Turk
Salonica		Rifat Bey	Muslim	Turk
Salonica	Seres	Mihalaki Bey	Christian (Orthodox)	Bulgarian
Salonica		Yorgi Efendi	Christian	Greek
Salonica		Dimitri Efendi	Christian	Bulgarian
Salonica	Salonica	Stefanos Konstantinou Tattis Efendi	Christian (Orthodox)	Greek
Salonica	Salonica	Vasilaki Papazoglu Efendi	Christian (Orthodox)	Greek
Salonica	Monastir	Avram Efendi	Jewish	Jew
Edirne	Edirne	Hacı Şerif Bey	Muslim	Turk
Edirne	Edirne	Rifat Efendi	Muslim	Turk
Edirne	Edirne	Rasim Bey	Muslim	Turk
Edirne	Edirne	Hasanağazade Hüsnü Bey	Muslim	Turk
Edirne	Edirne	Rupen Zasioglu Efendi	Christian (Catholic)	Armenian
Edirne	Edirne	Kara Mihaloglu Yorgaki Efendi	Christian	Bulgarian
Edirne	Tekirdağ	Yorgiyo Atinadoros Efendi	Christian (Orthodox)	Greek
Edirne	Edirne	Panayotaki Jiridoglu Efendi	Christian	Greek
Constantinople	İstanbul	Ahmed Vefik Pasha	Muslim	Turk
Constantinople	İstanbul	Ahmed Hilmi Efendi	Muslim	Turk
Constantinople	İstanbul	Hasan Fehmi Efendi	Muslim	Turk
Constantinople	İstanbul	Hacı Ahmed Efendi	Muslim	Turk
Constantinople	İstanbul	Hacı Ahmed Efendi	Muslim	Turk
Constantinople	İstanbul	Sebuh Maksudyan Efendi	Christian (Gregorian)	Armenian
Constantinople	İstanbul	Ohannes Hüdaverdyan	Christian (Catholic)	Armenian
Constantinople	İstanbul	Nikolaki Suladi Efendi	Christian (Orthodox)	Greek
Constantinople	İstanbul	Vasilaki Seragiyoti Bey	Christian (Orthodox)	Greek
Constantinople	İstanbul	Avram Ajiman Efendi	Jewish	Jewish
Aegean Islands	Chanak	Şeyh Nuri Efendi	Muslim	Turk
Aegean Islands	Rhodes	Hacı Vasil Efendi	Muslim	
Aegean Islands		Mehmed Bey	Muslim	Turk
Aegean Islands	Mytilene	Zafiraki Ipandrevmenos Efendi	Christian (Orthodox)	Greek
Aegean Islands		Nikolaki Efendi	Christian (Orthodox)	Greek
Crete		Halil Rami Efendi	Muslim	Turk
Samos	Not Represented			
Hüdavendigar	Bursa	Sheikh Ahmed Bahaeddin Efendi	Muslim	Turk
Hüdavendigar	Bursa	Rıza Efendi	Muslim	Turk
Hüdavendigar	Bursa	Pavlidi Efendi	Christian (Orthodox)	Greek
Hüdavendigar	Bursa	Sahak Yavrumyan Efendi	Christian	Armenian
Aydin	İzmir	Yenişehirlizade Hacı Ahmed Efendi	Muslim	Turk
Aydin		Evliyazade Hacı Mehmet Efendi	Muslim	Turk
Aydin		Ragıp Bey	Muslim	Turk
Aydin		Yanoko Chartinoglu	Christian (Orthodox)	Greek
Aydin	İzmir	Agop Efendi	Christian	Armenian
Konya		Çelebi Hüseyin Efendi	Muslim	
Konya		Hacı Fasih Efendi	Muslim	
Konya	Konya	Simonaki Degirmenjioglu	Christian (Orthodox)	Greek
Kastamonu		Hacı Mustafa Bey	Muslim	Turk
Kastamonu		Salım Efendi	Muslim	Turk
Ankara	Ankara	Süleyman Refik Efendi	Muslim	Turk
Ankara		Hacı Abdi Bey	Muslim	Turk
Ankara		Mikael Altintop	Christian	Armenian
Adana		Çamhurdanzade Hoca Mustafa Efendi	Muslim	Kurd
Adana		Kâzım Hey	Muslim	
Adana		Kirkor Bizdikoglu Efendi	Christian	Armenian
Janik	Not represented			
Sivas		Mehmet Ali Efendi	Muslim	Turk
Sivas		Hacı Ahmed Bey	Muslim	Turk
Sivas		Agop Shahinyan Efendi	Christian	Armenian
Diyarbakır	Diyarbakır	Hacı Mehmed Mes'ud Efendi	Muslim	
Diyarbakır	Harput	Hadji Hafez Mahmud Vejdi Efendi	Muslim	
Diyarbakır	Mardin	Osep Kazazyan Efendi	Christian	Armenian
Mamuretülaziz		Hacı Mehmed Efendi	Muslim	
Mamuretülaziz		Hacı Mahmud Efendi	Muslim	
Trabzon	Trabzon	Tahirağazâde Hacı Emin Efendi	Muslim	Turk
Trabzon	Trabzon	Ali Galip Efendi Eyüboğlu	Muslim	Turk
Trabzon	Trabzon	Yorgaki Kavronidi Efendi	Christian (Orthodox)	Greek
Erzurum	Erzurum	Ahmed Muhtar Efendi	Muslim	Turk
Erzurum	Erzurum	Hacı Rauf Bey	Muslim	Turk
Erzurum	Erzincan	Hamzasb Kallajyan Efendi	Christian	Armenian
Erzurum	Erzurum	Danyel Karajyan Efendi	Christian	Armenian
Van	Not represented			
Aleppo	Marash	Sa'di Efendi	Muslim	Arab
Aleppo		Jabirizadah Abdulnafi Efendi	Muslim	Arab
Aleppo		Husayn Husnu Efendi	Muslim	Arab
Aleppo		Karaja Manok Efendi	Christian (Catholic)	Armenian
Mount Lebanon	Not represented			
Syria	Beirut	Hajji Husayn Bayhum	Muslim	Arab
Syria	Homs	Khalid Atassi Efendi	Muslim	Arab
Syria	Beirut	Nikola al-Naqash Efendi	Christian (Maronite)	Arab
Syria	Tripoli	Nawfal Bey	Christian (Orthodox)	Arab
Jerusalem	Jerusalem	Yusuf Ziya al-Khalidi	Muslim	Arab
Hejaz	Medina	Sayyid Ahmad Efendi al-Barzanji	Muslim	Arab
Hejaz	Mecca	Sayyid Abdullah Efendi al-Daghastani	Muslim	Arab
Yemen		Sheikh Ali Efendi	Muslim	Arab
Yemen		Sheikh Muhammad Efendi	Muslim	Arab
Basra	Not represented			
Baghdad	Baghdad	Sharif Abdurrahman Wasfi Bey	Muslim	Arab
Baghdad		Abdurrezaq Efendi	Muslim	Arab
Baghdad	Baghdad	Menaham Saleh Daniel Efendi	Jewish	Jew
Tripolitania		Mustafa al-Hamdani Efendi	Muslim	Arab
Tripolitania		Sulaiman Qapudan Efendi	Muslim	Arab

== Sources ==
- Devereux, Robert (1963). The First Ottoman Constitutional period: A Study of the Midhat Constitution and Parliament. London: The Johns Hopkins Press. pp. 261–268.
- Kayalı, Hasan (1995). "Elections and the Electoral Process in the Ottoman Empire, 1876-1919" (PDF). International Journal of Middle East Studies. 27 (3): 265–286. doi:10.1017/S0020743800062085. JSTOR 176251. S2CID 44470151 – via Cambridge University Press.
