= Prime Minister of Turkey =

Head of government of Turkey (1920–2018)

Prime Minister of the Republic of Turkey
- Türkiye Cumhuriyeti Başbakanı (Turkish)
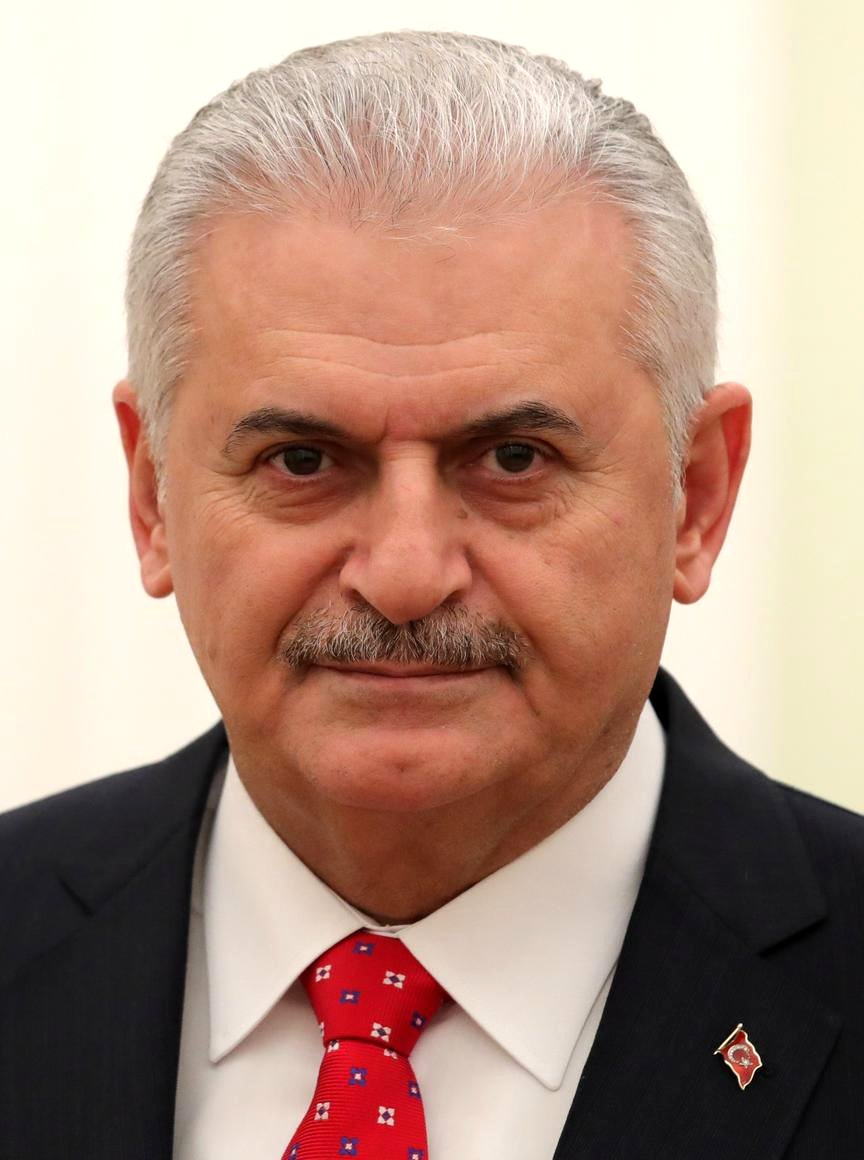
- Last served Binali Yıldırım; 24 May 2016 – 9 July 2018
- Executive branch of the Turkish Government
- Type: Head of government
- Status: Abolished
- Member of: Cabinet of Turkey; National Security Council
- Reports to: The Parliament
- Residence: Prime Ministry Building (1925–1937); Başbakanlık Konutu (1937–2014); Çankaya Mansion (2014–2018)
- Appointer: The president In accordance with voting in the Grand National Assembly
- Term length: 5 years (same as the term of Grand National Assembly); While commanding the majority in the parliament. No term limits are imposed on the office.
- Constituting instrument: Constitution of Turkey
- Precursor: Grand Vizier of the Ottoman Empire
- Formation: 3 May 1920; 106 years ago (Ankara Government); 1 November 1923; 102 years ago (Republic)
- First holder: Mustafa Kemal Atatürk (Ankara Government); İsmet İnönü (Republic)
- Final holder: Binali Yıldırım
- Abolished: 9 July 2018
- Superseded by: President (As head of government)
- Deputy: Deputy Prime Minister
- Website: www.basbakanlik.gov.tr

The prime minister of Turkey, officially the prime minister of the Republic of Turkey (Turkish: Türkiye Cumhuriyeti Başbakanı), was the head of government of Turkey from 1920 to 2018. Under Turkey's former parliamentary system, the prime minister led a political coalition in the Grand National Assembly and presided over the cabinet. As such, the holder of the premiership was generally the dominant figure in Turkish politics, outweighing the president. The office's functions and powers changed occasionally throughout the political history of Turkey before it was dissolved as a result of the 2017 constitutional referendum.

== History of the premiership ==
=== Ottoman era ===
In the Ottoman Empire, the prime minister of the Ottoman sultan held the title of Grand Vizier (Turkish: Sadrazam), though in the 19th century, some heads of government were appointed with the title Prime Minister, (Turkish: Başnazır). Starting in the 1830s, Grand Viziers began to minister cabinets. After the Tanzimat period in the 19th century, the grand viziers came to assume a role more like that of the prime ministers of contemporary Western European monarchies. Later, with the Ottoman constitution of 1876, a parliament was established to oversee the grand vizier. With the constitutional amendments that took place during the Second Constitutional Era, the grand vizier was made answerable to the parliament rather than the sultan.

=== Government of the Grand National Assembly ===
After the establishment of the Grand National Assembly in Ankara by the Turkish National Movement, the 1st Parliament instituted a new government called "The Cabinet of the Executive Ministers" (Turkish: İcra Vekilleri Heyeti). The post was then held by the Speaker of the Parliament, who presided over the cabinet ex-officio.

=== Modern republic ===
One-party period (1923–1945)

Following the declaration of the republic, the existing constitution of 1921 was amended, conferring the executive authority and the privilege to oversee governmental affairs to the prime minister, who was to be appointed by the president of the republic.

Although the Presidency was established as a symbolic office with the president being unaccountable for his actions, Presidents Atatürk and İnönü had exercised executive authority as the leader of their party during the one-party period.

Multi-party period (1945–2018)

Prior to the general election held in 1950, the constitution was amended, disallowing the president-elect to remain the leader of their political party. These amendments resulted in the prime minister becoming the dominant figure in Turkish politics, sharply diminishing the role of the president.

After Prime Minister Adnan Menderes was ousted from power as a result of the 1960 Turkish coup d'état, the newly promulgated Constitution of 1961 reduced the powers of the government considerably, strengthening parliamentary supervision over the cabinet. These features of the constitution resulted in a fractured political system, causing many short-lived coalition governments to be formed until 1980.

In the aftermath of the 1980 Turkish coup d'état, the Constitution of 1982 (still in use) was implemented. Even though the Constitution of 1982 was quite similar to its predecessor, there were new measures taken to avoid the formation of short-lived coalition governments. These measures included the introduction of 10% electoral threshold, unicameral parliamentary structure, and enforced executive powers. Along with broad executive powers being vested in the post of the prime minister, the realm of authority of the cabinet ministries (with the exclusion of the prime ministry) was drastically reduced, placing the ministers under the direct supervision of the prime minister.

Later on, numerous amendments were made on the constitution, with the ones of paramount importance being the 2007, 2010, and 2017. Some of the changes approved by public vote were highly controversial.

According to some, the direct election of the president for the first time in 2014 resulted in a de facto transition into a semi-presidential system, bringing an end to the prime minister's dominant authority in Turkish politics.

Following the general elections in 2018, constitutional amendments approved in the 2017 referendum officially took effect, marking the end of 98 years of parliamentary governance in Turkey.

Seal of the prime minister, in use between 2015 until the office was abolished in 2018.

== See also ==
- Air transports of heads of state and government
- Official state car
- List of prime ministers of Turkey
- President of Turkey
  - List of presidents of Turkey
- Vice President of Turkey
- Constitution of Turkey
