= Constitutional era of the Ottoman Empire =

The Constitutional era of the Ottoman Empire may refer to:

- First Constitutional Era (Ottoman Empire) (1876-1878)
- Second Constitutional Era (Ottoman Empire) (1908-1920)
