= First 1877 Ottoman general election =

First general elections in the history of the Ottoman Empire

First 1877 Ottoman general elections
- 1877

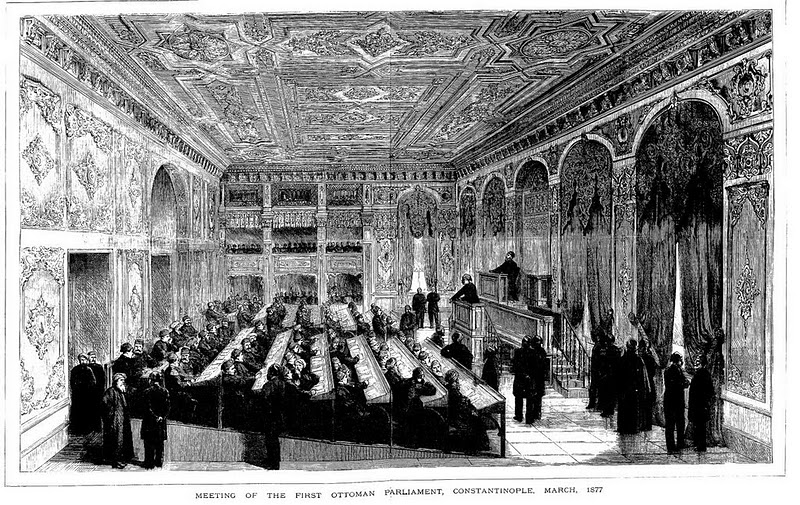
Meeting of the First Ottoman Parliament, Constantinople, March 1877.

The first general elections in the history of the Ottoman Empire were held in 1877.

== Background ==
Provisional Electoral Regulations were issued on 29 October 1876, stating that the elected members of the Provincial Administrative Councils would elect members to the first Parliament of the Ottoman Empire. On 24 December a new constitution was promulgated, which provided for a bicameral Parliament with a Senate appointed by the Sultan and a popularly elected Chamber of Deputies. Only men above the age of 30 who were competent in Ottoman Turkish and had full civil rights were allowed to stand for election. The grounds for disqualification included holding dual citizenship, being employed by a foreign government, being bankrupt, being employed as a servant, or having "notoriety for ill deeds".

== Results ==
Chart of the Ottoman Chamber of Deputies

The first 1877 Ottoman general election resulted in the formation of the empire’s first constitutional Chamber of Deputies, which was designed to include 130 seats under the provisional electoral regulations, 80 reserved for Muslim representatives and 50 for non-Muslim communities. Because of administrative delays and irregularities, however, fewer members actually took their seats, with contemporary records indicating around 115–119 deputies convening when Parliament opened on 19 March 1877. Since political parties did not yet exist in the Ottoman Empire, the composition reflected communal and provincial representation rather than ideological groupings.

== Aftermath ==
Parliament convened on 19 March 1877 and adjourned on 28 June. Fresh elections were held later in the year for a new Parliament that convened in December.

== See also ==
- 1st Chamber of Deputies of the Ottoman Empire
