= Imperial Parliament =

Imperial Parliament may refer to:

- During the British Empire, the Parliament of the United Kingdom
- The Imperial Council of Austria
- The General Assembly of the Ottoman Empire
