= Ahmed Hamdi Pasha =

Grand Vizier of the Ottoman Empire in 1878

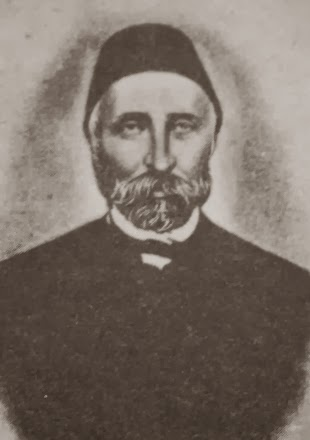

Grand Vizier of the Ottoman Empire
- In office 11 January 1878 – 4 February 1878
- Preceded by: Ibrahim Edhem Pasha
- Succeeded by: Ahmed Vefik Pasha

Personal details
- Born: 1826
- Died: 1885 (aged 58–59)

Ahmed Hamdi Pasha (Ottoman Turkish: احمد حمدی پاشا) (1826–1885) was an Ottoman monarchist, administrator and conservative statesman during the First Constitutional Era.

== Biography ==
He was the governor of İzmir from 1873 to 1874 and he afterwards served as the governor of Bosnia throughout the rest of 1874. From 1875 to 8 May 1876, and from 1880 to 1885, he was the governor of Damascus, Syria. In 1876 he was also the governor of Shkodër, Albania for a brief period.

He served shortly as Grand Vizier of the Ottoman Empire from 11 January 1878 to 4 February 1878 during the Russo-Turkish War (1877–1878).

The Ottoman Sultan Abdul Hamid II dismissed him upon pressure of the Young Ottomans during the First Constitutional Era.

He is buried in Beirut, Lebanon, in Bachoura cemetery.
