= Ahmed Vefik Pasha =

Grand Vizier of the Ottoman Empire in 1878 and 1882

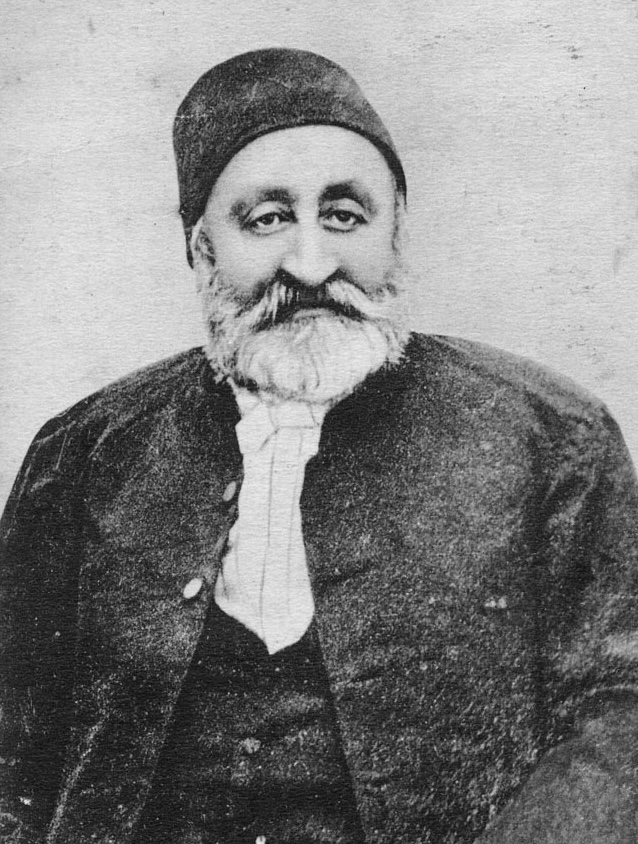

Prime Minister of the Ottoman Empire
- In office 4 February 1878 – 18 April 1878
- Monarch: Abdul Hamid II
- Preceded by: Ahmed Hamdi Pasha
- Succeeded by: Mehmed Sadık Pasha
- In office 1 December 1882 – 3 December 1882
- Monarch: Abdul Hamid II
- Preceded by: Mehmed Sadık Pasha
- Succeeded by: Mehmed Said Pasha

Personal details
- Born: 3 July 1823 Constantinople, Ottoman Empire
- Died: 2 April 1891 (aged 67) Constantinople, Ottoman Empire

Ahmed Vefik Pasha (Ottoman Turkish: احمد وفیق پاشا) (3 July 1823 – 2 April 1891) was an Ottoman statesman, diplomat, scholar, playwright, and translator during the Tanzimat and First Constitutional Era periods. He was commissioned with top-rank governmental duties, including presiding over the first Ottoman Parliament in 1877. He also served as Prime Minister for two brief periods. He also established the first Ottoman theatre and initiated the first Western style theatre plays in Bursa and translated Molière's major works into Turkish. His portrait was depicted on the Turkish postcard stamp dated 1966.

== Biography ==
Ahmed Vefik Pasha was born of Greek extraction, his ancestors having previously converted to Islam, like many other Greek Muslims particularly from Crete (Cretan Turks) and Macedonia in what is now northwestern Republic of Greece (see Vallahades). He started his education in 1831 in Constantinople and later went to Paris with his family, where he graduated from Saint Louis College.

In 1844 Ahmed Vefik was appointed to review claims of special exemptions from the jizya tax. Under some agreements, European officials had started to extend their extraterritorial privileges to "proteges" - Ottoman Christians of Maltese and Ionian origins. Concerned with the massive revenue loss from unpaid jizya taxes in İzmir Province, where around two thirds of the tax had become uncollectable, Ahmed Vefik was chosen to assess over 1,500 claims of British protection.

Ahmed Vefik was twice made the Minister of Education of the Ottoman Empire. Though he was twice appointed Head of Government, he was appointed with the title "Prime Minister" instead of "Grand Vizier". He built a theatre in Bursa when he was made the governor of the city. In 1860, he became the Ottoman ambassador to France. He wrote the first Turkish dictionary and is considered to be among the first Pan-Turkists.

Political offices
Preceded by Ahmed Hamdi Pasha	Grand Vizier of the Ottoman Empire; 4 February 1878 – 18 April 1878	Succeeded by Mehmed Sadık Pasha
Preceded by Mehmed Said Pasha	Grand Vizier of the Ottoman Empire; 1 December 1882 – 3 December 1882	Succeeded by Mehmed Said Pasha
