= First Constitutional Era =

Period of constitutional monarchy in the Ottoman Empire (1876–1878)

The First Constitutional Era (Ottoman Turkish: مشروطيت; Turkish: Birinci Meşrutiyet Devri) was a period of constitutional monarchy De jure in the Ottoman Empire from 23 December 1876 until 14 February 1878. It began with the promulgation of the Ottoman constitution, written by members of the Young Ottomans. The Young Ottomans were dissatisfied by the Tanzimat and pushed for a constitutional government similar to that in Europe. The constitutional period started with the dethroning of Sultan Abdul Aziz. After Murad V's ephemeral reign, Abdul Hamid II took his place as Sultan. The era ended with the suspension of the Ottoman Parliament and the constitution by Sultan Abdul Hamid II, with which he return absolute monarchy De jure.

The first constitutional era did not include a party system. At the time, the Ottoman Parliament (known as the General Assembly of the Ottoman Empire) was seen as the voice of the people but not as a venue for the formation of political parties and organizations. The elections for the Parliament were held in accordance with the provisional electoral regulations. The General Assembly of the Ottoman Empire was composed in two houses. The lower house of the bicameral legislature was the Chamber of Deputies, while the upper house was the Senate, or Chamber of Notables. The initial selection of deputies was made by administrative councils in the provinces (also called Meclis-i Umumi).

After the establishment of the General Assembly in the provinces, the members selected the deputies from within the assembly to form the Chamber of Deputies in the capital. The Chamber had 115 members and reflected the distribution of the millets in the empire. In the second elections, there were 69 Muslim millet representatives and 46 representatives of other millets (Jews, Phanariotes, Armenians). The second body was the Senate, and the members were selected by the Sultan. The Senate had only 26 members. It was designed to replace the porte, and the Grand Vizier become the speaker of Senate. The two elections happened between 1877 and 1878.

== First term, 1877 ==
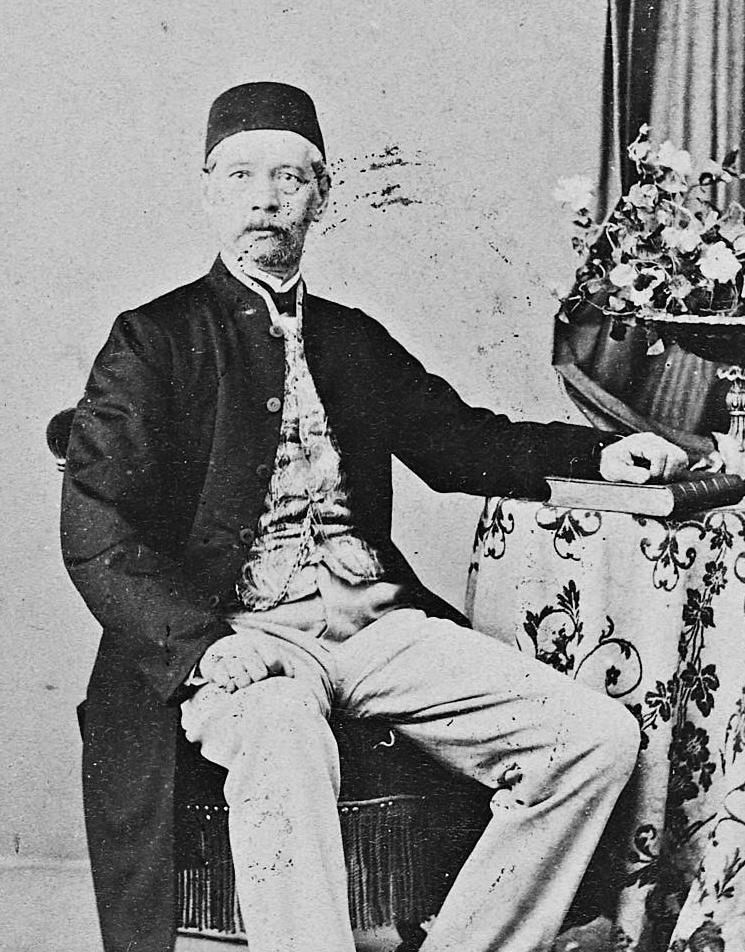
Mehmed Kani Pasha, member of the first Ottoman Parliament.

The members' reactions to the approaching war were very strong, and Sultan Abdul Hamid II asked for new elections citing the Russo-Turkish War (1877–1878).

Ottoman constitutional period

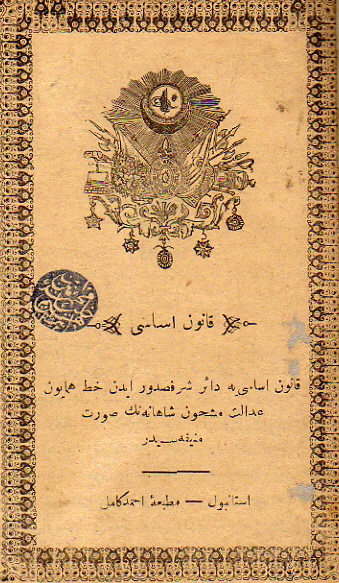
Ottoman constitution of 1876

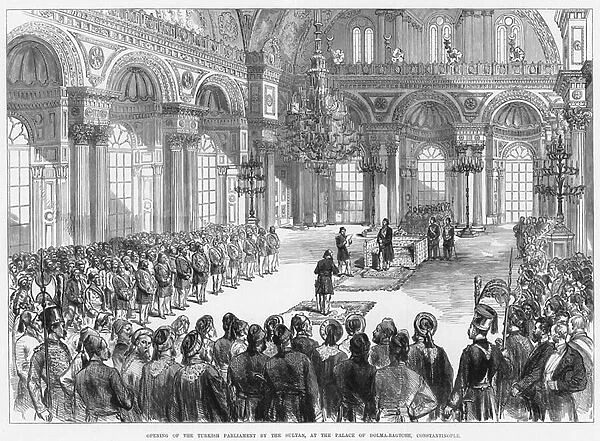
Opening ceremony of the first parliament at the Dolmabahçe Palace 19 March 1877. Illustrated London News

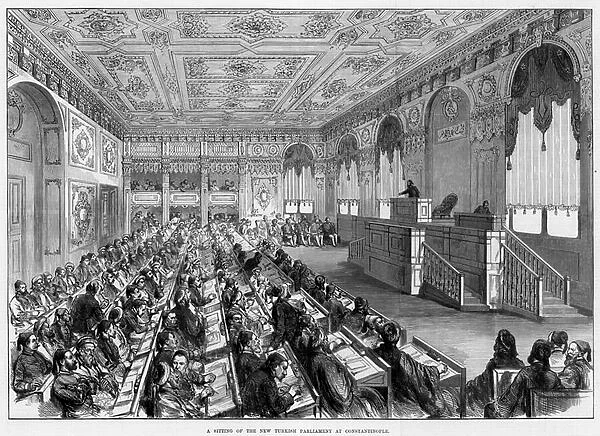
Meeting of the first Parliament later on the same day at the Old Darülfünun building.

== Second term, 1878 ==
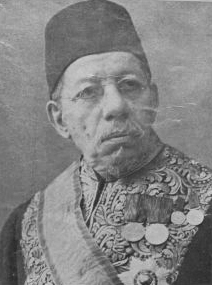
Mehmed Raif Pasha, member of the first Ottoman Parliament.

The life of the second term of the parliament was merely a few days, as after the initial speeches by the members from Balkan vilayets, Abdul Hamid II closed the parliament, citing social unrest.

The president of the Chamber of Deputies was a Deputy from Jerusalem, Yusif Dia Pasha Al Khalidi.

== Significant people ==
- Mehmed Rushdi Pasha
- Ahmed Vefik Pasha
- Hussein Avni Pasha
- Midhat Pasha
- Suleiman Pasha

== See also ==
- Second Constitutional Era
- Constitutional history of Turkey
- Elections in the Ottoman Empire
