= Menahem Saleh Daniel =

Iraqi businessman, landowner, philanthropist and politician (1846–1940)

- مناحيم صالح دانيال
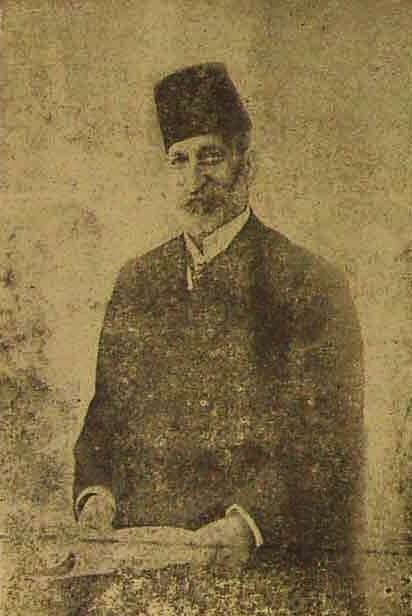

Senator
- In office 1925–1929
- Constituency: Baghdad

Member of the Chamber of Deputies of the Ottoman Empire
- In office 1877–1880
- Constituency: Baghdad

Personal details
- Born: 1 March 1846 Baghdad, Ottoman Empire (now Iraq)
- Died: 3 November 1940 (aged 94) Baghdad, Iraq
- Resting place: Ezekiel's Tomb, Baghdad
- Profession: Businessman, landowner, politician

Menahem Saleh Daniel (Arabic: مناحيم صالح دانيال; 1 March 1846 – 3 November 1940) was an Iraqi businessman, landowner, philanthropist and politician. He served as a member of the Senate of Iraq and deputy of the Ottoman Chamber of Deputies representing Baghdad.

== Biography ==
Menahem Saleh Daniel was born on 1 March 1846 in Baghdad, to Iraqi Jewish parents. He studied in the schools of Baghdad before moving to Europe to study science. He was elected on behalf of Baghdad as a representative in the first Ottoman Chamber of Deputies in 1877. He became famous in commercial and economic circles and was known for his commercial relations with the country's notables. Daniel was appointed as a member of the first board of directors of the Baghdad Brigade, which was founded by the governor, Medhat Pasha. After the establishment of the monarchy in Iraq, he became a member of the Senate of Iraq in 1925, representing the Mosaic Jewish community in Iraq. His son Ezra Saleh Daniel (1874–1952) succeeded him on the Senate.

His father Saleh Daniel, was famous for his charitable projects and had a palace located in Al-Sinak area. Menahem Daniel was known as the "Man with the White Hand" as he founded and built the first orphanage for Muslim orphans and spent on it from his own money to help Muslim orphans and those from different sects.

== Philanthropy ==
Daniel made substantial donations to both Jewish and Muslim charities, and built a Muslim orphanage in 1928, and a Jewish primary school in 1910.

== Personal life ==
His nephew was Sassoon Eskell.
