= Chamber of Deputies (Ottoman Empire) =

Lower house of the General Assembly of the Ottoman Empire

Chamber of Deputies مجلس مبعوثان Meclis-i Mebusan

Type
- Type: Lower house of the Ottoman Parliament

History
- Founded: 23 December 1876; 23 July 1908
- Disbanded: 14 February 1878; 11 April 1920
- Preceded by: Divan-ı Hümayun
- Succeeded by: Grand National Assembly
- Seats: 275

Elections
- Voting system: Electoral college
- First election: 1877
- Last election: 1919

Meeting place
- Dolmabahçe Palace (1876-1878); Darülfünûn building (1876-1878, 1908); Çırağan Palace (1909); Cemile Sultan Palace (1910-1920)

March of the Deputies
Turkish: Mebusan Marşı
The anthem of the Chamber of Deputies, performed at its reopening in 1909.

The lyrics reference the contemporary 1908 Young Turk Revolution leaders Ahmed Niyazi Bey and Enver Pasha, as well as democrats of the previous generation, Namık Kemal and Midhat Pasha.

The Chamber of Deputies (Ottoman Turkish: مجلس مبعوثان Meclis-i meb'ūs̱ān; Turkish: Meclis-i Mebusân or Mebuslar Meclisi) of the Ottoman Empire was the lower house of the General Assembly, the Ottoman Parliament. Unlike the upper house, the Senate, the members of the Chamber of Deputies were elected by the general Ottoman populace, although suffrage was limited to men of a certain financial standing, among other restrictions that varied over the Chamber's lifetime.

== First Constitutional Era (1876–1878) ==
In the First Constitutional Era, which only lasted for two years from 1876 to 1878, the initial selection of Deputies was made by the directly elected Administrative Councils in the provinces, who acted as an electoral college for Deputies and also as local governments. The first Chamber met on 19 March 1877. Its main power during this period was its right to vote on annual budgets submitted by the Council of Ministers. All members of the parliament, including those in the Chamber, had a right to free expression and were immune from arrest and criminal prosecution during their term, unless their chamber voted to waive this right for a member.

After the establishment of the whole parliament, General Assembly (Turkish: Meclis-i Umumî), in the provinces, the members selected the deputies from within the General Assembly to form the Chamber of Deputies (Turkish: Meclis-i Mebusan) in the capital, Constantinople. The Chamber of Deputies had 130 members and reflected the distribution of the millets in the empire. After the first elections, a sort of trial to populate the Chamber for the first time, there were 71 Muslim millet representatives, 44 Christians millet representatives, and 4 Jewish millet representatives. After the second elections, there were 69 Muslim representatives and 46 representatives of other millets (Jews, Greeks, Armenians, etc.).

The actions of the Chamber were subject to a veto by the upper house, the Senate (whose members were selected by the Sultan), thus limiting the Chamber's power during this period. No true system of checks and balances between the houses of parliament or the Sultan's office existed during this period. The second session of the Chamber lasted from 13 December 1877 to 14 February 1878, when Sultan Abdul Hamid II dismissed General Assembly and the 1876 constitution, restoring his despotism. The sultan, known to be paranoid of limitations on his personal power, had become increasingly alarmed of the open criticisms leveled by the members of the parliament at the military policies and inefficiencies of his reign.

== Second Constitutional Era (1908–1920) ==
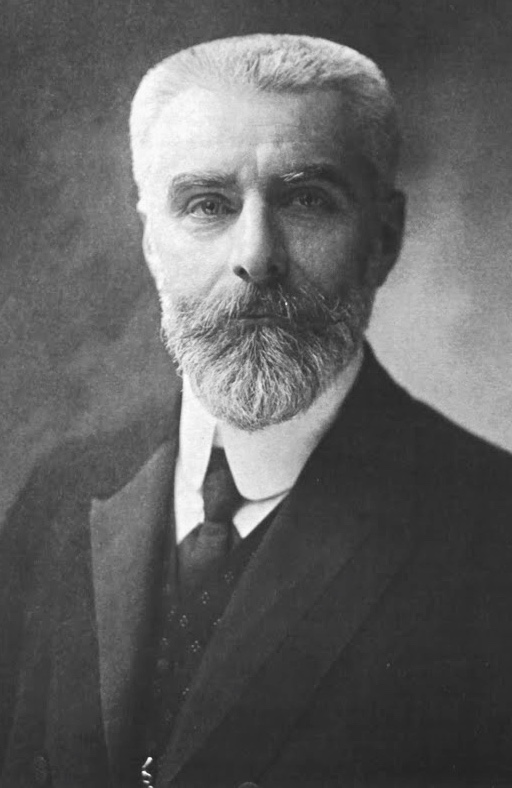
Ahmet Riza, first president

The Second Constitutional Era of the Ottoman Empire began shortly after Abdul Hamid II was forced to restore the constitutional monarchy after the 1908 Young Turk Revolution. The longer lasting period also saw the establishment of many political groups and parties. Ahmet Rıza became the first President of the Chamber in 1908. Following the 31 March Incident in 1909 an amendment to the original 1876 constitution resulted in the Chamber gaining more true political power at the expense of the non-democratically elected Senate and the Sultan. A series of elections during this period resulted in the gradual ascendance of the Committee of Union and Progress's (CUP) domination in politics. The second largest party was the Liberty Party (1908 - 1910) and the Freedom and Accord Party (1911 - 1920) (Turkish: Hürriyet ve İtilâf) both parties led by Mehmed Sabahaddin.

The second constitutional era came to a de facto end after the 1912 elections (known as the Sopalı Seçimler, "Election of Clubs"), which the CUP was widely understood to have rigged in its favor. After the 1913 Ottoman coup d'état the following year and the seizure of power by the CUP triumvirate known as the Three Pashas, the Chamber of Deputies, along with the Sultan and the Senate, ceased to exercise any meaningful political power over the government.

The era formally ended after World War I during the Occupation of Constantinople. The last meeting on 18 March 1920 produced a letter of protest to the Allies, and a black cloth covered the pulpit of the parliament as reminder of its absent members.On April 11, 1920, the Assembly was dissolved by the Sultan under pressure from the occupying forces. Some deputies were arrested. Many of the deputies who were not arrested went to Anatolia and joined the new assembly in Ankara. The assembly in Ankara declared at its first opening meeting that it was the continuation of the assembly in Istanbul.

== March of the Chamber of Deputies ==
The leaders of the revolution, Ahmed Niyazi Bey and Enver Pasha, were mentioned in the March of the Deputies (Turkish: Meclis-i Mebusan Marşı), the anthem of the restored Chamber of Deputies (see audio at top right at 01:20); the fourth line was sung "Long live Niyazi, long live Enver!" (Turkish: "Yaşasın Niyazi, yaşasın Enver!").

== Parliaments sessions ==
=== First Constitutional Era ===
- 1st Chamber of Deputies of the Ottoman Empire (First half of 1877)
- 2nd Chamber of Deputies of the Ottoman Empire (Second half of 1877)

=== Second Constitutional Era ===
- 3rd Chamber of Deputies of the Ottoman Empire (1908–1912)
- 4th Chamber of Deputies of the Ottoman Empire (1912–1914)
- 5th Chamber of Deputies of the Ottoman Empire (1914–1919)
- 6th Chamber of Deputies of the Ottoman Empire (1919–1920)

== See also ==
- Elections in the Ottoman Empire
- List of political parties in the Ottoman Empire
- Senate of the Ottoman Empire, the upper house
- General Assembly of the Ottoman Empire, the parliament as a whole
