= Abdurrahman Sami Pasha =

Ottoman statesman

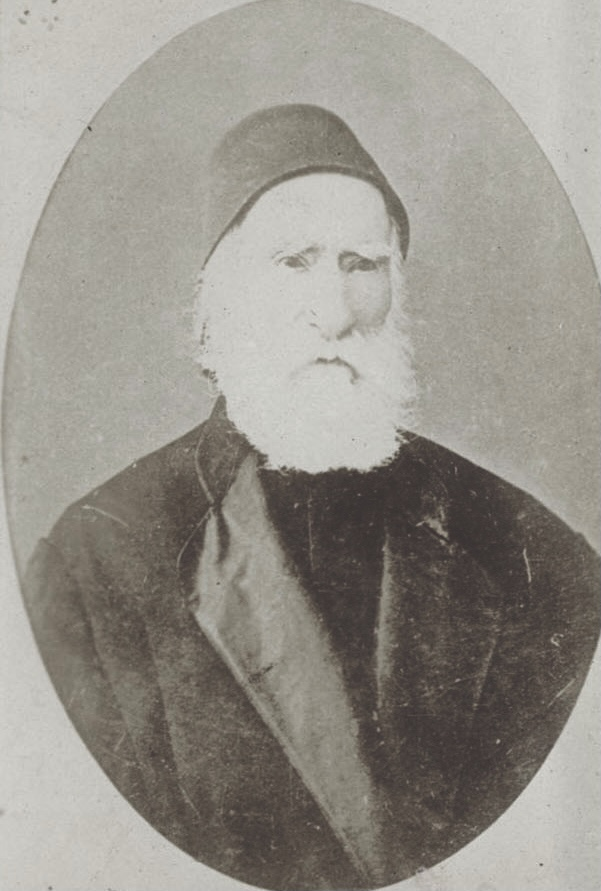
Abdurrahman Sami Pasha

Abdurrahman Sami Pasha (1794–1882) was an Ottoman bureaucrat, statesman, and one of the founders of the Senate. He was also the first Minister of Education.
