= Da'ud Effendi Molko =

- Born: 1845; Salonica
- Died: Unknown
- Occupations: Statesman, translator

Da'ud Effendi Molko (born 1845) was an Ottoman statesman. He served as Chief Translator

of the Imperial Divan, and later as a member of the Ottoman Senate.

== Biography ==
Molko was born into a modest Jewish family in Salonica, and moved to Constantinople during his childhood. He received his early education at the Camondo Institution. At the age of 18, he joined the Foreign Office, where he eventually rose to the position of Chief Translator under Sultan Abdulaziz. He continued to hold this position during the reign of Sultan Abdul Hamid II.

Molko sided with the Young Turks movement during the 1908–9 revolution. In 1910, he was appointed a member of the Senate.

Throughout his career, Molko received numerous honors. He was awarded the Grand Cordon of the Order of Nishan-i-Osmanie, the Order of the Nishan-i-Medjidie, the Nishan-i-Imtiaz, and the Persian Order of the Sun and Lion. He was also recognized as a Commander of the French Legion of Honor and was decorated with the Order of the Crown of Prussia and the Swedish Order of the Star, First Class.
