= Mehmed Sadık Pasha =

Ottoman statesman and Grand Vizier (1826–1901)

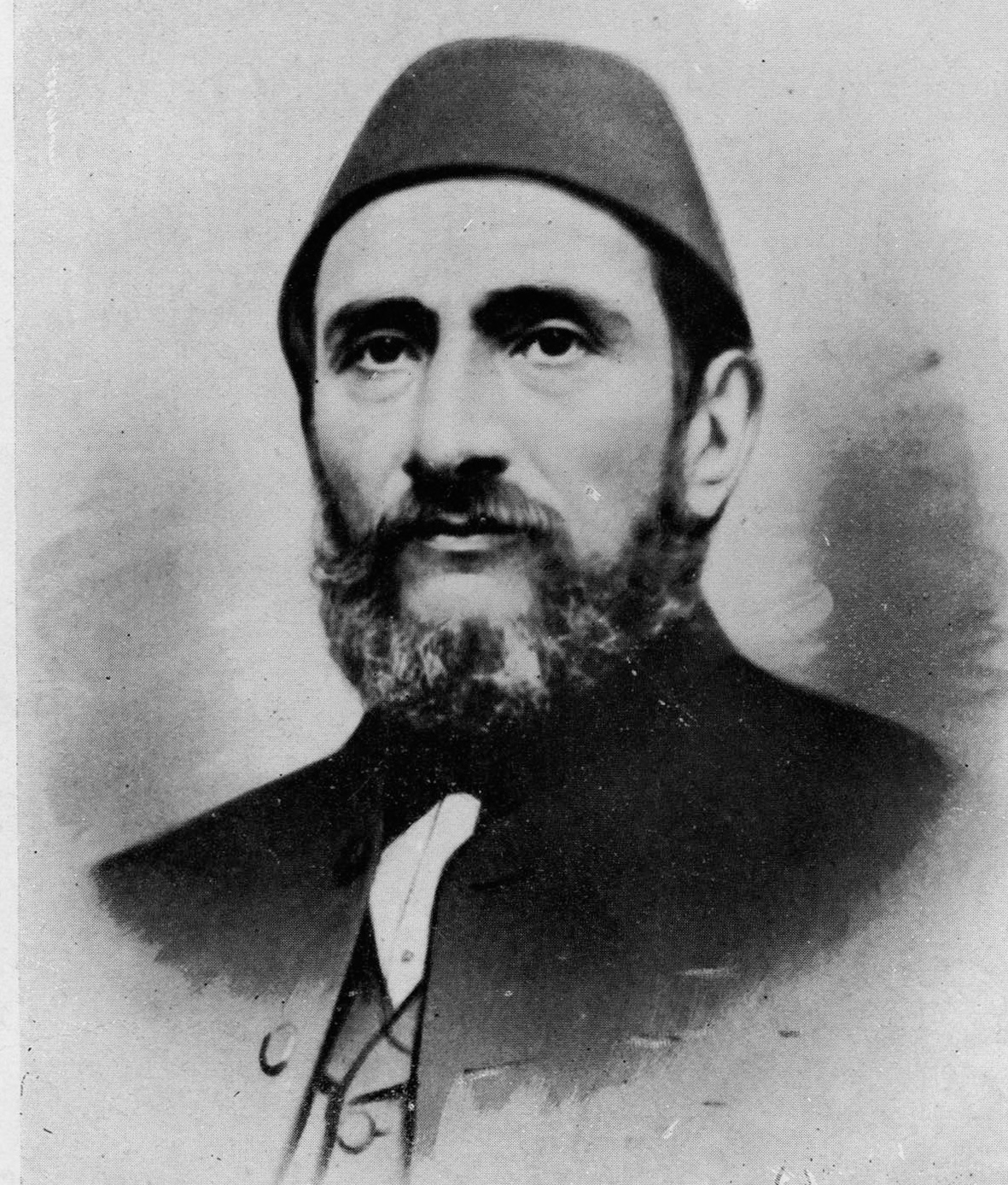

Grand Vizier of the Ottoman Empire
- In office 18 April 1878 – 28 May 1878
- Preceded by: Ahmed Vefik Pasha
- Succeeded by: Mehmed Rushdi Pasha

Personal details
- Born: 1826 Ottoman Empire
- Died: 1901 (aged 74–75) Ottoman Empire

Mehmed Sadık Pasha (Ottoman Turkish: محمد صادق پاشا) (1826 – 1901) was an Ottoman conservative statesman and a member of the Senate. He was the Grand Vizier of the Ottoman Empire from 18 April 1878 to 28 May 1878. He also served as governor of the Aidin Vilayet of the Ottoman Empire.
