= Second Constitutional Era =

Period of constitutional monarchy in the Ottoman Empire (1908–1920)

The Second Constitutional Era (Ottoman Turkish: ایكنجی مشروطیت دورى; Turkish: İkinci Meşrutiyet Devri) was the period of restored parliamentary rule in the Ottoman Empire between the 1908 Young Turk Revolution and the 1920 retraction of the constitution, after the dissolution of the Chamber of Deputies, during the empire's twilight years. Alternative end dates for era include 1912 or 1913.

The rule of Sultan Abdulhamid II had been opposed by the Young Turks, an underground movement of reformists which called for the restoration of constitutional monarchy. In 1908, a faction within the Young Turks called the Committee of Union and Progress (CUP) forced Abdulhamid II to restore the liberal constitution of 1876 and the General Assembly in the Young Turk Revolution. Abdulhamid II had previously suspended the parliament and constitution in 1878, two years after they had been introduced. Whereas the short First Constitutional Era lacked political parties, the second era initially featured unprecedented political pluralism within the empire and openly contested elections.

The period was marked by political instability as opposition groups attempted to challenge the CUP's dominance and its increasingly repressive tendencies. In 1909, the CUP was briefly expelled from Constantinople (Istanbul) during the 31 March incident, a reactionary uprising sparked by a mutiny of soldiers from the city's garrison. In the aftermath of the crisis, Abdulhamid II was deposed and his brother Mehmed V appointed sultan. The second largest party, the Freedom and Accord Party, remained locked in a power struggle with the CUP and following electoral fraud by the CUP in the 1912 general election its military wing launched a successful coup in July 1912. The CUP regained power in a coup the following year and repressed other opposition parties, effectively establishing a one-party state led by the "Three Pashas", Talaat Pasha, Enver Pasha, and Cemal Pasha.

The empire was in a perpetual state of crisis as it suffered continual territorial losses: Bulgaria declared independence, Austria-Hungary annexed Bosnia and ethnic conflict in Ottoman Macedonia continued unabated. Italy invaded Ottoman Tripolitania in 1911 and the empire lost the vast majority of its remaining European territory when the Balkan League overran Rumelia in 1912. In 1914, the Ottoman Empire entered World War I and the increasingly radicalised CUP conducted ethnic cleansing and genocide against the empire's Armenian, Assyrian, and Greek citizens, events sometimes collectively referred to as the Late Ottoman genocides. Following the Ottoman surrender in 1918, the CUP leadership fled into exile and the Allies occupied Constantinople. The Ottoman Parliament angered the Allies by signing the Amasya Protocol with Turkish revolutionaries in Ankara and agreeing to a Misak-ı Millî (National Pact). As plans for the partition of the Ottoman Empire advanced following the Conference of London, the Allies forced the dissolution of the assembly, thus bringing the Second Constitutional Era to an end. Many parliamentarians would become members of the Grand National Assembly during Turkey's War for Independence, and ultimately continued their careers in the Republic.

== Background ==
A consequence of the French Revolution and the Napoleonic wars was popularisation of ideas such as nationalism and nation states, which made multi-cultural countries and empires increasingly difficult to appear legitimate to minority ethnic groups. The Ottoman Empire was no exception to this wave of nationalism, and its Christian subjects would especially start to rise up to demand full independence. These demands for independence by Christians who did not identify with Ottoman rule would therefore turn the Empire's previously multicultural society upside down, creating cycles of violence and suspicion between neighbors.

To solve the many problems the Empire was facing the Tanzimat reforms (1839–1876) were undertaken not only to modernize the Ottoman Empire, but also to build a cohesive Ottoman national identity centered around national pride in the House of Osman rather than in an ethno-religious group. Another problem facing the Empire was that its Christian subjects achieved significant economic advancement in contrast to its Muslim subjects due to external patronage from the European powers, which Muslims were not given access to. Therefore, centralization and economic nationalism were also key goals of Ottomanism and Tanzimat, not only in create equality for all under the law by consolidating previously autonomous sections of society such as abolishing the outdated Millet system, but also to empower the government to redistribute wealth and opportunity to its Muslim subjects.

Abdulhamid II ascended to the throne in 1876 at the height of this period of reform in the Ottoman Empire. One of his first acts as Sultan was transforming the Ottoman Empire into a constitutional monarchy with the introduction of a constitution, thus starting the Empire's first short experience with democracy: the First Constitutional Era. However, in the aftermath of Russian invasion in 1877–1878, following criticism of his handling of the war, Abdulhamid used his constitutional power as Sultan to suspend parliament and the constitution. He instead went on to rule as an autocrat (istibdâd as marked by contemporaries, although many expressed longings for his old-fashioned despotism a few years into the new regime), emphasizing the empire's Islamic character and his position as Caliph.

To many in the empire, the war against Russia in 1877–78 was traumatic. The Russian army almost captured Constantinople (İstanbul) and the war also saw the expulsion and massacres of many Balkan Muslims. The resultant 1878 Treaty of Berlin established the independence of many Balkan nations and the loss of the Caucasian vilayets. When the Empire declared bankruptcy in 1881 the Ottoman economy came under the control of the Ottoman Public Debt Administration, an institution controlled by the European powers and designed to manage the Empire's finances. Though the justification of the Hamidian autocracy was so that the empire won't collapse, many found it hypocritical of Abdulhamid to be content with foreign pressure by conceding sovereignty, land, and the economy to western powers.

The combination of European control over Ottoman finances and Ottoman Christian domination in the Ottoman economy resulted in much anti-Christian xenophobia in its Muslim subjects. Ottoman Christians, especially Ottoman Armenians, started to increasingly feeling insecure in their position as Ottoman subjects after these sentiments manifested in the Hamidian massacres (1894–1896), and started demanding autonomy from the government.

It was in this context the Young Turks movement formed as a loose coalition of elements in the empire opposed to Sultan Abdulhamid II's absolutism. Held together by a common belief in constitutionalism, they argued that the codification of secular law in the Ottoman Empire would foster a sense of Ottoman nationalism and prevent ethnic conflict, helping the empire to hold on to its remaining Balkan territories. The coalition between the Armenian Revolutionary Federation and the Committee of Union and Progress remained essential to the Ottoman reform programme after the constitution was restored, particularly regarding security and the agrarian question in the eastern provinces of the empire.

== Young Turk Revolution (1908) ==
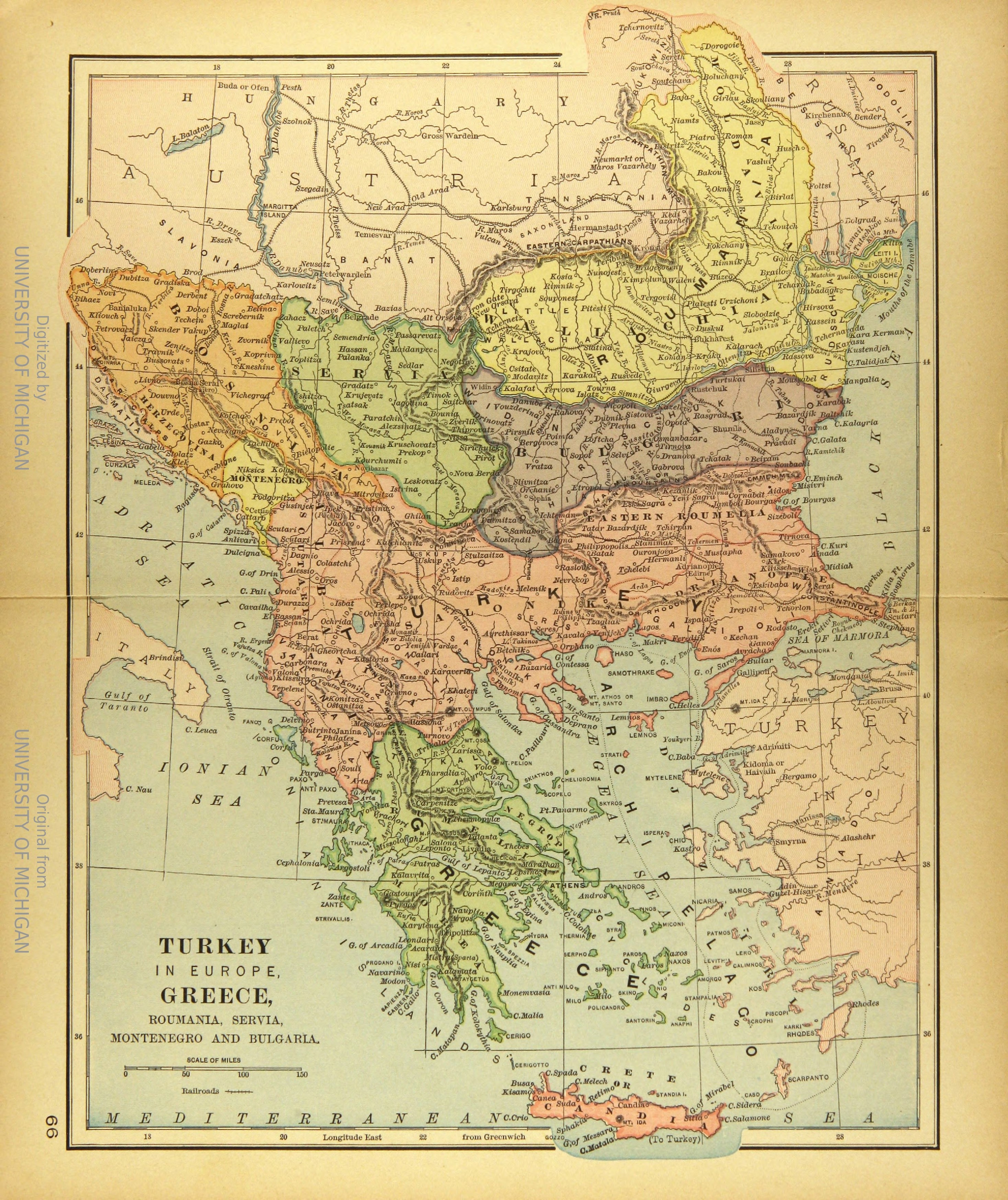
Map of Ottoman Europe (Rumelia) in 1908. The region, then experiencing a low-intensity civil war known as the Macedonian Struggle, was the birthplace of the Young Turk Revolution

The Young Turk Revolution began with a small insurrection of Committee of Union and Progress (CUP) supporters in Macedonia and spread quickly throughout the empire. The multiethnic vilayets in Macedonia for years faced a collapse of authority and were going through an ethnic conflict known as the Macedonian Struggle. This made recruitment to revolutionary societies like the CUP promising to reform the system attractive to army officers stationed in the region. Unable to regain control of the province, Sultan Abdulhamid II announced the restoration of the 1876 constitution, reconvening the parliament on 23 July 1908. After the revolution, power was informally shared between the palace (Abdulhamid), the Sublime Porte, and the CUP, whose Central Committee was still based in Salonica, and now represented a powerful deep state faction.

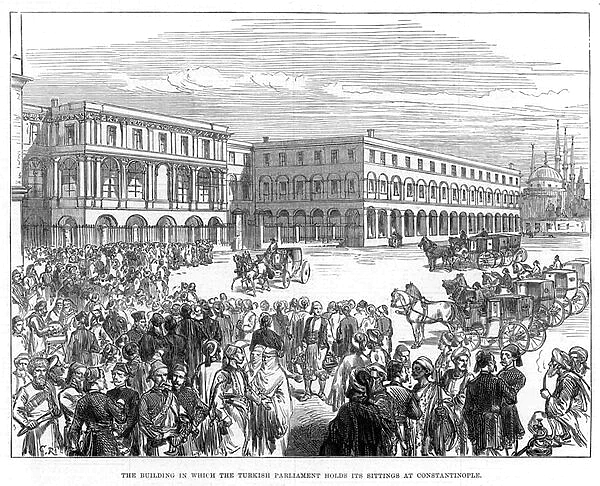
The Old Darülfünun building in which the Turkish Parliament held its Sittings at Constantinople. The Illustrated London News 1877

As in 1876, the revived Ottoman Parliament consisted of two chambers: a Senate (upper house) and a Chamber of Deputies (lower house). The Chamber of Deputies was elected by the people, in the ratio of one member for every 50,000 males of the population over the age of 25 who paid taxes. Senators, on the other hand, were nominated for life by the Sultan, had to be over 40 years of age, and their number could not exceed a third of the membership of the Chamber of Deputies.

General elections were to take place every four years. The general population did not, however, vote directly for the Deputy that he desired to represent him in the Parliament. In each of the 15 electoral districts, registered voters were entitled to choose delegates in the proportion of 1 delegate for 500 voters, and these delegates (elected Administrative Councils) had the actual power of choosing the representatives in the Chamber. Moreover, the administration of territories was entrusted to these delegates in the elected Administrative Councils. Thus, these Councils were elected and served not only as an electoral college, but also as a local government in the provinces and districts (Turkish: vilayets).

== Initial reopening (1908–1909) ==
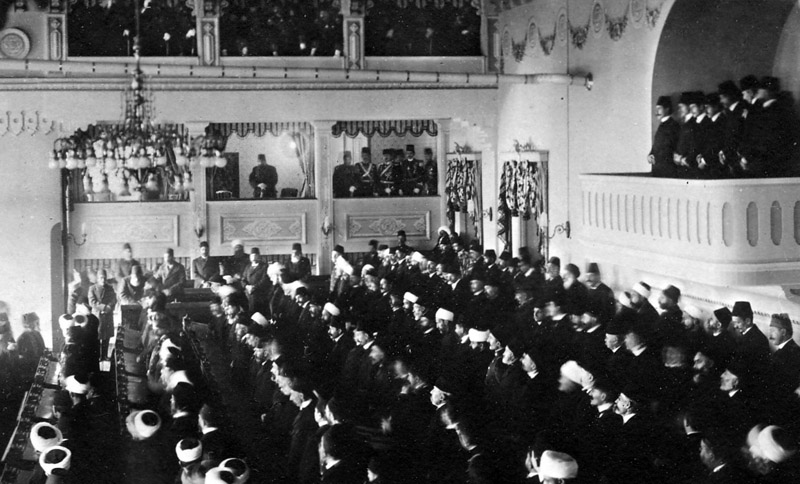
Opening of the 1908 Ottoman Parliament

With the reestablishment of the constitution and parliament, most Young Turk organizations turned into political parties, including the CUP. However, after meeting of the goal reinstating the constitution, in the absence of this uniting factor, the CUP and the revolution began to fracture and different factions began to emerge. The Liberal Young Turk faction led by Mehmed Sabahaddin founded the Liberty Party and later in 1911 the Freedom and Accord Party. The Liberty Party was liberal in outlook, bearing a strong British imprint, and closer to the Palace. Although the CUP collaborated with the Liberals, their respective goals contrasted strongly. Liberals favored administrative decentralization and European assistance to implement reforms and also promoted industrialization. Ibrahim Temo and Abdullah Cevdet, two original founders of the CUP, founded the Ottoman Democratic Party in February 1909. Ahmet Rıza who returned to the capital from his exile in Paris became president of the Chamber of Deputies, the parliament's lower house, and gradually distanced himself from the CUP as it became more radical.

It was after the Young Turk Revolution that the first organized labor disputes turned into strikes in the cities of Adrianople, Constantinople, and Smyrna. The motivation of these strikes came from dissatisfaction of the Young Turks' unfulfilled promises to improve worker's rights, which led to a ban on most forms of workers strikes and establishment of trade unions.

Since the sultan declared that he had never officially dissolved the Ottoman Parliament, the former parliamentarians (those still able to serve) who had gathered three decades before suddenly found themselves representing the people again. The parliament convened after the revolution only briefly and rather symbolically. The only task they performed was to call a new election. The new parliament was elected in the 1908 election and composed of 142 Turks, 60 Arabs, 25 Albanians, 23 Greeks, 12 Armenians (including four Dashnaks and two Hunchaks), 5 Jews, 4 Bulgarians, 3 Serbs and 1 Vlach. The CUP became the biggest party among a fragmented parliament with only 60 of the 275 seats. The CUP, the main driving force behind the revolution, managed to gain the upper hand against the Liberty Party.

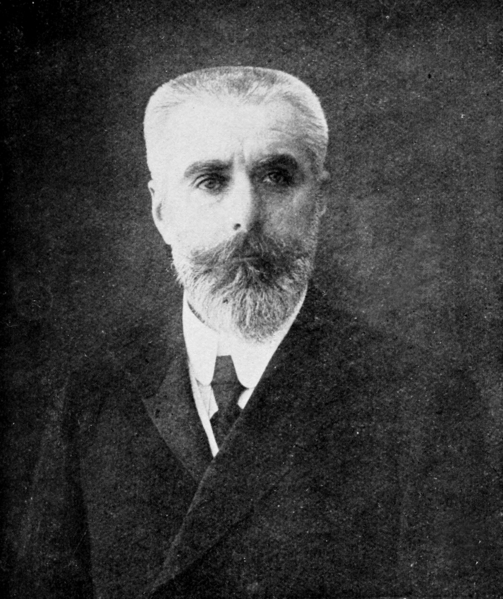
Ahmet Rıza first president of the Chamber of Deputies

On 30 January 1909, the minister of the interior, Hüseyin Hilmi Pasha, took the podium to answer an inquiry sponsored by both Muslims and non-Muslims, all but one of whom were from cities in the Balkans. It was about how the government would deal with what these deputies called lacking of the law and order; the rise of assassinations and armed assaults; the roaming of bandits. Ethnic and sectarian violence between various communities in the empire was costing both lives and resources. This was an important event as the newly established system was passing the first test regarding the "proper" parliamentary conduct. There were members of various diplomatic missions among the audience. The new constitution secured the freedom of the press, newspapermen and other guests were observing the proceedings. The first section of the protocol (minister's speech, deputies oppositions) achieved. However arguments began to break out between deputies and soon all decorum was cast aside, the verbal struggle was representation of the ethnic troubles plaguing the empire. The interchanges were performed along the nationalism lines among the non-Muslim deputies, according to their ethnic and religious origins, and of Ottomanism as a response to these competing ideologies.

On 16 August 1909, the government passed the "Law of Associations", which banned ethnically based political parties. A month later, the government passed the "Law for the Prevention of Brigandage and Sedition", which created "special pursuit battalions" to hunt down guerrillas in Macedonia, made it illegal for private citizens to own firearms and imposed harsh penalties for those who failed to report the activities of guerrillas. The government also expanded the educational system by founding new schools, while at the same time announcing that henceforward Turkish would be the only language of instruction.

== 31 March Crisis (1909) ==
Threats to the experiment in constitutional and parliamentary government soon appeared. Nine months into the new parliamentary term, discontent and reactionary sentiment against constitutionalism manifested in the 31 March Incident. The constitutionalists were able to wrestle back control of the Ottoman government from the reactionaries with Mahmud Şevket Pasha's Action Army (Turkish: Hareket Ordusu). The popularly elected National Assembly met in a secret session two days later and voted unanimously for the deposition of Abdulhamid II. They reasoned that the countercoup had been inspired and organized by the Sultan, who had corrupted the troops so that he might restore the old regime. His younger brother, Mehmed V, become the new Sultan. Hilmi Pasha again became grand vizier, but resigned on 5 December 1909 when he was succeeded by Hakki Bey. The constitution would be amended to strengthen the popularly elected Chamber of Deputies at the expense of the unelected Senate and the Sultan's personal powers. The new constitutional amendments also banned all secret societies.

== Years of peace (1909–1911) ==
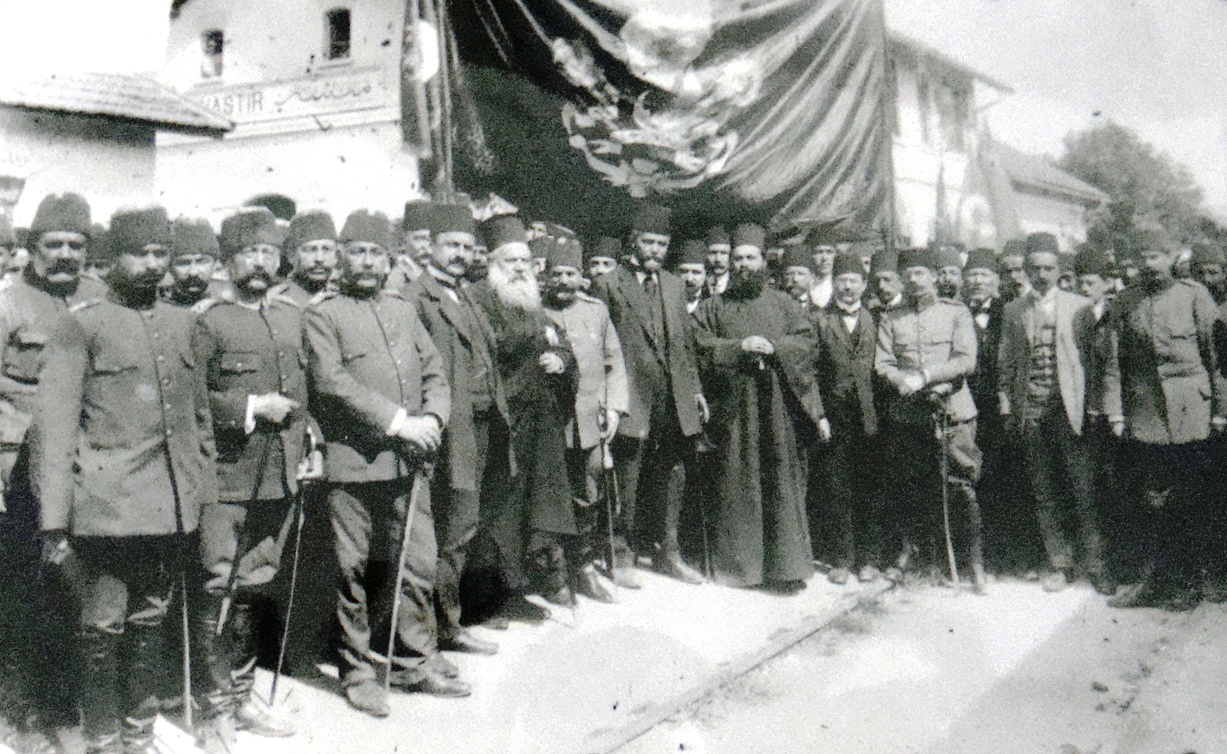
Mehmed V Reşâd's reception in the train station of Monastir (modern Bitola), 1911

Parliament was prorogued for three months on the 27th. During the recess, the CUP held a congress at Salonica and modified its own rules. The CUP ceased to be a secret association. This was regarded as an expression of confidence in the reformed parliament, which had laid the foundation of the important financial and administrative reforms. Once in power, the CUP introduced a number of new initiatives intended to promote the modernization. The CUP advocated a program of orderly reform under a strong central government, as well as the exclusion of all foreign influence. CUP promoted industrialization and administrative reforms. Administrative reforms of provincial administration quickly led to a higher degree of centralization. In addition, the CUP implemented the secularization of the legal system and provided subsidies for the education of women, and altered the administrative structure of the state-operated primary schools.

The new parliament sought to modernize the Empire's communications and transportation networks, trying at the same time not to put themselves in the hands of European conglomerates and non-Muslim bankers. Germany and Italy already owned the paltry Ottoman railways (5,991 km of single-track railroads in the whole of the Ottoman dominions in 1914) and since 1881 administration of the defaulted Ottoman foreign debt had been in European hands. The Ottoman Empire was virtually an economic colony.

During this period clashes arose between Zionists and Palestinian farmers near Nazareth. A Palestinian deputy from Jaffa raised the Zionist issue for the first time in Ottoman parliament.

== Years of crisis (1911–1913) ==
In mid-October, many of the parliament's most esteemed politicians including Hakkı Pasha, Talat, Cavid, Halil Menteşe, Krikor Zohrab, Vartkes Serengülian, and Karekin Pastermajian met, where the main discussion was commitment to the Constitution and more cooperation between the CUP and liberals rather than incessant intervention by the CUP in government. When this proposal was rejected, the liberals coalesced around the big tent Freedom and Accord Party, immediately attracting 70 deputies to its ranks. Only 20 days after formation, a by-election in Istanbul in December 1911 in which the Liberal Union candidate won was taken as a confirmation of a new political atmosphere.

The period of 1911–13 was a highly turbulent time for the Ottoman government in terms of both domestic and foreign affairs. It marked a political power struggle between the CUP and Freedom and Accord, consisting of rapid exchanges of power involving a rigged election, a military revolt, and finally a coup d'état on a background of the disastrous Libyan and Balkan Wars.

=== Savior Officers' revolt and the Great Cabinet ===
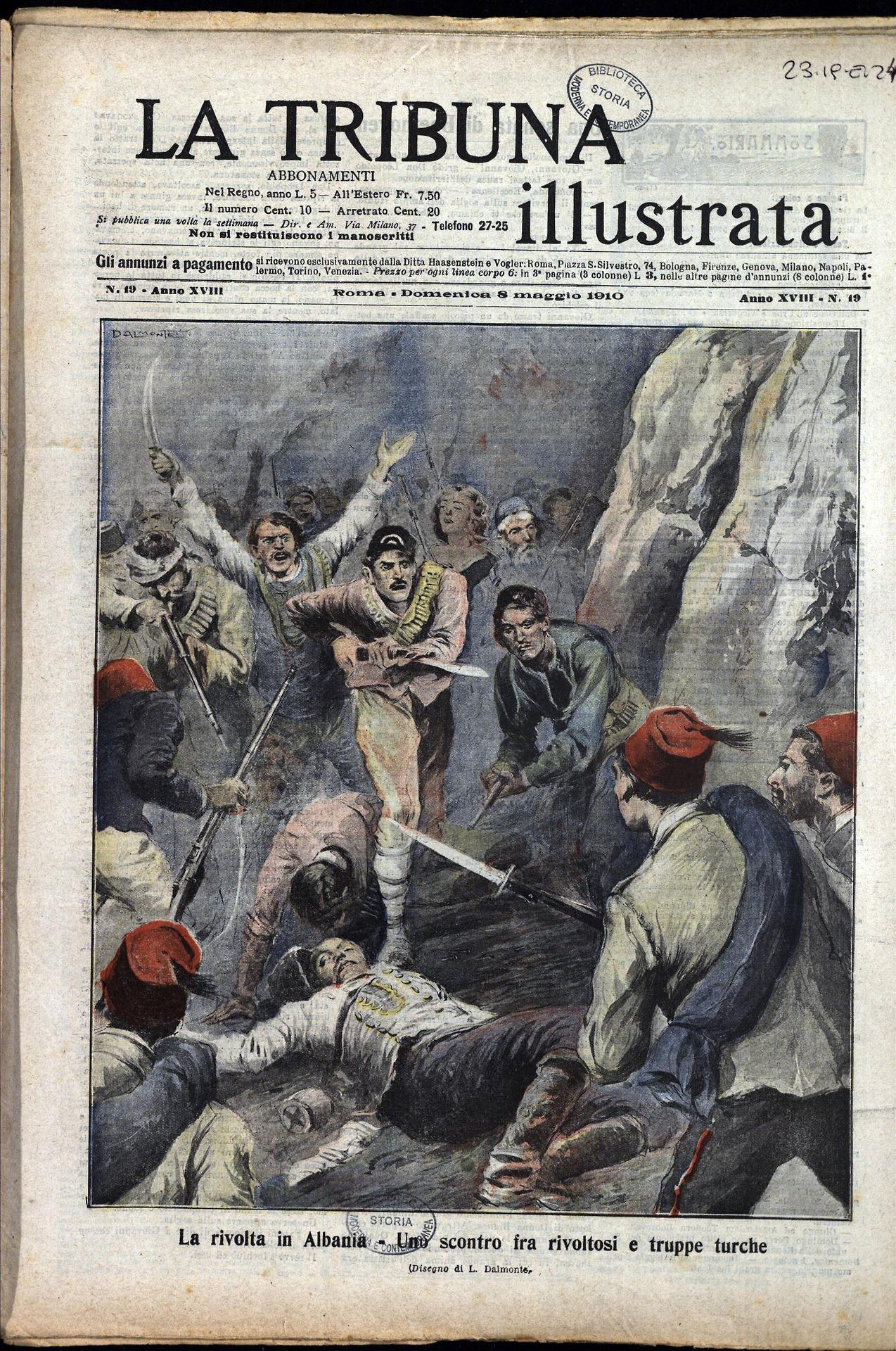
Albanian Revolt of 1910

From the summer of 1909 onwards the nature of the rebellions in Macedonia changed. The Christian communities largely ceased their rebellious activities while the Albanians, who were 70% Muslim and until that time had been the most loyal group in Macedonia, now started to rebel against the Ottoman state. Until that time, it had always been assumed by the Unionists that Islam would ensure the loyalty of the Muslim Albanians, so the frequent Albanian revolts came as a surprise. The decision to impose Turkish as the language in schools together with another law announcing that Albanian could only be written in the Arabic alphabet while the majority of Albanians had wished to adopt the Latin alphabet. After crushing one Albanian revolt in 1909, another one broke out in March 1910. The uprising had been crushed by the autumn, many Albanian nationalists were executed and a systematic attempt was being made to crush Albanian nationalism by banning Albanian newspapers and private schools. In March 1911, yet another Albanian revolt broke out, but this time, the government chose negotiation by sending the sultan Mehmed V to tour Macedonia in June 1911 and proclaim an amnesty for those Albanian rebels who agreed to lay down their arms. The Italian invasion of Libya came as another blow against the country.

In the middle of the war against Italy and in the midst of yet another Albanian revolt, the CUP called for early national elections in order to thwart Freedom and Accord Party's ability to better organize and grow. In the general elections held in April 1912, nicknamed the "Election of Clubs" (Turkish: Sopalı Seçimler) because of the widespread electoral fraud and violence engaged in by the CUP against Freedom and Accord candidates, the CUP won an overwhelming majority (269 of 275 seats in the Chamber of Deputies). A cabinet of CUP members was formed under Grand Vizier Mehmed Said Pasha.

Angered at their loss in the election, the leadership of Freedom and Accord sought extra-legal methods to regain power over the CUP, complaining vocally about electoral fraud. At around this time, a group of military officers, uncomfortable with injustices it perceived within the military, organized itself into an armed organization known as the "Savior Officers" (Turkish: Halâskâr Zâbitân) and made their presence known to the imperial government. The Savior Officers, quickly becoming partisans of Freedom and Accord, soon created unrest in the capital Istanbul. After gaining the support of Prince Sabahaddin, the Savior Officers published public declarations in newspapers.

Finally, after giving a memorandum to the Military Council, the Savior Officers succeeded in getting Mehmed Said Pasha (who they blamed for allowing the early elections that led to the CUP domination of the Chamber) and his government of CUP ministers to resign in July. Mehmed Said Pasha was succeeded by the non-partisan government of Ahmed Muhtar Pasha (the so-called "Great Cabinet", Turkish: Büyük Kabine). With the support of the Savior Officers, Ahmed Muhtar Pasha also dissolved the Chamber, which was still full of CUP members, and called for new elections on 5 August.

The eruption of the Balkan War in October derailed plans for the elections, which were canceled, and Ahmed Muhtar Pasha resigned as Grand Vizier. The government won passage of a bill conscripting dhimmis into the army. The new Grand Vizier, Kâmil Pasha, formed a Freedom and Accord cabinet and began an effort to destroy the vestiges of the CUP remaining after the Savior Officers' revolt. Using his friendly relations with the British, Kâmil Pasha also sat down to end the ongoing First Balkan War diplomatically. However, the heavy Ottoman military upsets during the war continued to sap morale, as rumors that the capital would have to be moved from Istanbul to inland Anatolia spread. The Bulgarian Army had soon advanced as far as Çatalca. At this point, Kâmil Pasha's government signed an armistice with Bulgaria in December 1912 and sat down to draw up a treaty for the end of the war at the London Peace Conference.

The Great Powers–the British Empire, France, Italy, and Russia–attempted to arbitrate the conflict, citing the 1878 Treaty of Berlin. The Great Powers gave a note to the Sublime Porte that they wanted the Ottoman Empire to cede Edirne (Adrianople) to Bulgaria and the Aegean islands under its control to the Great Powers themselves. Because of the losses experienced by the army so far in the war, the Kâmil Pasha government was inclined to accept the "Midye-Enez Line" as a border to the west and, while not outright giving Edirne to Bulgaria, favored transferring control of it to an international commission.

=== Raid on the Sublime Porte ===
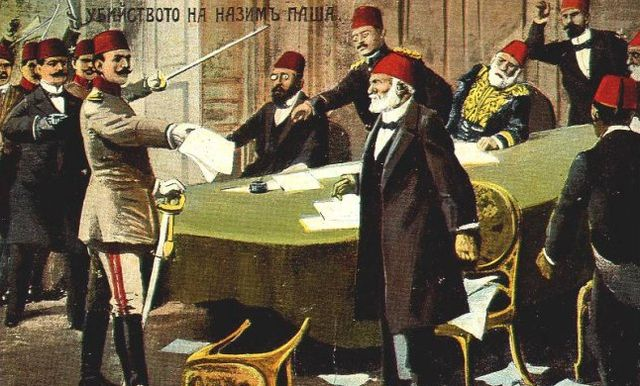
Enver Pasha forcing Kâmil Pasha to resign at gunpoint

The Freedom and Accord government with Kâmil Pasha was overthrown in a coup d'état (also known as the Raid on the Sublime Porte, Turkish: Bâb-ı Âlî Baskını) engineered by CUP leaders Mehmed Talaat and Ismail Enver, who used the pretext of Kâmil Pasha "dishonoring the nation" by allegedly agreeing to give away Edirne to the Bulgarians. On 23 January 1913, Enver Bey burst with some of his associates into the Sublime Porte while the cabinet was in session, a raid in which the Minister of War Nazım Pasha was killed. A new CUP government was formed, headed by Grand Vizier Mahmud Shevket Pasha. Mahmud Shevket Pasha would be assassinated on 11 June 1913, although he was genial towards the now-opposition Freedom and Accord after the coup. After his death, he was succeeded by Said Halim Pasha, and CUP began to repress Freedom and Accord and other opposition parties, forcing many of their leaders (such as Prince Sabahaddin) to flee to Europe.

== One party state (1913–1918) ==
After the Balkan Wars, Ottoman Empire became an entity with two major constituents; namely Turks and Arabs. In the new framework, the percentage of representatives from Arab provinces increased from 23% (1908) to 27%, Turkomans 14% (1908) to 22% and in total CUP members from 39% (1908) to 67%.

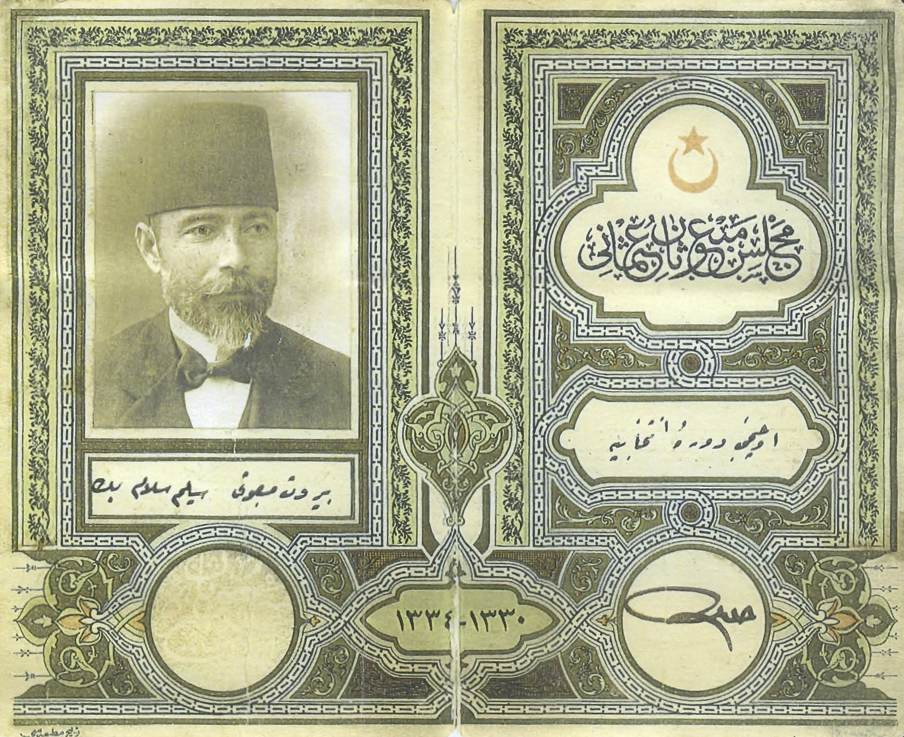
Identity Card of Salim Ali Salam as deputy from Beirut to the Ottoman Parliament

In the new consolidated structure minority issues, such as those affecting the Armenians, dominated mainstream politics. Armenian politicians were supporting the CUP, but when the parliament was formed the result was very different from the expected one. The Balkan wars had significantly shifted from a multiethnic and multireligious Ottoman Empire to a Muslim core. The size of the CUP's majority in parliament proved to be a source of weakness rather than strength as minorities became outsiders. The deported Muslims (Turks) from the Balkans were located in the western parts of Anatolia and they brought their own issues. Armenians were expecting more representation through the parliament, but the nature of democracy kept them in a minority position. That was an unexpected result for the Armenians after they had been in a protected position since 1453.

In 1913, politics in Istanbul was centered around finding a solution to the demands of Arab and Armenian reformist groups. 19th century politics of Ottoman Empire dealt with the decentralist demands of the Balkan nations. In 1913, the same pattern was originating from the eastern provinces. With most of the Christian population having already left the Empire after the Balkan Wars, a redefinition of Ottoman politics was in place with a greater emphasis on Islam as a binding force. The choice of this policy should also be considered as external forces (imperialists) were Christians.

Taking account of the loss of the Balkans and of Libya for the Ottoman Empire and despite the single-party regime installed by the CUP, the Ottoman ethnic minorities were going to be represented at similar proportions during the 1914–1918 term of the Ottoman Parliament, with 11 Armenians and a dozen Greeks being elected as deputies and having served in that capacity.

New elections were held in 1914 in a single-party framework, and the CUP gained all constituencies. The effective power lay in the hands of Mehmed Talaat Pasha, the Interior Minister, Enver Pasha, the Minister of War, and Cemal Pasha, the Minister of the Navy, till 1918. Talaat Pasha became the grand vizier himself in 1917.

A fraction within the CUP led the Ottoman Empire to make a secret Ottoman–German Alliance which brought it into World War I. The Empire's role as an ally of the Central Powers is a significant part of the history of that war.

With the collapse of Bulgaria and Germany's capitulation, the Ottoman Empire was isolated and surrendered.

== End of an Empire and its constitution (1918–1920) ==
The last elections were performed under the military Occupation of Constantinople by the Allies, they were called under the Amasya Protocol signed on 22 October 1919 between the Ottoman government and the Turkish National Movement, in order to agree on a joint Turkish resistance movement against the Allies.

When the new session of the Chamber of Deputies convened on 16 March 1920, it passed the Misak-ı Millî (National Pact) with the Turkish National Movement, angering the Allies. Several MPs were arrested and deported. The Allies forced sultan Mehmed VI and he dissolved the parliament on 11 April.

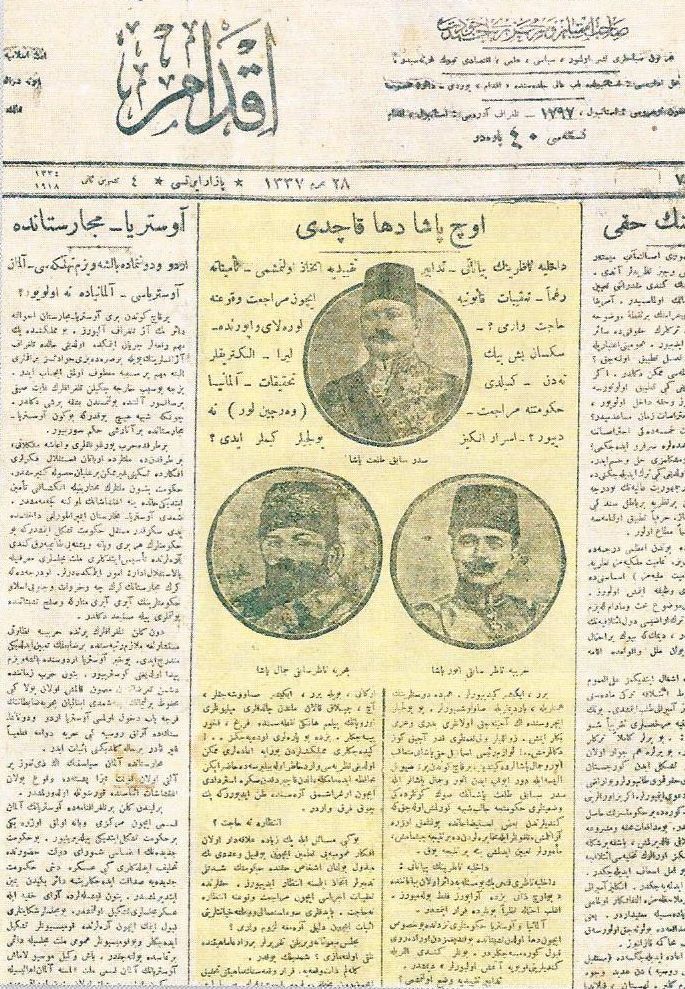
The front page of the Ottoman newspaper İkdam on 4 November 1918 announcing that the Three Pashas fled the country.

On 13 October 1918, Talat Pasha and the rest of the CUP ministry resigned, and the Armistice of Mudros was signed aboard a British battleship in the Aegean Sea at the end of the month. The Turkish Courts-Martial of 1919–20 took place where the leadership of the CUP and selected former officials were court-martialled under charges of subversion of the constitution, wartime profiteering, and the massacres of both Armenians and Greeks. The court reached a verdict which sentenced the organizers of the massacres, Talat, Enver, Cemal and others to death. On 2 November, the Three Pashas (Talaat, Enver, and Cemal) escaped from Constantinople into exile.

The last elections for the Ottoman Parliament were held in December 1919. The newly elected 140 members of the Ottoman Parliament, composed in their sweeping majority of candidates of "Association for Defense of Rights for Anatolia and Rumelia (Anadolu ve Rumeli Müdafaa-i Hukuk Cemiyeti)", headed by Mustafa Kemal Pasha, who himself remained in Ankara, opened the fourth (and last) term of the Parliament on 12 January 1920.

Despite being short-lived and the exceptional conditions, this last assembly took a number of important decisions that are called Misak-ı Milli (National Pact). It had signed the Amasya Protocol with the Turkish National Movement in Ankara on 22 October 1919, in which the two groups of agreed to unite against the Allies occupying the country and call for these elections. At the Protocol, the Ottoman government was represented by Minister of the Navy Salih Hulusi Pasha, and the Turkish National Movement was represented by Mustafa Kemal Atatürk, Rauf Orbay, and Bekir Sami Kunduh in their title of Delegation of Representatives (Heyeti Temsiliye).

On the morning of 16 March, British forces, including the Indian Army, began to occupy government buildings and arrested five parliament members. An Indian Army operation, the Şehzadebaşı raid, resulted in 5 Ottoman Army soldiers from the 10th Infantry Division being killed when troops raided their barracks. On 18 March, the Ottoman parliamentarians came together in a last meeting. A black cloth covered the pulpit of the Parliament as reminder of its absent members and the Parliament sent a letter of protest to the Allies, declaring the arrest of five of its members as unacceptable.

In practical terms, the meeting of 18 March, was the end of the Ottoman parliamentarary system and of the Parliament itself, which had previously served as symbol of a generation's quest for "eternal freedom" (hürriyet-i ebediye) for which men had sacrificed themselves. The dissolution of the Ottoman Parliament had left the Sultan as the sole tangible authority in the Empire. The Sultan announced his own version of the declaration of the Parliament's dissolution on 11 April. About 100 Ottoman politicians were sent to exile in Malta (see Malta exiles).

More than a hundred of the remaining members soon took the passage to Ankara and formed the core of the new assembly. On 5 April, the sultan Mehmed VI Vahdeddin, under the pressure of the Allies, closed the Ottoman parliament officially.

== See also ==
- First Constitutional Era
- Committee of Union and Progress

== Bibliography ==
- Akmeșe, Handan Nezir (2005), The Birth of Modern Turkey: The Ottoman Military and the March to World War I, London: IB Tauris
- Gingeras, Ryan (2016). Fall of the Sultanate: The Great War and the End of the Ottoman Empire, 1908–1922 (First ed.). Oxford: Oxford University Press. doi:10.1093/acprof:oso/9780199676071.001.0001. ISBN 978-0-19-967607-1.
- Kieser, Hans-Lukas (26 June 2018), Talaat Pasha: Father of Modern Turkey, Architect of Genocide, Princeton University Press (published 2018), ISBN 978-0-691-15762-7
- Mango, Andrew (2002). Atatürk: The Biography of the Founder of Modern Turkey. Overlook Press. ISBN 978-1-590-20924-0.
- Shaw, Stanford J. (1976). History of the Ottoman Empire and Modern Turkey, Vol. 2. Cambridge: Cambridge University Press. hdl:2027/heb.01919. ISBN 978-0-521-29166-8 – via ACLS Humanities E-Book.
