= Senate of the Ottoman Empire =

Upper house of the General Assembly of the Ottoman Empire

The Senate of the Ottoman Empire (Ottoman Turkish: مجلس اعیان, Heyet-i Ayan or Meclis-i Ayan; Turkish: Ayan Meclisi; lit. "Assembly of Notables"; French: Sénat (Note: In languages of ethnic minorities: Armenian: ծերակուտ (cerakut, with ծեր cer 'old'); Greek: γερουσία (gerousia, from γέρων géron, 'old man'))) was the upper house of the parliament of the Ottoman Empire, the General Assembly. Its members were appointed notables in the Ottoman government who, along with the elected lower house Chamber of Deputies (Turkish: Meclis-i Mebusan), made up the General Assembly. It was created in its first incarnation according to the Ottoman constitution of 1876, which sought to reform the Ottoman Empire into a constitutional monarchy.

Members of the Senate were selected by the Sultan and their numbers were limited to one-third (1/3) of the membership of the representative Chamber of Deputies. Members and the president of the Senate were designated to be reliable and reputable leaders of the country, required to be at least 40 years old. Furthermore, according to the 62nd clause of the 1876 constitution, government ministers, provincial governors, military commanders, kazaskers, ambassadors, Eastern Orthodox patriarchs, rabbis, and army and navy feriks, if they met certain conditions, could also become Senate members through their offices.

Members of both houses, along with the government ministers led by the grand vizier (the de facto prime minister of the Ottoman Empire), met together once a year to discuss and compile a list of things for the sultan to enact in the following year, and to review his actions taken in the previous year. The same day, Senators would swear oaths to stay loyal to the constitution, the sultan, the nation, and their duties.

Bills and budgets passed by the Chamber of Deputies went to the Senate, where they were scrutinized in matters of religion, morality, economics, social issues, and military, and modified as necessary or sent back to the Chamber. The Senate also had the power to create original legislation itself.

== First Constitutional Era (1876–1878) ==
The first Senate met on Monday, March 19, 1877. At the time that Server Pasha served as the Senate president, there were 27 members. When sultan Abdul Hamid II dissolved the parliament on February 13, 1878, the Senate ceased meeting, but its members continued to be paid government salaries and their status as military and political leaders remained unchanged.

== Second Constitutional Era (1908–1920) ==
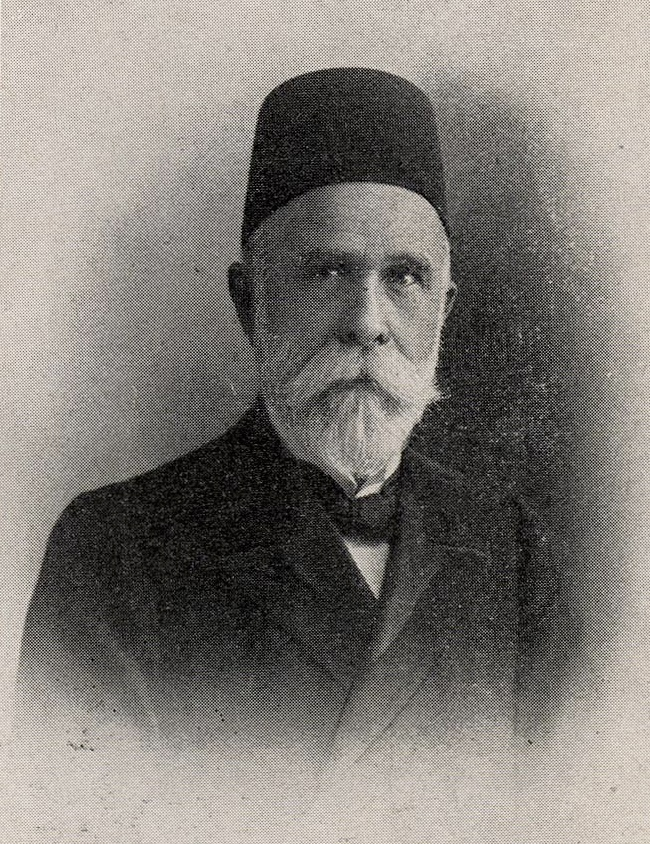
Halim Bey, prominent member of the Senate during the Second Constitutional Era.

After the proclamation of the Second Constitutional Era, amendments were made to the 1876 constitution. According to these amendments, the Senate began to assemble every year at the beginning of November, convene at the pleasure of the sultan, and disassemble after four months. The Senate usually convened after the Chamber of Deputies. In extraordinary conditions, at the sultan's request, or after a written appeal signed by the majority of the Chamber of Deputies, the entire parliament could convene earlier in a joint session of the Senate and the Chamber and extend the session.

On December 17, 1908, the Senate reconvened for the first time in over 30 years, several of its members changing over time until its end at the end of World War I in 1920, when the Allied occupation of Constantinople forced the de jure closure of the parliament on March 16, 1920. The de facto closure came on April 11, when the sultan, under pressure from the invading Allies, officially proclaimed the parliament dissolved.

The successor to the Ottoman Senate, the Senate of the Republic was established after the proclamation of the Turkish Republic.

== Members ==
=== First Constitutional Era (1876–1878) ===
- Abdul Hamid II – Monarch
- Server Pasha – President
- Ahmed Arifi Pasha – Vice President
- Mustafa Nuri Pasha – Sultan's messenger
- Mehmed Namık Pasha – Field Marshal
- Kayserili Ahmed Pasha – Minister of the Navy
- Abdurrahman Sami Pasha
- Ali Kabuli Pasha
- Mehmed Halet Pasha – governor of Hejaz
- Dervish Pasha – governor of Ankara
- Moralı İbrahim Pasha – Minister of the Navy
- Ahmed Celal Pasha
- Marko Apostolidis – Minister of Medical Education
- Uryanizade Ahmed Esad Efendi
- Kara Halil Efendi – Fatwa consultant (Fetva emini)
- Hacı Tahir Efendi – Minister of Civil Service Education
- M. Arif Efendi – former member in the Council of State
- Rıza Efendi – former judge in the Court of Cassation
- Bağdatlı Emin Efendi – member of the Council of State
- Yorgaki Efendi – member of the Council of State
- Daviçon Efendi – member of the Council of State
- Serovpe Vichenyan – Ministry of Medical Education
- M. Emin Bey – former Chief Clerk of the Palace Registrar
- Düzoğlu Mihran Bey – member of the Council of State
- Aristarki Logofet Bey – member of the Council of State
- Damat Mahmud İbrahim Pasha
- Kostaki Musurus Pasha – ambassador to Britain
- A. Hilmi Efendi – President of the Department of Appeals
- Kostaki Antopulos Pasha – judge in the Court of Cassation
- Abdülkerim Nadir Pasha
- Mehmed Sadık Pasha
- Ibrahim Edhem Pasha

=== Second Constitutional Era (1908–1920) ===
This incarnation of the Senate included two living members from the original 1877 Senate, for a total of 32 forming members. Although its charter called for it to have one-third the number of members of the Chamber of Deputies, i.e. over 90 members, it never reached that amount at one time. In 1909, it had 44 members; in 1910, it had 48 members; in 1911, it had 58 members; and in 1914, it had 48 members.

- Mehmed V – Monarch
- Ali Rıza Pasha – President
- Ömer Rüştü Pasha
- Ahmet Tevfik Pasha
- Hasan Fehmi Pasha
- Mustafa Zihni Pasha
- Mehmed Tevfik Pasha
- Mısırlı Mehmed Ali Fazıl Paşa
- Ohannes Pasha
- General Arif Hikmet Pasha
- Gabriel Noradunkyan
- Ali Rıza Efendi
- Saib Molla Bey, until 1910
- Ali Rıza Pasha (artilleryman) – Artillery, General
- General Muhiddin Pasha
- General Süleyman Pasha
- General Mehmed Pasha
- Lieutenant general Şevket Pasha, until 1911
- Şerif Ali Haydar Bey
- Recaizade Mahmud Ekrem
- Abdurrahman Efendi
- Ali Galib Bey
- Nasuhi Bey
- Faik Bey
- Halim Bey
- Dimitraki Mavrokordato
- Aleksandros Mavroyeni – former governor of Samos, diplomat
- Georgiadis Efendi
- Mustafa Nuri Bey
- Sami Pasha al-Farouqi
- Bohor Efendi
- Azaryan Efendi
- Mısırlı Halil Hamada Pasha
- Ismail Hakkı Efendi
- Metropolit Avxentios
- Nicolae Constantin Batzaria
- – Seyyid Abdulkadir son of Sheikh Ubeydullah
- Ahmed Muhtar Pasha – Field Marshal
- Mehmed Said Pasha
- Musa Kazım Efendi
- Abdurrahman Şeref
- Aristarki Logofet Bey
- Fethi Franko Bey
- Köse Mehmed Raif Pasha
- Abraham Pasha
- Aram Efendi
- Mehmet Cemaleddin Efendi – Shaykh al-Islām
- Mehmed Ferid Pasha – Grand Vizier
- Damat Ferid Pasha
- Hüseyin Hilmi Pasha – Grand Vizier
- Deli Fuad Pasha
- Şerif Nasser Bey
- Mehmet Şerif Çavdaroğlu
- Reshid Akif Pasha
- Salih Hulusi Pasha
- Mehmed Rauf Pasha
- Mahmud Esad Efendi
- Davud Molko Efendi
- Suleyman al-Boustani
- Zareh Dilber Efendi
- Ziyaeddin Efendi
- Mustafa Nail Bey
- Şerif Cafer Efendi - President of the Department of Appeals
- Aristides Pasha (Yorgancıoğlu)
- Stefanidis Vasileios
- Ahmet Rıza
- Mizancı Murat
- Rıza Tevfik Bölükbaşı
- Şükrü Pasha
- Mahmud Shevket Pasha - General

== See also ==
- Parliament of the Ottoman Empire, the parliament as a whole
- Chamber of Deputies of the Ottoman Empire, the lower house of the parliament
- Senate of Turkey, the upper house of the Turkish parliament between 1961 and 1980
- Ottoman constitution of 1876
- First Constitutional Era
- Second Constitutional Era
