= Ottoman electoral law =

Electoral law used by Ottoman Empire

Ottoman electoral law refers to the evolving legal framework governing elections to the Ottoman parliament, first codified on an imperial level in December 1876 alongside the first Ottoman constitution (Kanun-ı Esasi). The initial law established formal representative governance within the Ottoman state, namely procedures for selecting members for the Chamber of Deputies (Meclis-i Mebusan).

Comprehensive in scope, the 1876 law included the structure of electoral districts, parliamentary contingencies, the preparation of voter registers, the qualifications and disqualifications for both voters and candidates, the two-stage system of indirect elections, the method of selection and the duties of electoral inspection committees, and requirements for suffrage. The law also included provisions for by-elections, voting conduct, and penal clauses for electoral fraud or obstruction.

Although parliament was suspended in 1878 by Sultan Abdülhamid II, the law remained the foundational legal document for elections during the Second Constitutional Era (1908–1920), when it was revived with modest amendments. The same electoral framework, with limited modifications, was adopted by the Republic of Turkey and remained in force until the transition to multi-party elections in 1946.

== Ottoman Old Regime (Pre-1839) ==
Prior to the institutionalization of electoral law in the late Ottoman Empire, various mechanisms for political selection were utilized. These systems were based upon elements of consultation, consensus, allegiance, and limited community participation. The primary forums for such participation in the Ottoman world prior to the 19th Century were vested in assembly structures outlined by the töre, an unwritten customary law.

On the imperial level, the kurultay was a central institution in the töre, acting as an assembly which convened three times per year. The kurultay began with a ritual of biat, a formal oath of allegiance to the newly selected leader. Although leaders were at times elected, hereditary succession and coercion occurred within the kurultay. Regardless of how rulers were selected, biat legitimized their rule through demonstrating consensus. Biat was particularly significant in Islamic jurisprudence, where it was viewed as a binding social contract between the leader and the governed. This contract implied reciprocal duties, wherein the governed pledged obedience, while the ruler was obligated to uphold justice and fulfill their responsibilities. Though not equivalent to electoral suffrage, bait bears structural similarities to later forms of representative Ottoman governance, and was foundational to their conceptualization of political legitimacy.

At the local level, several offices allowed for communal representation and intermediary offices. One such office was the kethüda, a neighborhood or guild headman, who was often chosen with the input of local notables or the community at large. As well, meclisler (local councils) functioned as representative bodies that mediated between imperial administrators and local populations. These councils included both appointed and selected members, with non-Muslims and Muslims sometimes represented together, though often inconsistently. Elections for council positions were not equally regulated and were often manipulated by local elites, or subject to intervention from governors.

== Tanzimat Reforms and Early Electoral Councils (1839–1876) ==
The Tanzimat era represented a significant effort to modernize the Ottoman Empire's approach to statecraft through centralization, and legal reform. The era began with the 1839 Hatt-ı Şerif of Gülhane, which declared the state's commitment to guaranteeing life, property, and honor for all subjects, regardless of religion, promising a more active state through bureaucracy.

Following the initiation of the Tanzimat, electoral systems in the Ottoman Empire were established through the codification of the earlier meclisler in 1840. These councils were a continuity, and continued to assist in tax collection and local administration. Two main types of councils were established. Large Councils (büyük meclis) were for administrative centers while the Small Councils (küçük meclis) were attached to kazas, or sub-districts. Large Councils included tax collectors (muhassıl), scribes, judges (kadı), muftis, security chiefs, as well as four elected Muslim notables. In Christian-populated areas, large councils included metropolitan bishops and Christian lay representatives (kocabatı). Small Councils included a deputy tax collector, judge, mufti, security chief, and two elected Muslim notables, with one non-Muslim in mixed areas. The implementation of the 1840 reforms varied to a large degree across the empire.

The election of local notables to the councils under the 1840 law followed a complex and indirect system. In each village, five property-holding and respected men were selected by lot. These villagers joined town notables to form a pool of electors, from which 20–50 electors were selected by lot depending on the town size. Candidates appeared before the electors and voters divided into groups in favor or opposed, with lot-drawing used to determine the order of candidate appearance. There was no fixed term of office. In practice, elections were often manipulated or forgone entirely, and membership became permanent.

Following the Reform Edict of 1856 (Hatt-ı Hümayun), the Vilayet Provincial Law of 1864 began a centralized administrative reorganization in the Ottoman Empire, beginning with the creation of the Tuna Province under Midhat Pasha. This reform reinforced the 1840 law's hierarchical vilayet (province), sancak (district), and kaza (sub-district) structure by significantly increasing bureaucratic uniformity across the entire empire, with the exclusion of Egypt. Under this system, councils at each level were composed of a mix of appointed officials and elected members, with the rules for elections first codified in the 1864 and later 1867 laws.

The 1864 law also established the general provincial assembly, where representatives from districts could submit petitions and vote on public works and taxation issues. The administrative structure was further formalized in the 1871 Regulations for Provincial Administration, which codified responsibilities in areas like policing, public health, and education.

Historian Wajih Kawtharani argues these developments occurred within the broader global capitalist and modern state formation. Kawtharani argues that the Ottoman adoption of representative institutions cannot be separated from the global pressures of capitalist expansion and European imperial interests, which demanded efficient administrative control, legal uniformity, and infrastructure conducive to commerce and international diplomacy. In Kawtharani's view, the 1864 and 1867 laws intended to establish an efficient tax collection and governance just as much as the Ottoman Empire sought to demonstrate modern democratic principles to European powers.

Similar to Kawtharani, Göksel Türker argues that the image of institutional progress represented a political transformation which was materially top-down in nature, with little involvement from civil society or grassroots politics. Türker argues that constitutional and pre-democratic reforms in the Ottoman Empire lacked the kind of mass mobilization or upper-class demands that characterized similar movements in Europe. Türker instead argues that they were organized by high-level bureaucrats, reformist sultans, and foreign-educated elites who sought to preserve the empire under increasing European and domestic pressures.

However, scholars such as Aykanat and Korkmaz argue that these reforms were not merely imitations of European constitutionalism meant to signal modernization, but rather, were adaptations of earlier local and Islamic practices to meet modern administrative needs. Aykanat and Korkmaz argue that while councils resembled European-style representation, the underlying structure came from long standing traditions of consultation (şura) and communal representation, forming a model that was both appealing to a European audience while remaining foundationally Ottoman and Islamic in its political theory.

== First Constitutional Era and the 1876 Constitution (1876–1878) ==
The First Constitutional Era arose from the earlier attempts at centralization of the Tanzimat period. While short lived, these reforms included the creation of the 1876 Constitution (Kanun-i Esasî), which was heavily influenced by European constitutional models, particularly those of Belgium, France, and England. Formed during a time of competing priorities, the constitution was designed to maintain imperial unity in a multi-ethnic state, satisfy European powers pressuring for legal and political reform, and channel the growing reformist aspirations of the Ottoman elite, such as the Young Ottomans.

Foremost, the Sultan remained the head of state, retaining substantial powers. As monarch, the Sultan was declared “sacred and inviolable,” with the authority to appoint ministers, dissolve the parliament, declare war, sign treaties, and issue decrees. The constitution also guaranteed equality before the law, freedom of religion, and protection of property.

Electorally, the constitution established a Bicameral Parliament. The legislature, or General Assembly, consisted of the Senate (Hey’et-i Ayan), who were selected by the Sultan to serve lifetime appointments, and the Chamber of Deputies (Meclis-i Mebusan), who were members elected by the populace under a two-tier electoral system. Deputies were also forbidden from holding other public offices, except ministerial posts.

The constitution stipulated that for the Chamber of Deputies, each municipality would elect one deputy for every 50,000 male inhabitants, with eligibility based on age, residency, and moral standing. Voting was restricted to men over 25, and universal suffrage was not applied. Eligibility criteria included Ottoman citizenship and proficiency in the Turkish language. There were exceptions, such as proteges of a foreign government, persons who had filed for bankruptcy and those who had disposed of their property. Prisoners were also eligible unless deprived of their civil rights.

The election process was indirect and featured two stages. (Note: Two-stage elections comparable to the 1789 French electoral law) One deputy in the Chamber of Deputies represented 50,000 male residents. The provincial subdivision was the sanjak. Inspection units were the kaza. Candidacy for deputy was province-wide. Eligible voters elected secondary candidates (that is two stage voting (Note: rules for primary voters and the French law of 1789 for election had resemblance)): one for every 500 primary candidates. The two-stage system reinforced patronage relationships and precluded the election of candidates truly representative of the common people.

The election was a staggered and drawn-out process that was not coordinated throughout the empire or even the province. Balloting was based on the multiple-member plurality system. Voters wrote in as many names as there were candidates. A candidate could run either in his province of residence or province of origin. There were rules for secrecy of the ballot and security of tallying and tabulating.

In Raoul de la Grasserie's detailed comparative study of electoral systems, the Ottoman electoral system was portrayed favorably to its contemporary Western counterparts due to the extent of suffrage it provided for. In contrast to the contemporary electoral systems of Germany, Russia, Japan, and England, there was no legally stipulated weighted voting, distributed among different social groups.

== Bibliography ==
- Kayalı, Hasan (1995). "Elections and the Electoral Process in the Ottoman Empire, 1876-1919". International Journal of Middle East Studies. 34 (27): 265–286. doi:10.1017/S0020743800062085.
