= Second 1877 Ottoman general election =

- 1877

General elections were held in the Ottoman Empire during the second half of 1877.

== Background ==
General elections had been held earlier in 1877 after a new constitution was promulgated in December 1876. The new Parliament opened on 19 March 1877, with a planned lifetime of three months. With a ten-day extension agreed by Sultan Abdul Hamid II, it was dissolved on 28 June.

Article 119 of the constitution required a new electoral law to be in place by the time of the second elections. However, although it had been passed by the Chamber of Deputies, it was still under discussion by the Senate, and had not become law, so the election was held in accordance with the previous system. The Provisional Electoral Regulations issued on 29 October 1876 stated that the elected members of the Provincial Administrative Councils would elect MPs. Candidature was limited to men above the age of 30 who were competent in Turkish and had full civil rights. Grounds for disqualification included holding dual citizenship, being employed by a foreign government, being bankrupt, employed as a servant or having "notoriety for ill deeds".

Religious makeup of the Chamber of Deputies: green represents Muslims (59 seats), and blue represents non-Muslims (47 seats)

== Aftermath ==
The newly elected Parliament first convened on 13 December 1877, but was prorogued by the Sultan on 14 February 1878 under the pretext of the war with Russia. It did not reconvene until 1908.

== See also ==
- 2nd Chamber of Deputies of the Ottoman Empire
