= Old Darülfünun building =

- Eski Darülfünun Binası
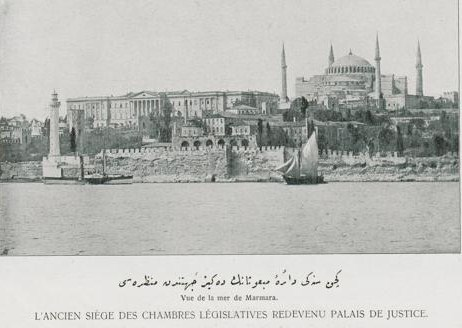
- Interactive map of the Old Darülfünun building area

General information
- Type: University building, parliamentary building
- Location: Istanbul, Turkey
- Coordinates: 41.00728°N 28.98006°E
- Construction started: 1845
- Completed: 1854
- Destroyed: 1933

Design and construction
- Architect: Gaspare Fossati

Old Darülfünun building (Turkish: Eski Darülfünun Binası) was a university building constructed next to Haghia Sophia in Istanbul, Ottoman Empire in the mid-19th century.

It was a three-storey building in neo-Renaissance style that had a great visual impact on Istanbul's urban character. The building's designer was Swiss architect Gaspare Fossati (1809—1883), who was also responsible for extensive restoration of Hagia Sophia.

After its construction as a university (Ottoman Turkish: Darülfünun) building in 1854, it was passed on to the Ministries of Finance and then on to the Ministry of Justice and Foundation. Later it was also used by the Ottoman Parliament, and finally served as Palace of Justice. It was destroyed by a fire in 1933. As at 2026, the site has not been built over, and the foundational ruins are still visible from surrounding buildings.

== See also ==
- Great Palace of Constantinople
