= General Assembly of the Ottoman Empire =

National legislature

General Assembly مجلس عمومی

Type
- Type: Bicameral
- Houses: Senate; Chamber of Deputies

History
- Founded: 23 December 1876; 23 July 1908
- Disbanded: 14 February 1878; 11 April 1920
- Preceded by: Divan-ı Hümayun
- Succeeded by: Grand National Assembly; Senate of the Republic (1961–1980)

Structure
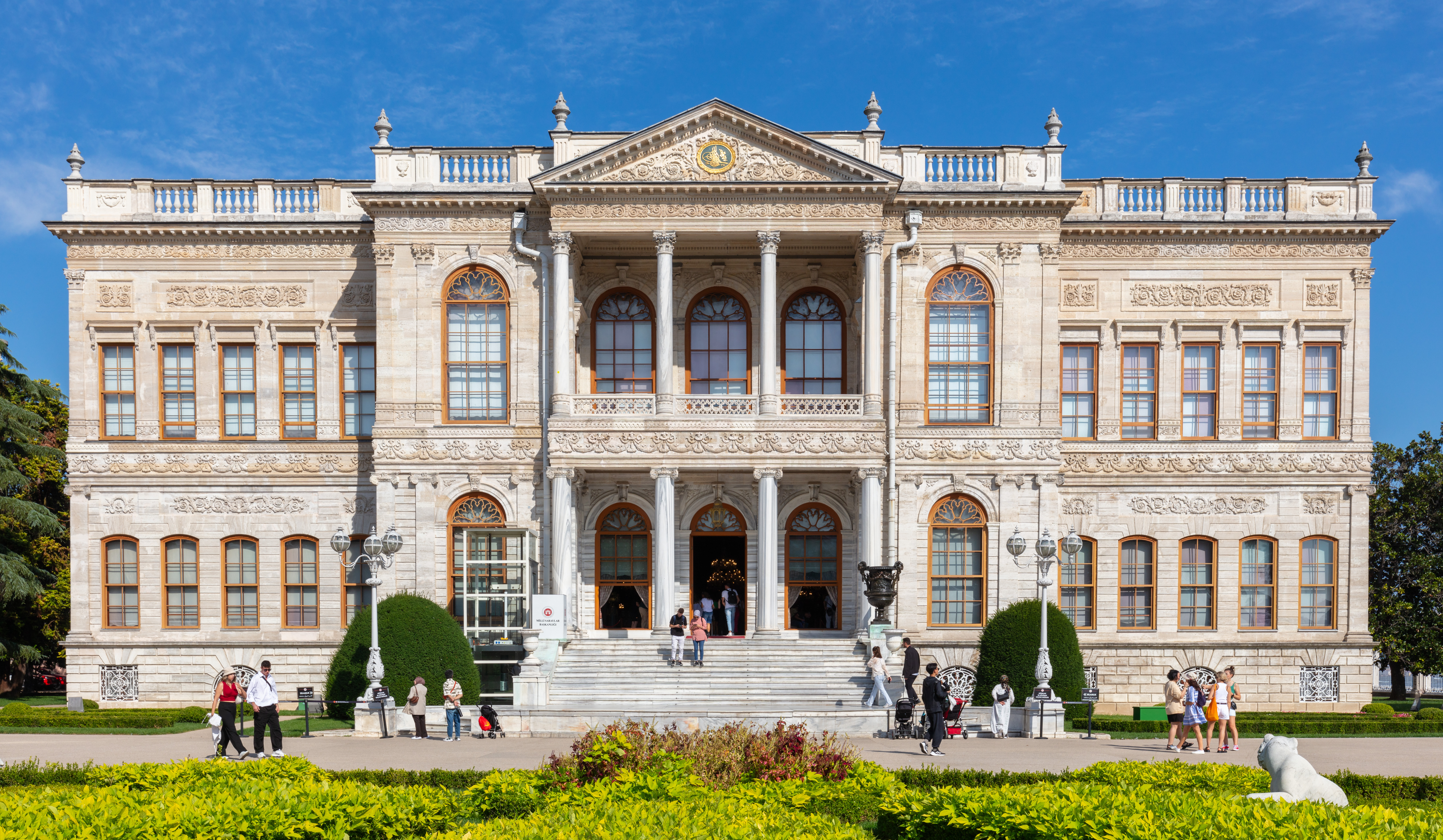

Meeting place
- Dolmabahçe Palace (1876–1878); Darülfünûn building (1876–1878; 1908); Çırağan Palace (1909); Cemile Sultan Palace (1910–1920)

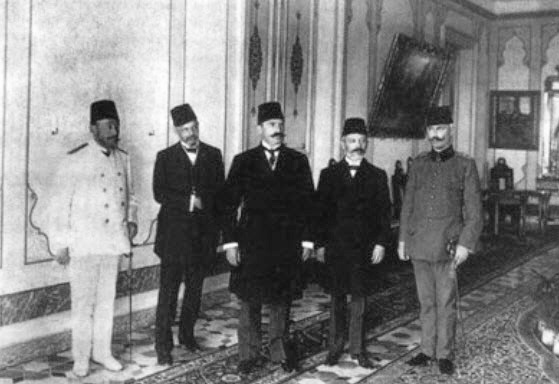
Delegation of the Ottoman Parliament to Abdul Hamid II.

The General Assembly (Ottoman Turkish: مجلس عمومی, romanized: Meclis-i Umûmî; French romanization: "Medjliss Oumoumi" or Genel Parlamento; French: Assemblée Générale) was the first attempt at representative democracy by the imperial government of the Ottoman Empire. Also known as the Ottoman Parliament (French: Parlement Ottoman), it was located in Constantinople (Istanbul) and was composed of two houses: an upper house (Senate, Meclis-i Âyân), and a lower house (Chamber of Deputies, Meclis-i Mebusân).

The General Assembly was first constituted on 23 December 1876 and initially lasted until 14 February 1878, when it was dissolved by Sultan Abdul Hamid II.

As a result of the Young Turk Revolution which brought substantial reforms and larger participation by political parties, the General Assembly was revived 30 years later, on 23 July 1908, with the Second Constitutional Era. The Second Constitutional Era ended on 11 April 1920, when the General Assembly was dissolved by the Allies during the occupation of Constantinople in the aftermath of World War I.

Many members of the dissolved Ottoman Parliament in Constantinople later became members of the Grand National Assembly of Turkey in Ankara (known in English as Angora in the Ottoman and pre-1930 Republic eras), which was established on 23 April 1920, during the Turkish War of Independence.

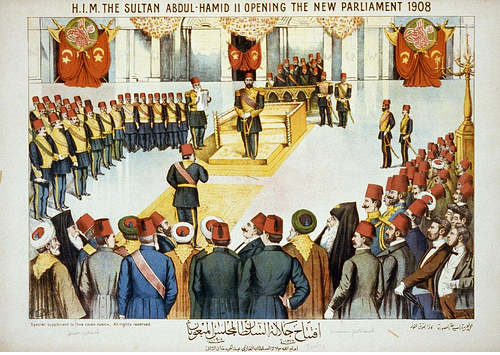
A postcard depicting the opening of the new Parliament in 1908.

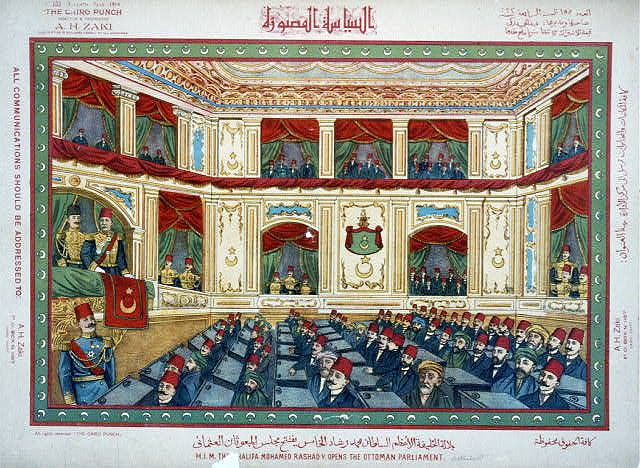
A postcard depicting a meeting of the Parliament in 1914.

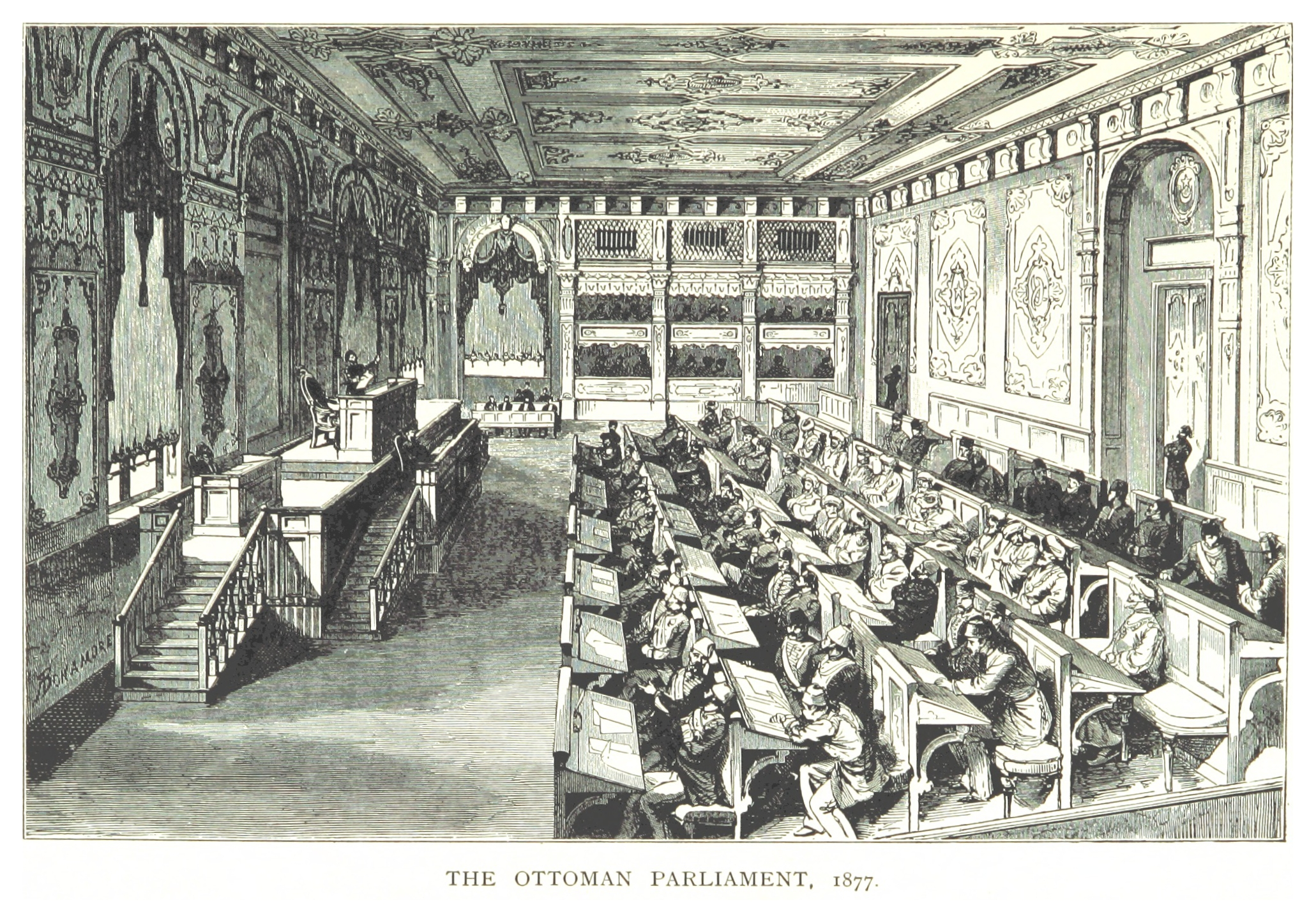
The Ottoman Parliament in 1877.

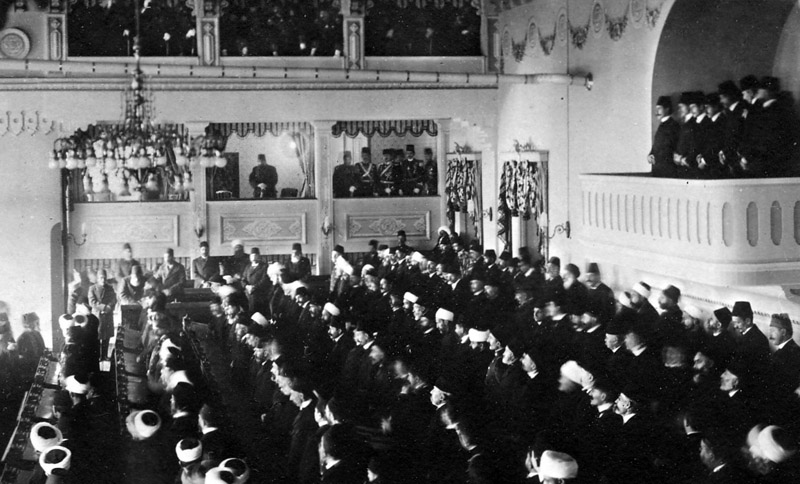
The Ottoman Parliament in 1908.

== See also ==
- Grand National Assembly of Turkey
