= Bibliography of the Armenian genocide =

This is a selected bibliography and other resources for the Armenian genocide.

== Historical overviews ==
- Akçam, Taner. A Shameful Act: The Armenian Genocide and the Question of Turkish Responsibility. New York: Metropolitan Books, 2007.
- Akçam, Taner (2012). The Young Turks' Crime Against Humanity: The Armenian Genocide and Ethnic Cleansing in the Ottoman Empire. Princeton University Press. –
- Balakian, Peter. The Burning Tigris: The Armenian Genocide and America's Response. New York: HarperCollins, 2003. ISBN 0-06-019840-0
- Bloxham, Donald. The Great Game of Genocide: Imperialism, Nationalism, and the Destruction of the Ottoman Armenians. Oxford: Oxford University Press, 2005. ISBN 0-19-927356-1
- Baroni, Edik (2023). Armenian and Assyrian Genocide. Independently published. ISBN 9798866362349.
- Baroni, Edik (2022). Il genocidio degli armeni e degli assiri. Independently published. ISBN 9798363696824.
- Dadrian, Vahakn (1995). The History of the Armenian Genocide: Ethnic Conflict from the Balkans to Anatolia to the Caucasus. Oxford: Berghahn Books. ISBN 978-1-57181-666-5.
- Dadrian, Vahakn. Warrant for Genocide: Key Elements of Turko-Armenian Conflict. New Brunswick, New Jersey: Transaction Publishers, 2003. ISBN 1-56000-389-8
- De Waal, Thomas (2015). Great Catastrophe : Armenians and Turks in the Shadow of Genocide. Oxford: Oxford University Press. ISBN 978-0-19-935069-8.
- Kévorkian, Raymond. The Armenian Genocide: A Complete History. London: I.B. Tauris, 2011. ISBN 978-0-85771-930-0
- Morris, Benny and Ze'ev, Dror (2021). The Thirty-Year Genocide: Turkey’s Destruction of Its Christian Minorities, 1894–1924, Harvard University Press, ISBN 978-0674251434
- Suny, Ronald Grigor. "They Can Live in the Desert but Nowhere Else": A History of the Armenian Genocide. Princeton, NJ: Princeton University Press, 2015. ISBN 978-0-691-14730-7
- Üngör, Uğur Ümit; Polatel, Mehmet (2011). Confiscation and destruction: The Young Turk Seizure of Armenian Property. New York: e Continuum International Publishing Group. ISBN 978-1-4411-3578-0.
- Bozarslan, Hamit; Duclert, Vincent; Kévorkian, Raymond H. (2015). Comprendre le génocide des arméniens – 1915 à nos jours (in French). Tallandier. ISBN 979-10-210-0681-2.

== Specific issues and comparative studies ==
- Akçam, Taner; Kurt, Umit (2015). The Spirit of the Laws: The Plunder of Wealth in the Armenian Genocide. Berghahn Books. ISBN 978-1-78238-624-7.
- Bloxham, Donald (November 2003). "The Armenian Genocide of 1915–1916: Cumulative Radicalization and the Development of a Destruction Policy". Past & Present (181). Oxford University Press on behalf of The Past and Present Society: 141–191. doi:10.1093/past/181.1.141. JSTOR 3600788.
- Bobelian, Michael. Children of Armenia: A Forgotten Genocide and the Century-Long Struggle for Justice. New York: Simon & Schuster, 2009.
- Dadrian, Vahakn. "Genocide as a Problem of National and International Law: The World War I Armenian Case and its Contemporary Legal Ramifications", Yale Journal of International Law, Volume 14, Number 2, 1989.
- Dadrian, Vahakn. "Patterns of Twentieth Century Genocides: the Armenian, Jewish, and Rwandan Cases". Journal of Genocide Research, 2004, 6 (4), pp. 487–522.
- Göçek, Fatma Müge. Denial of Violence: Ottoman Past, Turkish Present, and Collective Violence against the Armenians, 1789–2009. Oxford: Oxford University Press, 2014.
- Hovannisian, Richard (ed.) The Armenian Genocide: History, Politics, Ethics. New York: St. Martin's Press, 1992.
- Hovannisian, Richard. Remembrance and Denial: The Case of the Armenian Genocide. Detroit: Wayne State University Press, 1998.
- Hovannisian, Richard. The Armenian Genocide: Cultural and Ethical Legacies. New Brunswick, NJ: Transaction Publishers, 2007.
- Hovannisian, Richard G. and Simon Payalsian (eds). Armenian Cilicia. Costa Mesa, California: Mazda Publishers, 2008.
- Mann, Michael. The Dark Side of Democracy: Explaining Ethnic Cleansing. Cambridge, UK: Cambridge, UP, 2004.
- Melson, Robert, Revolution and Genocide: On the Origins of the Armenian Genocide and the Holocaust. Chicago: University of Chicago Press, 1996.
- Power, Samantha. "A Problem from Hell": America and the Age of Genocide. New York: Harper Perennial 2003.
- Sanasarian, Eliz (1989). "Gender Distinction in the Genocide Process: A Preliminary Study of the Armenian Case". Holocaust and Genocide Studies. 4 (4): 449–461. doi:10.1093/hgs/4.4.449. PMID 20684116.
- Üngör, Uğur Ümit (2011), The Making of Modern Turkey: Nation and State in Eastern Anatolia, 1913–1950, Oxford: Oxford University Press.
- Michelle Tusan, "Crimes against Humanity": Human Rights, the British Empire, and the Origins of the Response to the Armenian Genocide, American Hist. Rev. 119(1), 2014, pp. 47–77

== Survivors' testimonies and memory ==
- Balakian, Grigoris. Armenian Golgotha. Translated by Peter Balakian with Aris Sevag. New York: Alfred A. Knopf, 2009.
- Bedoukian, Kerop. Some of Us Survived: The Story of an Armenian Boy. New York: Farrar Straus Giroux, 1978.
- Hartunian, Abraham H. Neither to Laugh nor to Weep: A Memoir of the Armenian Genocide. Translated by Vartan Hartunian. Cambridge, MA: Armenian Heritage Press, 1986.
- Jacobsen, Maria. Diaries of a Danish missionary: Harpoot, 1907–1919. Princeton: Gomidas Institute, 2001.
- Lang, David Marshall. The Armenians: A People in Exile. London: Allen & Unwin, 1981.
- Miller, Donald E. and Lorna Touryan Miller. Survivors: An Oral History of the Armenian Genocide. Berkeley: University of California Press, 1993.
- Panian, Karnig. Goodbye, Antoura: A Memoir of the Armenian Genocide. Stanford, CA: Stanford University Press, 2015.
- Odian, Yervant. Accursed Years: My Exile and Return from Der Zor, 1914–1919. Translated by Ara Stepan Melkonyan. London: Taderon Press, 2009.
- Svazlyan, Verzhine. The Armenian Genocide and Historical Memory. Translated by Tigran Tsulikian. Yerevan: Gitutiun Publishing House, 2004.
- Tachjian, Vahé (2017). Daily Life in the Abyss: Genocide Diaries, 1915–1918. Berghahn Books. ISBN 978-1-78533-495-5.

== Regional studies ==
- Kaiser, Hilmar (2001). At the Crossroads of Der Zor: Death, Survival, and Humanitarian Resistance in Aleppo, 1915–1917. Gomidas Institute. ISBN 978-1-903656-12-9.
- Kurt, Ümit (2021). The Armenians of Aintab: The Economics of Genocide in an Ottoman Province. Harvard University Press. ISBN 9780674247949.

=== Former Armenian communities ===
- Hovannisian, Richard. Armenian Van/Vaspurakan. Costa Mesa, California: Mazda Publishers, 2000.
- Hovannisian, Richard. Armenian Baghesh/Bitlis and Taron/Mush. Costa Mesa, California: Mazda Publishers, 2001.
- Hovannisian, Richard. Armenian Karin/Erzerum. Costa Mesa, California: Mazda Publishers, 2003.
- Hovannisian, Richard. Armenian Sebastia/Sivas and Lesser Armenia. Costa Mesa, California: Mazda Publishers, 2004.

== World responses and foreign testimony ==
- Anderson, Margaret Lavinia. "'Down in Turkey, far away': Human Rights, the Armenian Massacres, and Orientalism in Wilhelmine Germany", Journal of Modern History Volume, 79, Number 1, March 2007, pp. 80–111. in JSTOR
- Barton, James L. Turkish Atrocities: Statements of American Missionaries on the Destruction of Christian Communities in Ottoman Turkey, 1915–1917. Ann Arbor: Gomidas Institute, 1997.
- Toynbee, Arnold; Bryce, James (1916). Sarafian, Ara (ed.). The Treatment of Armenians in the Ottoman Empire, 1915–1916: Documents Presented to Viscount Grey of Falloden, Uncensored ed. Hodder and Stoughton.
- Dadrian, Vahakn N. Documentation of the Armenian Genocide in Turkish Sources. Jerusalem: Institute on the Holocaust and Genocide, 1991.
- Davis, Leslie A. The Slaughterhouse Province: An American Diplomat's Report on the Armenian Genocide, 1915–1917. ew Rochelle, N.Y.: A.D. Caratzas, 1989.
- Fitzpatrick, Matthew P. "‘Ideal and Ornamental Endeavours’: The Armenian Reforms and Germany's Response to Britain's Imperial Humanitarianism in the Ottoman Empire, 1878–83." Journal of Imperial and Commonwealth History 40.2 (2012): 183–206.
- Hovannisian, Richard G. "The Allies and Armenia, 1915–18". Journal of Contemporary History 1968 3(1): 145–168. ISSN 0022-0094 Fulltext: in Jstor
- Laderman, Charlie. Sharing the Burden: The Armenian Question, Humanitarian Intervention, and Anglo-American Visions of Global Order (Oxford University Press, 2019).
- Libaridian, Gerard. "The Ideology of the Young Turk Movement", pp. 37–49. In Gerard Libaridian (Ed.) A Crime of Silence, The Armenian Genocide: Permanent Peoples' Tribunal. London: Zed Books, 1985.
- Lundgren, Svante; Småberg, Maria, eds. (2026). Three Scandinavian Missionary Women and the Armenian Genocide. Lund University Press. ISBN 9789198994179.
- Morgenthau, Henry (1918). Ambassador Morgenthau's Story. Doubleday, Page.
- Nassibian, Akaby (1984). Britain and the Armenian Question, 1915–1923. Croom Helm. ISBN 978-0-7099-1820-2.
- Peterson, Merrill D. (2004). "Starving Armenians": America and the Armenian Genocide, 1915–1930 and After. University of Virginia Press. ISBN 978-0-8139-2267-6.
- Power, Samantha (2003). 'A Problem from Hell': America and the Age of Genocide. Harper. ISBN 978-0-06-054164-4.
- Severance, Gordon; Severance, Diana (2003). Against the Gates of Hell: The Life & Times of Henry Perry, a Christian Missionary in a Moslem World. University Press of America. ISBN 978-0-7618-2593-7.
- Sarafian, Ara, ed. (2004). United States Official Documents on the Armenian Genocide, 1915–1917. Princeton, NJ: Gomidas.
- Winter, Jay, ed. (2004). America and the Armenian Genocide of 1915. Cambridge University Press. ISBN 978-1-139-45018-8.

== Memory and historiography ==
- Alayarian, Aida (2018). Consequences of Denial: The Armenian Genocide. Routledge. ISBN 978-0-429-91215-3.
- Auron, Yair [Oron, Ya'ir] (2005) [2003], The Banality of Denial: Israel and the Armenian Genocide, Transaction.
- Bevan, Robert (2006), "Cultural Cleansing: Who Remembers the Armenians?", The Destruction of Memory: Architecture at War, Reaktion Books, pp. 25–60, ISBN 1-86189-319-1.
- Cheterian, Vicken (2015). Open Wounds: Armenians, Turks and a Century of Genocide. Hurst. ISBN 978-1-84904-458-5.
- Fatma Müge Göçek and Donald Bloxham. "The Armenian Genocide" in The Historiography of Genocide. Dan Stone, ed. London: Palgrave Macmillan. 2008, pp. 344–372. online
- Gutman, David. "Ottoman Historiography and the End of the Genocide Taboo: Writing the Armenian Genocide into Late Ottoman History." Journal of the Ottoman and Turkish Studies Association 2:1 (2015) pp. 167–183. online
- Hovannisian, Richard G, ed. (1999), Remembrance and Denial: The Case of the Armenian Genocide, 316 pp.
- Khatchadourian, Raffi. "Letter from Turkey. A Century of Silence." The New Yorker, 5 January 2015, pp. 32–53.
- Laycock, Jo (2015). "Beyond National Narratives? Centenary Histories, the First World War and the Armenian Genocide Armenian Genocide" (PDF). Revolutionary Russia. 28 (2): 93–117. doi:10.1080/09546545.2015.1097091. S2CID 146746104.
- Der Matossian, Bedross (Winter 2015), "Explaining the Unexplainable: Recent Trends in the Armenian Genocide Historiography" (PDF), Journal of Levantine Studies, 5 (2): 143–166
- Melson, Robert (1982), "A Theoretical Inquiry into the Armenian Massacres of 1894–1896", Comparative Studies in Society and History, 24 (3): 481–509, doi:10.1017/S0010417500010100, S2CID 144670829.
- ——— (1989), "Revolutionary Genocide: On the causes of the Armenian genocide of 1915 and the Holocaust", Holocaust and Genocide Studies, 4 (2), Hein online: 161–174, doi:10.1093/hgs/4.2.161.
- Peroomian, Rubina (1993), Literary Responses to Catastrophe: A Comparison of the Armenian and the Jewish Experience.
- Quataert, Donald, "The Massacres of Ottoman Armenians and the Writing of Ottoman History," Journal of Interdisciplinary History 37:2 (2006): 249–259. online

=== Genocide denial ===
- The Banality of Denial, by Yair Auron, Rutgers University Press, New Brunswick, 2003, ISBN 0-7658-0834-X, 338 p.
- Investigation into the negation of a genocide, by Yves Ternon, Brackets, 1989
- Revolution and Genocide, by Robert Melson, 1992, 386 p.
- Armenia: The Survival of a Nation, by Christopher J. Walker. Revised Second Edition. New York, NY: St. Martin's Press, 1990. 476 p.
- Remembrance and Denial: The Case of the Armenian Genocide, by Richard G. Hovannisian, 1998
- Dadrian, Vahakn. Key Elements in the Turkish Denial of the Armenian Genocide. Toronto: Zoryan Institute, 1999.
- The Psychological Satisfaction of Denials of the Holocaust or Other Genocides by Non-Extremists or Bigots, and Even by Known Scholars, by Israel W. Charny, "IDEA" journal, 17 July 2001, Vol. 6, no. 1
- Professional ethics and the denial of the Armenian genocide, by Smith, Roger W.; Markusen, Eric; and Lifton, Robert Jay // Holocaust and Genocide Studies, # 9 (1), 1995, pp. 1–22
- "The long denied Armenian Genocide: Turkey's carefully forgotten history," by Taner Akçam, Le Monde Diplomatique, 2000
- U.S. Denial of the Armenian Genocide, by Stephen Zunes, "Foreign Policy in Focus", 22 October 2007
- Avedian, Vagahn (August 2012). "State Identity, Continuity, and Responsibility: The Ottoman Empire, the Republic of Turkey and the Armenian Genocide". European Journal of International Law. 23 (3): 797–820. doi:10.1093/ejil/chs056.
- "WAS THERE AN ARMENIAN GENOCIDE? GEOFFREY ROBERTSON QC'S OPINIONWITH REFERENCE TO FOREIGN & COMMONWEALTH OFFICE DOCUMENTS WHICH SHOW HOW BRITISH MINISTERS, PARLIAMENT AND PEOPLE HAVE BEEN MISLED" (PDF). 2009-10-09. Archived from the original (PDF) on 2015-05-01. – Posted at the University of Southern California (USC)
- Göçek, Fatma Müge (2015). Denial of Violence: Ottoman Past, Turkish Present and Collective Violence Against the Armenians, 1789–2009. Oxford University Press. ISBN 978-0-19-933420-9.

== Documentaries ==
- Carla Garapedian (director); Peter McAlevey (producer) (2006). Screamers (documentary film).
- "The Armenian Genocide I The Great War – Week 37". The Great War. 9 April 2015.
