= Germany and the Armenian genocide =

Participation and response in World War I

A photograph of Armenian refugees at Taurus Pass, by Imperial German Army medic Armin Wegner

During World War I, Germany was a military ally of the Ottoman Empire, which perpetrated the Armenian genocide. Many Germans present in eastern and southern Anatolia witnessed the genocide, but censorship and self-censorship hampered their reports, while German newspapers reported Ottoman denials of the genocide. Approximately 800 officers and 25,000 soldiers of the Imperial German Army were sent to the Middle Eastern theatre of World War I to fight alongside the Ottoman Army, with German commanders serving in the Ottoman high command and general staff. It is known that individual German military advisors signed some of the orders that led to Ottoman deportations of Armenians, a major component of the genocide, although some authors have highlighted a lack of concrete proof of any German participation in the genocide itself.

Although many individual Germans tried to publicize the Armenians' fate in defiance of wartime censorship, hoping to save as many lives as possible, the German Foreign Office and Ministry of War have both been harshly criticized for "extreme moral indifference" to the plight of Armenians and not doing more to stop the genocide. In 2016, the Bundestag apologized for Germany's "inglorious role" in a resolution recognizing the genocide.

== Information ==
Armin Wegner's description: "Looking at you is the dark [and] beautiful face of Babesheea who was robbed by Kurds, raped, and freed only after ten days; like a wild beast the Turkish soldiers, officers, soldiers, and gendarmes swept down on this welcome prey. All the crimes that had ever been committed against women, were committed here. They cut off their breasts, mutilated their limbs, and their corpses lay naked, defiled, or blackened by the heat on the fields."

The German Empire had been responsible for negotiating the Treaty of Berlin securing the status of Armenians in the Ottoman Empire. Germany under Chancellor Otto von Bismarck had been skeptical of German participation in the Middle East. This policy began to change under Kaiser Wilhelm II, who negotiated close relations with Ottoman Sultan Abdul Hamid II despite persecution of Armenians such as the Armenian massacres of 1894-1896. By the beginning of World War I an alliance had developed, and the Ottoman Empire under the Committee of Union and Progress entered the war on the side of Germany in the Central Powers.

Beginning in April 1915, many Germans present in eastern and southern parts of Anatolia became witnesses to the genocide. German witnesses recognized the genocidal character of the deportations. On 2 June 1915, consul Max Erwin von Scheubner-Richter reported that "An evacuation of such a size is tantamount to a massacre because due to a lack of any kind of transportation, barely half of these people will reach their destination alive." Twenty days later, missionary Johannes Lepsius told the Foreign Office that the systematic deportations were

obviously an attempt to decimate the Christian population in the empire as far as possible under the veil of martial law and by putting to use the Muslim elation aroused by the Holy War, abandoning it to extermination by carrying it off to climatically unfavourable and unsafe districts along the border.

By 17 July, the German consul in Samsun reported:

The countermeasures taken involve nothing less than the destruction or enforced Islamisation of a whole people. The destination of those exiled from Samsun is said to be Urfa. It is certain that no Christian Armenian will reach this destination. According to news from the interior, there are already reports on the disappearance of the deported population of entire towns.

According to historian Stefan Ihrig, "German archives hold a vast amount of such reports". Most of the German consuls in Anatolia prepared reports on the genocide and criticized it, but there was also an agreement with the Young Turk government "there was to be no written record of... conversations" on the Armenian issue. Some German diplomats tried to help the Armenians; Walter Rössler, the German consul in Aleppo, was reprimanded for excessive sympathy. Rössler also complained that the German press printed false stories denying atrocities against Armenians.

Those trying to get the word out were confounded by Ottoman censorship. For example, Germans were threatened with imprisonment for taking photographs of the Armenian deportees who died during the death marches. Information about the genocide was also censored in Germany, but penalties were lenient and self-censorship had more of an effect. German newspapers printed denials of the atrocities and regurgitated the Ottoman position of seeing Armenians as a subversive element and their persecution as justified. According to Ihrig, all the information was available to a German audience "yet it did not want to see". Historian Margaret L. Anderson states, "If we look not at the hard-pressed German-in-the-street but at the elites, the close-knit world of movers, shakers, and public opinion-makers, then the answer is clear: everyone. And if we ask, what did they know? The answer, with equal certitude, is: enough."

The socialist Karl Liebknecht and Catholic Matthias Erzberger were two of the very few members of the Reichstag to speak out against the Armenian genocide. On 11 January 1916, Liebknecht raised the issue of the Armenian genocide in the Reichstag, but received the reply that the Ottoman government "has been forced, due to the seditious machinations of our enemies, to transfer the Armenian population of certain areas, and to assign them new places of residence." When Liebknecht persisted and said he'd been informed that Armenians were being exterminated, he was interrupted with laughter from the rest of the room. Liebknecht described the genocide as "a sin now placed upon Germany." Other politicians of the left-wing elements of the SPD, such as Hugo Haase, Georg Ledebour, and Eduard Bernstein, also denounced the mass extermination. Ledebour questioned why many of his colleagues were willing to tolerate the genocide simply because the Ottomans were an ally.

"It is entirely inexplicable to me how socialists could bestow support in any form to such a government."

== Baghdad railway ==
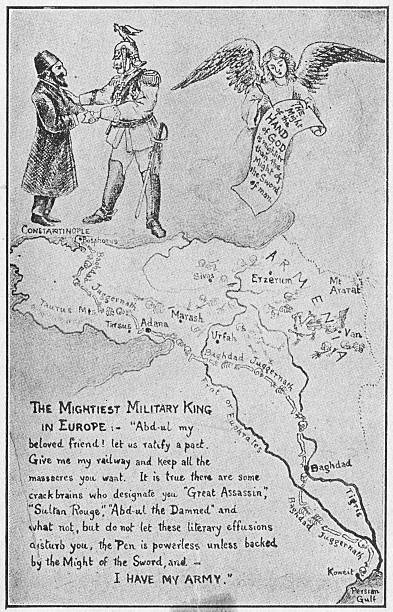
"An Armenian view of the Baghdad Railway", caricature depicting the railway as composed of human bones

The Baghdad railway was not located on the major routes of Armenian deportations or the main killing fields in the Syrian Desert. Nevertheless, it employed thousands of Armenians before 1915 and became drawn into the genocide. The first use of railways for genocide occurred in early 1915 when Armenian women and children from Zeitun were deported on trains to Konya and later marched into the Syrian Desert. Concentration camps were set up by railroad stations where tens of thousands of Armenians were held before deportation. According to the deputy director of the railway, Franz Günther, an average of 88 Armenians were packed into a single cattle car (usual capacity of 36 men) and newly born infants were taken from their mothers and thrown out of the train. The railway was paid for the deportation of Armenians, however, according to Günther's proposal, this money was spent buying food for them.

In October 1915, a German officer, Lieutenant Colonel Sylvester Boettrich, countersigned the deportation of Armenians working for the railway. Boettrich consistently hampered efforts by the railway to retain its employees and save Armenians, and the Imperial German Army supported him in his conflict with the railway. The Foreign Office then undertook an intensive but unsuccessful effort to destroy all copies of this order.

The railway hired as many Armenians as possible, including those unqualified for the jobs. In late 1915 and early 1916, the Ottoman government demanded the handing over of the Armenian workers as well as an estimated 40,000 to 50,000 widows and orphans who were in camps beside the railway. Although the railway company objected on the grounds that it would bring both construction and travel to a halt, some workers and their families, who until this time were staying in camps by the railway, were deported.

Some German employees tried to document the persecutions by taking photographs and collecting evidence, but an edict by Djemal Pasha required them to turn over all photographs and negatives. After this, photography was classified as espionage, but it continued nevertheless despite the risks. Franz J. Günther, vice-president of the railway, secretly sent information to Berlin, where it was made available to the Foreign Office. German medic Armin Wegner, who worked on the railway, stated:

we often, when we made camp for the night, passed by the camps, the death camps, in which the Armenians, helplessly expelled into the desert, were facing their eventual demise. The Turks avoided and denied these camps. The Germans did not go there and behaved as if they did not see them.

== Culpability ==
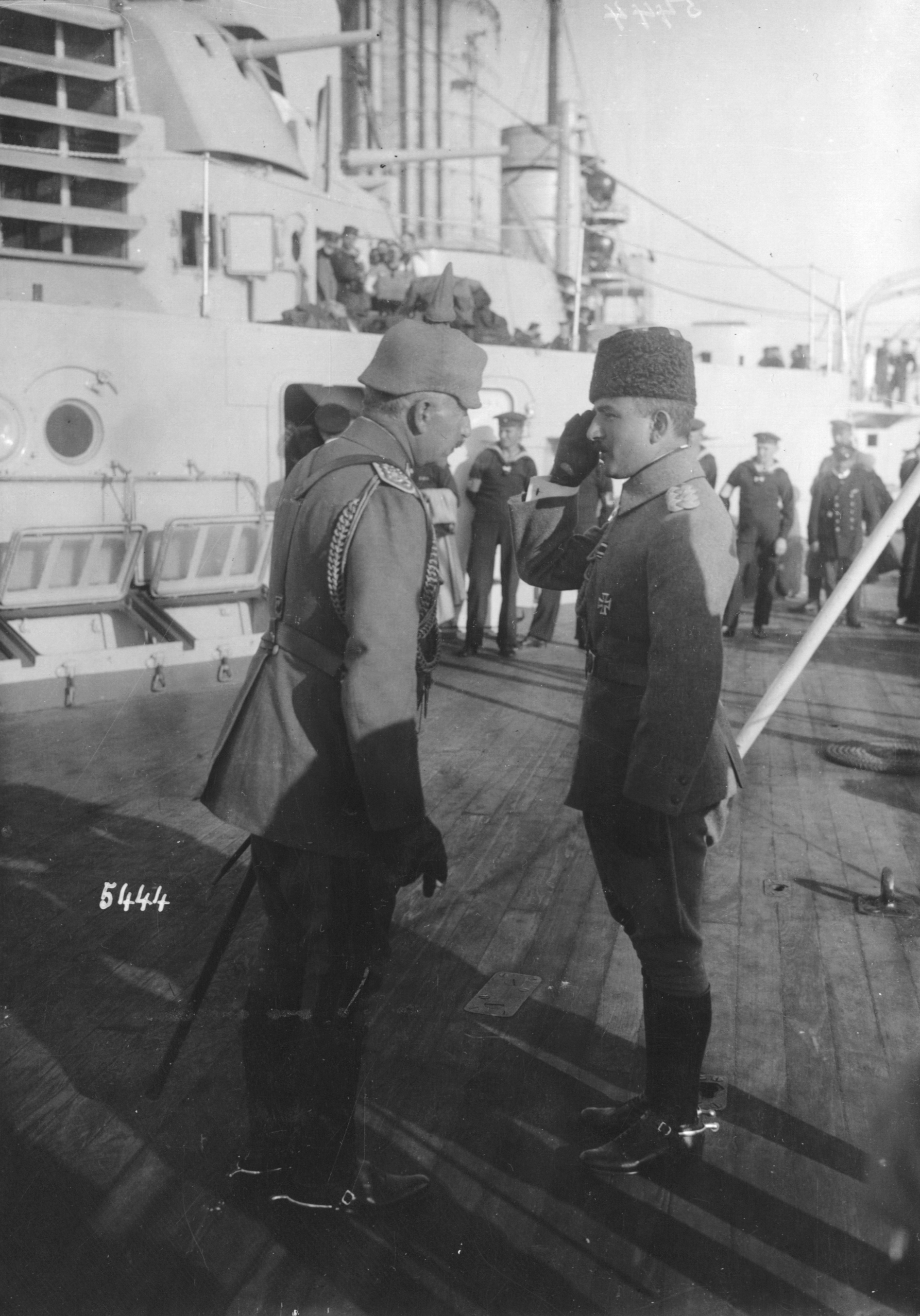
Kaiser Wilhelm II with Enver Pasha, October 1917. Enver was one of the main perpetrators of the genocide.

Toleration of extreme violence against civilians was entrenched in military culture of Imperial Germany. Other Germans, including naval attaché Hans Humann, openly approved of the genocide on nationalist grounds, rather than military necessity. After one group of Armenians was deported from Smyrna, German commander Otto Liman von Sanders blocked additional deportations by threatening to use military force to obstruct them. Ottoman forces often carried out massacres using German rifles and handguns, mainly supplied by Mauser.

"German officers who served in Turkish-Ottoman military staff actively helped carry out individual murders. The majority of the aggressors were armed with Mauser rifles or carbines, the officers with Mauser pistols."

German diplomats complained of an estimated 9.2 million marks in financial losses to German creditors as a result of the Armenian genocide, which could not be recouped as "abandoned" Armenian properties were confiscated by the Ottoman government. In 1916, Germany received 100 million marks of compensation from the Ottoman government; after the war, this sum was confiscated by the Allies. Although there were occasional German diplomatic protests against the genocide, Ihrig suggests that such protests "were mainly meant to save face and to control the political, reputational, and diplomatic damage the genocide might cause".

Ihrig suggests that the idea of German instigation may have been originally spread by the Young Turk government. Among German eyewitnesses, the most critical was the former interpreter Heinrich Vierbücher, who charged Germany with failing to break with the "Stambul assassins. [The German government] had joined the society of criminals, who had all the aces, and it had succumbed to their stronger will. Everything was subordinated to the pursuit of the phantom of victory". Armenian historian Vahakn Dadrian argued that German officials were "indirect accessories to crimes perpetuated by the [Turkish] Special Organization functionaries whose overall goal they endorsed, financed to some extent, and shepherded". According to historian Hilmar Kaiser, "German involvement in the Armenian Genocide covers a spectrum ranging from active resistance to complicity. A uniform German policy did not exist."

According to historian Ulrich Trumpener, the German government had little influence over the Ottoman government, such that "direct protection of the Armenians was completely beyond Germany's capacity". Trumpener further argues that Germany did not welcome or endorse the persecution of Armenians, although it should be faulted for "extreme moral indifference" to the Armenian plight and complete failure to take any measures to help them. Historian Margaret L. Anderson suggests that it would be unreasonable to expect Germany to end its alliance with the Ottoman Empire over the Armenian issue, as the Allies demanded, but that Germany could be faulted for lying to itself about the truth of Ottoman persecutions. According to historian Hans-Lukas Kieser, the best opportunity to intervene would be late 1914, when the Germans could have reiterated and emphasized their commitment to the Armenian reforms. Failing that, "the German authorities could have bargained much better in the summer of 1915 in order to exclude certain groups and regions from removal", although Kieser does not think it possible for Germany to have stopped the genocide. Genocide scholar Donald Bloxham argued that "The idea of a German role in the formation of the genocidal policy . . . has no basis in the available documentation." Ronald Grigor Suny argues that "[t]he best word to describe the German role is complicity (Mitschuld in German) rather than initiation, participation, or responsibility... German diplomats and officers did not intervene forcefully to stop the Armenian deportations and massacres. They had the military power but not the political will to stop the massacres."

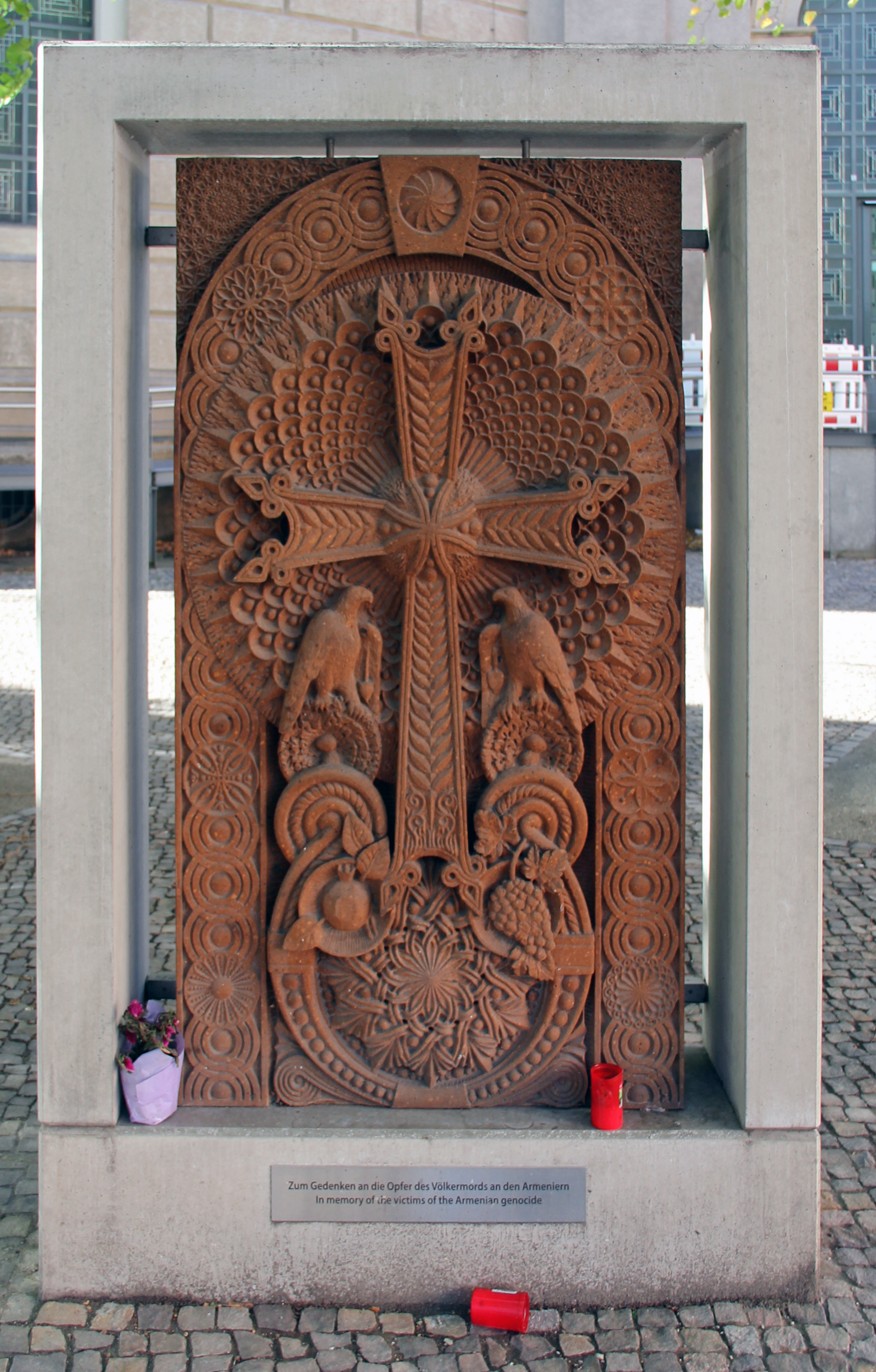
Memorial to the Armenian genocide behind St. Hedwig's Cathedral in Berlin

According to British human rights lawyer Geoffrey Robertson, if the Armenian genocide had been perpetrated a century later, the International Court of Justice would "hold Germany responsible for complicity with the genocide and persecution, since it had full knowledge of the massacres and deportations and decided not to use its power and influence over the Ottomans to stop them."

The Armenian genocide was one of many issues between the Ottoman–German alliance. The German government privately pressured the Ottoman government to terminate the deportation programs, but without success. This situation in mind, the German and American governments switched tactics, applying significant pressure to at least save Armenian Catholics and Protestants (the majority of the Armenian population belonged to the Armenian Apostolic Church). Over the summer of 1915, Talat Pasha repeatedly ordered for deportations of these groups to start and stop, but on the ground sectarian massacres continued mostly without interruption.

=== Sylvester Boettrich ===
Lieutenant Colonel Sylvester Boettrich, for example, signed at least one deportation order as head of the railroad department of the Ottoman General Headquarters that resulted in the dismissal and deportation of thousands of Armenians.

=== Eberhard Graf Wolffskeel von Reichenberg ===
Eberhard Graf Wolffskeel von Reichenberg was a German major and chief of staff of the deputy commander of the IV Ottoman Army, Fakhri Pasha. He was actively involved in the Armenian genocide, in which he destroyed a monastery in Zeitun (Süleymanlı) and the Armenian quarter of Urfa with German artillery in 1915. Von Reichenberg's shelling of Urfa led to the deportation and extermination of the city's Armenian population.

=== Otto von Feldmann ===
Otto von Feldmann was chief of operations department at the Ottoman General Headquarters from October 1915 and gave his advice to "clear certain areas [...] of Armenians at certain times." In a response to the grievances of the German consulate in Mosul in regards to the genocide, Feldmann described the genocide as "hard, but beneficial" and he saw a military obligation to support them. He was considered one of the main perpetrators of the Armenian genocide alongside Schellendorf and Souchon.

=== Wilhelm Souchon ===
Wilhelm Souchon was a German admiral in the Ottoman Empire and one of the main perpetrators of the Armenian Genocide. Admiral Souchon noted in his diary that “it would be a salvation for Turkey if it killed the last Armenian”.

=== Friedrich Bronsart von Schellendorff ===
Friedrich Bronsart von Schellendorff, the German commander in the Ottoman Empire and, according to Ihrig, the second-most-powerful man in the country after Enver Pasha, complained about "whining German consuls who understood nothing about the military necessity for the resettlement" of Armenians. Some historians hold Bronsart von Schellendorf responsible for being the main architect of the deadly concept of deportations and for instigating the Armenian Genocide. In his memoirs, Schellendorf justified the genocide by comparing Armenians to Jews, for allegedly leeching off the Ottoman empire at the time.

=== Colmar Freiherr von der Goltz ===
Colmar Freiherr von der Goltz was Commander in Chief of the Ottoman Army from October 1915 and was involved in the Armenian genocide alongside Boettrich and other German officers. Freiherr von der Goltz developed the first plans for the deportation of Armenians. As early as October 1897, Goltz had suggested on an event of the German-Turkish Association (DTV) that half a million Armenians living on the Russian border be resettled in Mesopotamia. When Enver Pasha presented him with the deportation order in March 1915 Goltz agreed to it.

== Aftermath ==
After the genocide, Germany attempted to portray its role in the best light. In 1919, Lepsius published Germany and Armenia, a collection of German diplomatic communications on the genocide. However, he expunged German anti-Armenianism and information that reflected badly on Germany, leading the book to be described as apologetic. Lepsius stated that he had full access to the German archives and that no document had been altered, which was not accurate. However, the book also exposed the reality of the genocide to a wide audience.

In 2015, President of Germany Joachim Gauck acknowledged Germany's "co-responsibility" for the genocide. In 2016, the Bundestag voted almost unanimously to recognize the genocide. The resolution also stated:

The Bundestag regrets the inglorious role of the German Empire, which, as a principal ally of the Ottoman Empire, did not try to stop these crimes against humanity, despite explicit information regarding the organized expulsion and extermination of Armenians, including also from German diplomats and missionaries.

In December 2023, an Armenian genocide monument in Cologne, Germany was removed due to pressure from Turkey and Turkish-German organizations, including the far-right nationalist Grey Wolves. A new monument is planned to replace it, which will be vaguely dedicated to "commemorating the victims of repression, racism, violence, and human rights violations".

== See also ==
- Armenian genocide and the Holocaust
- Turkey and the Holocaust
- War crimes in World War I

== Sources ==
- Akçam, Taner (2006). A Shameful Act: The Armenian Genocide and the Question of Turkish Responsibility. New York: Metropolitan Books. ISBN 978-0-8050-7932-6.
- Akçam, Taner (2018). Killing Orders: Talat Pasha's Telegrams and the Armenian Genocide. Springer. ISBN 978-3-319-69787-1.
- Anderson, Margaret Lavinia (2011). "Who Still Talked about the Extermination of the Armenians?". In Suny, Ronald Grigor; Göçek, Fatma Müge; Naimark, Norman M. (eds.). A Question of Genocide: Armenians and Turks at the End of the Ottoman Empire. Oxford University Press. ISBN 978-0-19-979276-4.
- Dadrian, Vahakn N. (2004). The history of the Armenian genocide: ethnic conflict from the Balkans to Anatolia to the Caucasus. Berghahn Books. ISBN 1-57181-666-6.
- Gust, Wolfgang (2014). The Armenian Genocide: Evidence from the German Foreign Office Archives, 1915-1916. Berghahn Books. ISBN 978-1-78238-143-3.
- Hofmann, Tessa (2015). "The Genocide against the Ottoman Armenians: German Diplomatic Correspondence and Eyewitness Testimonies". Genocide Studies International. 9 (1): 22–60. doi:10.3138/gsi.9.1.03. S2CID 152834321.
- Hosfeld, Rolf (2016). "Jürgen Gottschlich, Beihilfe zum Völkermord. Deutschlands Rolle bei der Vernichtung der Armenier, Berlin: Links 2015, 343 S., EUR 19,90 [ISBN 978-3-86153-817-2]" [Jürgen Gottschlich, Complicity in Genocide: Germany’s Role in the Extermination of the Armenians]. Militärgeschichtliche Zeitschrift (in German). 75 (1): 245–248. doi:10.1515/mgzs-2016-0041. ISSN 2193-2336.
- Ihrig, Stefan (2016). Justifying Genocide: Germany and the Armenians from Bismarck to Hitler. Harvard University Press. ISBN 978-0-674-50479-0.
- Kaiser, Hilmar (1998). "The Baghdad Railway and the Armenian Genocide, 1915-1916: A Case Study in German Resistance and Complicity". Remembrance and Denial: The Case of the Armenian Genocide. Wayne State University Press. ISBN 978-0-8143-2777-7.
- Kieser, Hans-Lukas (2010). "Germany and the Armenian Genocide of 1915–17". In Friedman, Jonathan C. (ed.). The Routledge History of the Holocaust. Taylor & Francis. doi:10.4324/9780203837443.ch3. ISBN 978-1-136-87060-6.
- Robertson, Geoffrey (2016). "Armenia and the G-word: The Law and the Politics". The Armenian Genocide Legacy. Palgrave Macmillan UK. pp. 69–83. ISBN 978-1-137-56163-3.
- Suny, Ronald Grigor (2015). "They Can Live in the Desert but Nowhere Else": A History of the Armenian Genocide. Princeton University Press. ISBN 978-1-4008-6558-1.
