= The Memoirs of Naim Bey =

1920 book by Aram Andonian

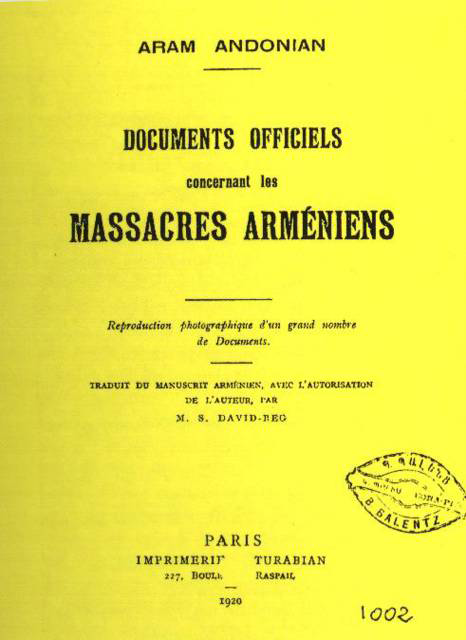
- First French edition cover
- Original title: The Memoirs of Naim Bey: Turkish Official Documents Relating to the Deportation and the Massacres of Armenians
- Language: English
- Subject: History
- Publisher: Hodder & Stoughton
- Publication date: 1920
- Publication place: England, United Kingdom
- Media type: Print (hardcover)
- Pages: 84

The Memoirs of Naim Bey: Turkish Official Documents Relating to the Deportation and the Massacres of Armenians, containing the Talat Pasha telegrams, is a book published by historian and journalist Aram Andonian in 1919. Originally redacted in Armenian, it was popularized worldwide through the English edition published by Hodder & Stoughton of London. It includes several documents (telegrams) that constitute evidence that the Armenian genocide was formally implemented as Ottoman Empire policy.

The first edition in English had an introduction by Viscount Gladstone.

== Contents ==
According to Andonian, the documents were collected by an Ottoman official called Naim Bey, who was working in the Refugees Office in Aleppo, and handed by him to Andonian. Each note bears the signature of Mehmed Talaat Pasha, the Minister of Interior and later Grand Vizier of the Ottoman Empire. The contents of these telegrams "clearly states his intention to exterminate all Armenians, outlines the extermination plan, offers a guarantee of immunity for officials, calls for tighter censorship and draws special attention to the children in Armenian orphanages." The telegrams remain in coded form and are written in Ottoman Turkish.

The overall picture emerging from these narrations points to a network of the extermination for most of the deportees. It overwhelmingly confirms the fact of what British historian Arnold J. Toynbee (LSE, University of London) called "this gigantic crime that devastated the Near East".

One day the following order came from the Minister of the Interior:

Although the extermination of the Armenians had been decided upon earlier than this, circumstances did not permit us to carry out this sacred intention. Now that all obstacles are removed, it is urgently recommended that you should not be moved for feelings of pity on seeing their miserable plight. But by putting an end to them all, try with all your might for obliterate the very name ’Armenia’ from Turkey.

A new and awful order arrived from the Ministry of the Interior. The Government commanded that the life and honour of the Armenians should be destroyed. They no longer had any right to live.

== Authenticity ==
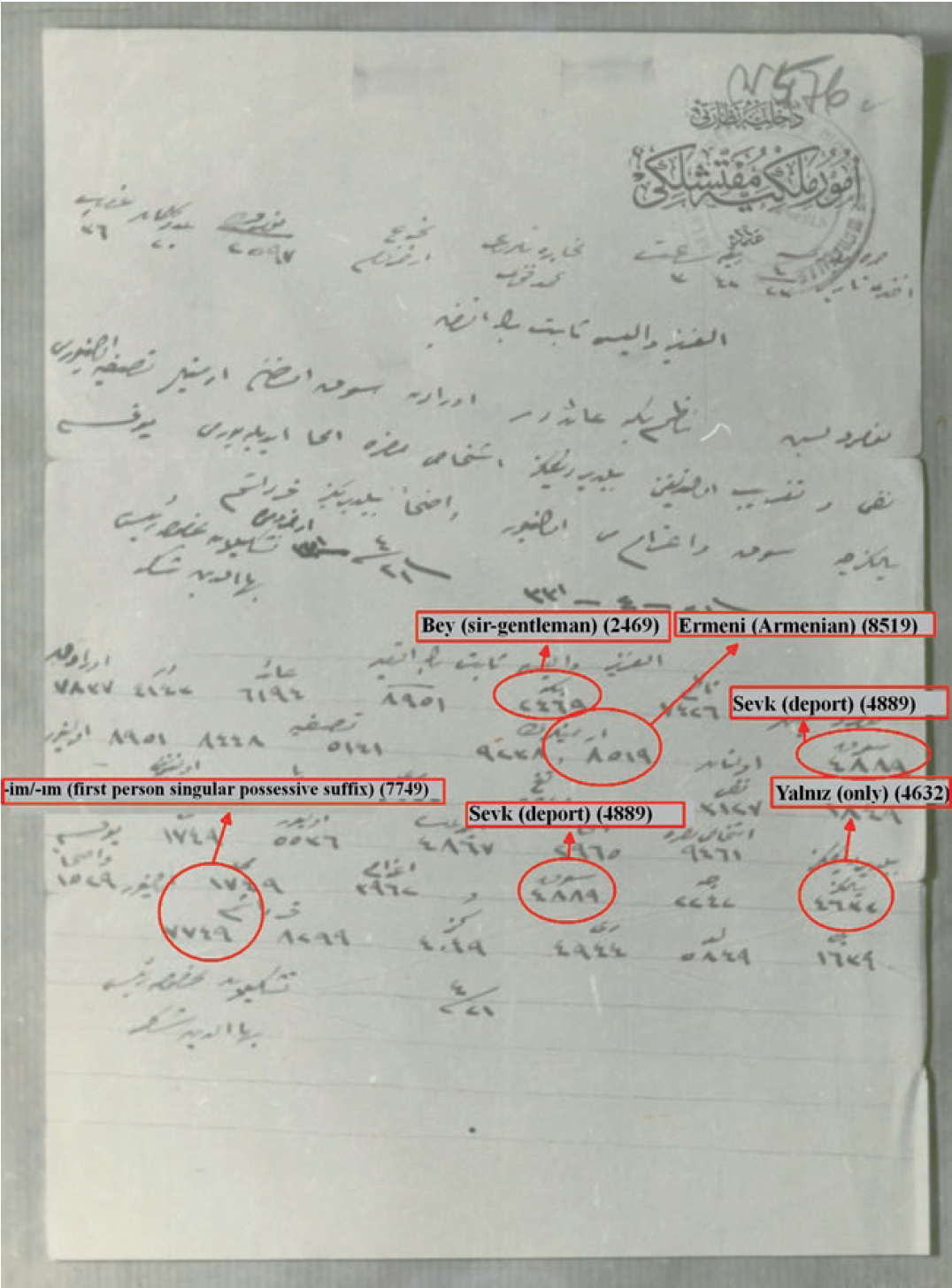
Bahaeddin Şakir telegram of 4 July 1915: "Have Armenians who were deported from there been eliminated? Have those harmful elements who were distanced [from there] through deportation been liquidated or simply deported?" The original was found by Taner Akçam in 2017.

In 1983, the Turkish Historical Association published their work titled "Ermenilerce Talat Pasa’ya Atfedilen Telgraflarin Gercek Yüzü" by Şinasi Orel and Süreyya Yuca. In the introduction to "The Talat Pasha Telegrams: Historical Fact or Armenian Fiction", its English-language edition published in 1985, Orel and Yuca wrote that the term "genocide" and the term "massacres" were being wrongly applied to characterize the Armenian genocide (which its authors describe as an Armenian "claim" and a "calumny directed against Turkey"), and that the documents contained within The Memoirs of Naim Bey were forgeries that had been, for more than 60 years, used as the basis for those charges of genocide and massacre.

The French historian Yves Ternon who convened at the 1984 Permanent Peoples' Tribunal contends that these telegrams however, "were authenticated by experts…[but] they were sent back to Andonian in London and lost."

Historian Vahakn N. Dadrian argued in 1986 that the points brought forth by Turkish historians are misleading and countered the discrepancies they raised.

Scottish historian Niall Ferguson, professor of history at Harvard University, senior research fellow of Jesus College, University of Oxford, and senior fellow of the Hoover Institution, Stanford University, and Richard Albrecht among others also point to the fact that the court did not question the authenticity of the telegrams in 1921–which, however, were not introduced as evidence in court–and that the British had also intercepted numerous telegrams which directly "incriminated exchanges between Talaat and other Turkish officials", and that "one of the leading scientific experts, Vahakn N. Dadrian, in 1986, verified the documents as authentic telegrams send out by [...] Talat Pasha". He adds:

"These flaws involve miscounting, misdating, misconversion of dates from old to new style, and careless editing, despite the availability of manifold resources, including staff assistance provided by the Turkish Historical Society—which in the chaos of the armistice were neither available nor affordable by either Naim or Andonian. Besides being incidental rather than central, such problems are endemic to the cumbersome nature of the material itself. The argument of falsification has been found to be untenable, since the few instances on which the argument is predicated merely involve irregularities. Irregularity is not coterminous, however, with forgery. Forgery presupposes skill, caution, and above all a measure of sophistication geared to avoiding mistakes. The presence and easy detection of such defects in the material under review mitigate against that charge. Indeed, no forger of any value would have produced material so incomplete and so flawed with glaring imperfections; these could have been easily avoided by anyone disposed to forge. Furthermore, a government apparatus known for its chronically erratic methods of transactions cannot be held exempt from such irregularities. Moreover, one is dealing here with highly secret transactions in the midst of a consuming “Great War,” initiated and directed by a political party that relied on diversions and camouflage for the pursuit of its secret designs; irregularity is an integral part of such a mentality."

Historians Hans-Lukas Kieser and Margaret Lavinia Anderson wrote in 2019 that Dadrian's rebuttal to the charges of forgery "remains convincing".

Turkish historian Taner Akçam mentions similarities between the telegrams published by Andonian to extant Ottoman documents. In a book published in 2016, named “The Naim Efendi Memoirs and Talat Pasha Telegrams”, he affirmed the authenticity of the memoir and the telegram.

=== Revisionism ===
Şinasi Orel and Süreyya Yuca claimed in their 1983 book The Talât Pasha "telegrams": historical fact or Armenian fiction? that Naim Bey did not exist, and his memoir and the telegrams were forgeries. According to Turkish historian Taner Akçam, their claims "were some of the most important cornerstones of denying the events of 1915" and "the book became one of the most important instruments for the anti-Armenian hate discourse". Akçam wrote a book, Killing Orders, to debunk the claims of Orel and Yuca and prove that the telegrams were authentic. In 2017, Akçam was able to access one of the original telegrams, archived in Jerusalem, which inquired about Armenian liquidation and elimination.

Guenter Lewy, a political scientist and genocide denier, also states that the telegrams form the "centerpiece" of "the case against the Turks", that the authenticity of the Naim-Andonian documents "will only be resolved through the discovery and publication of relevant Ottoman documents", and calls Orel and Yuca's work a "painstaking analysis of these documents" that makes "any use of them in a serious scholarly work unacceptable". About this position David B. MacDonald wrote that Lewy is content to rely on the work of "Turkish deniers Şinasi Orel and Sureyya Yuca": "Lewy's conception of shaky pillars echoes the work of Holocaust deniers, who also see Holocaust history resting on pillars... This is a dangerous proposition, because it assumes from the start that genocide scholarship rests on lies which can easily be disproved once a deeper examination of the historical 'truth' is undertaken".

Other opinions include Dutch professor Erik-Jan Zürcher (professor of Turkish studies at Leiden University); Zürcher does however point to many other corroborating documents supporting the Andonian Telegrams assertion of core involvement and premeditation of the killing by the central CUP members. Scholars who share revisionist opinions about the Andonian documents include Bernard Lewis (Professor Emeritus of Near Eastern Studies at Princeton University and Genocide denier), who classifies the "Talat Pasha telegrams" among the "celebrated historical fabrications", on the same level than The Protocols of the Elders of Zion, Andrew Mango (a biographer of Mustafa Kemal Atatürk) who speaks of "telegrams dubiously attributed to the Ottoman wartime Minister of the Interior, Talat Pasha", Paul Dumont (Professor of Turkish studies at Strasbourg University) who stated in one of his books that "the authenticity of the alleged telegrams of Ottoman government, ordering the destruction of Armenians is today seriously contested", Norman Stone (Bilkent University, Ankara, Turkey), who calls the Naim-Andonian book "a forgery"; and by Gilles Veinstein, professor of Ottoman and Turkish history at Collège de France, who considers the documents as "nothing but fakes".

== Editions ==
- The Memoirs of Naim Bey: Turkish Official Documents Relating to the Deportation and the Massacres of Armenians, compiled by Aram Andonian, Hodder and Stoughton, London, ca. 1920
- Documents sur les massacres arméniens, Paris, 1920 (incomplete translation by M. S. David-Beg)
- Մեծ Ոճիրը (The Great Crime), Armenian language edition, Hairenik, Boston, 1921

Note: Although the Armenian edition was published after the other two versions, historian Vahakn Dadrian states that the Armenian text constitutes the original that Aram Andonian wrote back in 1919. Taking into account the delay in its publication helps to explain some "errors" identified by some Turkish authors in dating the documents.

== See also ==
- Witnesses and testimonies of the Armenian genocide
- Johannes Lepsius

== Bibliography ==
- Dadrian, Vahakn N. (August 1986). "The Naim-Andonian Documents on the World War I Destruction of Ottoman Armenians: The Anatomy of a Genocide". International Journal of Middle East Studies. 18 (3). Cambridge University Press: 311–360. doi:10.1017/S0020743800030506. S2CID 154901860.
- Ferguson, Niall (2006). The War of the World: Twentieth-Century Conflict and the Descent of the West. New York: Penguin Press. p. 179. ISBN 1-59420-100-5.
- Lewy, Guenter (2005). The Armenian Massacres in Ottoman Turkey. Salt Lake City: University of Utah Press.
- Ternon, Yves (1989). Enquête sur la négation d'un génocide [analysis by Yves Ternon stating the telegrams are probably authentic]. Marseille: éditions parenthèses. ISBN 2-86364-052-6.
- Mouradian, Claire (January 2015). "Le télégramme, outil de génocide : le cas arménien". Revue d'histoire de la Shoah (in French). 202 (202): 507–535.
- Akçam, Taner (2018). Killing Orders: Talat Pasha's Telegrams and the Armenian Genocide. Springer. ISBN 978-3-319-69787-1.
