= İttihadism =

Ideology of the Committee of Union and Progress

Ittihadism (Turkish: İttihatçılık, lit. 'Unionism or Unificationism') was the ideology of the Committee of Union and Progress, which undertook the Young Turk Revolution in 1908 and ruled the Ottoman Empire from 1913 to 1918.

Ideologically, the CUP was far ahead of German elites in conspiracy theory, volkisch (exaltedly ethnic) nationalism, and demographic engineering. It pioneered a modern, right-wing revolution that blended ethnoreligious conflict with class struggle and a modernizing, anti-liberal, and anti-Western political agenda.

— Hans-Lukas Kieser, Talaat Pasha: Father of Modern Turkey, Architect of Genocide

== Turkish nationalism ==
The Central Committee of the Committee of Union and Progress was made up of intense Turkish nationalists, but until the defeat in the First Balkan War in 1912–13, the CUP did not publicly stress its Turkish nationalism to avoid offending the non-Turkish population of the empire. A further problem for the CUP was that the majority of the Ottoman Empire's ethnic Turks did not see themselves at all as Turks but rather simply as Sunni Muslims who happened to speak Turkish. The Turkish historian Taner Akçam wrote that at the time of the First World War. "It is even questionable whether the broad mass of Muslims in Anatolia at the time understood themselves as Turks, or Kurds, rather than as Muslims". Though the CUP was dedicated to a revolutionary transformation of Ottoman society by its "science-conscious cadres", the CUP were conservative revolutionaries who wished to retain the monarchy and Islam's status as the state religion as the Young Turks believed that the sultanate and Islam were essential parts of the glue holding the empire together.

== Cult of science ==
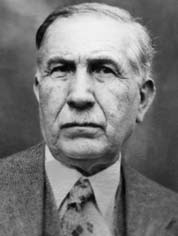
Yusuf Ziya Özer, a law professor and one of the conceives of the Turkish History Thesis.

The CUP believed that the secret behind Western success was science, and the more scientifically advanced nations were the more powerful ones. According to the Turkish historian Handan Nezir Akmeşe, the essence of the CUP was the "cult of science" and a strong sense of Turkish nationalism. Strongly influenced by French intellectuals such as Auguste Comte and Gustave Le Bon, the CUP had embraced the idea of rule by a scientific elite. For the Young Turks, the empire's basic problems were its backward, impoverished status and the illiteracy of most of its Muslim population, which meant that most Ottoman Muslims could not learn about modern science even if they had wanted to. The CUP had an obsession with science, especially the natural sciences (CUP journals devoted much text to chemistry lessons), and its members often described themselves as "societal doctors" who would apply modern scientific ideas and methods to solve all social problems. The CUP saw itself as a scientific elite, whose superior knowledge would save the empire; one member later recalled the atmosphere, "Being a Unionist was almost a type of God-given privilege".

== Social Darwinism ==
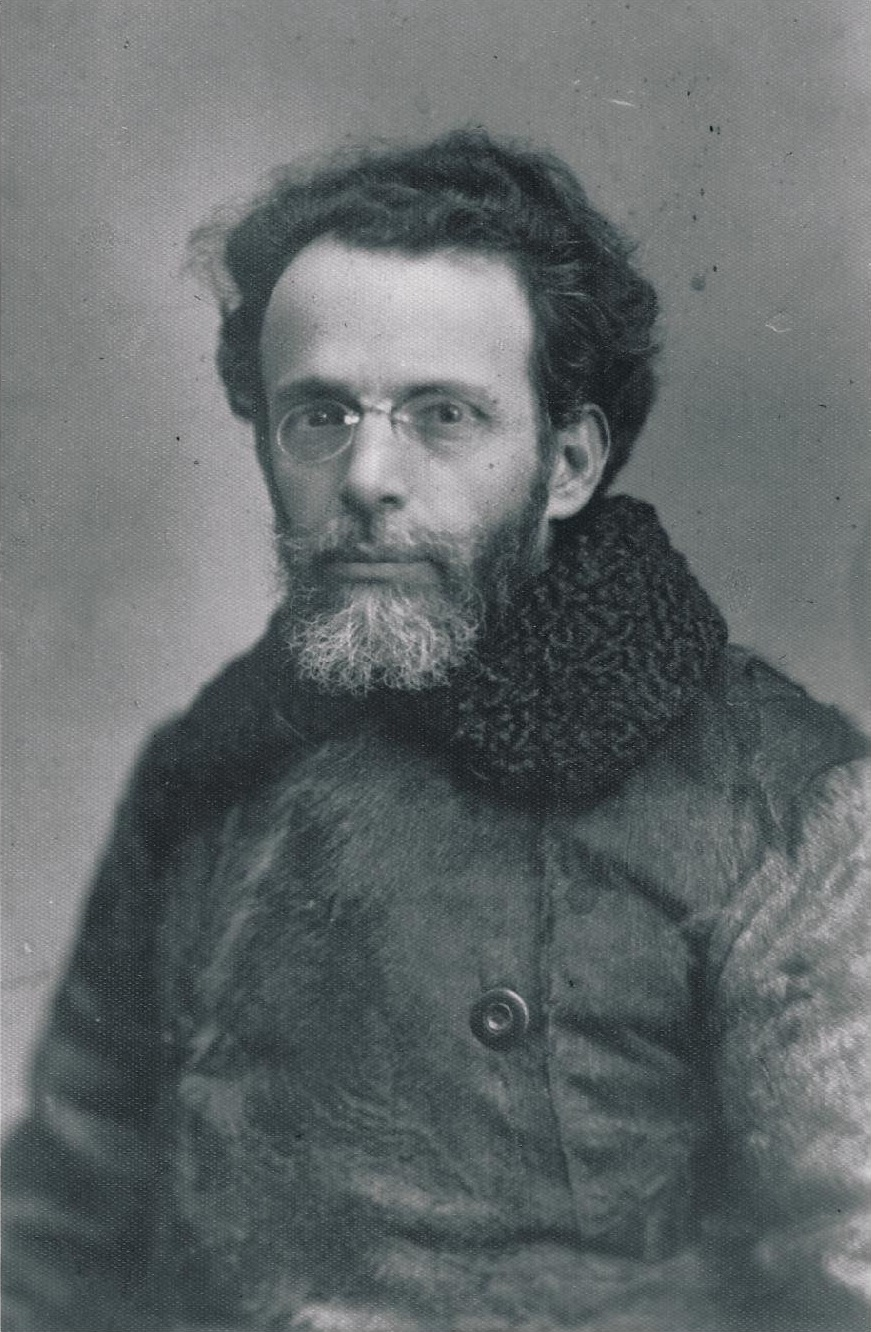
Ahmet Cevat Emre, writer who was influenced by social Darwinism, which he wrote about in the monthly family magazine Muhit during the early republican period.

Alongside the unbounded faith in science, the CUP embraced Social Darwinism and the völkisch, scientific racism that was so popular at German universities in the first half of the 20th century. In the words of the sociologist Ziya Gökalp, the CUP's chief thinker, the German racial approach to defining a nation was the "one that happened to more closely match the condition of 'Turkishness', which was struggling to constitute its own historical and national identity". The French racist Arthur de Gobineau, whose theories had such a profound impact upon 19th-century German völkisch thinkers, was also a major influence upon the CUP. Akçam wrote that the CUP was quite flexible about mixing pan-Islamic, pan-Turkic, and Ottomanist ideas as they suited its purposes, and the CUP at various times would emphasise one at the expense of the others, depending upon the exigencies of the situation. To the CUP, ideologies were secondary to the end goal of a powerful predominantly-Turkish Ottoman Empire.

The Young Turks had embraced Social Darwinism and pseudo-scientific biological racism as the basis of its philosophy, with history being seen as a merciless racial struggle with only the strongest "races" surviving. For the CUP, the Empire of Japan had ensured that the "Japanese race" were strongest in East Asia, and it was the duty of the CUP to ensure that the "Turkish race" became the strongest in the Near East. For the CUP, just as it was right and natural for the superior "Japanese race" to dominate "inferior races" like the Koreans and the Chinese, likewise it would be natural for the superior "Turkish race" to dominate "inferior races" like the Greeks and the Armenians. Th Social Darwinist perspective explains how the CUP so ferociously criticised of Western imperialism, especially if it was directed against the Ottomans, and so much supported Japanese imperialism in Korea and China. When Japan annexed Korea in 1910, the Young Turks supported the move under the Social Darwinist grounds that the Koreans were a weak people, who deserved to be taken over by the stronger Japanese for their own good and that of the Japanese Empire. Along the same lines, the Social Darwinism of the CUP led it to see the Armenian and Greek minorities, who tended to be much better educated, literate and wealthier than the Turks and dominated the business life of the empire, as threats to its plans for a glorious future for the "Turkish race".

The CUP's ideas of Turkish superiority were contrary to Islamic doctrine, which teaches that all humans are equal on the grounds of ethnicity and race. For the purpose of gaining public support from a Turkish public, which was, for the most part, devoutly Muslim and to avoid alienating those Ottoman Muslims who were not Turks, like the Arabs, the Albanians and the Kurds, the CUP's pseudo-scientific theories about the "Turkish race" were usually not publicly proclaimed.

== Pan-Islamism ==
During the reign of Sultan Abdul Hamid II, Pan-Islamism had become an important part of the state ideology, as Abdul Hamid had often stressed his claim to be the caliph. That claim would make him the political and spiritual leader of all Sunni Muslims which spread within the Ottoman Empire but also the rest of Dar-al-Islam (the "House of Islam", i.e. the Islamic world), especially in British India. The fact that Indian Muslims seemed to have far more enthusiasm for the Ottoman Sultan-Caliph than for the British King-Emperor was a matter of considerable concern for British decision-makers. The fear that the Sultan-Caliph might declare jihad against the British and thereby plunge India into a revolt by its Muslims were constant factors in British policy towards the Ottoman Empire.

The CUP endorsed Abdul Hamid's legacy upon his death in February 1918 even though it had launched a revolution against him in 1908 and ultimately deposed him in 1909. Şükrü Hanioğlu asserts that the CUP generally appealed to Islam simply whenever it was convenient. For the CUP, keeping the Sultanate-Caliphate not only reinforced the loyalty of Ottoman Muslims to the empire but also was a useful foreign policy tool. As in 1909, Crete decided to leave the Ottoman Empire and join Greece instead, the CUP warned the European powers to support such an endeavour, as it would lead to a strong opposition from the Muslim communities worldwide. Similarly, the CUP sent a delegation to the annual Hajj pilgrimage to Mecca in 1909 to raise support for its opposition to the European aggression. To forge further support to an eventual Pan-Islamic alliance, the CUP supported the creation of the Islamic association Ittihad-ol-Islam in Iran in 1910 and managed to establish Pan-Islamist ties in Iraq despite the Shia-Sunni divide.

== Modernisation and secularism ==
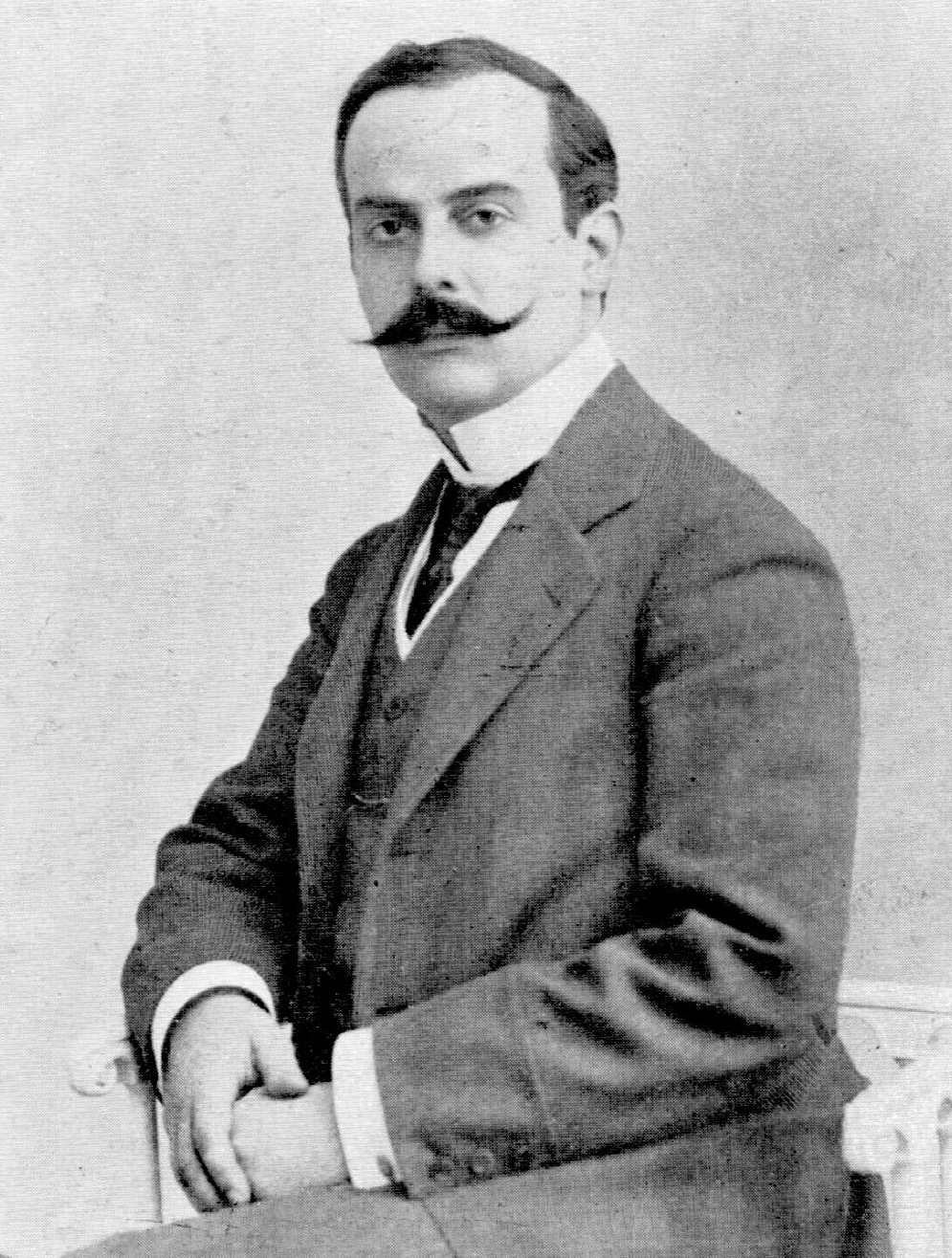
Hüseyin Cahit Yalçın was a prominent member of the CUP whose racial theories became popular within the party

While the CUP eventually relied on Pan-Islamism, there was always a secular culture within the Sacred Committee. The CUP heavily cracked down on religious fanaticism following the 31 March incident, which strained its relationship with the ulema, but at the same time, it used Islamist fervour for its benefit during the First World War. Nevertheless, the CUP saw itself as a modernizing force for bringing Ottoman, Turkish and Muslim society to European standards, which mandated social reform. An example of pre-Kemalist social reform was the controversial "Temporal Family Law", passed in 1917, which was a significant advance in women's rights and secularism in Ottoman matrimonial law. Women's right to divorce was expanded, and polygamy was restricted.

== Influence of Goltz ==
The primary influences on the CUP were the French scientist Gustave Le Bon and the German General Baron Colmar von der Goltz. Le Bon argued that democracy was only just mindless mob rule and that the best form of the government was a rule by a scientific elite.

Equally important because of the large number of army officers in the CUP was the influence of Goltz, who trained an entire generation of Ottoman officers, the so-called "Goltz generation". Goltz was a militarist, Social Darwinist and ultranationalist, who saw war as something necessary, desirable and inevitable. He wrote, "It [war] is an expression of the energy and self-respect which a nation possesses.... Perpetual peace means perpetual death!" Goltz's most important idea, which would greatly influence the Unionists, was that in modern war, the side that could mobilise best the entire resources of its society would now be the one that would win and sp the best thing that could done was to militarise one's society in peacetime to ensure that it would be a "nation in arms" when the inevitable war came. Goltz, who spoke fluent Turkish and was very popular with the officers whom he trained, expressed a great deal of admiration for the Turks as a naturally-warlike people. That was in contrast to his country, where he believed that hedonism had made the next generation of young German men unfit for war.

Goltz was also an intense Anglophobe, who believed that the great struggle of the coming 20th century would be a world war between Britain and Germany for the mastery of the world. He consered it to be self-evident that the world was just too small for the British and German Empires to co-exist, and he urged his protégés in the Ottoman Army to ensure that the empire fought on the side of Germany when the inevitable Anglo-German war would break out.

== Japanophilia ==
As great as the influences of Goltz and Le Bon were on the Unionists, the primary example for them was Japan. Germany was the role model for the technical and organisational aspects of modernisation, and Japan was the overall societal model. Already within the early 20th century, the Japanese had started to champion the ideology of Pan-Asianism, under which all of the Asian peoples were to united under the leadership of Japan, the strongest of the Asian nations and as the "great Yamato race", the most racially superior of the Asian peoples as a justification for Japanese imperialism. The CUP was greatly influenced by Japanese Pan-Asianism, which served as a template for its ideology of Pan-Islamism in which all of the world's Muslims would united in the Ottoman Empire, which would certainly be led by the "Turkish race". An American historian, Sven Saaler, noted the "important connections" between the Japanese pan-Asian and the Ottoman pan-Islamist movements in the early 20th century and the "astonishing parallels" between the two movements. The ultimate aim of the CUP was to modernise the Ottoman Empire to recapture its former greatness, and just as the modernised Japan had defeated Russia in 1905, the modernised Ottomans would defeat the Western nations.

The CUP, which always greatly admired Japan for modernising itself after the so-called Meiji Restoration of 1867–68, was much impressed by Meiji Japan's victory over the Russian Empire in the Russo-Japanese War. The Young Turks were especially impressed with the way the Japanese had embraced western science and technology without losing their "Eastern spiritual essence", an example that was especially inspiring to them because many in the Ottoman Empire believed the embrace of western science and technology to be diametrically opposed to Islam. The fact that an Asian nation like Japan had defeated Russia in 1905, the traditional enemy of the Ottoman Empire, was very inspiring to the CUP, and its newspapers all portrayed Japan's victory as a triumph over not only Russia but also western values. To the CUP, for which science was something of a religion, the Japanese example seemed to show how the Ottoman Empire could embrace the science of the west without losing its Islamic identity.

Reflecting the intense Japanophilia, the new regime proclaimed its intention to remake the Ottoman Empire into the "Japan of the Near East". In its own mind, the Central Committee of the CUP saw itself as playing a role analogous to that of the oligarchy of Meiji Japan, and the 1908 Young Turk Revolution as an event comparable to the brief civil war that had toppled the Tokugawa shogunate in 1867–68. Colonel Pertev Bey wrote after the revolution of 1908: "We will rise shortly... with the same brilliance as the Rising Sun of the Far East did a few years ago! In any case, let us not forget that a nation always rises from its own strength!"

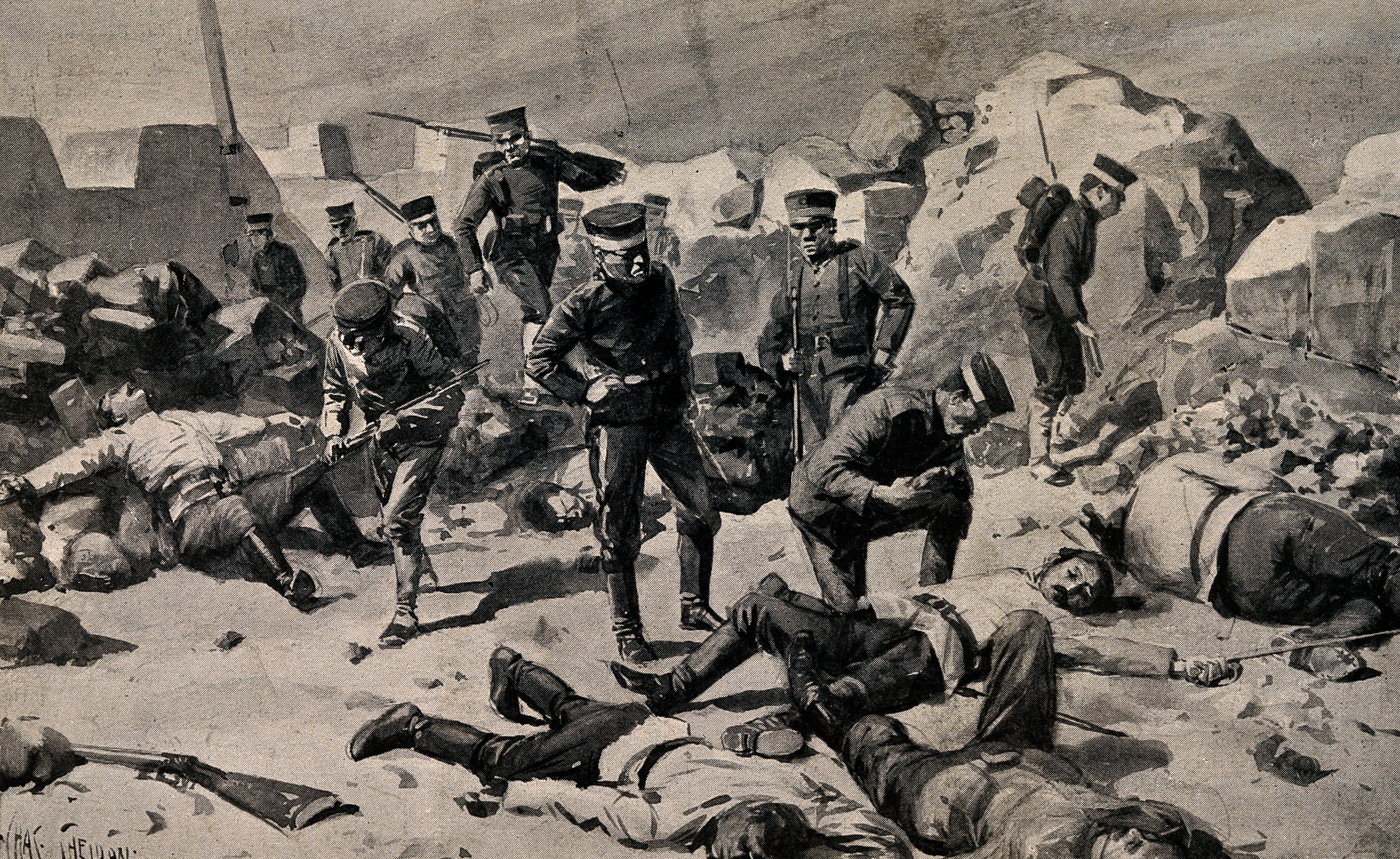
Japanese soldiers entering a bombed fort in the Russo-Japanese War

In an inversion of western paranoia about the "Yellow Peril", the CUP often fantasised about creating an alliance with Japan to unite all the peoples of "the East" to wage war against and wipe out the much-hated western nations, which dominated the world, and a "Yellow Wave" to wash away European civilisation for good. For them, the term yellow, which was in fact a derogatory Western term for East Asians that based upon their perceived skin colour, stood for the "Eastern Gold", the innate moral superiority of people in the East over the corrupt West. In the eyes of the CUP, the Middle East, the Indian subcontinent and the Far East had superior civilisations to that of the West, and it was merely an unfortunate accident of history for the West to become more economically and technologically advanced than the Asian civilisations, which they were determined to correct.

An additional attraction for Japan as a role model for the CUP was that the Japanese had modernised while keeping their women in an extremely subservient position within their society. The all-male Young Turks did not want Ottoman women to become anything like those of the West but instead wanted to preserve the traditional roles for women.

== Nation in arms ==
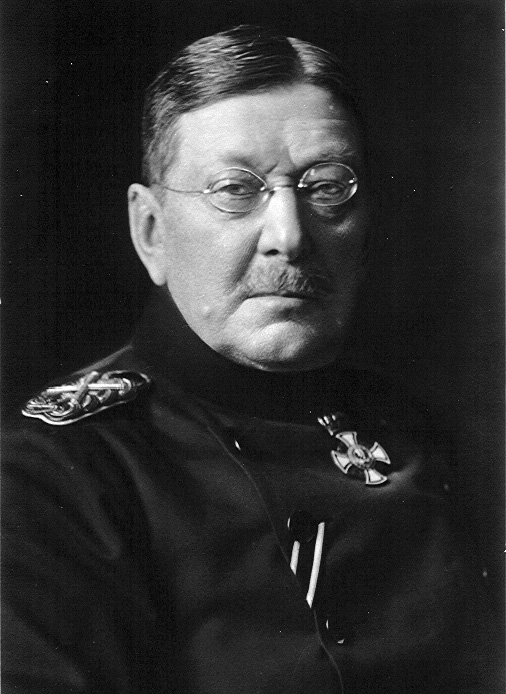
Goltz Pasha, who trained the "Goltz generation" a cadre of Ottoman officers indoctrinated with his ethno-nationalist ideas

Influenced by Goltz's "nation in arms" theory, the CUP held that in war the moral state of the nation was just as important as such aspects as its technology and the level of training.

The Japanese held fast to their traditional values of bushido ("the way of the warrior") and had an educational system that was designed to indoctrinate every Japanese young man with the belief that there was no higher duty than to die for the emperor and every Japanese young woman had no higher duty than to bear sons who would die for the emperor. The CUP was much impressed with how the Japanese had fought at the Siege of Port Arthur (now Lüshun, China), where the Japanese infantry advanced on the Russian trenches, only to be mown down time after time by the Russian machine guns and suffer thousands of dead in each assault. However, the Japanese soldiers, full of their belief in bushido, were honoured to die for their Emperor. As such, the Japanese kept on assaulting the Russian lines at Port Arthur despite their enormous losses.

The Japanese soldiers had been indoctrinated since their earliest days by Japanese ultranationalism and bushido and so fought fanatically for their nation. The CUP was keen to emulate that example. By contrast, the CUP noted how the Russian soldiers had no idea why they were fighting in Manchuria or why their country was at war with Japan. With nothing to believe in, the Russians clung only to their lives and fought poorly since they had no wish to die for a cause that was unfathomable to them. Many CUP officers took the "lesson" of Port Arthur that an army that was fanatically motivated could always win, and the power of a properly-dug defence, even one manned by such poorly-motivated soldiers such as the Russians at Port Arthur to inflict terrible casualties on an attacking force, made less of an impression on them.

A major factor in CUP thinking was the "devaluation of life", the belief that Eastern peoples like the Japanese and the Turks attached no value to human life, including their own, and so supposedly died willingly and happily for the cause. That was supposed to be unlike Western people, who allegedly clung pathetically to their lives when confronted with danger. The CUP intended to emulate the Japanese example by creating a militaristic educational system designed to make every man a soldier and every woman into essentially a soldier-making machine; the concept of jihad would play the same role in motivating the Turkish soldier to fight and die for the caliph (regarded as Allah's representative on the Earth) as bushido did for the Japanese soldier to die for his emperor (regarded by the Japanese as a living god).

Ultimately for the CUP, war was a test of wills, and the side that had the stronger will would always prevail. The CUP rconsidered the Turks as an eastern people that supposedly cared nothing for the value of human life and so would have an innate advantage over the decadent West. The CUP thought that an eastern army with the same level of training and technology as a western army had the advantage because of its greater will to win. It believed that the combination of German training and weapons and the greater willingness to die, which was motivated by its own superior Islamic and Turkish traditions, would make the Ottoman military invincible in war. Past Ottoman victories over western nations, like those over the Serbs at Kosovo in 1389, which ended Serbia as an independent kingdom; over the French, Hungarian, German and other Christian knights at Nicopolis in 1396, which crushed the crusade proclaimed by Pope Boniface IX; the Fall of Constantinople in 1453, which ended the eastern Roman Empire; and the Battle of Mohacs in 1526, which led to conquest of Hungary, were used by the CUP to argue that the Turks were naturally the greatest soldiers in the world, much superior to western soldiers. The Turks had, according to the CUP, become lazy since those glorious days and needed now a series of reforms to allow Turkish society to become the "nation in arms".

== National economy ==
Before the revolution, the CUP held extremist views of the economy such as by advocating for boycotts against Armenian goods and shutting down the Public Debt Administration. Post-revolutionary success gave way to a pragmatic economic policy. Other than encouragement of domestic production projects, the CUP largely followed a free-trade policy to Cavid's designs, which resulted in a large increase in foreign investment between 1908 and 1913 despite the volatility of the Ottoman Empire's international standing.

However, the radicalization of the CUP after the Balkan Wars made it return to extremist rhetoric in the economy by advocating for Muslim Turkish domination of the economy at the expense of non-Muslim and non-domestic business. National Economy, "Millî İktisat", was a combination of corporatism, protectionism and statist economic policies and became a formal platform of CUP policy in its 1916 Congress in Selanik, whose goal was to create an indigenous Turkish Muslim bourgeoisie and middle class. For the CUP, the way to kick start capitalism for the Turks was to seize capital from the well-endowed Christians for themselves. To that end, pseudo-Marxist rhetoric was used against Armenian enterprise such as there being a "class struggle" and the disproportionate ownership by Armenians of wealth, which had to be shared with Muslims at all costs. Import substitution industrialization and property confiscation that was centralized of economic capital in the hands of "loyal" ethnic groups, deepened political support for the CUP. As for foreign trade, the well-established free trade policy gave way to protectionism: tariffs were increased in 1914 from 8 to 11% and by 1915 had reached 30%.

The policies associated with National Economy were essential for the CUP's Türk Yurdu project, which carried over to the later Republican People's Party regime and created a fertile ground for Turkey's industrialisation after the Turkish War of Independence.

== Democracy ==
In the words of the Turkish historian Handan Nezir Akmeşe, the CUP commitment to the 1876 Constitution for which it professed to be fighting was only "skin deep" and more of a rallying cry for popular support than anything else.

== Anti-communism ==
Realising that the Young Turks had not fulfilled their promises from before 1908, workers from different nationalities organized strikes from Thrace to all over the Aegean Region. Meanwhile, groups such as the Socialist Workers' Federation and the Ottoman Socialist Party emerged. The anti-communist Young Turks, who were afraid of the workers' international solidarity and revolutionism, enacted the Tatil-i Eşgaal Kanunu (Law on the Suspension of Work). Later, during the late Ottoman genocides, they exiled communist intellectuals, along with minorities.

== Sources ==
- Akçam, Taner (2007). A Shameful Act. London: Macmillan.
- Akmeşe, Handan Nezir (2005). The Birth of Modern Turkey: The Ottoman Military and the March to World War I. London: IB Tauris.
- Kieser, Hans-Lukas (2018). Talaat Pasha: Father of Modern Turkey, Architect of Genocide. Princeton University Press. ISBN 978-0-691-15762-7.
- Hanioğlu, M. Şükrü (2008), A Brief History of the Late Ottoman Empire, Princeton
- Worringer, Renée (May 2004). "'Sick Man of Europe' or 'Japan of the near East'?: Constructing Ottoman Modernity in the Hamidian and Young Turk Eras". International Journal of Middle East Studies. 36 (2): 207–230. doi:10.1017/S0020743804362033. S2CID 156657393.
- ——— (2014). Ottomans Imagining Japan: East, Middle East, and Non-Western Modernity at the Turn of the Twentieth Century. London: Palgrave.
- Topal, Alp Eren (2017). "Against Influence: Ziya Gökalp in Context and Tradition". Journal of Islamic Studies etw059. doi:10.1093/jis/etw059.
