= Open Wounds =

2015 book by Vicken Cheterian

- First edition cover
- Author: Vicken Cheterian
- Publisher: Oxford University Press, Hurst Publishers
- Publication date: 2015

Open Wounds: Armenians, Turks and a Century of Genocide is a 2015 book by Vicken Cheterian and published by Hurst that aims to be a "political history of the genocide since [1915] and the consequences of denialism". The book was praised for its comprehensiveness and accessibility to a wide audience.

== Background ==
Vicken Cheterian is a journalist known for his reporting on Russia and the Caucasus region. He comes from a typical Armenian diaspora background, having been born and raised in Lebanon, and now lives in Switzerland. Cheterian states that he used to find the genocide an "unbearably painful" topic, but increasing openness in Turkish society "alleviated the pain to a degree that made the work bearable".

== Content ==
The Armenian Genocide during the First World War was a unique historical experience: what happens after a crime, when the criminal remains free and everyone pretends that a crime has never taken place? What happens when an entire nation is uprooted from its land, massacred and the survivors are dispersed around the globe, and the world simply turns a blind eye?

In Cheterian's view, denial of the genocide has had devastating consequences both for Turkey, Armenians, and the world in general. Cheterian argues that "by censoring the Armenian Genocide, its impact, traces and consequences do not simply disappear. It continues in various forms", citing the repression of Kurds and Christians in Turkey, deep state in Turkey, lack of human rights in Turkey, and Nagorno-Karabakh conflict.

The book opens with the 2007 assassination of Hrant Dink, a Turkish-Armenian journalist who worked to raise awareness about the genocide as well as contemporary discrimination against Armenians in Turkey. In the book, Cheterian profiles many influential Turkish intellectuals, such as Taner Akçam, the first Turkish historian to acknowledge and study the genocide, and Turkish sociologist Fatma Müge Göçek. Cheterian also interviews Ragıp Zarakolu, a Turkish publisher who went to jail for publishing books about the genocide; Turkish lawyer Fethiye Çetin who discovered that her grandmother was actually a hidden Armenian who survived the genocide; and Hasan Cemal, the grandson of Cemal Pasha. Cheterian believes that Turkey's democratization is tied to its honesty about its past, and that this will happen eventually but not in the short term future.

== Reception ==
Göçek states that she "was personally amazed by the clarity with which" Cheterian "identif[ies] turning points on the road to acknowledgement" and called the book "an excellent complete history of the contemporary period regarding the negotiation of the acknowledgement of the Armenian Genocide in Turkey". Yaşar Tolga Cora states that the book succeeds in its aim at being accessible to a broad audience, but does not investigate the ordinary Turks, such as those who marched at Dink's funeral. Guy Lancaster describes it as a "fundamentally captivating book" and "compelling work of scholarship".

Historian Tessa Hofmann praises the book as a "instructive and very readable monograph" but makes three criticisms: Cheterian gives an exaggerated impression of the influence of the writings of historian Vahakn Dadrian, his arguments about the continuity of the deep state lack adequate evidence, and he does not explore the role of the education system in shaping Turkish attitudes. Sossie Kasbarian and Kerem Öktem call the book "a highly readable and engaging work combining historical and political analysis with investigative journalism" that is "accessible to a wide, non-specialist audience".

In Foreign Affairs, political scientist Robert Legvold states that the "book offers one of the most complete tellings" of the Armenian genocide and its legacy today. Seyhan Bayraktar states that "Open Wounds is a highly informative and comprehensive book for readers who want to learn about key aspects of the legacy of the Armenian Genocide and its denial." However, she also argues that the book places too much emphasis on Dink, neglecting the role of other Turkish Armenians as well as broader historical developments that changed the debate, such as the proposed Turkish accession to the EU.
