= Denial of Violence =

2015 book by Fatma Müge Göçek

- Author: Fatma Müge Göçek
- Publication date: 2015

Denial of Violence: Ottoman Past, Turkish Present and Collective Violence Against the Armenians, 1789–2009 is a 2015 book by Turkish sociologist Fatma Müge Göçek which deals with the denial, justification, and rationalization of state-sponsored violence against Armenians in the Ottoman Empire and Turkey from the eighteenth to the twenty-first century, focusing especially on the Armenian genocide and its persistent denial in Turkey. Among the arguments made in the book is that the Armenian genocide was an act of foundational violence that enabled the creation of the Republic of Turkey and its continuing denial is an ideological foundation of the Turkish nation-state. The book was praised by reviewers for its extensive research and methodological innovation, although some noted that it was dense and not easy to read for those not familiar with the topic.

== Publication history ==
Göçek spent 12 years researching and writing the book, which was published by Oxford University Press in 2015.

== Content ==
Göçek analyzes 356 memoirs, written by 307 authors, mostly Turks, for what they have to say about collective anti-Armenian violence. She did not select these works but instead "systematically read all books printed in Turkey in Turkish after the Latin script reform of 1928 that contained people's recollections of what went on around them from the year 1789 to 2009". This systematic approach, Göçek argues, helps the researcher investigate memoirs as sources without falling prey to the biases inherent to such sources. She mainly investigates the ways in which Ottoman and Turkish elites understood, rationalized, justified, and denied "their own culture of anti-Armenian violence through two centuries".

She argues that the Armenian genocide was an act of foundational violence that enabled the creation of the Turkish nation-state and that its denial is an ideological foundation of that state. She analyzes denial as a process, where each episode of violence is built on previous denials and leads to additional denials. According to Göçek, denial is the factor that perpetuates collective violence across centuries.

The book contains an introduction, conclusion, and four chapters: "Imperial Denial of Origins of Violence, 1789–1907", "Young Turk Denial of the Act of Violence, 1908–1918", "Early Republican Denial of Actors of Violence, 1919–1973", and "Late Republican Denial of Responsibility for Violence, 1974–2009".

Göçek expresses hope that her documentation of violence in Ottoman and Turkish sources "will hopefully enable the contemporary Turks to recognise what happened in their past as narrated by their own ancestors".

== Reception ==
Jo Laycock states that "this highly detailed account is by no means an easy introduction"; Göçek presumes knowledge of the Armenian genocide itself as well as willingness to engage with a variety of approaches to the subject matter. However, for specialists it "is a welcome addition to the scholarship" and "conceptually and methodologically sophisticated". Sossie Kasbarian and Kerem Öktem called the book "the finest scholarship" and "a ground-breaking contribution to our knowledge about the Genocide, its denial by the Muslim–Turkish elites and its foundational role for the Turkish nation-state".

Historian Stefan Ihrig criticizes the book for sometimes not challenging her sources when they make false claims. According to Ihrig, the book "holds a mirror to official denial" and readers not familiar with Turkey's official narrative may not appreciate Göcek's achievement. Although "Göcek's experiment perhaps does not entirely succeed", "the resulting book provides an immense treasure trove for readers and future researchers". According to Ihrig, each chapter could have been its own book, with additional contextualization and narrative.

Turkish sociologist Ateş Altınordu praises Göçek's "impressive breadth of research" and "many original insights", as well as contributing to the use of memoirs in sociology and the sociology of emotions. He is critical of the lack of biographical details given to memoirists in the text, forcing the reader to investigate footnotes for details. He concludes that the book is "the definitive study of the denial of the Armenian Genocide", and is likely to remain so "for a long time".

Andrekos Varnava praises Göçek for how "she uses the words of the perpetrators of collective violence to indict themselves" and for "her skilful and theoretically inspired analysis". However, he criticizes the lack of distinction made between genocide and ethnic cleansing and states that, "readers could be put off by the length and density of the chapters". Varnava nevertheless considers the book a "must read" for those interested in Turkish violence and denial as well as the denials of other mass atrocities.

Keith David Watenpaugh states that the book "is vast and defies easy characterization: it is part history, part sociology, and part the journey of a truly thoughtful and engaged intellectual into her own and her family's past". Vicken Cheterian states that Denial of Violence is "a unique book, which will open new perspectives in the study of the dark sides of nationalist modernization". Eldad Ben-Aharon states that the book is an "excellent monograph that offers, for the most part, nuanced interpretations of empirical research to fill a substantial gap in scholarship on this topic". He states that Göçek's "distinguished book" should be read by scholars of genocide studies and especially perpetrator studies.

The book was also criticized for lack of references to recent works on the acts of violence itself, and the conclusion of the book was criticized for moralizing.

== Awards ==
- 2015 Mary Douglas Prize for Best Book, American Sociological Association
