= Maurus Reinkowski =

German Islamist, Turkologist and historian (born 1962)

Maurus Reinkowski (born 1962) is a historian of the Ottoman Empire and Professor of Islamic and Middle Eastern Studies at the University of Basel.

== Works ==
- Reinkowski, Maurus (1995). Filastin, Filistin und Eretz Israel: die späte osmanische Herrschaft über Palästina in der arabischen, türkischen und israelischen Historiographie (in German). K. Schwarz. ISBN 978-3-87997-242-5.
- Reinkowski, Maurus (2005). Die Dinge der Ordnung: eine vergleichende Untersuchung über die osmanische Reformpolitik im 19. Jahrhundert (in German). Oldenbourg. ISBN 978-3-486-57859-1.
- Kieser, Hans-Lukas; Öktem, Kerem; Reinkowski, Maurus (2015). World War I and the End of the Ottomans: From the Balkan Wars to the Armenian Genocide. Bloomsbury Publishing. ISBN 978-0-85772-744-2.
- Maurus Reinkowski, Düzenin Şeyleri, Tanzimat'ın Kelimeleri: 19. Yüzyıl Osmanlı Reform Politikasının Karşılaştırmalı Bir Araştırması, Çeviren: Çiğdem Canan Dikmen, İstanbul: Yapı Kredi Yayınları, 2017, 351 shf., ISBN 9789750840609
