= The Young Turks' Crime Against Humanity =

2011 book by Taner Akçam

First edition

The Young Turks' Crime Against Humanity: The Armenian Genocide and Ethnic Cleansing in the Ottoman Empire is a 2011 book by Taner Akçam, published by Princeton University Press. It discusses the role of the Young Turk movement in the Armenian genocide and other ethnic removals.

The original version of the book is in Turkish. The English version has additional content as well as revisions of the original content. Wolfgang G. Schwanitz wrote in the Jewish Political Studies Review that The Young Turks' Crime Against Humanity unifies the various perspectives of the time period 1913–1918, which the book focuses upon, into one historical narrative. The author states that there was no single decision to eliminate Armenians but instead the momentum to kill them came at multiple stages. Several documents cited by the book had been hitherto unpublished.

It is dedicated to Hrant Dink and to Vahakn Dadrian.

== Reception ==
John Waterbury of Foreign Affairs wrote "the fact that a Turkish historian with access to the Ottoman archives has written this book is of immeasurable significance."

Charles Carter of Origins: Current Events in Historical Perspective, jointly of Ohio State University and Miami University, wrote that the "multi-causal explanation of the genocide is highly convincing".

=== Journal reviews ===
- Adalian, R. P. (2015). "Reviewed work: The Young Turks' Crime against Humanity: The Armenian Genocide and Ethnic Cleansing in the Ottoman Empire, Taner Akçam". Genocide Studies International. 9 (1): 174–178. doi:10.1353/gsp.2015.0004. JSTOR 26986017. S2CID 162820725.
- Anderson, M. L.; Reynolds, M.; Kieser, H. L.; Balakian, P.; Moses, A. D. (2013). "Taner Akçam, The Young Turks' Crime against Humanity: The Armenian Genocide and Ethnic Cleansing in the Ottoman Empire (Princeton, NJ: Princeton University Press, 2012)". Journal of Genocide Research. 15 (4): 463–509. doi:10.1080/14623528.2013.856095. S2CID 73167962.
- Duran, H. (2014). "The Young Turks' Crime against Humanity: The Armenian Genocide and Ethnic Cleansing in the Ottoman Empire". Insight Turkey. 16 (3): 246–247.
- Kapteijns, L. (2013). "The Young Turks' Crime against Humanity: The Armenian Genocide and Ethnic Cleansing in the Ottoman Empire - by Taner Akçam". Domes: Digest of Middle East Studies (Online). 22 (1): 198–200. doi:10.1111/dome.12017.
- Karsh, E. (2013). "Ankara's Unacknowledged Genocide". Middle East Quarterly. 20 (1): 17–26.
- Klein, J. (2013). "The Young Turks' Crime against Humanity: The Armenian Genocide and Ethnic Cleansing in the Ottoman Empire". Journal of World History. 24 (4): 908–913. doi:10.1353/jwh.2013.0111.
- Ryan, S. (2014). "The Young Turks' Crime against Humanity: The Armenian Genocide and Ethnic Cleansing in the Ottoman Empire - by Taner Akçam". Historian. 76 (1): 160–161. doi:10.1111/hisn.12030_48.
- Schull, K. F. (2014). "The Young Turks' Crime against Humanity: The Armenian Genocide and Ethnic Cleansing in the Ottoman Empire. By Taner Akçam. Human Rights and Crimes against Humanity. Edited by Eric D. Weitz.Princeton, NJ: Princeton University Press, 2012". The Journal of Modern History. 86 (4): 974–976. doi:10.1086/678755.
- Schwanitz, W. G. (2013). "The Young Turks' Crime against Humanity: The Armenian Genocide and Ethnic Cleansing in the Ottoman Empire". Jewish Political Studies Review. 25 (1): 97–102.
- Tonoyan, A. H. (2014). "The Young Turks' Crime against Humanity: The Armenian Genocide and Ethnic Cleansing in the Ottoman Empire". Journal of Church and State. 56 (1): 168–169. doi:10.1093/jcs/cst120.
- Üngör, U. Ü. (2012). "Reviewed work: The Young Turks' Crime against Humanity: The Armenian Genocide and Ethnic Cleansing in the Ottoman Empire, Taner Akçam". The American Historical Review. 117 (5): 1703–1704. doi:10.1093/ahr/117.5.1703. JSTOR 23426736.
- Üngör, U. Ü. (2014). "Book review: The Young Turks' Crime against Humanity: The Armenian Genocide and Ethnic Cleansing in the Ottoman Empire". The Journal of Ecclesiastical History. 65 (1): 224–226. doi:10.1017/S0022046913001619.
- Waterbury, J. (2012). "Recent books on international relations: Middle east: The Young Turks' Crime against Humanity: The Armenian Genocide and Ethnic Cleansing in the Ottoman Empire". Foreign Affairs. 91: 186–187.
