= Killing Orders =

2016 book by Taner Akcam

Killing Orders: Talat Pasha's Telegrams and the Armenian Genocide
- First edition
- Author: Taner Akcam
- Original title: Naim Efendi'nin Hatıratı ve Talat Paşa Telgrafları: Krikor Gergeryan Arşivi
- Language: Turkish
- Genre: Non-fiction
- Publisher: İletişim Yayıncılık
- Publication date: 2016

Killing Orders: Talat Pasha's Telegrams and the Armenian Genocide (Turkish: Naim Efendi'nin Hatıratı ve Talat Paşa Telgrafları: Krikor Gergeryan Arşivi "Memoir of Naim Efendi and Talat Pasha Telegrams: Krikor Gergeryan Archive") is a 2016 book from Taner Akcam about the veracity of the primary source evidence of the Armenian genocide, particularly telegrams sent by Talaat Pasha. He addresses dismissal of the authenticity of evidence as a form of Armenian genocide denial. The original Turkish version was published in Istanbul by İletişim Yayınları. The English version, published by Palgrave Macmillan, came in 2018.

Akcam addresses claims made in a 1983 Turkish Historical Society book that Naim Effendi was not a real person; he obtained copies of the individual's memoirs to prove his existence.

Mark Mazower of The New York Review of Books wrote that Akcam's book is "less a conventional history than a kind of forensic exercise designed to lay to rest once and for all any dispute regarding the authenticity of the Naim-Andonian documents, and to demonstrate their importance in helping to understand the state structures that allowed the genocide to take place." Mazower stated that herefore it is "not an easy read".

== Content ==
Much of the content is on following claims and counterclaims in accusations of authenticity or lack thereof from recognition and denialist camps. Mazower stated "The reader feels rather like someone who has stumbled into a fiercely argued courtroom drama."

Akçam responded to Şinasi Orel and Süreyya Yuca's statements that The Memoirs of Naim Bey was fabricated and that Naim didn't exist. Orel and Yuca stated that the Ottomans used 4 and 5 digit encryption codes rather than the 2 and 3 ones used by the documents: Akçam stated that the memoirs are in fact real. He also stated that as the Turkish Armed Forces ATASE archive revealed a document with the signature of Naim, there was proof that Naim was real, and that the Ottoman archives in fact had 2 and 3 digit archival codes.

Akcam came upon photographs of the original telegram in New York, where they were in the possession of Armenian monk Krikor Guerguerian. This can be considered as the "smoking gun" evidence of the Armenian genocide, in which there is talk of deportation "without giving neither food, nor water", no mercy for "agony cries and despair", "deport the orphans, not build orphanages". Also for this reason Eric D. Weitz, a history professor at the City College of New York and an expert on the Armenian genocide, called Mr. Akcam "the Sherlock Holmes of Armenian genocide."

== See also ==
- Talaat Pasha: Father of Modern Turkey, Architect of Genocide
