= Foundational violence =

Violence creating national sovereignty

Foundational violence are acts of violence that create sovereignty, a process that often involves ethnic cleansing or even genocide. Fatma Müge Göçek writes:

It is a truism that all states that engage in nation-building commit collective violence, and it is also the case that such violence is often the most destructive in a nation's history... I argue here that among all acts of violence committed directly or indirectly by states and their governments, those that are temporally closest to the nation's creation myth are silenced and denied the most and the longest because they constitute a foundational violence. It is foundational because any discussion is framed as a direct threat to the legitimacy and stability of the state and society in question.

== Sources ==
- Cocks, Joan (2014). On Sovereignty and Other Political Delusions. Bloomsbury Publishing. ISBN 978-1-78093-356-6.
  - Xavier Mathieu (December 24, 2014). "Review – On Sovereignty and Other Political Delusions". E-International Relations.
- Praeg, Leonhard (September 2007). The Geometry of Violence: Africa, Girard, Modernity. AFRICAN SUN MeDIA. pp. 154–155. ISBN 978-1-920109-75-2.
- Schinkel, Willem (2013). "Regimes of Violence and the Trias Violentiae". European Journal of Social Theory. 16 (3): 310–325. doi:10.1177/1368431013476537. S2CID 145345508.
- Long, Ryan (2007). "The cautious critique of foundational violence in Ignacio Manuel Altamirano's El Zarco". Journal of Latin American Cultural Studies. 16 (1): 81–94. doi:10.1080/13569320601156795. S2CID 170732505.
- Oksala, Johanna (2011). "Foundational Violence". Foucault, Politics, and Violence. Northwestern University Press. ISBN 978-0-8101-2802-6.
