= A Shameful Act =

Book by Taner Akçam

A Shameful Act: The Armenian Genocide and the Question of Turkish Responsibility
- Author: Taner Akçam
- Original title: İnsan Hakları ve Ermeni Sorunu, İttihat ve Terakki'den Kurtuluş Savaşı'na
- Translator: Paul Bessemer
- Language: Turkish
- Subject: Armenian genocide denial
- Genre: Non-fiction
- Publication date: 1999

A Shameful Act: The Armenian Genocide and the Question of Turkish Responsibility (Turkish: İnsan Hakları ve Ermeni Sorunu, İttihat ve Terakki'den Kurtuluş Savaşı'na) is a 1999 book by Taner Akçam about Armenian genocide denial, originally published in Turkish. Paul Bessemer translated content from the original Turkish for the 2006 English translation, and Zoryan Institute members Julie Gilmour and George Shirinian revised the raw translation.

Akçam states in the book that the Committee of Union and Progress (CUP) orchestrated the genocide out of fear of losing additional territory during World War I. Gary J. Bass wrote in The New York Times that the "dense, measured, and footnote-heavy book poses a stern challenge to modern Turkish polemicists". Kirkus Reviews stated that the author "is unsparing in his evidence, including proof that Turkish officials who refused to obey murderous orders were themselves murdered."

It received the 2007 Minnesota Book Award for General Nonfiction.

Kirkus Reviews concluded that the book is "of profound importance to history—and certain to stir up nests of hornets."

The book's title refers to a statement by Mustafa Kemal in which he called the deportation of Armenians a "shameful act". Historian Fatma Ulgen writes that the book "remains strangely silent about Kemal's role in the consolidation of Turkish denial within official Turkish history" and that Akçam's suggestion that Kemal's views of the genocide could serve to foster recognition "rests on a very selective and ahistorical reading of Kemal's texts."

== Editions ==
- Akçam, Taner. İnsan Hakları ve Ermeni Sorunu, İttihat ve Terakki'den Kurtuluş Savaşı'na ("Human Rights and the Armenian Question, from the [Committee of] Union and Progress to Liberation War"), Ankara: İmge Kitabevi, 1999.
