= Krikor Guerguerian =

Catholic clergy and archivist of the Armenian Genocide (1911 – 1988)

Krikor Guerguerian (12 May 1911 (Gürün) – 7 May 1988 (New York)) was a Reverend Father of the Catholic Church. He is known for the Krikor Guerguerian Archive, a collection of documents concerning the Armenian genocide.

== Early life ==
Guerguerian was the youngest of sixteen children. He had eight sisters and seven brothers. Only six survived the Armenian genocide. During this genocide, he witnessed his parents' murder. He and a brother escape to Beirut in 1916, where he entered an orphanage.

In 1925, he entered the Zımmar (Bzemmar) Catholic Monastery-School in Lebanon. In the early 1930s, he earned a degree at St. Joseph University in Beirut. After this, he went to Rome to enter Levonian University to study theology. He became a Catholic monk in 1937.

The same year he began his doctorate on the Armenian Genocide.

== Career ==
After becoming a monk, he settled in Cairo, where his younger brother lived and worked as a priest. Around 1952, he met Kürt Mustafa Pasha in Cairo. Mustafa Pasha was a former presiding judge at the Istanbul 1st Military Tribunal, which ruled in the trials against CUP members. Mustafa told him that the copies of judicial documents were sent to the Constantinople Patriarchate of the Armenian Church. Guerguerian attempted to learn where these documents were sent. He found them in the Jerusalem Patriarchate of the Armenian Church and photographed the documents. Later, he moved to the US where he worked as a priest. Copies of these documents are housed in the Krikor Guerguerian Archive of Clark University in Worcester, Massachusetts.

== Publications ==
Yozghati Hayaspanutean Vaweragrakan Patmutiwne (Documentary History of the Armenocide in Yozgat)
