= Talaat Pasha: Father of Modern Turkey, Architect of Genocide =

Book by Hans-Lukas Kieser

- Author: Hans-Lukas Kieser
- Language: English
- Publisher: Princeton University Press
- Publication date: 2018
- Publication place: United States
- Pages: 552
- ISBN: 978-1-4008-8963-1

Talaat Pasha: Father of Modern Turkey, Architect of Genocide is a 2018 academic book by Hans-Lukas Kieser, published by Princeton University Press. It is a biography of Talaat Pasha. As of 2018 there had been no recent biographies of Talaat, nor of Enver Pasha, in western European languages. The book discusses the author's thesis that Talaat was co-Father of the Nation to modern Turkey along with Mustafa Kemal Atatürk, as well as Talaat's rule and significance.

The book argues that Talaat and other Ottoman officials ordered and managed the Armenian genocide.

== Background ==
Kieser began his concentration in Middle East history in the 1980s, after he became interested in the 1980 Turkish coup d'état.

Keiser stated that a lack of biographies in languages other than Turkish about Talaat and a desire to contextualise the consequences of the Ottoman Empire's final decade of existence were his reasons for writing the book.

== Contents ==
The book focuses on Talaat's political ambitions and ideology and the circumstances behind his political career, while not focusing on his early life.

The book includes a bibliography and supplemental notes, totaling about 70 pages. Alan Whitehorn wrote in the Armenian Weekly that some of the photographs in the book were infrequently published and therefore rare to find.

Mark Mazower of The New York Review of Books stated that the "prose is pedestrian".

=== Positions ===
Kieser describes Talaat as being a father of the nation of modern Turkey, along with Atatürk, rather than Talaat being the sole father. Kieser cites cooperation between the two during the years 1919-1921.

Kieser argued that Talaat was the de facto ruler of the Ottoman Empire during much of the Three Pashas period, since the other two Pashas possibly focused on external issues. Kieser stated "It is fine to call the regime a triumvirate for the year 1913, when Talaat, Enver and Cemal resided in the Ottoman capital and the CUP single-party rule was freshly established, but not afterwards."

Kieser also states that the trends of Talaat's rule were extended by that of Kemal Ataturk rather than Ataturk contradicting them, and that the Nazi Party acquired its "paradigm" from Talaat's rule.

== Reception ==
Mazower stated that compared to Killing Orders, Talaat Pasha has "a bigger picture" of the pre-Armenian Genocide events and World War I. Mazower concluded that Talaat Pasha "is invaluable".

Whitehorn concluded that the book "is a well-researched and interesting read" and that "It is destined to be an important contribution to our understanding of the Young Turk era and the Armenian genocide."
