= Zoryan Institute =

Nonprofit organization

Coordinates: 42.417°N 71.156°W

The Zoryan Institute is an independent, nonprofit research organization founded in 1982 in Cambridge, Massachusetts, by Garbis Kortian, Gerard J. Libaridian, and K. M. Greg Sarkissian. It is a registered charity in the United States and Canada that promotes the study and recognition of the Armenian genocide as well as other genocides throughout history. The institute specializes in the interdisciplinary study of genocide, human rights, diaspora studies, and historical memory, conducting academic research, archival documentation, oral-history projects, conferences, educational programs, and scholarly publishing. It has collaborated with a number of universities as well as UN-sponsored programs.

== Collaborations ==
The Zoryan Institute has established partnerships and collaborative relationships with international academic institutions, human-rights organizations, and intergovernmental institutions. Its Genocide and Human Rights University Program, established in 2002, was developed in partnership with the University of Minnesota and subsequently the University of Toronto, while its peer-reviewed journals Diaspora: A Journal of Transnational Studies and Genocide Studies International have been published in collaboration with the University of Toronto Press. Other academic collaborations have included the George Washington University Law School, Rowan University, Arizona State University, and the Balsillie School of International Affairs, involving conferences and educational initiatives concerning genocide prevention, human rights, international law, and forced displacement.

In 2015, the organization's International Institute for Genocide and Human Rights Studies formed a human-rights coalition with the Turkish Human Rights Association and the Truth Justice Memory Center, submitting a joint third-party intervention before the European Court of Human Rights in Perinçek v. Switzerland, concerning the relationship between freedom of expression, discrimination, and genocide denial.

The organization has also maintained documented relationships with institutions associated with the United Nations. In October 2006, it partnered with the University for Peace, an international institution established by the United Nations General Assembly, to organize the high-level forum Capacity Building for Peace and Development: Roles of Diaspora, bringing together more than 70 scholars, government officials, and international experts to examine the contributions of diaspora communities to peacebuilding and international development. The conference was addressed by Sheikha Haya Rashed Al Khalifa, president of the 61st United Nations General Assembly, and chaired by Mohamed Sahnoun, a former special adviser to the UN Secretary-General and vice-president of the University for Peace's council. Earlier that year, the institute's director of genocide research, Vahakn Dadrian, participated in the forum Genocide Then and Now: Lessons Learned for the 21st Century, held at United Nations headquarters on March 30, 2006. Other participants included Juan E. Méndez, the UN Secretary-General's special adviser on the prevention of genocide.

== Academic reception ==
The organization has received positive assessments from a few scholars in genocide and human rights studies. In a 2011 appeal published in Genocide Studies and Prevention, a group of international scholars — including Israel Charny, Gregory Stanton, Frank Chalk, Robin Cohen, Samuel Totten, and William Schabas — characterized the Institute as a "world-class academic institution", recognizing its contributions to research, education, and genocide prevention.

In a 2011 article, scholar Joyce Apsel examined the Institute's Genocide and Human Rights university program, describing it as an innovative educational initiative and a valuable pedagogical model for comparative genocide and human rights education.

In a 2007 editorial in the Journal of Genocide Research, historian Dominik J. Schaller stated that he considered the organization's "scientific and pedagogic activities to be of great value" and that it is "an influential actor in memory politics".

Its scholarly network and board have included genocide and human-rights specialists such as William Schabas, Alex Alvarez, Joyce Apsel, Yair Auron, Andrew Woolford, and Maureen Hiebert, alongside researchers from other academic disciplines.

Anthropologist Engseng Ho credited the Zoryan Institute-funded journal Diaspora with having "popularized the term [diaspora] in academia", contributing to the expansion of diaspora studies beyond its traditional subjects to encompass a wider range of transnational communities.
