= Vicken Cheterian =

Lebanese-born journalist and author

Vicken Cheterian (Western Armenian: Վիգէն Չըթըրեան, Eastern Armenian: Վիգեն Չըթըրյան) is a Lebanese-born journalist and author, who teaches international relations at Webster University Geneva. He has also lectured at University of Geneva and SOAS University of London (2012–14). Cheterian is also a columnist for the Istanbul-based weekly Agos. He holds a PhD from Graduate Institute of International and Development Studies (IUHEI).

== Works ==
- Cheterian, Vicken (2008). War and Peace in the Caucasus: Ethnic Conflict and the New Geopolitics. Columbia University. ISBN 978-0-231-70064-1.
- Cheterian, Vicken, ed. (2013). From Perestroika to Rainbow Revolutions: Reform and Revolution After Socialism. Hurst. ISBN 978-1-84904-144-7.
- Cheterian, Vicken (2015). Open Wounds: Armenians, Turks and a Century of Genocide. Hurst. ISBN 978-1-84904-458-5.
- “Roots of ISIS Violence and the Killing Fields of the Middle East,” Survival, Vol. 57, Issue 2, 2015, pp. 105–118.
- "Origins and Trajectory of the Conflicts in the Caucasus", Europe-Asia Studies, Vol. 64, No. 9, 2012, pp. 1625–1649.
- "Karabakh Conflict After Kosovo: No Way Out?", Nationalities Papers, Vol. 40, No. 5, 2012, pp. 703–720.
- "Kyrgyzstan, Central asia's Island of Instability", Survival, Vol. 52, No. 5, 2010, pp. 21–27.
- "History, memory and international relations: the Armenian diaspora and Armenian-Turkish relations", International Relations, No. 141, 2010, pp. 7–24.
- "The August 2008 War in Georgia: from ethnic conflict to border wars", Central Asian Survey, Vol. 28, No. 2, 2009, pp. 155–170.
- "From Reform and Transition to 'Colored Revolutions'" Journal of Communist Studies and Transition Politics, Vol. 25, No. 2, 2009, pp. 136–160.
- "Georgia's Rose Revolution: Change or Repetition? Tension between State-Building and Modernization Projects", Nationalities Papers, Vol. 36, No. 4, 2008, pp. 689–712.
