= Kerem Öktem =

Kerem Öktem (born 1969) is a Turkish political scientist and professor at the Università Ca' Foscari in Italy. Between 2014 and 2019 he worked as a professor at the University of Graz. In a 2013 interview Öktem stated that his field of research was:

The problems of minorities, otherness and exclusion with the idea of reconciliation and recognition, which pose the major questions of the nation-state. Its inherent violence and the extreme forms it can take, war, forced displacement, ethnic cleansing and genocide: all of these have shaped the fate of Turkey, its regions and their people.
