= Fatma Müge Göçek =

Turkish sociologist

Fatma Müge Göçek is a Turkish sociologist and professor at the University of Michigan. She wrote the book Denial of Violence in 2015 concerning the persecution of Armenians in the Ottoman Empire and Turkey, for which she received the Mary Douglas award for best book from the American Sociological Association. In 2017, she won a Distinguished Faculty Achievement Award from the university.

== Biography ==
Having obtained both her BSc and MSc at the Bogaziçi University in Istanbul, she went to Paris to learn French. In 1981, she moved to the Princeton University from where she received an additional MSc in 1984 and a Doctorate in 1988.

Since 1988 she lectured at the University of Michigan. She was appointed a full Professor in 2012 and lectures in the Department of Sociology and the Programme in Women's Studies.

She was a signatory to the I apologize campaign in 2008, which demanded that Turkey takes responsibility for the Armenian genocide.

== Personal life ==
Göçek was named Fatma after her great-grandmother.

== Works ==
- Göçek, Fatma Müge (1987). East Encounters West: France and the Ottoman Empire in the Eighteenth Century. Oxford University Press. ISBN 978-0-19-536433-0.
- Göçek, Fatma Müge, ed. (1988). Political Cartoons in the Middle East. Princeton, New Jersey: Markus Wiener Publications.
- Gocek, Fatma Muge; Shiva, Balaghi, eds. (1995). Reconstructing Gender in the Middle East: Tradition, Identity, and Power. Columbia University Press. ISBN 978-0-231-51391-3.
- Göçek, Fatma Müge (1996). Rise of the Bourgeoisie, Demise of Empire: Ottoman Westernization and Social Change. Oxford University Press. ISBN 978-0-19-509925-6.
- Göçek, Fatma Müge, ed. (2002). Social Constructions of Nationalism in the Middle East. SUNY Press. ISBN 978-0-7914-5198-4.
- Göçek, Fatma Müge (2011). The Transformation of Turkey: Redefining State and Society from the Ottoman Empire to the Modern Era. London: L. B. Tauris.
- Suny, Ronald Grigor; Göçek, Fatma Müge; Naimark, Norman M., eds. (2011). A Question of Genocide: Armenians and Turks at the End of the Ottoman Empire. Oxford University Press. ISBN 978-0-19-979276-4.
- Göçek, Fatma Müge (2015). Denial of Violence: Ottoman Past, Turkish Present and Collective Violence Against the Armenians, 1789–2009. Oxford University Press. ISBN 978-0-19-933420-9.
