= Taner Akçam =

Turkish-German historian and sociologist (born 1953)

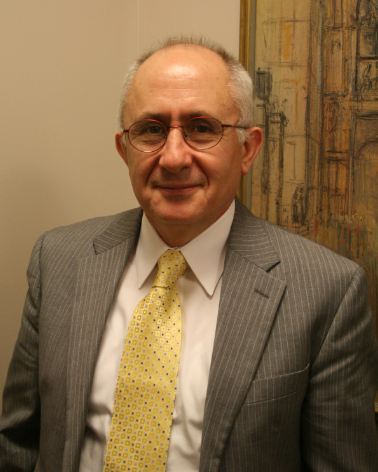
- Akçam in Toronto, 2013
- Born: 1953 (age 72–73); Ölçek, Ardahan Province, Turkey
- Education: Middle East Technical University (BS); Leibniz University Hannover (PhD)
- Occupation: Historian
- Known for: Discussion of Armenian genocide, 1977 imprisonment

Altuğ Taner Akçam (born 1953) is a Turkish-German historian and sociologist. During the 1990s, he was the first Turkish scholar to acknowledge the Armenian genocide, and has written several books on the genocide, such as A Shameful Act (1999), From Empire to Republic: Turkish Nationalism and the Armenian Genocide (2004), The Young Turks' Crime Against Humanity (2012), and Killing Orders (2018). He is recognized as a "leading international authority" on the subject. Akçam's frequent participation in public debates on the legacy of the genocide have been compared to Theodor Adorno's role in postwar Germany.

Akçam argues for an attempt to reconcile the differing Armenian and Turkish narratives of the genocide, and to move away from the behaviour which uses those narratives to support national stereotypes, saying: "We have to re-think the problem and place both societies in the centre of our analysis. This change of paradigm should focus on creating a new cultural space that includes both societies, a space in which both sides have the chance to learn from each other."

== Early life ==
Akçam was born in Ölçek village near Ardahan, Turkey to Dursun and Perihan Akçam. His family are of Turkish Meskhetian origin. Akçam has stated that he was raised in "a very secular family," with his father being an atheist. He studied economics at the Middle East Technical University in Ankara, and graduated in 1976. In 1974, Akçam was arrested for participating in student protests against the Turkish invasion of Cyprus. In 1975 he was arrested for distributing leaflets and placing posters around the city. (Akçam notes that "one had to obtain permission from what is now called the Security General Directorate's Special Inspection Branch Directorate for the Associations, and that even with a special permit in hand, one could be arbitrarily arrested and apprehended at police headquarters for 3–5 days.")

On March 9, 1976, soon after graduating from university, while a graduate student at the same department, he was arrested for his involvement in producing a student journal that focused on the treatment of Kurds in Turkey. Devrimci Gençlik (Revolutionary Youth) was the journal of a radical leftist organization, Devrimci Yol ("Revolutionary Path"). Akçam explained that he accepted the editorship position, aged 22, as none of his peers would, knowing that it could land him in jail. His fears materialized when he received a nine-year sentence in early 1977, which resulted in Amnesty International naming him as a prisoner of conscience. He served for a year before escaping from Ankara Central Prison on March 12, 1977, using the leg of an iron stove to dig a hole. He received political asylum from West Germany in 1978, where he obtained citizenship and resided until obtaining his doctorate degree in 1995.

== Academic career ==
In August 1988, Akçam began work as a research scientist at the Hamburg Institute for Social Research following an invitation from Iranian scholar Hadi Ressesade. Ressesade, who was studying torture in Iran, proposed that Akçam could do a study on torture in Turkey. Akçam decided to study Armenians after meeting a German librarian of Lebanese-Armenian origin, who urged him to do so. In 1991, he organized a workshop on the Ottoman Military Tribunal that judged the crimes of the Armenian genocide. He later recalled, "As I progressed in my readings of Abdul Hamid's massacres, I thought to myself: I know the history of the French Revolution, of Russia in 1917, of Chinese Communism, but I do not know Turkish history." Akçam was initially reluctant to use the word "genocide" for anti-Armenian violence, because "by qualifying it a genocide you become a member of a collective associated to a crime, not any crime but to the ultimate crime". He received his PhD from Leibniz University Hannover with a dissertation titled, Turkish Nationalism and the Armenian Genocide: On the Background of the Military Tribunals in Istanbul between 1919 and 1922.

Akçam is a former student of fellow genocide scholar, Vahakn Dadrian. In 1997, a Dutch documentary titled "Een Muur van Stilte" (A Wall of Silence), written and directed by Dorothée Forma of the Humanist Broadcasting Foundation (Dutch: Humanistische Omroep Stichting), was made about their academic relationship.

Akçam was Visiting Associate Professor of History at the University of Minnesota, United States before joining Clark University's Strassler Family Center for Holocaust and Genocide Studies.

After the assassination of Hrant Dink in 2007, Akçam attended Dink's funeral in Istanbul. According to the Intelligence Report, the journal of the Southern Poverty Law Center,

Dink's friend and ideological ally Taner Akçam, a distinguished Turkish historian and sociologist on the faculty of the University of Minnesota's Center for Holocaust and Genocide Studies, attended Dink's funeral in Turkey, despite the considerable risk to his own life. Akçam, a leading international authority on the Armenian genocide, was marked for death by Turkish ultranationalists following the November 2006 publication of his book A Shameful Act: The Armenian Genocide and The Question of Turkish Responsibility. The book is a definitive history based in large part on official documents from Turkish government archives.

In 2008, when Akçam's appointment as the chairman of Armenian genocide studies at Clark University was questioned by local Turks as biased, Deborah Dwork, director of the Strassler Family Center for Holocaust and Genocide Studies at Clark, said that "ethnic or religious identity is not crucial to any appointment," and that "they hire the best scholars in the pool".

On 29 January 2020, French President Emmanuel Macron awarded Akçam the medal for courage for "denouncing denial" of the Armenian genocide.

== Legal disputes ==
In January 2007, the Turkish government officially launched an investigation against Akçam regarding an October 6, 2006, newspaper column in the Turkish-Armenian journal Agos. In it Akçam criticized the prosecution of Agos managing editor Hrant Dink for using the term "genocide", regarding the Armenian genocide. The use of the term was construed by the prosecutor's office as the criminal offense of "insulting Turkishness" under Article 301 of Turkey's penal code. Highlighting the term "genocide", Akçam declared himself an accessory to the charges against Hrant Dink, and urged readers to join in Dink's support. Later in January 2007 an Istanbul court decided not to pursue the charges against Akçam.

Akçam faced harassment after discovering the identity of the creator of the Web site Tall Armenian Tale, which had called Akçam a "turncoat" and posted his personal information. Fearing reprisals after the assassination of Hrant Dink, Akçam entreated the Coordination Council of Armenian Organisations in France and president Sarkozy to pressure Ankara to protect him.

On February 16, 2007 Akçam was detained in Canada at the airport in Montreal for nearly four hours after arriving on a flight from the United States. He was due to give a lecture at the invitation of the McGill University Faculty of Law and Concordia University. In explaining his detention, Taner Akçam says that Canadian authorities referred to an inaccurate version of his biography on Wikipedia from around December 24, 2006, which called him a terrorist.

On February 18, 2007 he was also detained at the US border and has been so far unable to find out the reason for his being detained there. While on a lecture tour in 2007 he faced further harassment by persons turning up and disrupting his speaking engagements. The Wikipedia biography was altered as part of an internet campaign against him by the website "Tall Armenian Tale".

In October 2011, Akçam won a judgment in the European Court of Human Rights, which ruled that the Turkish laws against "denigrating Turkishness" were a violation of freedom of expression.

== Bibliography ==
- Killing Orders: Talat Pasha’s Telegrams and the Armenian Genocide (2018)
- Akçam, Taner; Kurt, Ümit (November 1, 2017). The Spirit of the Laws: The Plunder of Wealth in the Armenian Genocide. Berghahn Books. ISBN 978-1-78238-624-7.
- Taner Akçam (2012) The Young Turks' Crime Against Humanity: The Armenian Genocide and Ethnic Cleansing in the Ottoman Empire, Princeton University Press ISBN 978-069-11-5333-9
- Akçam, Taner (January 2008). Ermeni Meselesi Hallolunmuştur (in Turkish). İletişim. ISBN 978-975-05-0562-1. (The Armenian Issue is Resolved)
- Taner Akçam (May 16, 2006) A Shameful Act : The Armenian Genocide and the Question of Turkish Responsibility, Metropolitan Books ISBN 0-8050-7932-7 (received the 2007 Minnesota Book Award for General Nonfiction.)
- Taner Akçam (Sep. 4, 2004) From Empire to Republic : Turkish Nationalism and the Armenian Genocide, Zed Books ISBN 1-84277-527-8
- Dialogue across an international divide: Essays towards a Turkish-Armenian dialogue, Zoryan Institute, 2001, ISBN 1-895485-03-7; - About the book and foreword
- (in Turkish) İnsan hakları ve Ermeni sorunu: İttihat ve Terakki'den Kurtuluş Savaşı'na, İmge Kitabevi, 1. edition, 1999, ISBN 975-533-246-4
- Rethinking Modernity and National Identity in Turkey, Publications on the Near East, University of Washington, Sibel Bozdogan (Editor), University of Washington Press, July, 1997, ISBN 0-295-97597-0
- (in German) Armenien und der Völkermord: Die Istanbuler Prozesse und die türkische Nationalbewegung, Hamburger Edition, 1. edition, 1996, ISBN 3-930908-26-3
- (in Turkish) Siyasi kültürümüzde zulüm ve işkence (Araştırma-inceleme dizisi), İletişim Yayıncılık, 1. edition, 1992, ISBN 975-470-249-7
