= Vahakn Dadrian =

Armenian-American sociologist and historian (1926–2019)

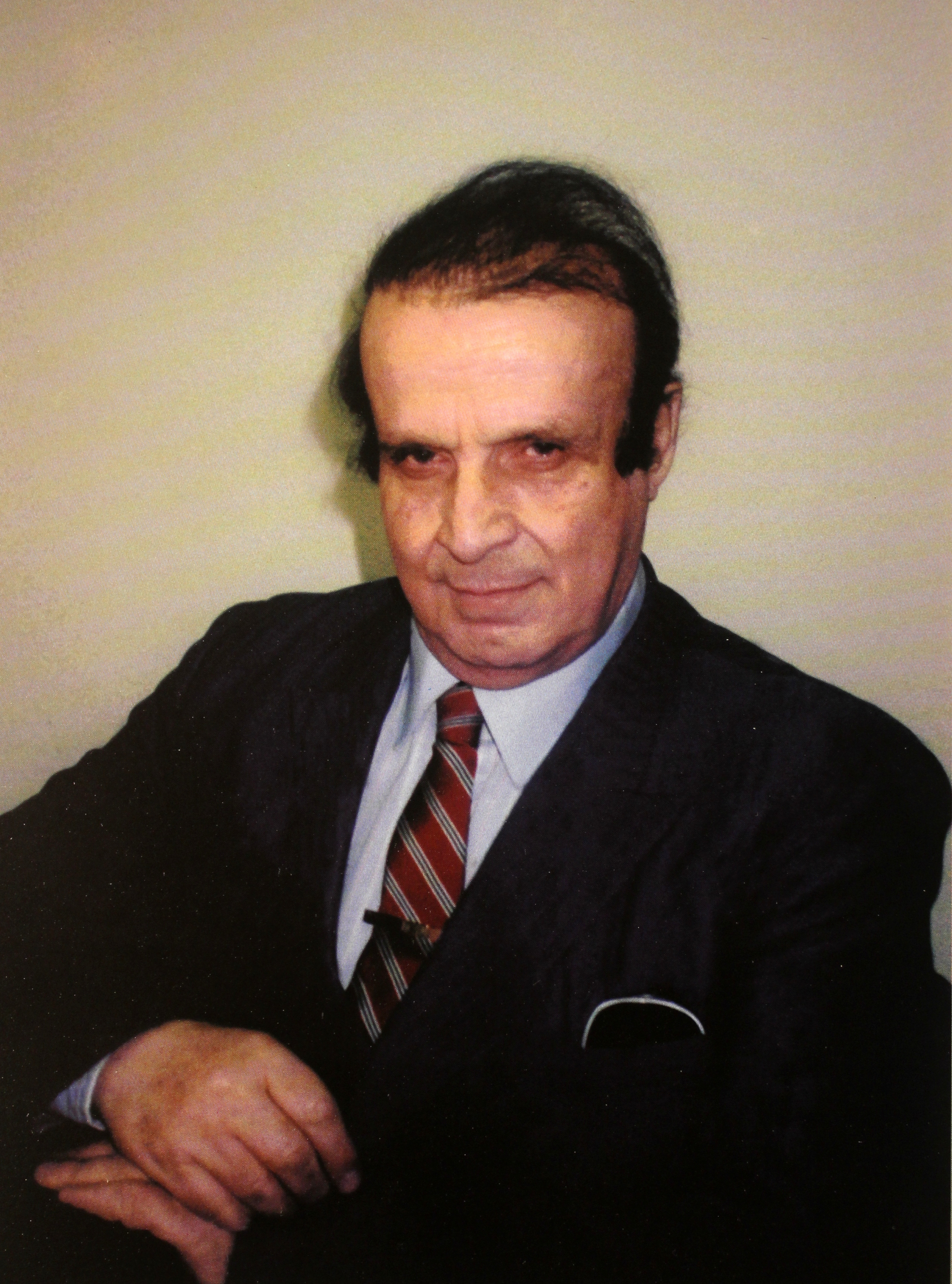
- Dadrian in 2015
- Born: Vahakn Norair Dadrian; May 26, 1926; Istanbul (Constantinople), Turkey
- Died: August 2, 2019 (aged 93); Geneseo, New York, U.S.
- Awards: see below
- Scientific career
- Fields: Sociology
- Workplaces: Zoryan Institute

Signature
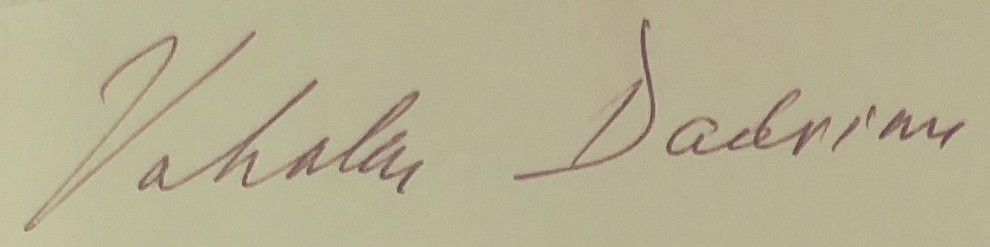

Vahakn Norair Dadrian (Armenian: Վահագն Տատրեան; 26 May 1926 – 2 August 2019) was an Armenian-American sociologist and historian, born in Turkey, professor of sociology, historian, and an expert on the Armenian genocide.

== Life ==
Dadrian was born in 1926 in Turkey to a family that lost many members during the Armenian genocide. Dadrian first studied mathematics at the University of Berlin, after which he decided to switch to a completely different field, and studied philosophy at the University of Vienna, and later, international law at the University of Zurich. He completed his Ph.D. in sociology under Robert Redfield at the University of Chicago. Dadrian understood many languages, including German, English, French, Turkish, Ottoman Turkish, and Armenian, and worked in the archives of different countries. Thomas de Waal suggests that Dadrian's research was motivated by a political agenda, noting that Dadrian wrote a 1964 letter to The New York Times asking: "on what conceivable grounds can the Armenians be denied the right to reclaim their ancestral territories which Turkey absorbed after massacring their inhabitants?"

He was awarded an honorary doctorate degree for his research in the field of Armenian Genocide Studies by the Armenian National Academy of Sciences, and later, in 1998, he was made a member of the academy and honored by the President of Armenia, the republic's highest cultural award, the Khorenatzi medal. In 1999, Dadrian was awarded on behalf of the Holy See of Cilicia the Mesrob Mashdots Medal. The Harry Frank Guggenheim Foundation sponsored him as director of a large Genocide study project, which culminated with the publication of articles, mainly in the Holocaust and Genocide studies magazines. He was the keynote speaker at the centennial of the John Marshall Law School and delivered a lecture to the British House of Commons in 1995. He also received the Ellis Island Medal of Honor. He has lectured extensively in French, English and German in the Free University of Berlin, the universities in Munich, Parma, Turin, Zurich, Uppsala, Frankfurt, Cologne, Bochum, Münster, Amsterdam, Utrecht, Geneva, Brussels and UNESCO's Paris center.

In 1970–1991, Dadrian was a professor of sociology at State University of New York at Geneseo.

Dadrian was the director of Genocide Research at Zoryan Institute.

== Death ==
Dadrian died on 2 August 2019, at the age of 93. After his death, the President of Armenia Armen Sarkissian sent a letter of condolences to Dadrian's family and friends. In accordance with his wishes, his remains were cremated and transported to Armenia for burial. Dadrian was buried in Tokhmakh Cemetery in Yerevan, Armenia after a state ceremony and visitation at the Armenian National Academy of Sciences.

In August 2022, Dadrian's former student and colleague Taner Akçam and others brought attention to the fact that the historian's grave in Yerevan's Tokhmakh Cemetery had been left unmarked and untended. The grave was then cleaned up and a temporary marker was placed. A state burial commission had been established by the Armenian government in 2019 to attend to Dadrian's funeral. The spokesperson of the Ministry of Foreign Affairs of Armenia explained on Twitter that work on Dadrian's gravestone had been delayed due to "objective reasons" such as the COVID-19 pandemic and the 2020 Nagorno-Karabakh War, but would resume soon.

== Reception ==
Roger W. Smith praised Dadrian's book The History of the Armenian Genocide as a "rare work, over 20 years in the making, that is at once fascinating to read, comprehensive in scope, and unsurpassed in the documentation of the events it describes." According to William Schabas, the president of the International Association of Genocide Scholars, "Dadrian's historical research on the Armenian Genocide is informed by a rich grasp of the legal issues", and "his contribution both to historical and legal scholarship is enormous."

A specialist on the Armenian Genocide of 1915–23, his many contributions to the investigation of that event, through multilingual original research in a number of archival collections throughout the world, has stamped him as one of foremost thinkers on the nature of the Armenian Genocide and how it was carried out.

— Paul R. Bartrop and Steven L. Jacobs, Fifty Key Thinkers on the Holocaust and Genocide, p. 79

According to David Bruce MacDonald, Dadrian is a "towering figure in the field of Armenian genocide history". Taner Akcam writes that by employing Justin McCarthy's own method of calculating population figures and classifying individuals, Dadrian has shown the ridiculousness of the claim that "the events of 1915 were in fact a civil war between the Armenians and Turks". German Swiss scholar Hans-Lukas Kieser writes that the documents related to fifteen Turkish ministers published by V. Dadrian show best the ministers' conception of their responsibility in the "abuses" committed against Ottoman Armenians.

De Waal states that "The analysis that Dadrian presents comes across today as rather Orientalist, a more sophisticated version of the postwar Allied Turcophobic literature." De Waal as well as Malcolm E. Yapp of London University, state that Dadrian's work more closely resembles a prosecutor's argument than analytic history. Dadrian's theory that the genocide resulted from prewar patterns, was caused by Islam and "the repressive and sanguinary aspects of Ottoman culture" has been rejected by the majority of 21st century historians, although expounded in the 2019 book The Thirty-Year Genocide. Ronald Suny explains the shift away from the previous historiography: "neither Dadrian nor Balakian explain why religion should have led to genocidal violence in the first year of the World War but not throughout Ottoman and Islamic history".

According to Donald Bloxham, the accusations leveled by Dadrian "are often simply unfounded", especially "the idea of a German role in the formation of genocidal policy". Bloxham states that while Dadrian supports the authenticity of the so-called "Ten Commandments", on the other hand, "Most serious historians accept that this document is dubious at best, and probably a fake." According to German historian Tessa Hofmann, "Dadrian’s inconsistencies have been abundantly criticized by scholars".

Mary Schaeffer Conroy, professor of Russian history at University of Colorado Denver, and Hilmar Kaiser criticize Dadrian's tone, and failure to use Turkish archival sources.

== Sexual misconduct ==
Soon after he settled to United States, on 4 January 1955, he was arrested in Chicago on sex crime charges involving a 10-year-old boy. According to the report in Chicago Daily Tribune, Dadrian was arrested in his home by a police officer on complaint of the boy's father and charged with crime against nature and crime against a child. The child told police that Dadrian had stopped him on the street and persuaded to go to Dadrian's home, asking the boy to carry a package.

In 1979, Dadrian was reported by five students at SUNY Geneseo for sexual harassment. In 1981, an arbitrator found Dadrian guilty on four charges but dismissed some others. He ruled that Dadrian should be suspended for one month without pay. Following this decision, members of the university community formed the group Geneseo Committee Against Sexual Harassment and hundreds of people signed a petition urging college administrators to "protect students from further harassment by Professor Dadrian". Dadrian was relieved from his position in 1991 following new allegations of sexual harassment. On April 24, 1990, Dadrian returned to college after attending several international conferences on genocide studies and began harassing his 18-year-old student. The college administration offered the 64-year-old professor voluntary resignation, but Dadrian appealed the decision and lost.

== Bibliography ==
Dadrian's books and articles have been translated into more than 10 languages:

- Autopsie du Génocide Arménien. Trans. Marc & Mikaël Nichanian. Brussels: Éditions Complexe, 1995, 266p.
- Haykakan Tsekhaspanut`iune Khorhtaranayin ev Patmagitakan Knnarkumnerov (The treatment of the Ottoman genocide by the Ottoman parliament and its historical analysis). Watertown, MA: Baikar, 1995, 147p.
- Jenosid Ulusal ve Uluslararasi Hukuk Sorunu Olarak: 1915 Ermeni Olay ve Hukuki Sonuçlar [Genocide as a problem of national and international law: The World War I Armenian case and its contemporary legal ramifications]. Trans. Yavuz Alogan. Istanbul: Belge Uluslararas Yaynclk, 1995, 221p.
- The History of the Armenian Genocide: Ethnic Conflict from the Balkans to Anatolia to the Caucasus. Providence, RI & Oxford: Berghahn Books, 1995, 452p.
- German Responsibility in the Armenian Genocide: A Review of the Historical Evidence of German Complicity. Watertown, MA: Blue Crane Books, 1996, 304p.
- Histoire du génocide arménien: Conflits nationaux des Balkans au Caucase. Traduit de l'anglais par Marc Nichanian. Paris: Stock, 1996, 694p.
- The Key Elements in the Turkish Denial of the Armenian Genocide: A Case Study of Distortion and Falsification. Cambridge, MA and Toronto: Zoryan Institute, 1999, 84p.
- Warrant for Genocide: Key Elements of Turko-Armenian Conflict. New Brunswick and London: Transaction Publishers, 1999, 214p.
- Los elementos clave en el negacionismo Turco del Genocidio Armenia: un estudio de distorsión y falsificación. Translated by Eduardo A. Karsaclian. Buenos Aires: Fundación Armenia, 2002, 79p.
- Historia Tis Armenikan Genoktonias [History of the Armenian Genocide]. Athens: Stokhastis, 2002, 685p.
- Historia del Genocidio Armenio. Conflictos étnicos de los Balcanes a Anatolia y al Cáucaso. Translated by Eduardo A. Karsaclian. Buenos Aires: Imago Mundi, 2008, 434p.

== Awards ==
Awards granted to Dadrian include:

- Citation of Merit on the 80th Anniversary of the Armenian Genocide (1995)
- Movses Khorenatsi medal (1998)
- Nagorno-Karabakh Republic, Atayan Memorial Gold Medal (2000)
- John Marshall Law School, 100th Anniversary Lifetime Achievement Medal April (2000)
- Veritas Gold Medal of Harvard University (2001)
- Ellis Island Medal of Honor
- International Association of Genocide Scholars, Lifetime Achievement Award (2005)
- U.S. Congress Medal of Esteem for Scholarship (2005)
- St. Sahag and St. Mesrob Medal and Encyclical from Karekin II, Catholicos of All Armenians (2005)
- President of the Republic Prize Gold Medal of Armenia (2009)
