= Hans-Lukas Kieser =

Swiss historian

Hans-Lukas Kieser (born 1957) is a Swiss historian of the late Ottoman Empire and Turkey, Professor of modern history at the University of Zurich and president of the Research Foundation Switzerland-Turkey in Basel. He is an author of books and articles in several languages.

He became interested in Turkey and the Ottoman Empire while studying at the University of Basel where he met refugees from the 1980 Turkish military coup. This interest led to a PhD thesis which later was released by the Turkish publisher İletişim.

He has been a lecturer or invited professor at Stanford University (2010); University of Michigan (2008); and other universities including the Bamberg University, and invited scholar at the School for Advanced Studies in the Social Sciences in Paris, France and the Bilgi University in Turkey. He received fellowships from academic institutions in Basel, Zurich and Freiburg (FRIAS), and from the Swiss National Science Foundation.

He currently lectures as a Professor of Modern History at the University of Newcastle, Australia.

== Awards ==
- 2017, Boghossian Prize for his contributions in the research of the Armenian genocide
- 2016, Presidential Award by the Armenian President Serzh Sargsyan in 2016
- 2000, Garbis Papazian-Prize in 2000

== Selected bibliography ==
- Nearest East: American millennialism and mission to the Middle East, Philadelphia, P.A.: Temple University Press, 2010. Revised paperback edition 2012.
- A quest for belonging. Anatolia beyond empire and nation (19th–21st centuries), Istanbul: Isis, 2007. Reprint: Piscataway N.J.: Gorgias Press, 2010.
- Vorkämpfer der “neuen Türkei”. Revolutionäre Bildungseliten am Genfersee (1868–1939) [Pioneers of the "New Turkey": Revolutionary elites at Lake Geneva], Zürich: Chronos, 2005.
- Der verpasste Friede. Mission, Ethnie und Staat in den Ostprovinzen der Türkei 1839–1938 [The squandered peace. Missionaries, ethnicity and the state in the eastern provinces of Turkey 1839–1938], Zürich: Chronos, 2000.
- (ed.)Turkey beyond nationalism: Towards post-nationalist identities, London: I. B. Tauris, 2006. Revised paperback edition 2012. ISBN 9781780763996
- Kieser, Hans-Lukas (2018). Talaat Pasha : father of modern Turkey, architect of genocide. Princeton University Press. p. 532. ISBN 978-0-691-15762-7.
- (ed.) The end of the Ottomans, the Genocide of 1915 and the Politics of Turkish Nationalism, I.B.Tauris, 2019.
