= Armenian–Jewish relations =

Armenian–Jewish relations are complex, often due to political and historical reasons.

== Comparisons ==
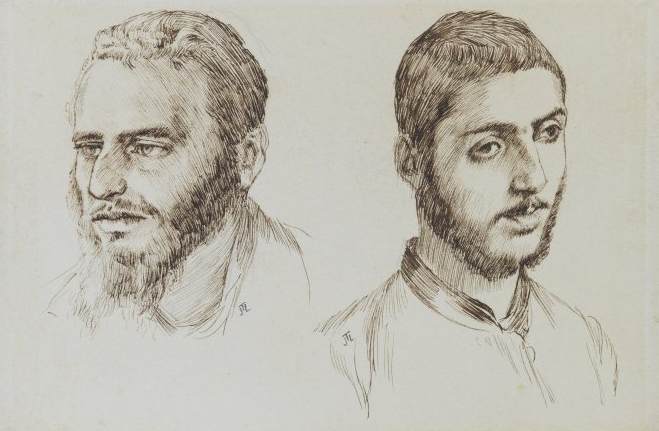
Jew and Armenian by James Tissot, 1880s, Brooklyn Museum

The Armenians and the Jews have often been compared in both academic and non-academic literature since at least the early 20th century, often in the context of the Armenian genocide and the Holocaust, which along with the Cambodian genocide and the Rwandan genocide are considered the most notorious genocides of the 20th century. Historians, journalists, political experts have pointed out a number of similarities between the two ethnic groups: the wide dispersion around the world, the relatively small size, the former lack of statehood, the fact that both countries are largely surrounded by Muslim and mainly hostile countries, their influential lobby in the United States, their success in business and as model minorities, and even their success in chess.

Charles William Wilson wrote in the 11th edition of Encyclopædia Britannica (1911):

The Armenians are essentially an Oriental people, possessing, like the Jews, whom they resemble in their exclusiveness and widespread dispersion, a remarkable tenacity of race and faculty of adaptation to circumstances.

During her visit to Armenia in 2012, the Israeli Minister of Agriculture Orit Noked stated, "We are like each other with our history, character, with our small number of population and having communities abroad−." Nadav Tamir wrote that the "shared destiny of Jews and Armenians should have turned Israel and Armenia into allies, but the state of Israel has chosen a different path."

== History ==
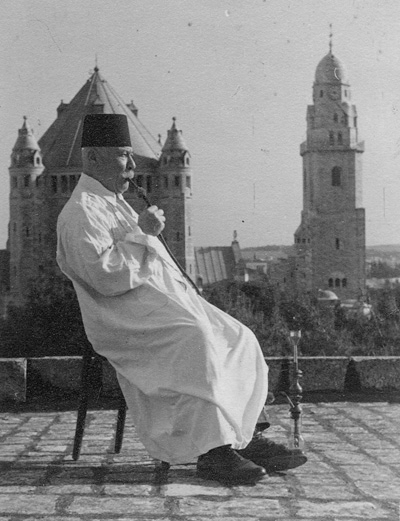
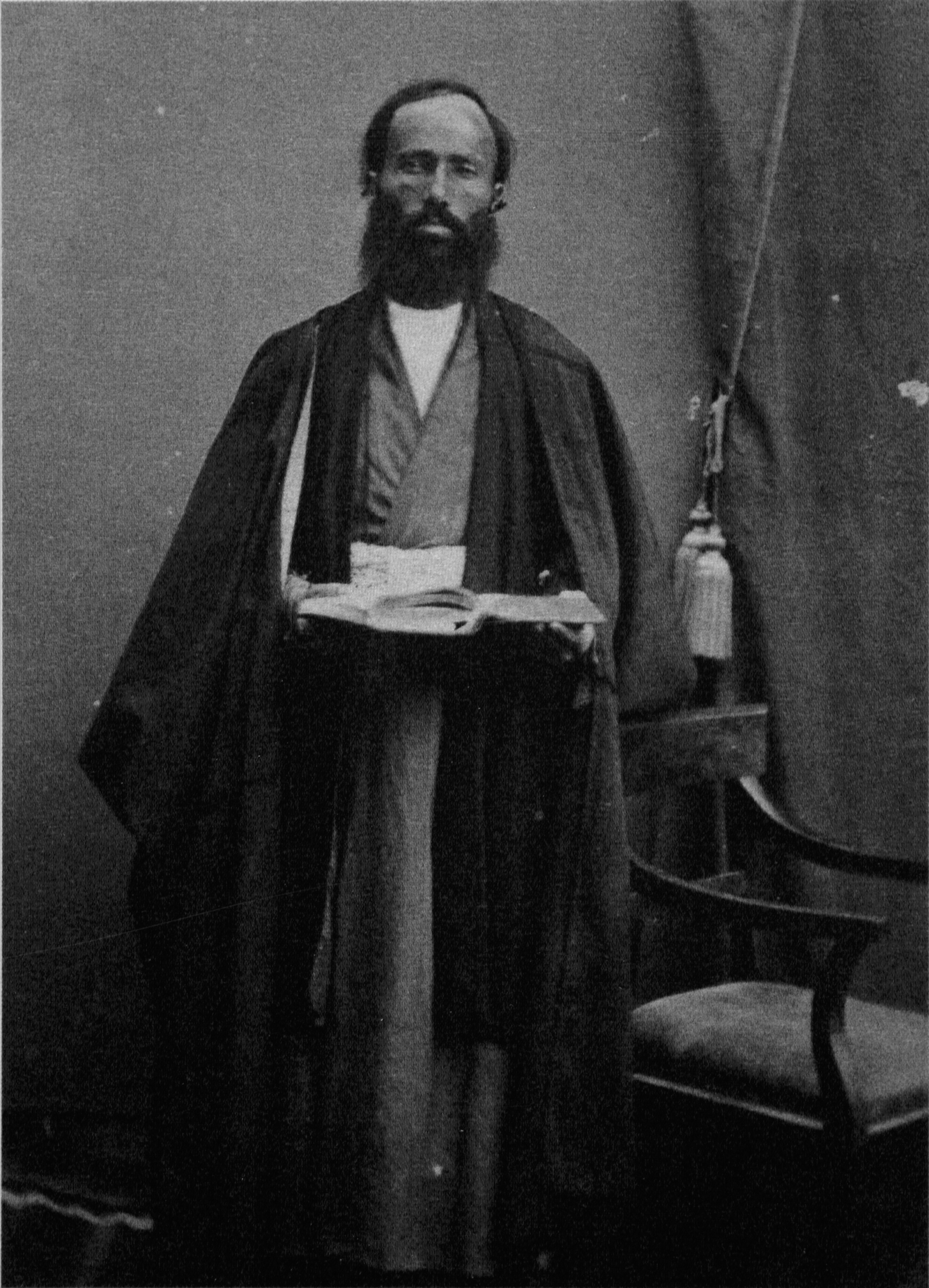
An Armenian priest in Jerusalem (left) and a Jew in Armenia circa 1900 (right).

The first contacts between the Armenians and the Jews date back to the antiquity. Tigranes the Great, under whom Armenia reached its greatest extent, settled thousands of Jews into Armenia in 1st century BC. Today, there is only a small, mostly Russified Jewish community of 800 in Armenia still remaining.

Armenians have had a presence in Israel for centuries. The Armenian Patriarchate of Jerusalem was founded in 638. It is located in the Armenian Quarter, the smallest of the four quarters of the Old City of Jerusalem. According to a 2006 study, 790 Armenians live in the Old City alone.

One of the earliest mentions of the Armenians and the Jews is in the 1723 book Travels Through Europe, Asia, and Into Parts of Africa by French traveler Aubry de La Motraye, where the author writes that the Armenians and Jews are "reckon'd more honest" compared to the Greeks in the Ottoman Empire.

Israel supported Azerbaijan in the first Nagorno-Karabakh War against Armenia in the early 1990s. According to the Journal of Turkish Weekly, "Turkey's and Israel's good relations with Georgia and Azerbaijan cause conspiracy theories in Yerevan, and the radical Armenians argue that the Jews play the main role in this 'anti-Armenian great strategy'." Israel has also provided considerable support in weapons and ammunitions to Azerbaijan during the second Nagrono-Karabakh War, reportedly this is done in exchange for Azerbaijani energy and access to Iran. Israel's arms sales to Azerbaijan has been criticised both in Armenia and Israel and has strained the relations between the 2 countries.

In 2004, a private TV company named ALM owned by Tigran Karapetyan has "used the platform to air views that portrayed Jews as an unsavory race bent on dominating Armenia and the wider world." In 2005, Armen Avetisyan, the leader of a small radical nationalist party, Armenian Aryan Union, was arrested on charges of inciting ethnic hatred. The Holocaust memorial in a Yerevan park was vandalized in 2004.

Nourhan Manougian, the Armenian Patriarch of Jerusalem, stated that Armenians are treated as "third-class citizens". An increasing number of hateful incidents towards the Armenian patriarchate, its priests and Armenian businesses occurred in 2023, while a general rise in the number of attacks on Christians in Jerusalem by Jews was observed. The Armenian Patriarchate of Jerusalem and the Greek Orthodox Church condemned an attack at a holy site in the Armenian-Greek church of St. Mary, deploring inadequate action from law-enforcement and lack of condemnation that has led to further increase of attacks.

== Antisemitism in Armenia ==
According to the ADL's 2014 survey, around 58 percent of Armenians expressed antisemitic tendencies and prejudices, while 80 percent of Armenians stated that they have not met a Jewish person.

The president of the Jewish Community in Armenia, Rima Varzhapetyan-Feller, has stated on January 23, 2015, that "The Jewish community feels itself protected in Armenia, and the authorities respect their rights, culture, and traditions. There is no anti-Semitism in Armenia, and we enjoy good relations with the Armenians. Of course, the community has certain problems that originate from the general situation of the country."

According to the 2022 Country Report on Human Rights Practices published by US Department of State "Observers estimated the country’s Jewish population at between 500 and 1,000 persons. Members of the Jewish community reported a notable improvement during the year and decrease of antisemitism compared with the previous year, when, following the intensive fighting with Azerbaijan in the fall of 2020, antisemitic sentiments in society increased, reportedly due to Azerbaijani use of Israeli-produced weapons. A representative of the Jewish community reported that the hundreds of Jews who had arrived from Russia since February reported only positive experiences in the country."

== Jewish/Israeli position on the Armenian genocide ==
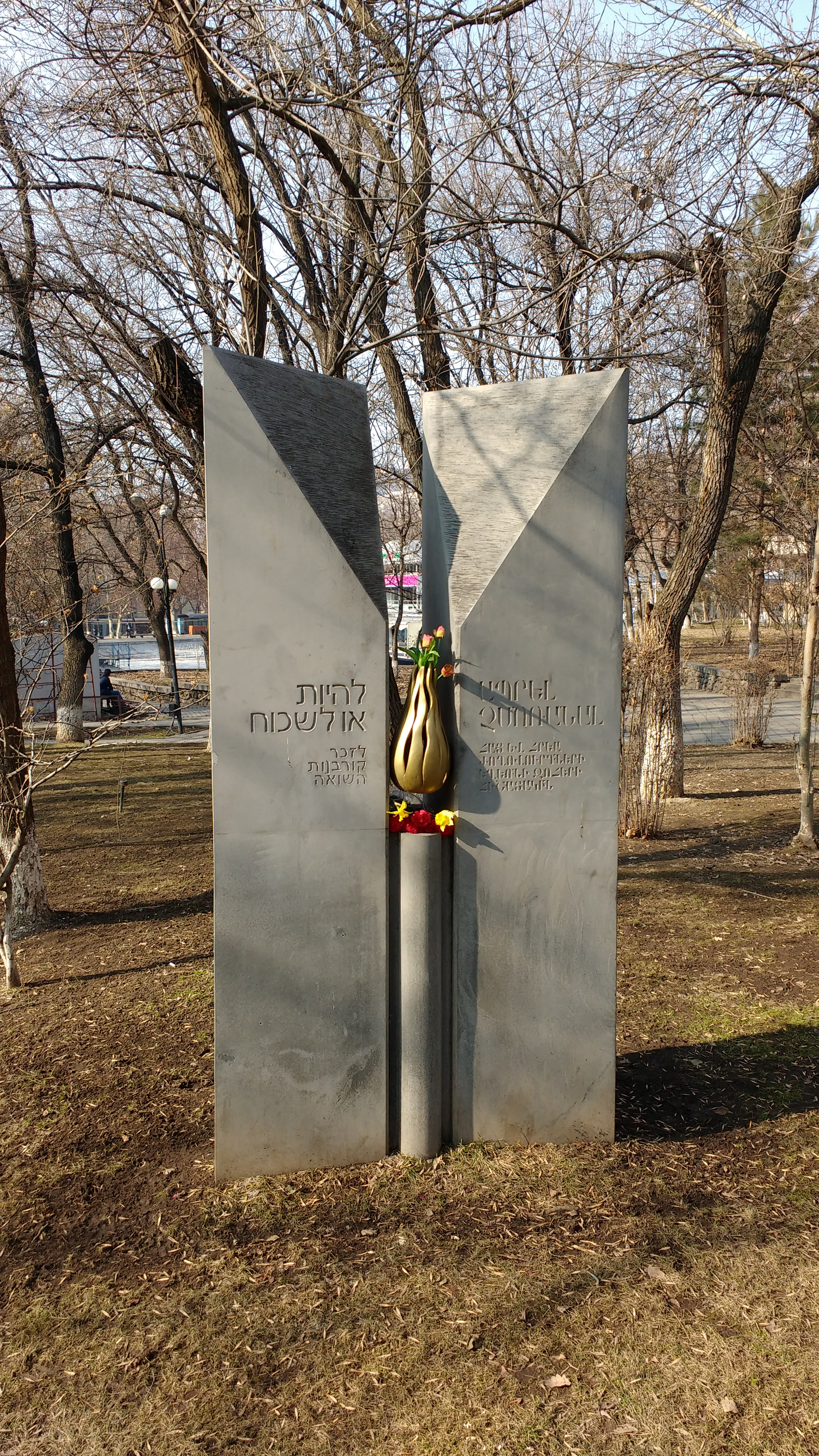
Jewish Holocaust Memorial in Yerevan

Ambassador Morgenthau's Story (1918), one of the major primary sources discussing the Armenian genocide, was written by Henry Morgenthau, Sr., an American Jew. Similarly, The Forty Days of Musa Dagh (1933), one of the best-known novels about the genocide, was written by Franz Werfel, an Austrian Jew. Raphael Lemkin, a Polish Jewish lawyer, coined the concept of genocide as a crime against humanity, basing it on the Armenian experience.

There has been a controversy around the recognition of the Armenian genocide by Israel. It is suggested by Yair Auron that Israel doesn't want to hurt its relations with Turkey and wants to retain the "uniqueness" of the Holocaust.

In 2001, Israeli Foreign Minister Shimon Peres described the Armenian genocide as "meaningless". In response, historian and genocide expert Israel Charny accused Peres of going "beyond a moral boundary that no Jew should allow himself to trespass." In his letter to Peres, Charny stated:

It seems that because of your wishes to advance very important relations with Turkey, you have been prepared to circumvent the subject of the Armenian genocide in 1915–1920 ... it may be that in your broad perspective of the needs of the state of Israel, it is your obligation to circumvent and desist from bringing up the subject with Turkey, but, as a Jew and an Israeli, I am ashamed of the extent to which you have now entered into the range of actual denial of the Armenian genocide, comparable to denials of the Holocaust.

In 2008, Yosef Shagal, former Israeli parliamentarian from right wing Yisrael Beiteinu in an interview to Azerbaijan media stated: "I find it is deeply offensive, and even blasphemous to compare the Holocaust of European Jewry during the Second World War with the mass extermination of the Armenian people during the First World War. Jews were killed because they were Jews, but Armenians provoked Turkey and should blame themselves."

The Knesset failed to vote for the Armenian genocide bill in 2011. Knesset Speaker Reuven Rivlin, among its supporters, stated "It is my duty as a Jew and Israeli to recognize the tragedies of other peoples."

After some previous opposition, Jewish lobby groups in the United States have joined in the call for recognition of the Armenian genocide by the U.S. government. Grassroots activism by Jewish Americans was influential regarding this issue. In 2014, the prominent American Jewish Committee paid tribute to the memories of the victims of the genocide of Armenians. The AJC called on the government of Turkey to not only provide full access to the historical record of that dark period but also to address the realities the records reveal. In 2015, the Jewish Council for Public Affairs adopted a resolution on Armenian genocide that calls on the U.S. Congress and U.S. president to recognize the Armenian genocide.

As of 2026 Israel has officially recognised the Armenian genocide at cost to its own position in the region.

== Notable people of mixed Armenian-Jewish descent ==
- Levon Aronian (a Jewish father, an Armenian mother), Armenian chess grandmaster
- Yelena Bonner (an Armenian father, a Jewish mother), Soviet and Russian human rights activist
- Sergei Dovlatov (a half-Jewish father, an Armenian mother), Soviet journalist and writer
- Garry Kasparov (a Jewish father, an Armenian mother), Soviet and Russian chess grandmaster, considered by many the greatest chess player
- Yevgeny Petrosyan (an Armenian father, a Jewish mother), Russian comedian
- Aram Saroyan (an Armenian father, a Jewish mother), American poet (son of William Saroyan and Carol Grace)
- Richard Shepard (a Jewish father, an Armenian mother), American film and television director
- Jackie Speier (a Jewish father, an Armenian mother), US Congresswoman from California
- Michael Vartan (an Armenian, Bulgarian, and Hungarian father, a Jewish mother), French-American film and television actor
- Zurab Zhvania (a Georgian father, a mixed Jewish-Armenian mother), Georgian politician
- Michael Artin (a half-Armenian father and a half-Jewish mother), American mathematician
- Joe Strummer (an Armenian great-grandfather and a German-Jewish great-grandmother), British musician
- Armen Weitzman (of Armenian and European Jewish descent), American actor
- Maxine Cassin, American poet
- Peter Gabel (a half-Armenian mother, a Jewish father; son of Arlene Francis and Martin Gabel), law academic, editor of Tikkun magazine
- Artem Oganov, Russian theoretical crystallographer

== Notable Armenian-Jewish marriages ==
- Dolores Zohrab (Armenian) and Henry L. Liebmann (Jewish)
- William Saroyan (Armenian) and Carol Grace (Jewish)
- Tigran Petrosian (Armenian) and Rona Yakovlevna Avinezer (Jewish)
- Mikhail Botvinnik (Jewish) and Gayane Davidovna Ananova (Armenian)
- Levon Ter-Petrosyan (Armenian) and Lyudmila Ter-Petrosyan (Jewish)
- Ruben Vardanyan (Armenian) and Veronika Zonabend (Jewish)
- Emil Artin (an Armenian father) and Natalie "Natascha" Naumovna Jasny (a Jewish father)
- Garik Martirosyan (Armenian) and Zhanna Levina (Jewish)
- Leonid Khachiyan (Armenian) and Olga Pischikova Reynberg (Jewish)
- Abram Alikhanov and Slava Solomonovna Roshal (Jewish)

== See also ==
- Armenia–Israel relations
- Armenian–Kurdish relations

== Works ==
=== Books ===
- (in French) Turabian, Aram. La France: les Arméniens et les juifs [English: The Armenians and the Jews]. 1938
- Mazian, Florence (1990). Why Genocide?: The Armenian and Jewish Experiences in Perspective. Ames: Iowa State University Press. ISBN 978-0-8138-0143-8.
- Varzhapetyan, Vardvan (1995). Армяне и евреи: цифры, даты, имена [Armenians and Jews: numbers, dates, names] (in Russian). Yerevan: NOY. ISBN 9785727000137.
- Melson, Robert (1996). Revolution and Genocide: On the Origins of the Armenian Genocide and the Holocaust. Chicago: University of Chicago Press. ISBN 978-0-226-51991-3.
- Hovannisian, Richard G.; Myers, David N. (1999). Enlightenment and Diaspora: The Armenian and Jewish Cases. Atlanta: Scholars Press. ISBN 978-0-7885-0604-8.
- Auron, Yair (2000). The Banality of Indifference: Zionism and the Armenian Genocide. New Brunswick, New Jersey: Transaction Publishers. ISBN 978-1-4128-4468-0.
- Kieser, Hans-Lukas; Schaller, Dominik J. (2002). Der Völkermord an den Armeniern und die Shoah [The Armenian Genocide and the Shoah]. Zürich: Chronos Verlag. ISBN 978-3-0340-0561-6.
- Laçiner, Sedat; Kaya, İbrahim (2003). The Armenian Issue and the Jews. Ankara: Ankara University Publishing House. ISBN 978-975-92445-3-8.
- Mandel, Maud S. (2003). In the Aftermath of Genocide: Armenians and Jews in Twentieth-Century France. Durham, North Carolina: Duke University Press. ISBN 978-0-8223-3121-6.
- Güçlü, Yücel (2012). The Holocaust and the Armenian Case in Comparative Perspective. Lanham, Md.: University Press of America. ISBN 978-0-7618-5782-2.

=== Articles ===
- (in German) Sofer, Leo: Armenier und Juden. Zeitschrift für Demographie und Statistik der Juden, Jg 3 (1907) Nr 5, S. 65–69.
- (in German) Weissenberg, Samuel. "Armenier und Juden". Sonderabdruck aus dem Archiv für Anthropologie Braunschweig 13, no. 4 (1914), 383–387.
- Nadel-Golobič, Eleonora. "Armenians and Jews in Medieval Lvov. Their Role in Oriental Trade 1400–1600", Cahiers du Monde russe et soviétique, Vol. 20, No. 3/4 (Jul. - Dec., 1979), pp. 345–388, École des hautes études en sciences sociales, Paris
- Charny, Israel W. "The Turks, Armenians and Jews". The Book of the International Conference on the Holocaust and Genocide: Book One. The Conference Program and Crisis. 1983.
- Dekmejian, R. Hrair. "Determinants of genocide: Armenians and Jews as case studies". The Armenian Genocide in Perspective (1986): 92–94.
- Dadrian, Vahakn N. "The Convergent Aspects of the Armenian and Jewish Cases of Genocide. A Reinterpretation of the Concept of Holocaust". Holocaust and Genocide Studies 3.2 (1988): 151–169
- (in German) Heinsohn, G. "Armenier und Juden als Testfall für die Streichung von drei Jahrhunderten durch Heribert Illig" Ethik und Sozialwissenschaften: Streitforum für Erwägungskultur (EuS) 8.4 (1997): 490.
- (in French) Cohen, Raya. "Le génocide arménien dans la mémoire collective juive". Les cahiers du judaïsme 3 (1998): 113–122.
- Dadrian, Vahakn N. "The Historical and Legal Interconnections between the Armenian Genocide and the Jewish Holocaust: From Impunity to Retributive Justice". The Yale Journal of International Law 23 (1998): 503
- Schmidinger, Thomas (2005). ""Der Armenier ist wie der Jude, außerhalb seiner Heimat ein Parasit" Zum Genozid an der armenischen Bevölkerung des Osmanischen Reiches" (PDF) (in German). University of Vienna.
- Marutyan, Harutyun (2011). "Հայոց ցեղասպանության և հրեաների Հոլոքոստի հիշողության կառուցվածքային առանձնահատկությունները [The structural features of the memory of the Jewish Holocaust and the Armenian Genocide]". Patma-Banasirakan Handes (in Armenian) (2). Yerevan: Armenian National Academy of Sciences: 24–46. ISSN 0135-0536.
- Taub, Ryan. "Diasporic Identity in Armenian American and Jewish American Literatures". University of Florida. Archived from the original on 2015-09-24.

=== Other ===
- Ben-Rafael, Eliezer (2009). "A Special Double Session: Homeland and hostland: Armenians and Jews compared" (PDF). Uppsala, Sweden: Swedish Collegium for Advanced Study in the Social Sciences.
- Ben-Rafael, Eliezer (11–14 June 2009). "Hostland and Homeland: Armenians and Jews Compared" (PDF). Yerevan: International Institute of Sociology.
