= Armenian genocide and the Holocaust =

Comparison of genocides

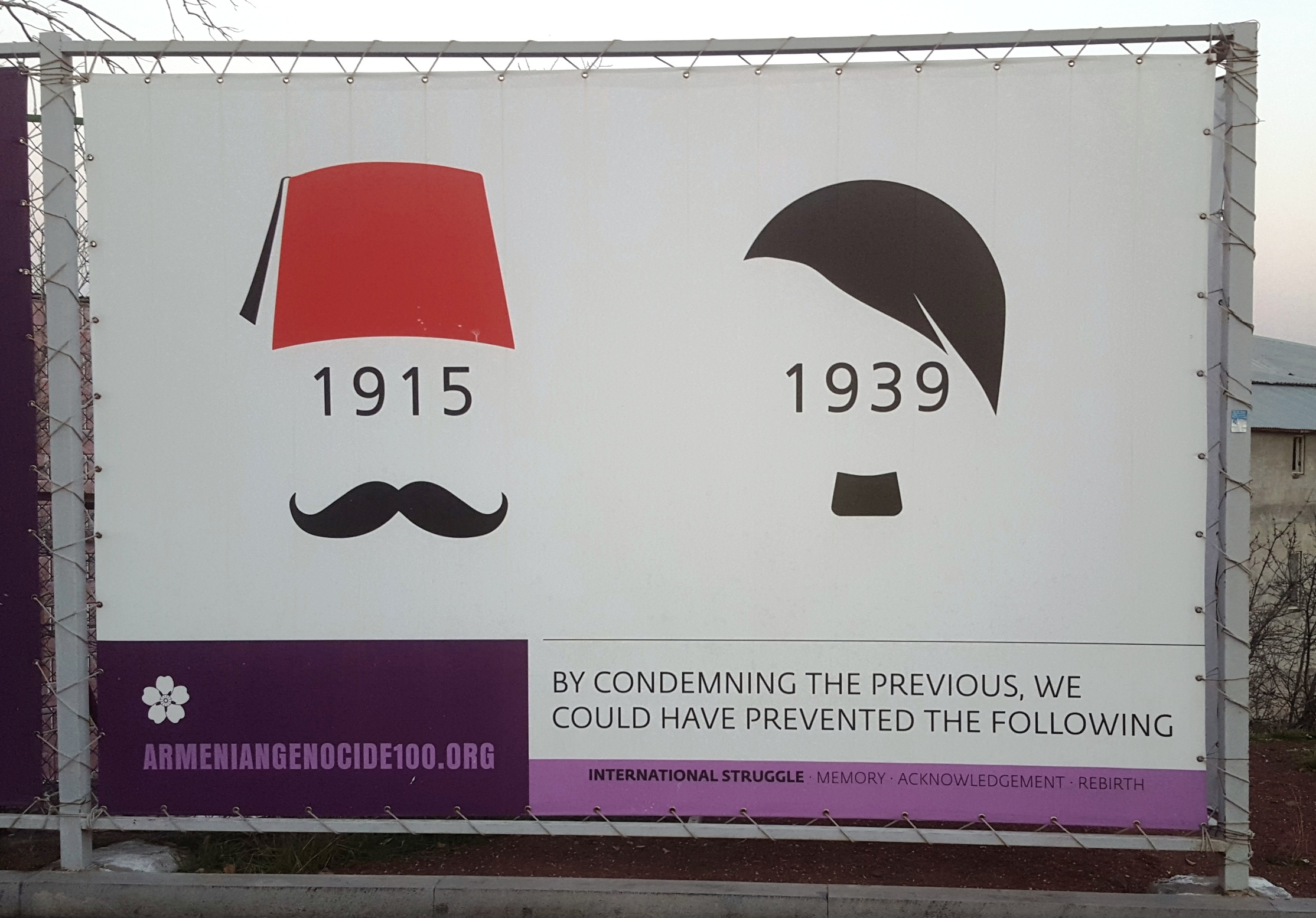
Poster in Yerevan put up during the commemoration of the 100th anniversary of the Armenian genocide in 2015, arguing that the Holocaust could have been prevented by condemnation of the Armenian genocide

The relationship between the Armenian genocide and the Holocaust has been discussed by scholars. Although there is some disagreement, the majority of scholars believe that there is a direct causal relationship between the two genocides.

The Holocaust and the Armenian genocide are both considered paradigmatic cases of genocide in the twentieth century. More generally, scholars have suggested that the perpetrators of the Holocaust were inspired by the Ottoman example and the legacy of impunity, as manifested in Hitler's reference to the Armenian genocide in a 1939 speech: "Who, after all, speaks today of the annihilation of the Armenians?"

== Terminology ==
Early uses of term "holocaust" in modern times were applied to describe the Hamidian massacres and the Armenian genocide. For example, Winston Churchill used the term to describe the Armenian genocide prior to the beginning of World War II. The term later became associated with Nazi genocide of Jews, and it became known in English as the Holocaust.

Raphael Lemkin, who coined the term genocide to describe this category of state crime, began his study of genocides in 1921, after he read accounts of the trial of Soghomon Tehlirian, the assassin of Talaat Pasha, one of the organizers of the Armenian genocide. When he created the term in 1943 or 1944, he specifically cited the Armenian genocide as a seminal example of genocide.

== History ==
=== Background ===
The Armenian Genocide was the “first non-colonial genocide of the twentieth century”. It happened during World War I, and it was carried out by the Committee of Union and Progress; CUP, which included the Ottoman Empire and the Republic of Turkey. After the CUP experienced military defeats, in the Balkan Wars, against the Armenian army. Early in World War I, the Ottoman Empire invaded much of South-Eastern Europe, the Special organization massacred many thousands of the people of Armenia. The Ottoman paramilitaries committed the massacres because of the isolated acts of resistance which were committed by some Armenians, the Ottoman paramilitaries believed that these acts of resistance were the precursor to a mass revolution and they also feared that the Armenians would attempt to claim independence. Initially, the “Young Turk regime rounded up hundreds of Armenians and hanged them in the streets of Istanbul.” (Armenian Genocide). The deportation and mass murdering of around one million Armenians happened while en route of the death marches to the Syrian Desert.

The Holocaust was the genocide of approximately six million Jews by the National Socialist Party's Nazi regime, it occurred under Adolf Hitler and the National Socialist Party, between 1941 and 1945. The targeting of the Jewish community was due to the economic and political crisis that arose after Germany lost World War I (Intro to the Holocaust). The mass murder did not occur immediately after the Nazis came to power, however, the amount of anti-semitic laws that were implemented, like the Nuremberg Laws ensured that the Jewish people were discriminated against and pushed out of ordinary German life. Between 1941 and 1945, Germany and its allied territories committed the mass murder of Jewish people, along with other groups including homosexuals, academics, Roma and Socialists. The most common method of killing was gassing, although there were others including shooting. The genocide was known as the Final Solution to the Jewish Question.

=== Causality ===
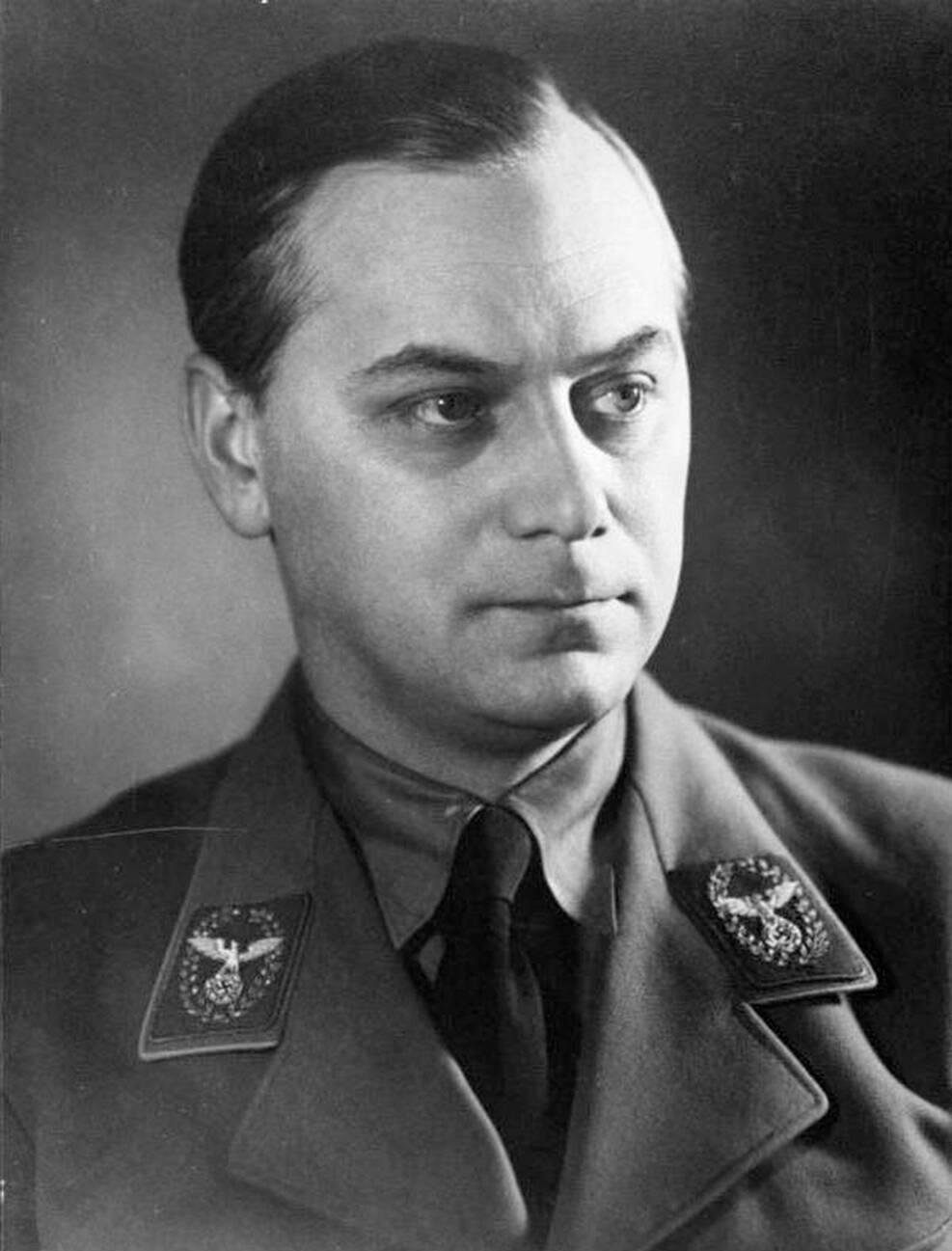
Alfred Rosenberg, the main theorist of Nazism, who defended Taalat Pasha and the Armenian genocide in a press article

Historian Francis Nicosia writes that the Armenian genocide and the Holocaust are the two most-compared genocides in the twentieth century. For historian Robert Melson, "The Armenian Genocide and the Holocaust are the quintessential instances of total genocide in the twentieth century."

According to historians Dominik J. Schaller and Jürgen Zimmerer, it is widely believed that there is a causal relationship between the Armenian genocide and the Holocaust. In the 1920s, there was "a great genocide debate" in the German press which resulted in many German nationalists deciding that genocide was justified as a tactic. In his book Justifying Genocide (2016), Stefan Ihrig writes that there is "no smoking gun" to prove that the Armenian genocide inspired the Holocaust. However, based on various pieces of evidence, he says that the Nazis were well aware of the previous genocide and, to a certain extent, they were also inspired by it. Reviewing Ihrig's book, Armenian historian Vahagn Avedian is convinced that "there are simply too many factors which connect these two cases together".

Omer Bartov, Eldad Ben Aharon and Tessa Hofmann all believe that at least to some extent, the Nazis were inspired by the Armenian genocide.

During Hitler's Obersalzberg Speech, he was quoted as saying:

I have placed my death-head formation in readiness – for the present only in the East – with orders to them to send to death mercilessly and without compassion, men, women, and children of Polish derivation and language. Only thus shall we gain the living space (Lebensraum) which we need. Who, after all, speaks today of the annihilation of the Armenians?

Although this version of the speech is disputed, it is almost certain that Hitler knew about the Armenian genocide since he was an avid newspaper reader and the genocide was covered widely in the press.

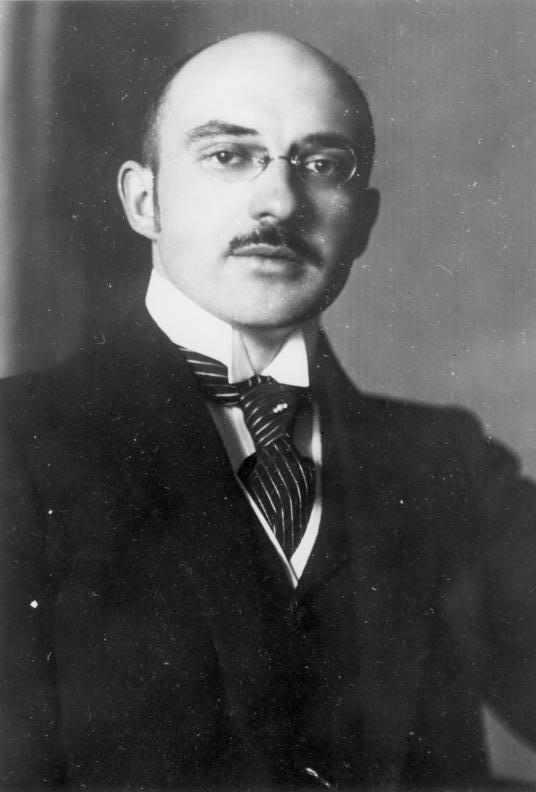
Max Erwin von Scheubner-Richter, a close friend of Adolf Hitler who was also the German vice-consul of Erzurum at the time of the Armenian genocide

According to Hannibal Travis, "Chamberlain, Hess, Rosenberg, Seeckt, Scheubner-Richter, and von Papen all likely played a role in prompting Hitler to use Turkey's example as a model for Poland."

According to Vahakn Dadrian, David Matas and Yair Auron, the perpetrators of the Holocaust were emboldened by the failure to punish the perpetrators of the Armenian genocide. According to international law scholar M. Cherif Bassiouni, the decision not to prosecute Ottoman war criminals slowed the development of international law and made it more difficult to prosecute Nazi war criminals. After World War II the Allies understood the danger of impunity and created the Nuremberg trials.

Historians such as Ihrig and Jersak have emphasized that the Nazis would have concluded that genocide could be camouflaged under the guise of war and would go unpunished. According to Ihrig, "There can be no doubt that the Nazis had incorporated the Armenian genocide, its 'lessons,' tactics, and 'benefits,' into their own worldview and their view of the new racial order they were building."

However, Uğur Ümit Üngör criticized the causality link.

=== Attitudes by contemporaries ===
==== In Germany ====
Several prominent members of the Nazi Party were well aware of the Armenian genocide, such as Alfred Rosenberg, one of the main theorists of Nazism, who tried to minimize the genocide and defend Taalat Pasha or Max Erwin von Scheubner-Richter, to whom the first part of Mein Kampf was dedicated, who was the German vice-consul of Erzurum during the Armenian genocide, and who documented it. According to historian Stefan Ihrig, the Nazis viewed post-1923 Turkey as a post-genocidal paradise and "incorporated the Armenian genocide, its 'lessons', tactics, and 'benefits' into their own worldview."

In 1933, Austrian-Jewish writer Franz Werfel published The Forty Days of Musa Dagh, a book about Armenian resistance at Musa Dagh. The purpose of the book was not just to memorialize the atrocities which were committed against the Armenians, but to warn people about the consequences of racial hatred in general and warn them about the consequences of Nazism in particular. During the Holocaust, many Jews found parallels between their experience and the book. Israeli Holocaust scholar Yehuda Bauer points out that Werfel’s novel “connected the Armenian Genocide with the Holocaust almost physically.”

Many anti-Nazis compared the fate of Jews in Nazi Germany to the genocide of the Armenians. For example, a February 1939 Sopade report by the German resistance stated:

At this moment in Germany the unstoppable extermination of a minority is taking place by way of the brutal means of murder, of torment to the degree of absurdity, of plunder, of assault, and of starvation. What happened to the Armenians during the [world war] in Turkey, is now being committed against the Jews, [but] slower and more systematically.

Richard Lichtheim, one of the German Jews who, as a young leader of the Zionist movement, feverishly negotiated with Ittihadist leaders in wartime Turkey, described the "cold-bloodedly planned extermination of over one million Armenians (kaltblütig durchdacht)" as "akin to Hitler's crusade of destruction against the Jews in the 1940–1942 period".

==== Turkey, the Armenian genocide and The Holocaust ====
According to Tessa Hofmann, Hitler was fascinated by the figure of Mustafa Kemal Atatürk and would have considered the Armenians as the loser nation that "deserved their doom". Hannibal Travis also considered that Hitler "quoted approvingly the role of Kemal Atatürk of Turkey".

Turkey's policy under the leadership of Atatürk until 1938 and İnönü until 1950, remained sympathetic towards Nazi Germany prior to the end of World War II. During the Holocaust, Turkey knowingly prevented Jewish emigrants from finding refuge there, despite several requests from Jewish officials, and openly called for the expulsion of Jewish refugees from Turkey. Furthermore, Turkey requested Nazi authorities to conceal special markings in the passports of Jews fleeing Germany. These markings allowed the Turkish police to identify the Jews, arrest them, and subsequently send them back to Germany.

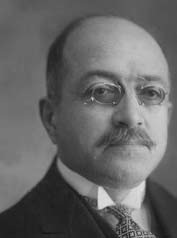
İbrahim Tali Öngören, who organized pogroms in Turkish Thrace

In East Thrace, Kemalist Turkey organized pogroms targeting Jews starting from the 30s, labeling them "bloodsuckers of the Turks" under the leadership of İbrahim Tali Öngören. He stated that:

"The Jew of Thrace is of such moral corruption and such lack of character that it strikes you in the eyes. He is harmful. [...] In the Jewish conception of the world, honor and dignity have no place. [...] The Jews of Thrace are striving to make Thrace identical to Palestine. For the development of Thrace, it is of the utmost necessity not to tolerate this element [the Jews] [...] continuing to suck the blood of the Turks. [The Jews] constitute this secret danger and may perhaps, through their workers' clubs, seek to establish communist nuclei in our country; that is why it is an absolute necessity [...] to finally and in the most radical way solve the [Jewish] problem."

In May 1941, non-Muslim men in Turkey, including Turkish Jews, were conscripted into mandatory work battalions. Also in 1941, İnönü refused to allow the Struma, a Romanian boat with over 770 Jewish refugees, to dock in Turkey, and forcefully sent it back into the sea, where it was subsequently sunk by a Soviet submarine leaving only one survivor, David Stoliar.

Adolf Hitler sent back the remains of Taalat Pasha to Turkey on February 25, 1943, in an official joint act between Nazi Germany and Turkey.

== Comparison ==
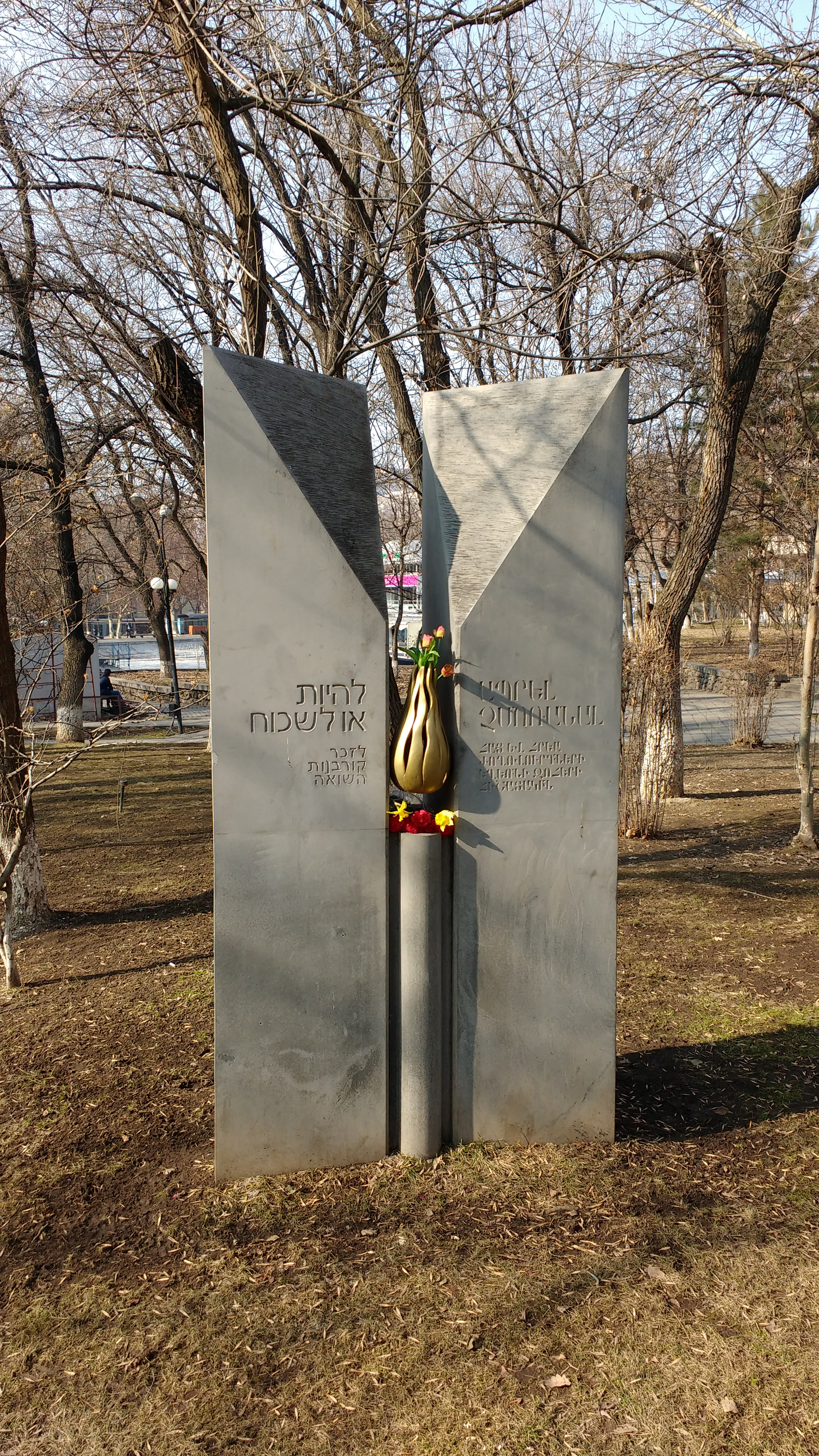
In 2006, a memorial commemorating the Armenian genocide and the Holocaust was erected in Yerevan, Armenia.

According to Israeli historian Yehuda Bauer,

The differences between the Holocaust and the Armenian massacres are less important than the similarities—and even if the Armenian case is not seen as a holocaust in the extreme form which it took towards Jews, it is certainly the nearest thing to it.

There are many similarities between the Armenian genocide and the Holocaust, such as a world war, the attempted destruction of members of an ethnoreligious community which had previously been citizens of the polity, deportation in trains and the role of racism and religious prejudice. Historian Hans-Lukas Kieser states, "In both cases, young imperial elites and would-be saviors of empires had traumatically witnessed the loss of power, prestige, territory, and homes. In an unstable political situation and fearing imperial and personal ruin, they succeeded in establishing a single-party regime that allowed them to implement policies of expulsion and extermination based on crazy, but calculated social Darwinist engineering." Scholar Hannibal Travis notes similarities between the Turkish denial narrative, which accuses Armenians of conspiring with the Russian Empire and United Kingdom against the Ottoman Empire, and the German stab-in-the-back myth; some Turkish secondary school textbooks use the phrase "stab in the back" to describe Armenian treachery. There are also differences: racial antisemitism is not equivalent to the Turkist nationalism that fueled the Armenian genocide, and unlike the Holocaust in which many Jews died in death camps, the methods used for the Armenian genocide were deportation, massacres, and starvation.

In 2010, the President of Armenia, Serzh Sargsyan, stated: "Quite often historians and journalists soundly compare Deir ez Zor with Auschwitz by saying that 'Deir ez Zor is the Auschwitz of the Armenians'. I think that the chronology forces us to formulate the facts in a reverse way: 'Auschwitz is the Deir ez Zor of the Jews'.

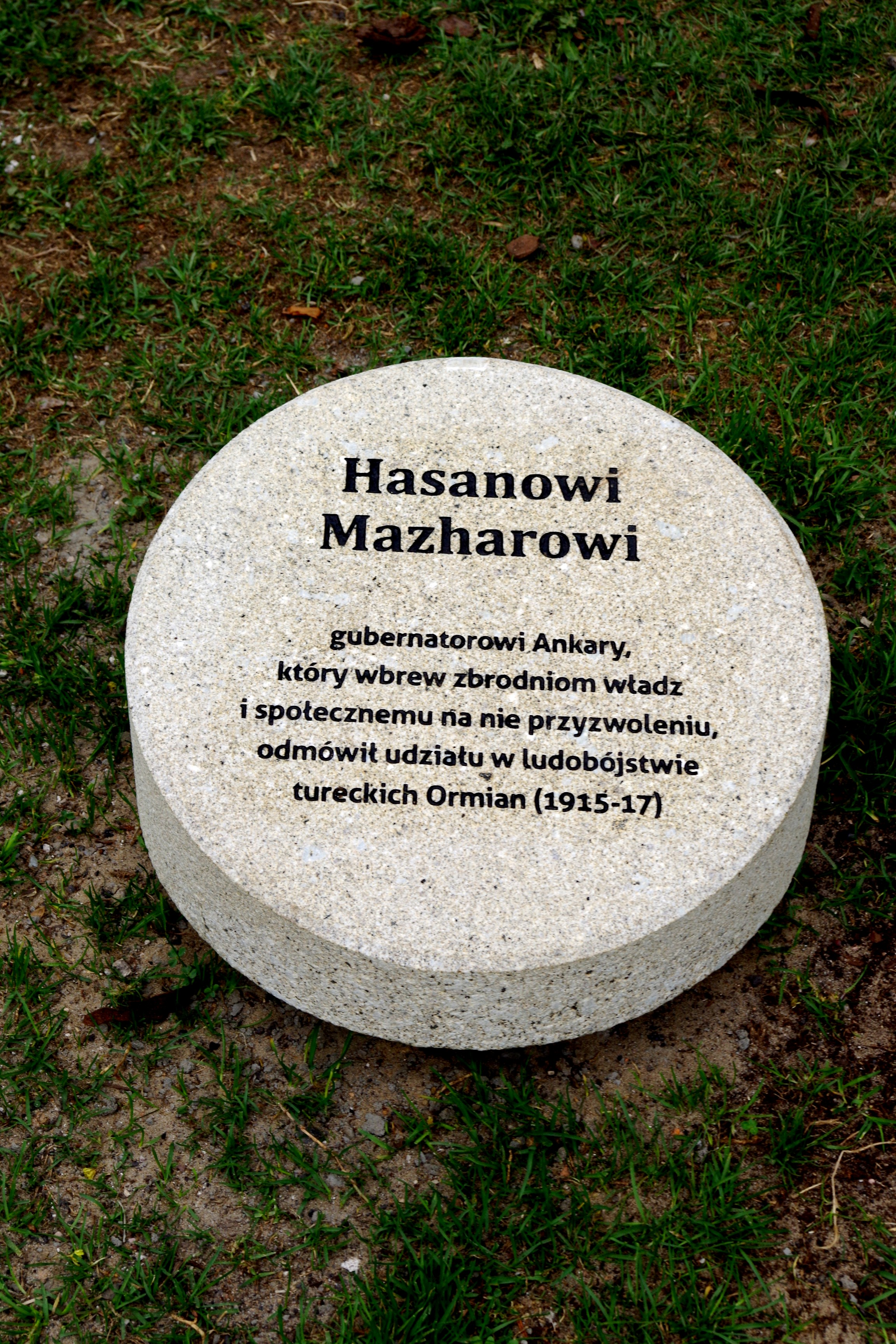
Obelisk commemorating Hasan Mazhar in the Garden of the Righteous in Warsaw

The comparison of the Armenian genocide and the Holocaust is strongly rejected in many works which were written by authors who deny the Armenian genocide, such works try to appeal to a Jewish audience by "emphasizing the uniqueness and absolute difference between, on the one hand, what was indeed a real, horrific genocide and, on the other, what they call the hoax of a politically motivated Armenian claim of genocide", according to historian Richard Hovannisian.

In his comparison of the aftermath of the two cases of genocide, Vahagn Avedian wrote that the Armenian genocide and the Holocaust are intertwined, not only with regard to the impact which they have had on their respective affected nations (perpetrators and victims), they are also intertwined with regard to how memories of them have affected those nations. The Armenian genocide made an evident impact on the perpetrating German elite during World War II and it also made an impact on the legal aftermath of the war, when the United Nations War Crimes Commission cited the Armenian massacres as an example of Crimes Against Humanity in its 1948 report and thereby cited it as a precedent for Article 6 of the Nuremberg Charter', which was the basis for the impending review of the UN's Genocide Convention. In turn, the Holocaust has been present in almost every aspect of the recognition process of the Armenian genocide, the Holocaust has been invoked by both camps, in alignment with the scholarly consensus, advocates of recognition of the Armenian genocide have invoked the Holocaust whenever they have advocated wider political recognition of the Armenian genocide, and deniers of the Armenian genocide have also invoked the Holocaust. The process of the politics of memory of each case has, although quite diametrically, had a significant role in shaping the national identities and narratives of post WWI Turkey and post-WWII Germany, the former nation's national identity and narrative have both been shaped by denial and revisionism and the latter nation's national identity and narrative have both been shaped by its decision to recognize its past wrongdoings as well as the consequences of them.

== Denial ==
While Armenian genocide denial is an official policy of the Turkish state, Germany acknowledged and paid reparations for the Holocaust. Therefore, Holocaust denial is a much more marginal phenomenon.

In Perinçek v. Switzerland (2015), the European Court of Human Rights determined that Armenian genocide denial falls within the right to freedom of speech which is guaranteed by Article 10 of the European Convention on Human Rights, whereas member states are permitted to criminalize Holocaust denial. Law professor Uladzislau Belavusau criticized this decision for "creat[ing] a speculative distinction between the Holocaust and other 20th-century atrocities" that amounted to trivialization of the Armenian genocide.

In October 2020, Facebook banned Holocaust denial, but it continued to allow denial of the Armenian genocide. It did not offer any reason for its different treatment of the two genocides. Former world chess champion Garry Kasparov, himself of mixed Armenian-Jewish ancestry, criticized Facebook founder Mark Zuckerberg after his Facebook page was shut down after posting an interview, which mentioned the Armenian genocide. "So Holocaust denial is now banned on FB, according to Zuckerberg, but those who deny the Armenian Genocide are very welcome on Facebook—and even rewarded by having their targets' pages blocked," said Kasparov. Armenian diaspora and anti-hate groups, such as the AGBU, Anti-Defamation League (ADL), and Genocide Watch, have called on Facebook to ban Armenian genocide denial on its platform.

=== Legal repercussions ===
In 2001, France passed a state law that publicly recognized the Armenian Genocide of 1915. Additionally in 2006 the French legislature drafted a law (Proposition de Loi tendant à réprimer la contestation de l’existence du genocide arménien) that would add on to the previous 2001 law. This new law would make denying the Armenian Genocide a criminal offense. The person who is denying would be “subject to up to one year of imprisonment and or have to pay a fine of €45,000” (France’s Draft Law on the Armenian Genocide:). Additionally, the Entente powers of Great Britain, France, and Russia deemed in May 1915, during World War I "condemned the Ottoman Turkish government's mass killing of its Armenian population in eastern Anatolia by referring to “new crimes… against humanity and civilization."

All around the world, there are many more conversations, laws, and holidays in relation to the Holocaust. The United States declared that the 27th of January is International Holocaust Remembrance Day. After World War II, Germany banned the National Socialist Party (Nazi Party) by deeming it a criminal organization in an attempt to atone for its past actions. Germany also “...criminalized the denial of the holocaust, banned the use of insignia related to Hitler’s regime and all written material and images promoting the Nazi party” (Holocaust Denial Laws and Other Legislation Criminalizing Promotion of Nazism).

In 1946, the International Military Tribunal at Nuremberg, also referred to as the Nuremberg Trials, "24 of the most important military and political leaders of the Third Reich were tried…" Nineteen of the twenty-four were convicted, and three were acquitted. Twelve of the nineteen were sentenced to death, three were sentenced to life in prison and four were sentenced to serve jail time which ranged from ten to twenty years.

== See also ==
- Armenia–Israel relations
- Armenian–Jewish relations
- Genocide studies
- Herero and Nama genocide and the Holocaust
- Libyan genocide and the Holocaust
- The Holocaust and the Nakba
- Holocaust uniqueness debate
- International response to the Holocaust
- Late Ottoman genocides
