= Armenia–Israel relations =

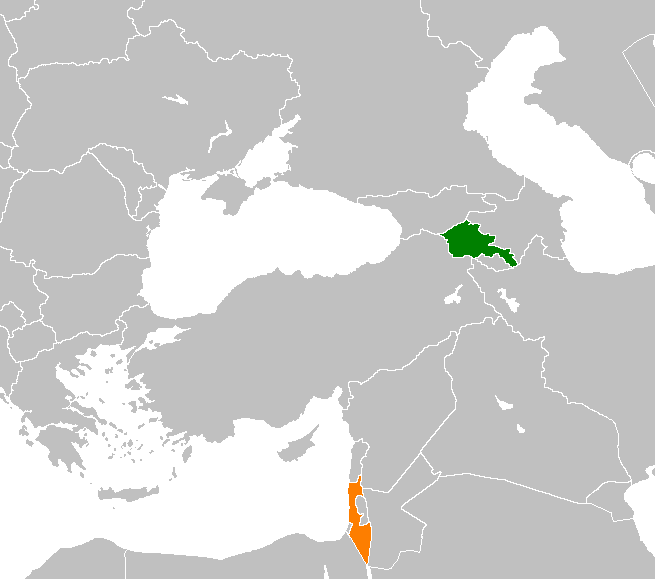

- Armenia: Israel

A bilateral relationship exists between Armenia and Israel. From 1993 to 2007, Armenia was served by the Embassy of Israel in Georgia. In 1996, Tsolak Momjian was appointed the honorary consul of Armenia in Jerusalem. Eleven years later, the residence of the Embassy of Israel in Armenia was moved to Jerusalem. In October 2010, Shmuel Meirom was appointed the Israeli ambassador to Armenia. Armen Melkonian was appointed the Armenian ambassador to Israel in 2012, with a residence in Cairo. In October of that year, Melkonian presented his credentials to Israeli president Shimon Peres. On 21 September 2019 Armenia announced that it would be opening an embassy in Israel. Despite generally cordial ties between the two, relations soured after Armenia withdrew its ambassador to Israel due to Israeli arms supply to Armenia's enemy, Azerbaijan, in the Second Nagorno-Karabakh War.

== Diplomatic relations ==
Israel and Armenia have maintained diplomatic relations since the latter's independence from the Soviet Union in 1991. The Armenian diplomatic mission to Israel was located in Georgia from 1993 to 2007, although Tsolak Momjian was appointed honorary consul of Armenia in Jerusalem in 1996.

There have been several high-level visits to Israel by Armenians. Former Armenian president Robert Kocharyan traveled to Israel and met with high-ranking Israeli officials, including former Israeli prime minister Ehud Barak, in January 2000. Both countries pledged to strengthen relations and signed agreements on health and bilateral investment. In 2003, Catholicos of All Armenians Karekin II visited Ashkenazi Chief Rabbi of Israel Yona Metzger. Metzger accepted Karekin's invitation to visit Armenia in 2005, and his trip included a visit to the Tsitsernakaberd (the Genocide Memorial in Yerevan). At the memorial, he formally recognised the Armenian genocide. In 2014 Shmuel Meirom (Israel's ambassador to Armenia, with a residence in Jerusalem) said that Israel is willing to abolish all visas with Armenia soon, beginning with holders of diplomatic passports.

Warming relations between the two deteriorated in September 2020. In response to continuous Israeli military support for Azerbaijan in the Second Nagorno-Karabakh War, Armenia recalled its ambassador to Israel. The president of Artsakh Republic, Arayik Harutyunyan, accused Israel of complicity in 'genocide.'

In December 2021, Armenia transferred its ambassador to Brazil, Arman Akopian, to Israel. Akopian holds a PhD in Semitic philology and speaks Hebrew and Arabic.

On June 21, 2024, the Israeli Foreign Ministry recalled Akopian for a "stern reprimand conversation" in response to Armenia's decision to acknowledge Palestinian statehood.

High-level visits and meetings
Date	Location	Note
December 1994	Israel	Armenian minister of foreign affairs Vahan Papazian visits.
February 1995	Israel	President Robert Kocharyan of Armenia visits.
October 1998	Israel	Armenian minister of foreign affairs Vardan Oskanian visits.
January 2000	Jerusalem	Armenian president Robert Kocharyan meets with Israeli prime minister Ehud Barak, President Ezer Weizman, Speaker of the Knesset Avraham Burg, Minister of Interior Natan Sharansky, and Mayor of Jerusalem Ehud Olmert.
November 2005	Yerevan	Israel's chief rabbi, Yona Metzger, visits Armenia and declares that the Israeli Jewish community recognizes the Armenian genocide.
August 2011	Yerevan	Israeli diplomats (headed by Foreign Ministry official Pinchas Avivi) and Armenian diplomats (headed by Deputy Foreign Minister Arman Kirakosian) meet to discuss the relationship between their countries.
April 2012	Yerevan	Israeli agriculture minister Orit Noked meets with Armenian prime minister Tigran Sargsyan and Agriculture Minister Sergo Karapetian.
July 2013	Yerevan	Armenian president Serzh Sargsyan meets with Yair Auron, an Israeli historian who specializes in genocide studies.

== Economic relations and tourism ==
Since independence, Armenia has received support from Israel and is one of its trading partners. Armenia Air operates twice weekly flights to Israel and Armenia is looking forward to a rise in tourism from Israel.

== Armenians in Israel ==
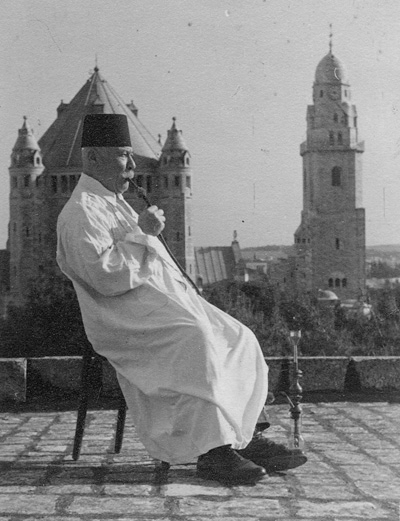
Armenian priest in Israel

The Armenian community has lived in the Levant for about 2,000 years. According to Yoav Loeff (lector of the Armenian language and history at Hebrew University of Jerusalem), the Armenian presence in Jerusalem dates to 301 AD thanks to the Armenian Patriarchate of Jerusalem (which dates back to the Apostolic Age). Tigranes the Great, under whom Armenia reached its greatest extent, deported thousands of Jews to Armenia in the first century BC. Israel is home to the Armenian Quarter of the Old City of Jerusalem. The Armenian Patriarchate of Jerusalem was founded in 638 and is located in the Armenian Quarter, the smallest of the four quarters of the Old City of Jerusalem. According to a 2006 study, 790 Armenians live in the Old City. One of the earliest mentions of Armenians and Jews is in the 1723 book Travels through Europe, Asia, and into parts of Africa by French traveler Aubry de La Motraye, in which de La Motraye writes that the Armenians and Jews are "reckon'd more honest" than the Greeks in the Ottoman Empire.

About 25,000 Armenians lived in Mandatory Palestine by the 1948 Arab–Israeli War, but most fled the area in the ensuing violence. After the establishment of the state of Israel, most of the remaining Armenian community adopted Israeli citizenship and settled in the Old City's Armenian Quarter.

Israel supported Azerbaijan with weapons and ammunition during the First Nagorno-Karabakh War against Armenia in the early 1990s for geopolitical reasons; the perceived threat of the Islamic Republic of Iran was considered. According to the Journal of Turkish Weekly, relations between Israel and Armenia deteriorated because of the conflict; blame was also partly placed on the Jews of Azerbaijan, who circulated conspiracy theories in Armenian society.

In 2009–2011, The Jerusalem Post reported on incidents in which Haredi Yeshiva students spat at Armenian Christians. The Jerusalem district police responded, "All complaints of mutual assault are treated with the utmost severity....more than one case ended with charges being filed and the deportation of clergy involved in assault. As opposed to the situation about three years ago, the frequency of spitting has declined dramatically."

The Armenian Patriarchate of Jerusalem (an independent, self-governing Christian patriarchate dating to the Apostolic Age) Nourhan Manougian said in 2013, "If Israel recognizes the Armenian genocide it won't be the end of the world." He further claimed that Armenians in Jerusalem were being treated as third-class citizens.

== Culture ==
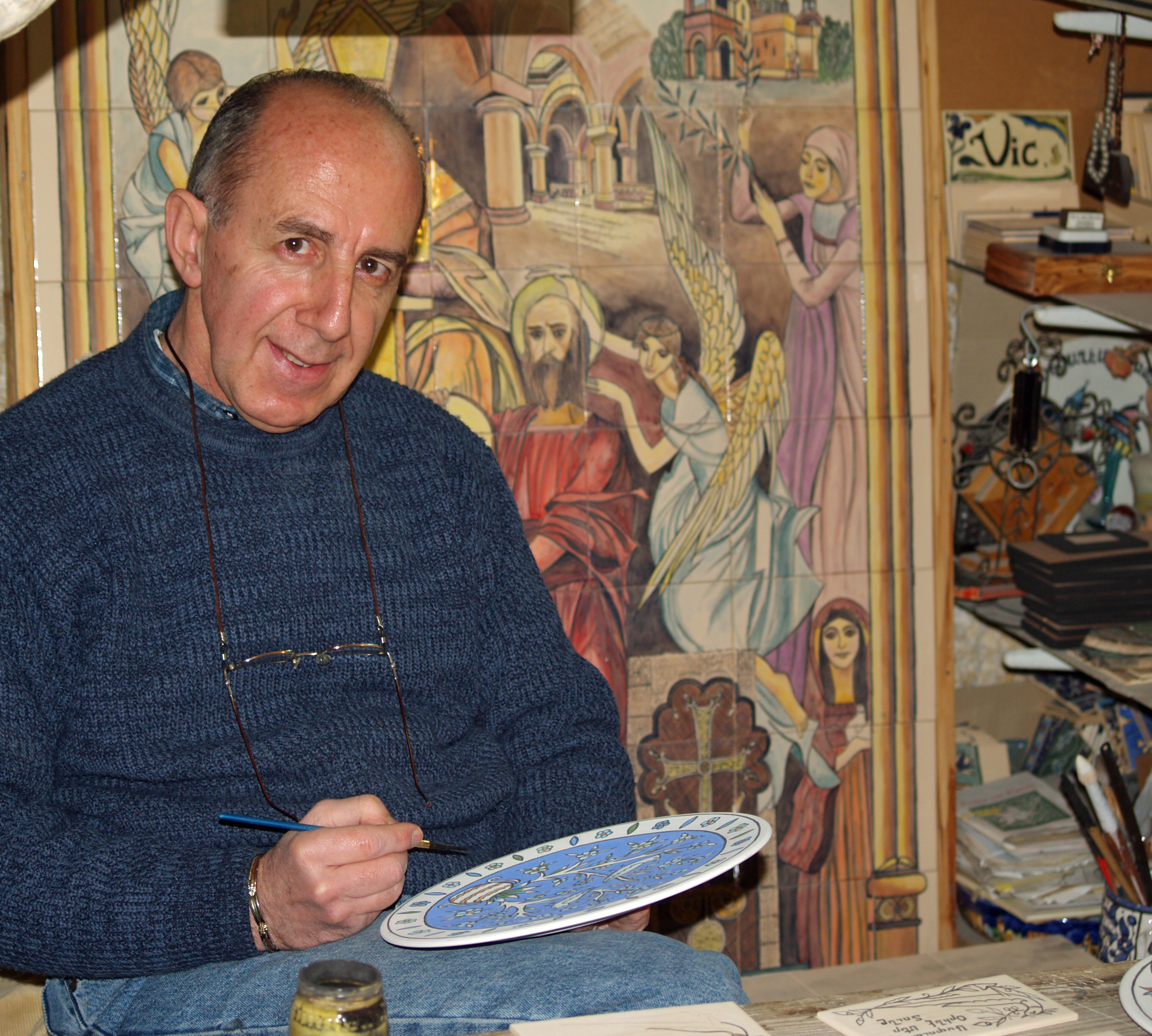
Armenian ceramicist in Jerusalem

Armenian-Israelis are ethnic Armenians with Israeli citizenship. Three thousand Armenians live in Israel, including 1,000 in Jerusalem's Armenian Quarter. About one thousand Armenian-Israelis have Israeli citizenship, mainly in Jerusalem, Tel Aviv and Haifa. The Institute of African and Asian Studies at the Hebrew University established an Armenian-studies programme specialising in study of the Armenian language, literature, history and culture, and the Armenian genocide.

== Armenian Quarter in the Old City of Jerusalem ==
According to the Jewish Virtual Library, "the Armenian Quarter is well preserved. St. James Convent is a complex of several churches with open spaces and gardens covered with a variety of greenery. The Patriarchate building next door is an impressive structure consisting of the Patriarch's residence, gold embossed throne room and several offices. Behind its main gate, the convent contains a priest's quarters, a library building, a museum, printing press, elementary and high schools and residences, youth and social clubs and residential shelters for the poor and employees of the Patriarchate. Currently the Theological Seminary is located outside the convent across the street from the main gate."

Some of Jerusalem's artistic heritage has been influenced by Armenian ceramics and tile-painting.

== Jewish community in Armenia ==
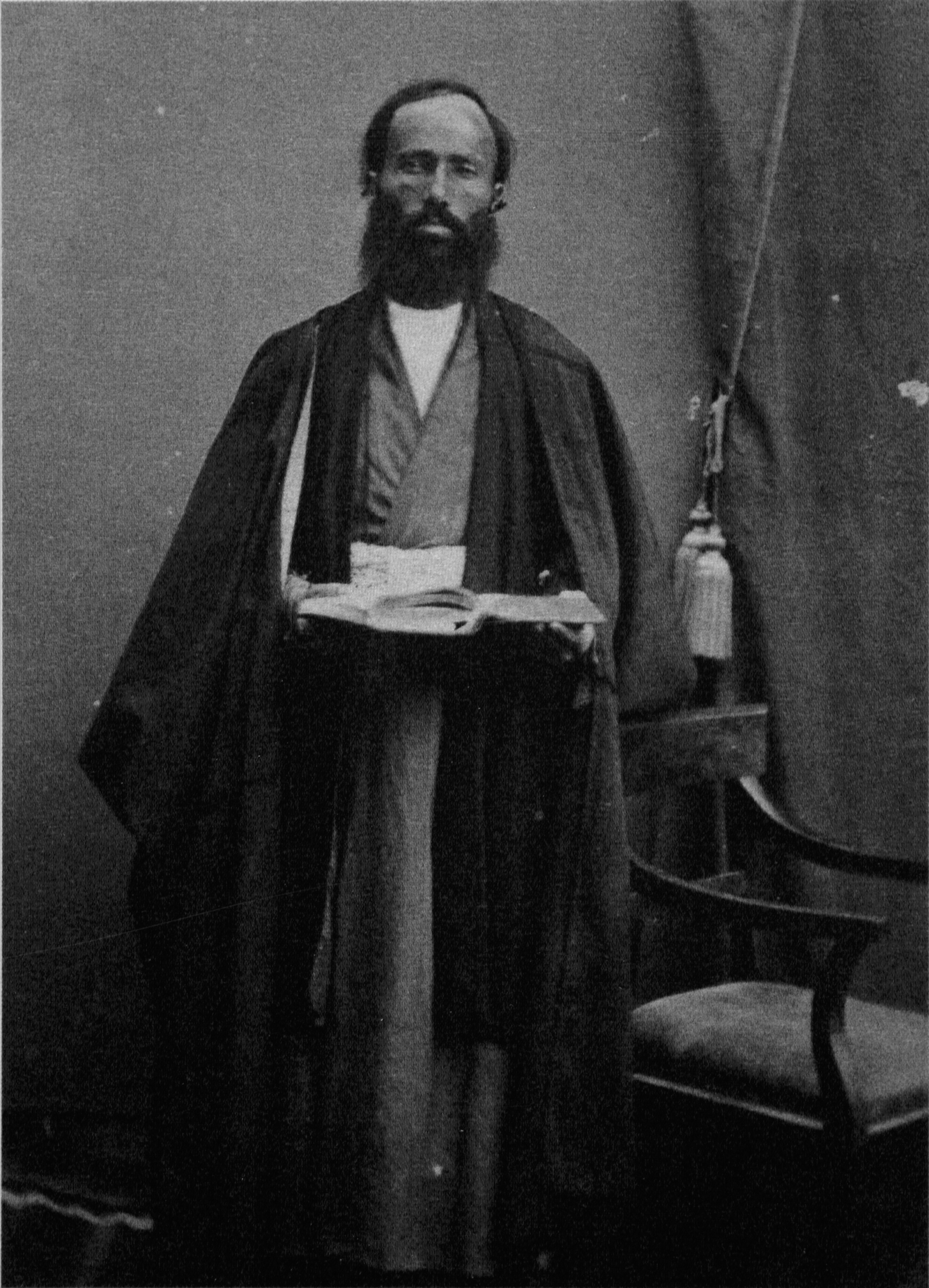
A Jew in Armenia, around 1900

Before the 1996 discovery of a medieval Jewish cemetery, it was believed that there was no Jewish presence in Armenia before modern times. A team of Armenian and Israeli historians and archaeologists excavated the site of the original discovery, and found 64 more graves. It was determined that the Jewish community in Armenia dated back at least to the 13th century. Bishop Mkrtchyan, who first discovered the cemetery, said: "At a time when you can't imagine that a country ... in Europe either helped create or didn't destroy a Jewish settlement. ... It is fantastic how they could gather cultural, architectural symbolism of Jewish Armenians ... and they were connected, and built one of the strongest kingdoms during [the] time of [the] Mongols."

Historians have conjectured that the first Jews arrived in Armenia shortly after the destruction of the first Temple in Jerusalem. They lived (and live) relatively peacefully with the Armenian Christians, with antisemitic incidents being a rarity. Many immigrated to Israel after the establishment of the state of Israel in 1948, and 2002 estimates number the ethnic Jews in Armenia at under 1,000.

A Russified Jewish community of 800 officially remains in Armenia, primarily in Yerevan, in addition to the Subbotniks who live near Sevan. Rimma Varzhapetian-Feller, head of Armenia's Jewish community, has said that she always felt proud of Armenia when she met fellow Jews from other parts of the former Soviet Union: "We always declare everywhere that there has never been antisemitism in Armenia, that Armenia is a good place for Jews to live and, more importantly, that Armenia is quite a stable country in political and social respects". The first instances of antisemitism in Armenia occurred in September 2004 when, for the first time in Armenia's history, the Joint Tragedies Memorial in Yerevan was desecrated.

On 23 October 2004, Armenian Department for Ethnic and Religious Minority Issues head Hranoush Kharatyan accused Israeli leaders of promoting intolerance toward non-Jews in response to an incident where a yeshiva student spat on Archbishop of Jerusalem Nourhan Manougian during a religious procession in the city. The student eventually apologized to the archbishop. During her 2012 visit to Armenia, Israeli Minister of Agriculture Orit Noked said: "We are like each other with our history, character, with our small number of population and having communities abroad."

The Jewish community of Armenia unexpectedly received a surge in population due to the mass exodus of Russians fleeing to Armenia in the wake of the 2022 Russian invasion of Ukraine.

== Armenian genocide recognition ==
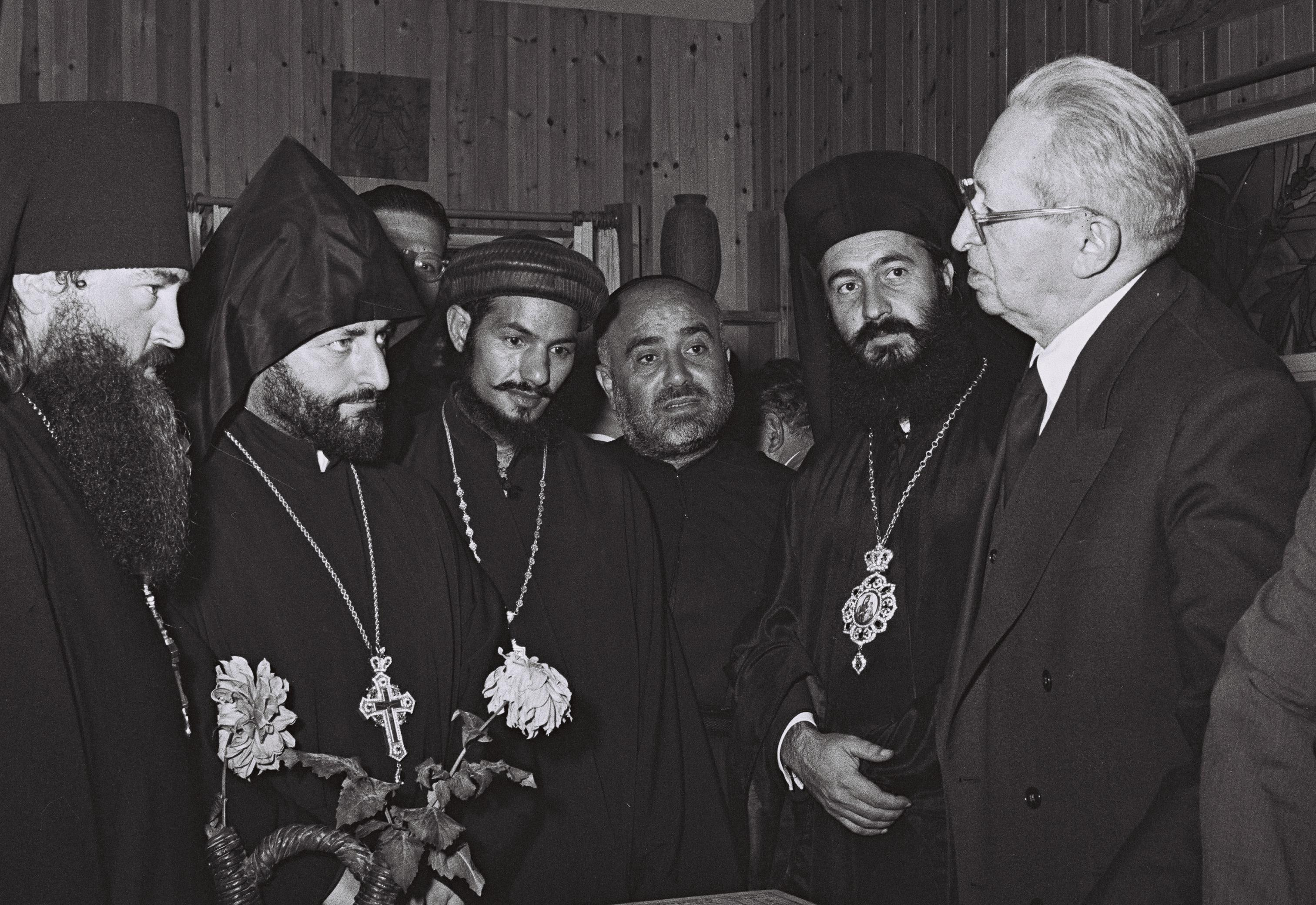
President Yitzhak Ben-Zvi with leaders of the Israeli Greek and Russian Orthodox, Armenian, Coptic and Maronite Churches in 1958

Recognition of the genocide became a subject of debate in Israel in the years following Armenia's 1991 independence from the Soviet Union. Turkey has warned that labeling the events as genocide by Israel or the United States would harm its relations with Israel. In October 2008, the Knesset voted to have a parliamentary committee convene on the Armenian genocide at the urging of Meretz chairman Haim Oron, leading to meetings of the Foreign Affairs and Defense Committees. The government of Turkey continued to lobby to prevent the recognition from going further. According to The Jerusalem Post, "many Israelis are eager for their country to recognize the Genocide". During the summer of 2011, the Knesset held its first discussion on the matter. By a unanimous 20–0 vote, the Israeli parliament approved a public session on the issue by the Education, Culture and Sports Committee at the request of Meretz Knesset member Zahava Gal-On; it stopped short of passing a bill put forward by Gilad Erdan, an Israeli cabinet minister and close ally of Prime Minister Benjamin Netanyahu, for political reasons. Knesset Speaker Reuven Rivlin, one of the bill's supporters, said: "It is my duty as a Jew and Israeli to recognize the tragedies of other peoples." Rivlin told an Israel-based Armenian action committee that he intends to introduce an annual parliamentary session to mark the Armenian genocide.

The Armenian community of Jerusalem believes that the genocide denial is due to fear of jeopardizing diplomatic relations with Turkey. Yair Auron, an Israeli historian, scholar and expert specializing on Holocaust and Genocide studies, said that Israel is concerned about hurting its current trade relations with Turkey and wants to retain the uniqueness of the Holocaust.

In 2001, when he was Israeli foreign minister, Shimon Peres called the Armenian genocide "meaningless." In response, Israel Charny, executive director of the Institute on the Holocaust and Genocide in Jerusalem, wrote: "It seems that because of your wishes to advance very important relations with Turkey, you have been prepared to circumvent the subject of the Armenian genocide in 1915–1920 ... it may be that in your broad perspective of the needs of the state of Israel, it is your obligation to circumvent and desist from bringing up the subject with Turkey, but, as a Jew and an Israeli, I am ashamed of the extent to which you have now entered into the range of actual denial of the Armenian genocide, comparable to denials of the Holocaust."

In 2008, Yosef Shagal, an Azerbaijani-born former Israeli parliamentarian from Yisrael Beiteinu said in an interview with an Azerbaijani news outlet: "I find it is deeply offensive, and even blasphemous to compare the Holocaust of European Jewry during the Second World War with the mass extermination of the Armenian people during the First World War. Jews were killed because they were Jews ... [With Armenians] the picture is principally different - seeking to establish the state and national independence, Turkish Armenians sided with the Russian Empire, which was at war with Turkey".

Israeli president Reuven Rivlin visited the Armenian Patriarchate of Jerusalem on May 9, 2016. Concluding his speech he said, that "the Armenians were massacred in 1915. My parents remember thousands of Armenian migrants finding asylum at the Armenian Church. No one in Israel denies that an entire nation was massacred."

On 1 August 2016, the Knesset Committee on Education, Culture and Sports recognized the Armenian genocide. The committee chairman, Yakov Margi said: "It is our moral obligation to recognize the Holocaust of the Armenian nation."

According to Marc David Baer, Israeli genocide denial has been facilitated by Turkish Jews. He claims that, "promoting themselves as loyal subjects of the sultan, Ottoman Jewish leaders sided with Sultan Abdülhamid II against Armenians, who became their common enemy." Today, the main Jewish leaders in Turkey—chief rabbis David Asseo and Ishak Haleva, and former Jewish community president Bensiyon Pinto—oppose recognition of the Armenian genocide.

=== 2020s ===
On 26 August 2025, Prime Minister Benjamin Netanyahu revealed in a podcast that he personally recognizes the Armenian genocide, the first time the Israeli leader has done so. In the following year, the Israeli government officially recognized the Armenian genocide on 28 June 2026. On 19 July 2026, Haaretz reported that the proposal to recognize the Armenian genocide, approved a month prior, was not brought to a Knesset vote due to pressure from Azerbaijan. According to an Israeli source cited by Haaretz, Benjamin Netanyahu blocked the vote following contact with a senior Azerbaijani adviser.

== Public view of Israel ==
In 2004, a private Armenian television company named ALM, owned by Tigran Karapetyan, used its media platform to broadcast content portraying Jews as an uncivilized race whose aim was to take control of Armenia and the rest of the world. In the same year, the Holocaust memorial established in Yerevan Park was vandalized. In 2005, Armen Avetisyan, the leader of the now defunct Armyano-Arian Order, a radical neo-nazi movement was arrested on charges of inciting hatred against Jews and other minority groups. According to the ADL's 2014 survey, around 58 percent of Armenians expressed antisemitic tendencies and prejudices, while 80 percent of Armenians stated that they have not met a Jewish person.

The opinion of Israel and its recent political developments (relations with Turkey, Azerbaijan, the treatment of Armenians in Israel) has been a dividing factor of Armenians, both in Armenia and in the diaspora. Various Armenians have supported Israel, especially in its ongoing war with Hamas in the Gaza strip, citing historical solidarity with Jewish communities over antisemitism and antisemitic violence. However, many Armenians have likewise taken a pro-Palestine stance, for varying reasons.

Before the war with Hamas, Israel had already been a dividing opinion in Armenian communities due to Israel supplying Azerbaijan with weapons in the 2023 takeover of Karabakh, and Israel staying silent on the idea of recognizing the Armenian Genocide. Many Armenians see parallels in Israel's treatment of Palestinians to Turkish and Azeri treatments of Armenians. At the same time, Israeli settlers increased their attacks against Armenians in Jerusalem due to a controversial land deal with the Armenian quarter, which gave Israeli settlers key land in a 99 year lease.

Due to the increase of Armenia's Jewish community, various Israeli and Azeri media outlets accuse Armenia of being a hotbed of antisemitism in response to Israeli and Azeri treatment of Armenians. Armenian media outlets, however, counter the claim, saying there is very little real antisemitism in Armenia.

In 2024, a neo-nazi march was organized in Yerevan by Hosank, a fringe political group.

== Public view of Armenia ==
The Israeli public opinion on Armenia is divided between geopolitics and ideological view on Armenia. The majority of Israeli society supports the recognition of the Armenian genocide. A survey from 2007 found that 72.4% of the Israelis are in favor of recognition of the Armenian genocide, 43.8% are in favor of recognition even if it means no relations with Turkey, while 35.2% are in favor of recognition as long isn't in the price of cutting relations with Turkey. Since 2010, due to the Gaza flotilla raid and the suspension of relations between Israel and Turkey, public opinion was strengthened in favor of Armenia. A survey from 11 August 2014 which was conducted in 31 countries shows that the percentage of young Israelis (16-29 years old) recognizing the Armenian genocide is the third highest and above the average, as follows: France (93%), Greece (90%), Israel (88%), Croatia, Honduras, Italy, Poland and Switzerland (87%), Spain and Serbia (86%), Austria (85%), Latvia and Russia (84%), Finland and Germany (83%), Average European Union (82%), Belgium, Denmark and Estonia (81%), China (80%), Average (77%), Netherlands (76%), Czech Republic (74%), Romania (72%), Canada (71%), Lithuania (70%), Japan and United Kingdom (68%), Australia (67%), Ukraine (65%), United States (64%), India (51%), and Turkey (33%).

The view on Azerbaijan–Israel relations are mostly geopolitical and economical related as Azerbaijan and Iran are considered hostile to one another almost same as Israel and Iran are in the state of war. Azerbaijan is an energy supplier for Israel as Israel supplies products of arms industry for Azerbaijan. Armenia has strong relations with Iran both geopolitical and economic related, as Azerbaijan and Iran are considered hostile to one another. Some claim Armenia–Iran relations are alarming to Israel the same as some claim Israeli-Azeri relations are alarming to Armenia. Those geopolitical relations viewed as vice versa between the Israeli-Azeri relations to the Armenia-Iran relations.

Despite the Second Nagorno-Karabakh War in 2020, the 2023 Azerbaijani offensive in Nagorno-Karabakh, and the decision of Armenia to recognize the state of Palestine in 2024, many Israelis have favorable opinions towards Armenia. Some Israelis have also put the Israeli-Azeri relations into question.

== Resident diplomatic missions ==
- Armenia has an embassy in Tel Aviv.
- Israel is accredited to Armenia from its embassy in Tbilisi, Georgia and maintains an honorary consulate in Yerevan. Israel has announced plans to open an embassy in Yerevan in the near future.

== See also ==
- Armenia–Palestine relations
- Armenian–Jewish relations
- Armenians in Israel
- Foreign relations of Armenia
- Foreign relations of Israel
- History of the Jews in Armenia
- Israelis in Armenia
