= Israelis in Armenia =

Total population
- 100

Regions with significant populations
- Yerevan

Languages
- Hebrew, Russian, Armenian

Religion
- predominantly Judaism

Israelis in Armenia or Israeli Armenians are citizens or residents of Armenia who were originally from Israel, are of Israeli descent or hold dual citizenship with Israel.

== Community in Yerevan ==
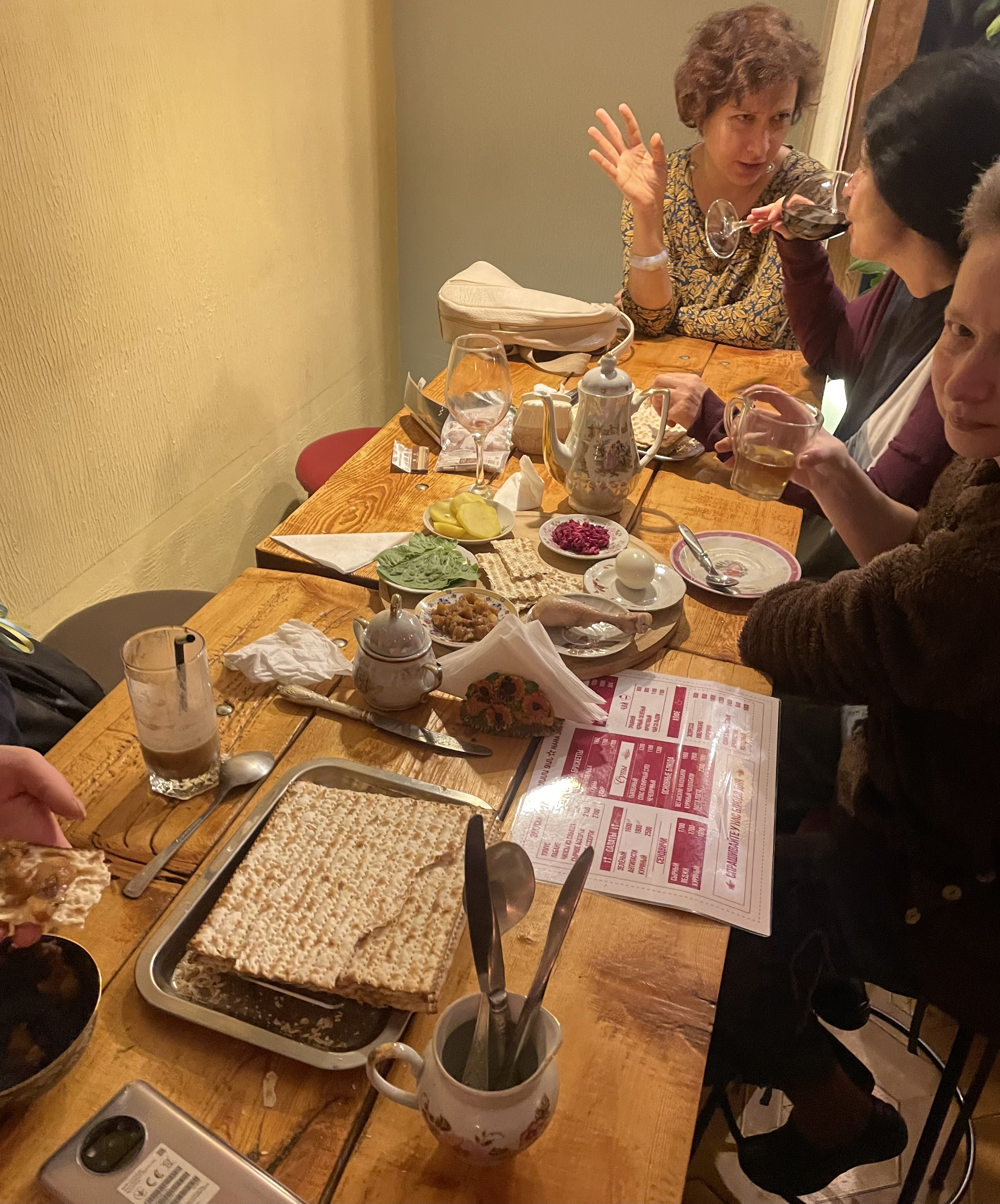
A Passover seder at the Israeli-owned restaurant Mama Jan in Yerevan

Like other immigrant communities in Armenia, Israelis are overwhelmingly concentrated in the country's capital, Yerevan. The community remains small but has been growing since 2022 thanks to the influx of Russian immigrants following the Russian invasion of Ukraine, which included a number of Russian-Israelis previously residing in Russia, and increasing yerida from Israel related to the 2023 judicial reform and the Gaza war.

In 2013, an honorary consulate of Israel was opened on Komitas Avenue in Arabkir, Yerevan. It is headed by Achot Chakhmouradian.

Notable Israelis residing in Yerevan include composer William Weiner, contemporary artist Vanane Borian, cultural activist Julia Kislev, journalist Dor Shabashewitz and chef Dmitry Shingarev.

Community meeting places for Israelis in Yerevan include the Mordechai Navi Synagogue, the Jewish Community of Armenia office on Koghbatsi Street and two Israeli-owned restaurants, Hummus Kimchi and Mama Jan, which host events on Jewish holidays.

== Tourism ==
Armenia is an increasingly popular destination for Israeli tourists. The 13th-century Jewish cemetery in the Armenian village of Yeghegis, Vayots Dzor Province, is one of the major attractions for Jewish visitors.

Amidst rising levels of antisemitism across the world during the Israel–Hamas war, Israel's National Security Council ranked Armenia as the safest country in the South Caucasus and Central Asia for Israeli visitors.

== Issues and controversies ==
In 2017, it was reported that the Israeli Ministry of Health asked the police to investigate a potential fraud scheme where Arab Israeli medical students were allegedly getting certificates from Armenian universities in exchange for bribes without actually completing their education.

== See also ==
- Armenia–Israel relations
- Armenians in Israel
- History of the Jews in Armenia
- Israeli diaspora
- Yerida
