= Mordechai Navi Synagogue =

Synagogue in Yerevan, Armenia

- Armenian: Մորդեխայ Նավի սինագոգ
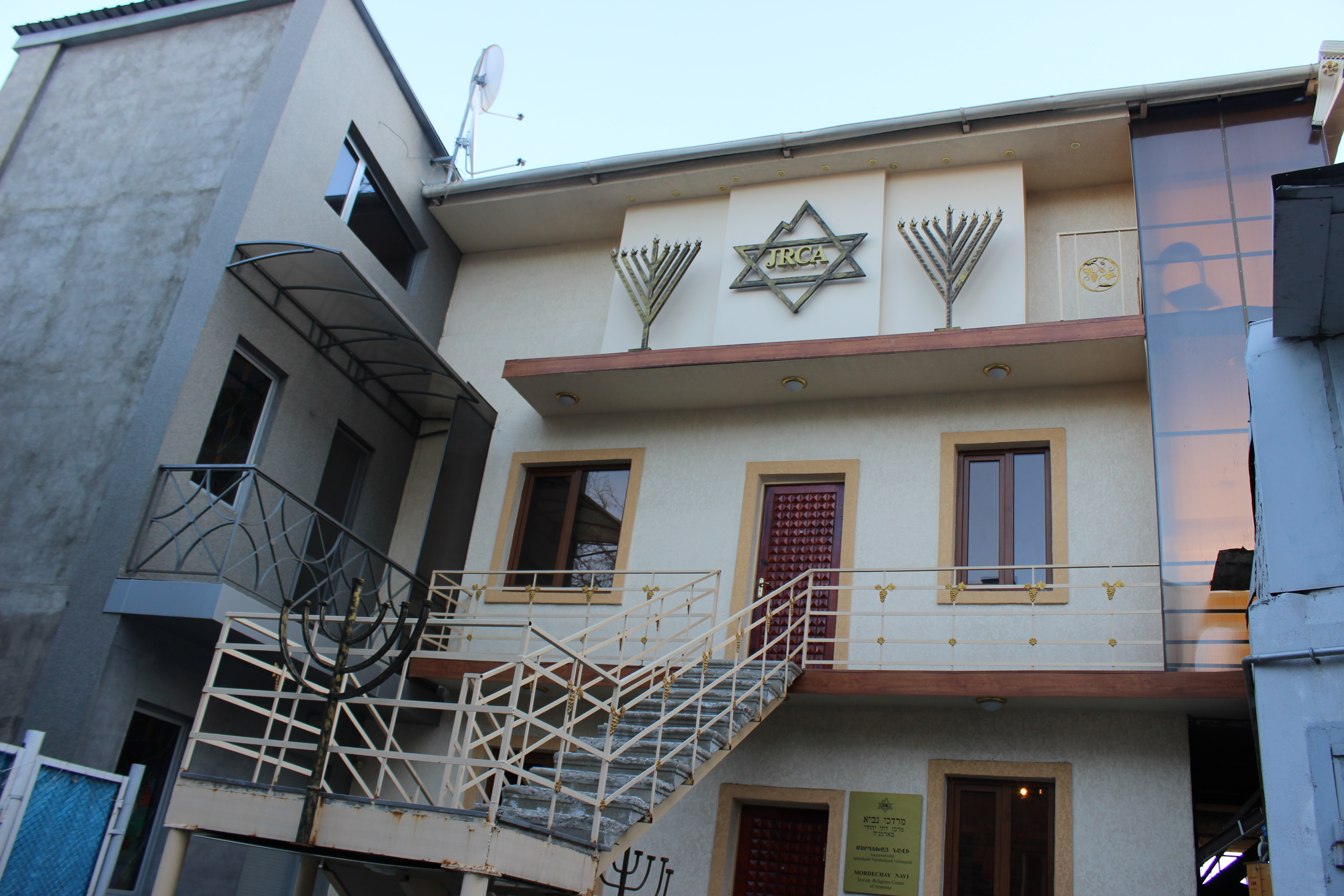
- Mordechai Navi synagogue, in 2014

- Location in Armenia

Religion
- Affiliation: Judaism
- Ecclesiastical or organizational status: Synagogue
- Leadership: Rabbi Armenia Gershon Burstein
- Status: Active

Location
- Location: 23 Nar Dos Street, Kentron, Yerevan 0018
- Country: Armenia
- Interactive map of Mordechai Navi Synagogue
- Coordinates: 40°09′58″N 44°30′50″E

Architecture
- Established: c. 1840s (as a congregation)
- Completed: 2011

Mordechai Navi Synagogue (Armenian: Մորդեխայ Նավի սինագոգ, lit. 'Mordechai Navi synagogue'), also called the Mordechai Navi Jewish Centre, is a Jewish congregation and synagogue, located at 23 Nar Dos Street, in the central Kentron district of Yerevan, the capital of Armenia. The synagogue was opened in June 2011.

== Background ==
The Mordechai Navi Synagogue is the only synagogue in Armenia. It is located on 23 Nar-Dos Street of the central Kentron district. It is headed by the Chief Rabbi of Armenia Gershon Burstein.

The Jewish community in Armenia has a history of 2,000 years, when first Jewish groups settled in Armenia after the destruction of Solomon's Temple in Jerusalem. However, currently the Jewish population in Armenia is around 100 only. Rima Varzhapetyan-Feller is the head of the Jewish community in Armenia since 1996. According to Varzhapetyan, Jews rarely had problems in Armenia.

== History ==
It was opened in June 2011, with the financial assistance of the Armenian businessman David Galstyan.

=== Antisemitic attacks ===
The synagogue and Yerevan's Jewish community has been targeted in several vandalism incidents. On 15 November 2023, a vandal poured fuel on the synagogue's door, setting the building on fire. No serious damage was reported and no one was in the building at the time. Videos of the incident were shared by news outlets in Azerbaijan, against whom Armenia has fought several wars. The attack was condemned by Israeli ambassador to Armenia Joel Lion. The following day, Armenian authorities opened an investigation.

== See also ==
- History of the Jews in Armenia
