= Sedat Laçiner =

Turkish academic (born 1972)

Sedat Laciner
- Born: July 1, 1972 (age 54); Kırıkkale, Turkey
- Education: Ankara University, Sheffield University, University of Sheffield King's College London
- Occupations: Academician, writer, strategist
- Writing career
- Years active: 2001-present
- Notable awards: Young Global Leader 2006

Sedat Laçiner (born 1972 in Kırıkkale, Turkey) is a Turkish academic specialist on the Middle East and International Relations, with particular reference to Turkish foreign policy and the former rector of Çanakkale Onsekiz Mart University (COMU).

== Biography ==
Laçiner studied at Ankara University, as well as the University of Sheffield, where he was awarded an MA in International Politics (with distinction), and King's College London, where he gained his PhD.

Since 2001, he has been teaching International Relations and International Security at the Çanakkale Onsekiz Mart University and the National Police Academy Security Studies Institute, Ankara. Prof. Laçiner was appointed president of the Çanakkale Onsekiz Mart University in 2011 and became the youngest rector in Turkey.

He is editor of the "Journal of Administrative Studies" and the "Review of International Law and Politics", as well as being a regular contributor to TRT and other Turkish TV and radio broadcasts. He is also chairman of the Journal of Turkish Weekly, a regular columnist of the Turkish daily national newspaper Star and the general coordinator of the Ankara-based Turkish think tank International Strategic Research Organization (ISRO)

He is currently Professor of International Relations and adviser to Turkish Higher Education Council Presidency (YÖK).

He was awarded the title of 'Young Global Leader 2006' by the World Economic Forum(Davos Economic Forum).

In 2011 he was appointed president to the Çanakkale Onsekiz Mart University (ÇOMÜ) by Turkish President Abdullah Gül.

He is the author/co-author or editor of numerous books and articles, including "Iraq Global War and Turkey", "The Iraq Crisis", "Turks and Armenians", "The World and Turkey", "European Union with Turkey, Turkey's Membership's Impact on the EU", "The Armenian Diaspora" and "Britain from a Different Perspective". He has written many articles that reject the Armenian genocide claims, which he has termed a "so called genocide".

He was arrested in July 2016 after the attempted coup in Turkey, and he reports that the state's attorney has asked for life imprisonment.

Laçiner was released on January, 1, 2023, after spending approximately six years in prison. Currently, he hosts programs on international relations and politics on his YouTube channel, which his operates under his own name.

== Bibliography ==
- Financing The PKK Terrorism and Drug Trafficking, 2016
- Turkish - Polish Relations: Past, Present and Future, 2015
- European Union with Turkey — 2005
- Turkey And The World: a complete English bibliography of Turkey and Turks — 2001
- From Kemalism to Ozalism the ideological evolution of Turkish foreign policy — 2001
