= History of the Jews in Armenia =

Armenian Jews: יהדות ארמניה; Հրեաներ
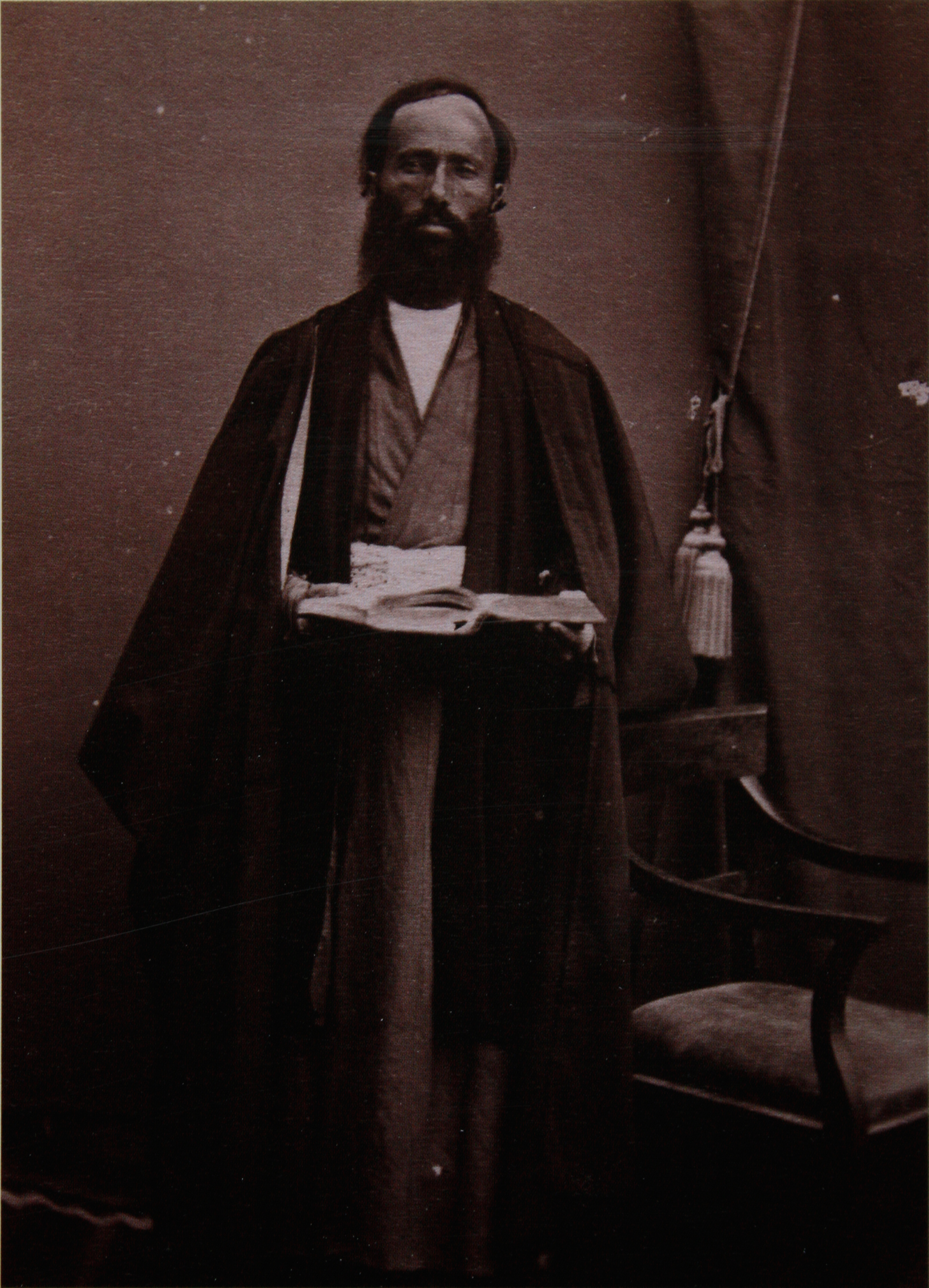
- An Armenian Jew

Total population
- 118 (2022 census data)

Languages
- Hebrew; Armenian

Religion
- Judaism

Related ethnic groups
- Other Jews (Ashkenazi, Sephardic, Mizrahi), Georgian Jews, Mountain Jews, German Jews, Czech Jews, Polish Jews, Hungarian Jews, Russian Jews, Ukrainian Jews

The history of the Jews in Armenia is one of the oldest Jewish communities in the Caucasus region. There is evidence of Jewish settlement in the Armenian Highlands dating as early 1st century BC.

== Historical Armenia ==
There are historical records that attest to the presence of Jews in pagan Armenia, before the spread of Christianity in the region by St. Gregory the Illuminator in 301 AD. Early medieval Armenian historians, such as 5th century historian Moses Khorenatsi, held that during the conquest of Armenian King Tigranes the Great (95–55 BC) he brought with him 10,000 Jewish captives to the ancient Kingdom of Armenia (which encompassed what is commonly known as Greater Armenia) when he retreated from Judea, because of the Roman attack on Armenia in 69 BC. Tigranes II invaded Syria, and probably the northern (Roman province of) Judea as well. A large Jewish population was settled in Armenia from the 1st century BC. One city in particular, Vartkesavan, became an important commercial center. Like the rest of Armenia's population, they suffered the consequences of regional powers trying to divide and conquer the country. By 360–370 AD, there was a massive increase in Jewish Hellenistic immigration into Armenia; many Armenian towns became predominately Jewish. After the conquest of Armenia in the 4th century AD by the Sassanid King Shapur II, he deported thousands of Jewish families from Persian Armenia and resettled them at Isfahan in modern Iran.

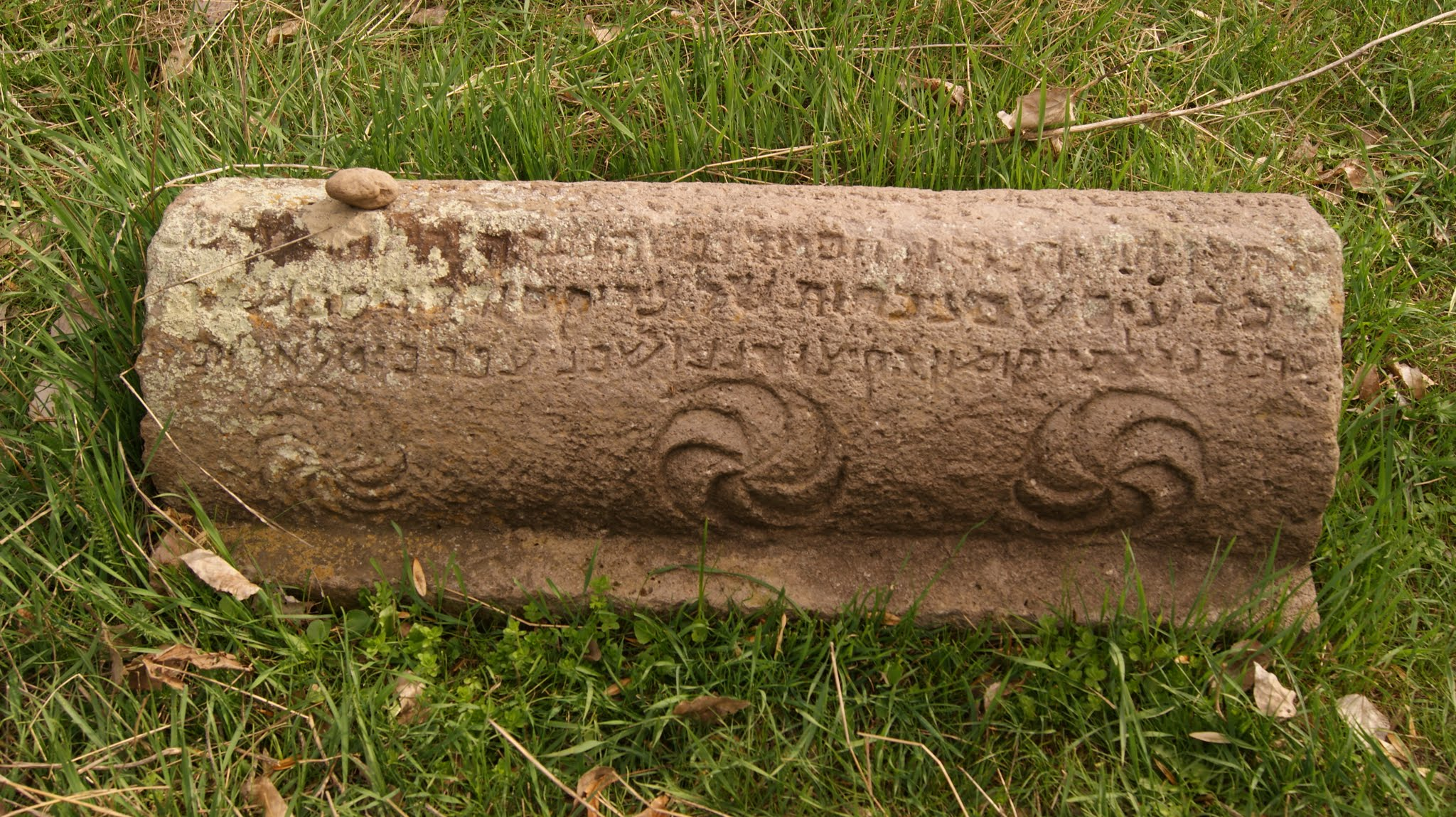
Jewish cemetery in Yeghegis, 13th century

In 1912 the archaeologist Nikolai Marr announced the discovery in 1910 of a tombstone in the village of Yeghegis that carried a Hebrew inscription. In 1996 investigations at Yeghegis, in Armenia's province of Vayotz Dzor, discovered the remains of a medieval Jewish cemetery from a previously unknown Jewish community. In 2000, a team from the Hebrew University of Jerusalem excavated on the southern side of the Yeghegis river, opposite the village, a Jewish cemetery with 40 gravestones with Hebrew inscriptions dating between 1266 and 1347. One non-Hebrew word in the inscriptions may indicate the origin of the community. Michael Nosonovsky has stated that "The word khawajah is of Persian origin and it probably indicates that the Jews who settled in Yeghegis came from Persia and kept Persian as their spoken language. Biblical quotations and Talmudic formulas are evidence of a high learning standard in the community." A group of Armenian and Israeli archaeologists and historians excavated the site in 2001 and 2002 and found 64 more tombstones. Some are decorated with motifs of the Orbelian kingdom. The archaeological team also found three mills, which the bishop says show that the community had a business because one mill could feed several families. 9 of these tombstones had inscriptions, all in Hebrew except for two, which were in Aramaic. The oldest dated stone was from 1266 and the latest date was 1336/7.

== Modern period ==
Historical Armenian Jewish population
Year	Pop.	±%
1926	335	—
1939	512	+52.8%
1959	1,042	+103.5%
1970	1,049	+0.7%
1979	962	−8.3%
1989	747	−22.3%
2001	109	−85.4%
2011	127	+16.5%
Source: The Jewish population data includes Mountain Jews, Georgian Jews, Bukharan Jews (or Central Asian Jews), Krymchaks (all per the 1959 Soviet census), and Tats.

In 1828, the Russo-Persian War came to an end and Eastern Armenia (currently the Republic of Armenia) was annexed to the Russian Empire with the Treaty of Turkmenchai. Polish and Iranian Jews began arriving, as well as Sabbatarians (Subbotniks, Russian peasants who were banished to the outskirts of Imperial Russia during the reign of Catherine II. They were Judaizing Christians and mostly converted to mainstream Judaism or assimilated). Since 1840 they started creating Ashkenazi and Mizrahi communities respectively in Yerevan. Up to 1924 the Sephardic Sheikh Mordechai Synagogue was a leading institution in the Jewish community.

According to the 1897 Russian Empire Census there were some 415 people in Alexandropol (Gyumri) and 204 in Erivan (Yerevan) whose native language was "Jewish" and significantly smaller numbers elsewhere 6 in Vagharshapat, 15 in Novo-Bayazet. The number of self-reported Jewish-speakers was the following in other Armenian-populated areas of the Russian Empire that now lie outside Armenia: 4 in Shusha (Azerbaijan), 93 in Elizavetpol (Ganja, Azerbaijan), 4 in Iğdır (now Turkey), 424 in Kars (Turkey), 111 in Ardahan (Turkey), 189 in Akhalkalaki (Georgia), 438 in Akhaltsikhe (Georgia), 72 in Shulaveri (Georgia).

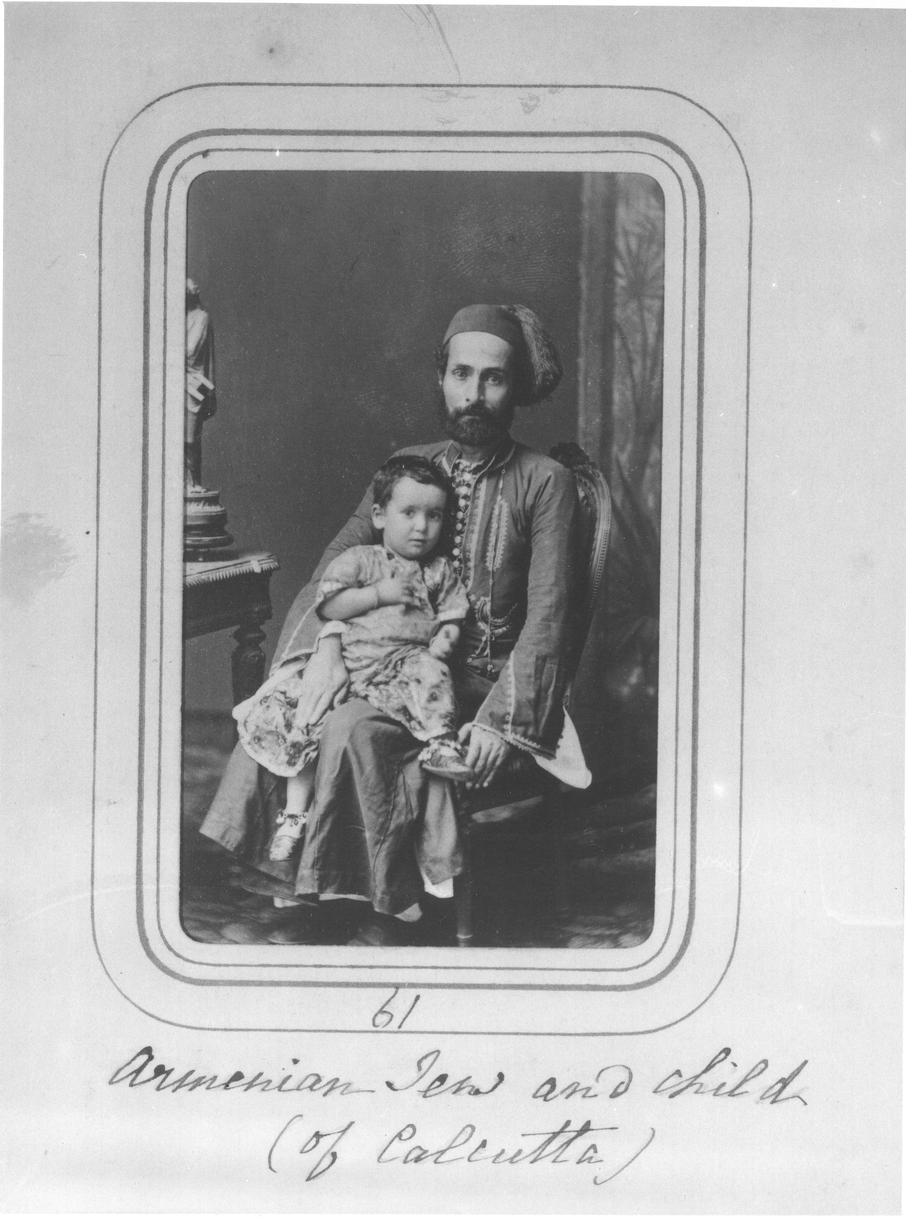
An Armenian Jew, photographed in the Bourne and Shepherd Calcutta studio

As for Western Armenia (Turkish Armenia), according to official Ottoman figures from 1914, 3,822 Jews lived in the "Six vilayets" that had significant Armenian population: 2,085 in Diyarbekir Vilayet, 1,383 in Van Vilayet, 344 in Sivas Vilayet, 10 in Erzurum Vilayet, and none in Bitlis and Mamuret-ul-Aziz (Harput). There were further 317 Jews in historical Cilicia: 66 in Adana Vilayet and 251 in Maraş Sanjak.

The Russian Jewish communities moved to Armenia on a larger scale during the Soviet period, looking for an atmosphere of tolerance in the area that was absent in the Russian SSR or Ukrainian SSR.

Following World War II, the Jewish population rose to approximately 5,000. In 1959, the Jewish population peaked in Soviet Armenia at approximately 10,000 people. Another wave of Jewish immigrants arrived in the country between 1965 and 1972, mainly intelligentsia, military, and engineers. These Jews arrived from Russia and Ukraine, attracted to the more liberal society. However, with the dissolution of the Soviet Union many of them left due to the First Nagorno-Karabakh War. Between 1992 and 1994, more than 6,000 Jews immigrated to Israel because of Armenia's political isolation and economic depression. Today the country's Jewish population has shrunk to around 750. In 1995, a Chabad House was established in Yerevan.

== Present day ==
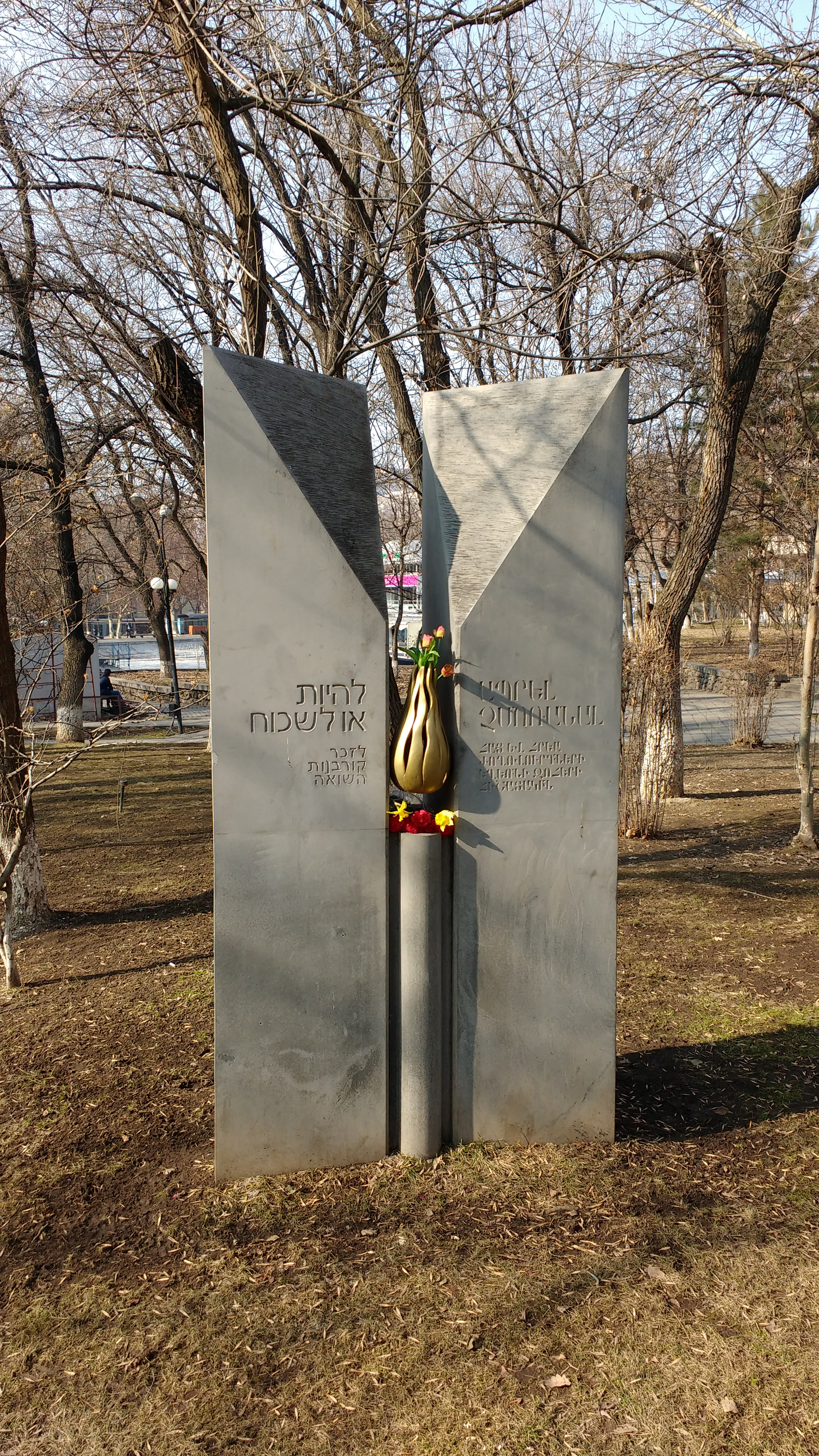
Jewish Holocaust Memorial in Yerevan

There are about 500–1000 Jews presently living in Armenia, mainly in the capital Yerevan.

There is a tiny community of Subbotniks (believed to be a Judaizing community that evolved from the Molokan Spiritual Christians) whose ancestors converted to Judaism, and who are quickly dwindling.

The Jewish Community in Yerevan is currently headed by Chief Rabbi Gershon Burshtein from the Chabad Lubavitch, and the sociopolitical matters are run by the Jewish Council of Armenia.

=== 2022 influx of Russian Jews ===
The Russian invasion of Ukraine in February 2022 triggered mass emigration from Russia caused by fear of mobilization and political repression. Over 40,000 Russians moved to Armenia thanks to its geographic proximity, relatively low cost of living and lax immigration rules. At least several hundred of these immigrants identify as Jewish. As a result, Armenia's Jewish population has at least doubled. A Russian Jewish community club called "Yerevan Jewish Home" was established by Nathaniel Trubkin, a Moscow journalist who immigrated to Armenia in March 2022.

== Human rights ==
The President of the Jewish Community in Armenia, Rima Varzhapetyan-Feller, has stated on January 23, 2015, that "The Jewish community feels itself protected in Armenia, and the authorities respect their rights, culture, and traditions. There is no anti-Semitism in Armenia, and we enjoy good relations with the Armenians. Of course, the community has certain problems that originate from the general situation of the country."

In 2005, Armen Avetisian, the openly antisemitic leader of the Armenian Aryan Union, a small ultranationalist party, alleged that there are as many as 50,000 "disguised" Jews in Armenia. He promised that he would work to have them expelled from the country. He was arrested in January 2005 on charges of inciting ethnic hatred.

There have been two recorded incidents, in 2007 and in 2010, of vandalism by unknown individuals on the Jewish side of the Joint Tragedies Memorial in Aragast Park, Yerevan that commemorates both the Armenian genocide and the Holocaust. This monument had replaced a smaller monument that had been defaced and toppled several times.

== See also ==
- Armenia–Israel relations
- Armenian–Jewish relations
- Armenian Quarter
- Armenians in Israel
- Antisemitism in Armenia
- Israelis in Armenia
