= Sheikh Mordechai Synagogue =

Former synagogue in Yerevan, Armenia

- Armenian: Շեյք Մորդեխայ սինագոգ

Religion
- Affiliation: Judaism (former)
- Rite: Nusach Sefard
- Ecclesiastical or organizational status: Synagogue (1850–1924)
- Status: Destroyed

Location
- Location: Yerevan
- Country: Armenia

Architecture
- Established: c. 1840 (as a congregation)
- Completed: 1860
- Destroyed: 1924

Sheikh Mordechai Synagogue (Armenian: Շեյք Մորդեխայ սինագոգ), was a Sephardic Jewish congregation and synagogue, located in Yerevan, the capital of Armenia. Up until 1924, Sheikh Mordechai was a leading institution and center of communal Jewish life for Jews in Armenia.

== History ==
The Jewish community in Armenia has a history of 2,000 years, when first Jewish groups settled in Armenia after the destruction of Solomon's Temple in Jerusalem.

From 1840, two groups of Jews existed in Armenia, Ashkenazis from the Russian Empire and Sephardis from Persia. Both communities had their own separate houses of worship and community leaders. The Sheikh Mordechai Synagogue began operating in 1860 to serve the Persian Sephardic population of Yerevan. The Persian language was used along with Hebrew in prayer at the synagogue. The synagogue remained in use until 1924 when it was destroyed under the Soviet Union.

As of 2009 the Jewish population in Armenia was around 500–1,000 with one synagogue in Yerevan.

== See also ==
- History of the Jews in Armenia
