= Armenia–Palestine relations =

- Armenia: Palestine

Armenia–Palestine relations refers to relations between Armenia and Palestine. Armenia supports Palestinian statehood. Armenia is an observer state of the Arab League in which Palestine is a full member. The former president of Armenia Serzh Sargsyan has stated that Armenia supported the Palestinian people's self determination in an interview with Al Mayadeen. President of Palestine Mahmoud Abbas has also expressed his strong support for the expansion of relations with Armenia, describing Armenians as a "great ally of Palestine". Reflecting these close diplomatic ties, the Armenian government officially recognized the State of Palestine on 21 June 2024

== Armenians in Palestine ==
There are currently 4,500 Armenians living in Palestine. In 1948, the total Armenian population in Palestine was 15,000. Many Armenians have migrated in recent decades due to conflict and economic struggle, with thousands repatriating to Soviet Armenia or migrating to other countries during the 1948 Arab–Israeli War. The presence of Armenians in the Armenian Quarter of Jerusalem goes back to the 4th century AD with the Armenian Patriarchate of Jerusalem being established since 638 AD.

== Trade ==
Trade between Armenia and Palestine has risen in recent years. Exports from Palestine to Armenia include packaged medicaments and exports from Armenia to Palestine include fruit juice and chocolate.

== 2010s ==
On 20 June 2011, Fatah representative Nabil Shaath met with Foreign Minister Eduard Nalbandyan to enlist the support of Armenia in the then-upcoming application by Palestine for membership in the United Nations. Afterwards, Shaath announced that he had been informed by a number of countries that they would recognize Palestine in the following weeks, and that he expected Armenia to be the first of these. However, the Armenian government did not release any statement regarding the meeting. The situation in Palestine was seen as analogous by the Armenian government to the Nagorno-Karabakh conflict, and that any recognition of a Palestinian state by Armenia would set a precedent for the right to self-determination in that region. On similar situations, President Serzh Sargsyan previously stated, "Having the Nagorno-Karabakh conflict, Armenia can not recognize another entity in the same situation as long as it has not recognized the Nagorno-Karabakh Republic".

== 2020s ==
In January 2020, Armenian President Armen Sarkissian visited Bethlehem and met with Palestinian president Mahmoud Abbas.

In November 2021, the Armenian foreign minister Ararat Mirzoyan met with his Palestinian counterpart in Paris.

On 27 October 2023, Armenia was one of 121 countries to vote in favor of a General Assembly resolution calling for an immediate ceasefire to the Gaza war.

On 21 June 2024, the Armenian government recognized the State of Palestine in accordance with the foregoing and in line with their dedication to international law, equality, sovereignty, and the peaceful coexistence of peoples.

On 27 September 2024, on the fringes of the UN General Assembly's high-level session in New York, Prime Minister of the State of Palestine Mohammad Mustafa and Armenia's Minister of Foreign Affairs Ararat Mirzoyan signed a joint communiqué on the establishment of diplomatic relations between their two nations.

In July 2025, an agreement was made between the Prime Minister of Armenia and the President of Egypt, in which humanitarian aid was sent to Gaza in support of the activities of the UN Relief and Works Agency for Palestine Refugees in the Near East (UNRWA). An agreement with Palestine whereby their endangered cultural heritage will temporarily reside at the Matenadaran has also been made.

== Cultural relations ==
Outside of governmental relations, many Armenians and Palestinians look to each other in solidarity due to Israeli foreign policy and mistreatment. For many years, anti-Armenian sentiment (often mixed with anti-Christian sentiment) was growing in Israel, coinciding with a general rise of Zionist nationalism. This is seen in a report done in 2009, claiming that Armenians were often spat on by Haredi and Orthodox Jews. In 2023, anti-Christian hatred grew to never-before-seen levels. A long standing issue between Armenia and Israel that invokes further solidarity is Israel's longstanding issue with the Armenian genocide. Its government position has avoided recognition so as to not hurt its relations with Turkey and Azerbaijan. Similarly, Israel supplying weapons to Azerbaijan has soured relations between both countries, especially due to the 2023 exodus of Nagorno-Karabakh Armenians.

== See also ==
- Armenia–Israel relations
- Foreign relations of Armenia
- Foreign relations of Palestine
