= Journal of Turkish Weekly =

- Website type: News
- Owner: International Strategic Research Organization
- Website: http://www.turkishweekly.net
- Current status: Closed

Journal of Turkish Weekly was an English language Turkish news website run by the International Strategic Research Organization, targeted towards policymakers. The journal provided a Turkish approach on global and regional issues. Established in 2004, it is owned by the USAK Derneği, which publishes other printed and online periodicals. It was updated online at least five times daily.

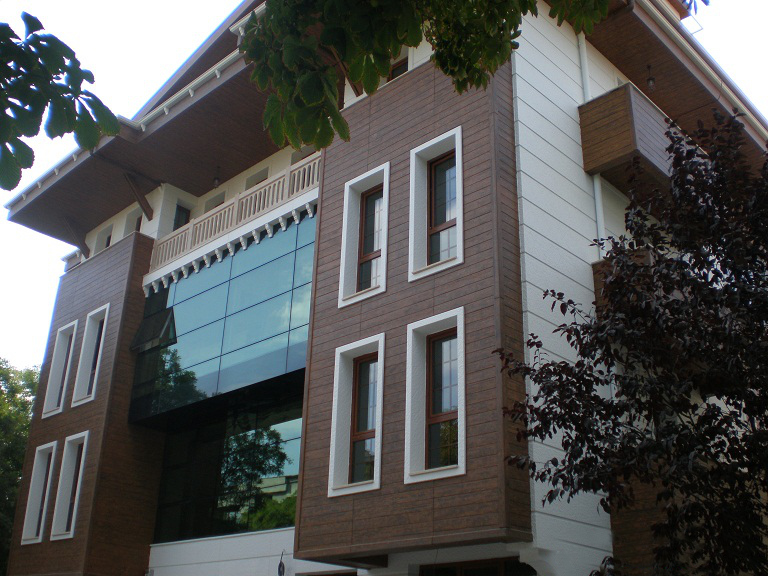
JTW Headquarters, Ankara 2010

Its website provided free access to the full text of recent articles and book reviews. Topics covered by these include: Turkish politics, relations between Turkey and the European Union; Turkey and terrorism; the Cyprus issue; security issues relating to Armenia; Turkish history; ethnic groups; Islamic fundamentalism; and Turkey.

== Major sections ==
The online newspaper was organized into three sections:

1. News, which includes national, world, economy, Balkans, Europe, Middle East and Africa, Central Asia, Caucasus and Americas
2. Comments, which includes editorials, op-eds and letters to the editor.
3. Articles, which include English, German, and Turkish articles on Turkey, Central Asia, Russia, Europe, Americas, law, and security

The journal claimed to receive about 350,000 website visits per month.

== Columnists ==
- Serpil Açıkalın
- Nermin Aydemir
- Alon Ben-Meir
- İhsan Bal
- Haluk Direskeneli
- Çağlar Dölek
- Arzu Celalifer Ekinci
- Çağrı Erhan
- Metin Gezen
- İrem Güney
- Rovshan İbrahimov
- Habibe Kader
- Kamer Kasım
- Imran Khan
- İbrahim Kay
- Havva Kök
- Mustafa Kutlay
- Sedat Laçiner
- Mirzet Mujezinovic
- Mehmet Özcan
- Mehmet Yegin
- Hasan Selim Özertem
- Güner Özkan
- Sundeep Waslekar
- Barış Sanlı
- Fatma Yılmaz
- Syed Muzammiluddin
