= Yair Auron =

Israeli historian

- יאיר אורון
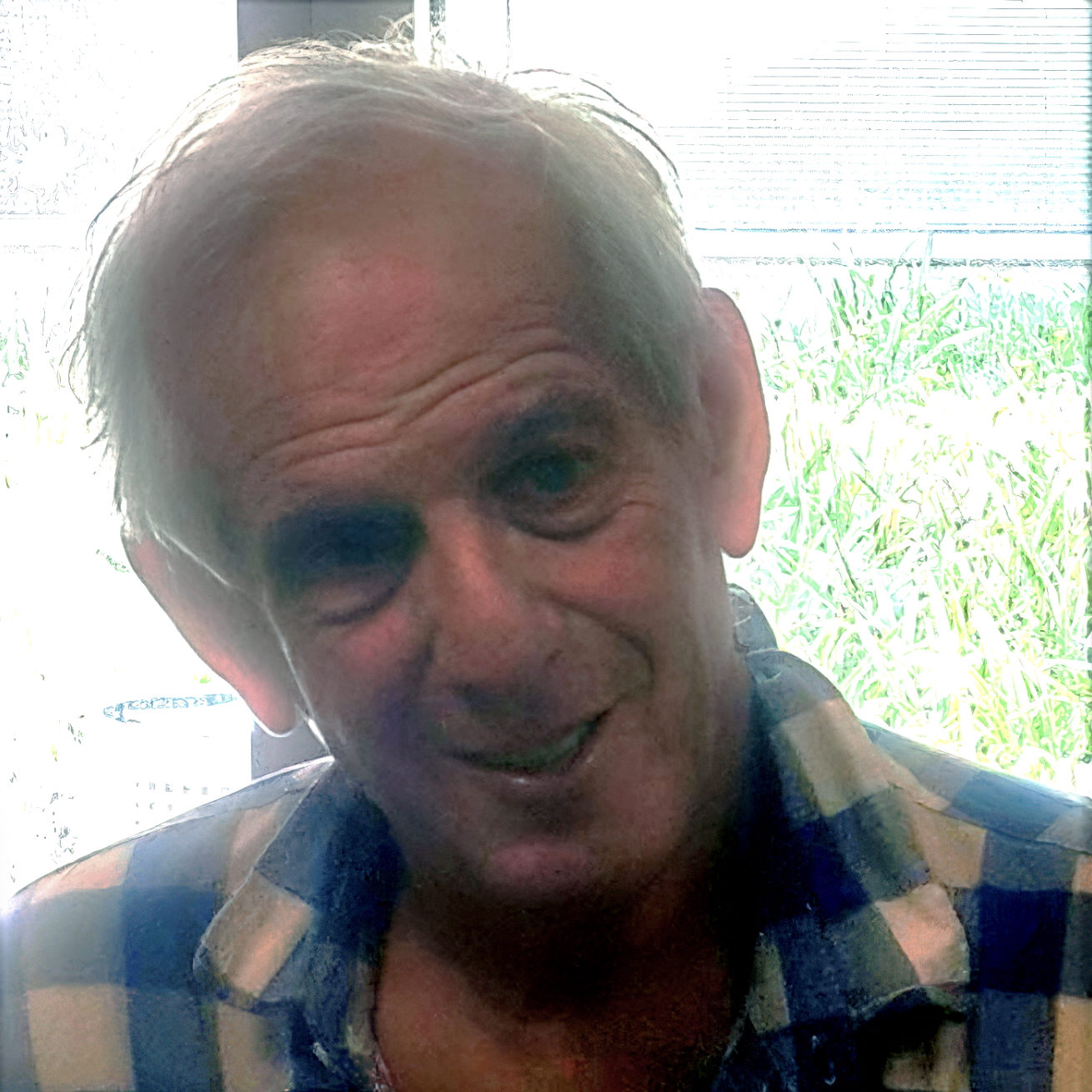
- Born: April 30, 1945 (age 81); Mandatory Palestine
- Education: Tel-Aviv University
- Occupations: Historian, Scholar

Yair Auron (Hebrew: יאיר אורון, Ya'ir Oron; born April 30, 1945) is an Israeli historian, scholar and expert specializing in Holocaust and genocide studies, racism and contemporary Jewry. Since 2005, he has served as the head of the Department of Sociology, Political Science and Communication of the Open University of Israel and an associate professor.

== Biography ==
Yair Auron completed his bachelor's degree in history and sociology at the Tel-Aviv University. He earned a master's degree from The Hebrew University, and a Ph.D. from the Université de la Sorbonne Nouvelle in Paris (France).

== Academic career ==
From 1974 to 1976, Auron worked as the director of the Education Department inside the Yad Vashem (the Holocaust Memorial in Jerusalem). In the 1980s, he worked as a researcher at the Melton Center for Jewish Education of the Hebrew University and also as an academic director of European Section at the Israel-Diaspora Institute, an external institute of Tel-Aviv University. From 1996 to 1999 he was a senior lecturer and head of the Division of Cultural Studies at the Max Stern Academic College of Emek Yezreel.

Auron is an associate director of the Institute on the Holocaust and Genocide, Jerusalem. He is also a member of the academic board of directors at the Zoryan Institute (an NPO) in Cambridge, Massachusetts (US) and an advisory board member of The Genocide Education Project (also known as GenEd, an NPO) in San Francisco (US).

== Published works ==
- Jewish-Israeli Identity, Sifriat Poalim (with Kibutzim College of Education), Tel-Aviv, 1993, 204 pp. (Hebrew).
- The Banality of Indifference: The Attitude of the Yishuv and the Zionist Movement to the Armenian Genocide, Dvir (with Kibutzim College of Education), Tel-Aviv, 1995, 395 pp. (Hebrew).
- Les Juifs d’Extrême Gauche en Mai 68, Éditions Albin Michel, Paris, 1998, 335 pp.
- We are all German Jews: Jewish Radicals in France During the Sixties and Seventies, Am Oved (with Tel-Aviv University and Ben-Gurion University ), Tel-Aviv, 1999, 288 pp. (Hebrew, translation of the French edition, with revisions).
- The Banality of Indifference: Zionism and the Armenian Genocide, Transaction, Rutgers University Press, New Brunswick, 2000, 405 pp. (translation of the Hebrew edition, with revisions and adaptations). Second Edition, Transaction Publishers, 2001; Third Edition, 2003.
- The Banality of Denial, Transaction, Rutgers University Press, New Brunswick, 2003, 338 pp.
- Denial: Israel and the Armenian Genocide, Maba, Tel Aviv, 2005 (Hebrew edition, with revisions and adaptations).
- The Pain of Knowledge - Holocaust and Genocide issues in Education, Transaction, New Brunswick, 2005. A German edition was published by Der Schmerz des Wissens, Verlag Edition AV, Lich/Hessen, 2005.

== See also ==
- Armenia–Israel relations
- Genocide studies
- Holocaust studies
