= Robert Melson (political scientist) =

American political scientist (born 1937)

- Born: 1937 (age 88–89)
- Education: PhD in Political Science from MIT (1967)

Robert Melson (born 1937) is professor emeritus of political science and a member of the Jewish studies program at Purdue University. From 2003 to 2005, he was the President of the International Association of Genocide Scholars (IAGS). In 2006 and 2007, he was the Cathy Cohen-Lasry Distinguished Professor in the Strassler Family Center for Holocaust and Genocide Studies at Clark University, Worcester, Massachusetts.

== Early life ==
Melson survived the Holocaust in Poland, escaping a pogrom with his parents and later living under false papers.

== Work ==
His primary area of expertise is in ethnic conflict and genocide. His interest in the topic derives from his family's experience in Europe, as well as from his field work in Nigeria in 1964–65, just before the onset of the Nigerian Civil War. The story of his family's shared survival during the Holocaust is told in False Papers (University of Illinois Press, 2000), which was a finalist for the 2001 National Jewish Book Award.

Among his other books are, Revolution and Genocide: On the Origins of the Armenian Genocide and the Holocaust (University of Chicago Press, 1992/6). He has published (with Howard Wolpe, eds.), Nigeria: Modernization and the Politics of Communalism. (East Lansing: Michigan State University Press, 1971). His articles have been published in the American Political Science Review, Comparative Studies in Society and History, Holocaust and Genocide Studies, and elsewhere.
