= Rima Varzhapetyan-Feller =

Armenian activist

- Ռիմա Վարժապետյան-Ֆելլեր (Armenian); Римма Варжапетян-Феллер (Russian)
- Born: Rima Varzhapetyan
- Occupation: Mechanical engineer
- Title: President of the Jewish Community of Armenia

Rima Varzhapetyan-Feller is an Armenian activist and a leader of the Jewish Armenian community.

== Leadership and activism ==
Varzhapetyan-Feller has been the president of the Jewish Community of Armenia since 1996, a community which currently stands at 1,000 people, despite Jews being present in Armenia since the days of Tigranes the Great. She is also a member of the European Jewish Parliament, representing Armenia.

She has spoken against the idea that Armenia is an antisemitic country.

She has campaigned for the recognition of the Armenian genocide, especially by Israel, even sending an open letter to the Knesset in 2012.

=== Accusations of glorifying of Nazi collaborators ===
On April 28, 2015, Arye Gut, an Israeli of Azerbaijani origin, accused Varzhapetyan of not denouncing the publication of antisemitic books in Armenia and the glorification of Drastamat Kanayan, leader of the Armenian Legion and collaborator with Nazi Germany during World War II. In response, Varzhapetyan-Feller sent a letter to the Jewish Journal, suggesting that Gut's claims of the Armenian Legion's actions were exaggerated and that Armenia treats its Jewish community well. She has criticized Israeli and U.S. Jewish newspapers who have published similar articles, suggesting they have an anti-Armenian bias.

She has also criticized the leadership of Azerbaijan for whitewashing the image of Azerbaijan in the eyes of Israel and the U.S. Jewish community.

== Early and personal life ==
Varzhapetyan-Feller was raised in a Jewish-Armenian family. Her father fought in World War II.

Varzhapetyan-Feller is a mechanical engineer. She is married to a Christian Armenian man, and the couple have two sons.
