= State funeral of Talaat Pasha =

1943 ceremony for Turkish politician

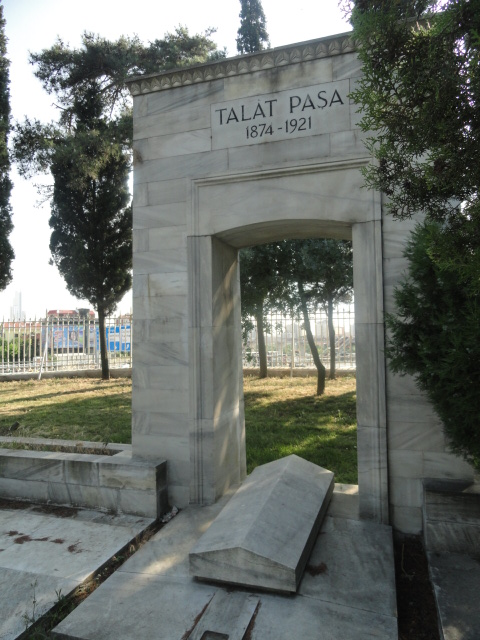
Talaat was buried in 1943 at the Monument of Liberty, Istanbul, as a national hero.

The state funeral of Talaat Pasha, former Grand Vizier of the Ottoman Empire took place at the Monument of Liberty in Istanbul, Turkey, on 25 February 1943. At the request of the office of the prime minister of Turkey, Şükrü Saracoğlu, Talaat's remains (which had been buried in Berlin since his assassination in 1921) were disinterred and transported to Turkey. The funeral was attended by Prime Minister Saracoğlu, German ambassador to Turkey Franz von Papen, and Turkish journalist Ahmet Emin Yalman. With this gesture, Adolf Hitler hoped to secure Turkish support for the Axis in World War II. Hüseyin Cahit Yalçın gave the funeral oration as Talaat was buried at the monument, originally dedicated to those who lost their lives preventing the 1909 Ottoman countercoup.

Swiss historian Hans-Lukas Kieser has argued that Talaat's reburial symbolized his being "fully rehabilitated and installed as an outstanding and positive figure in public Turkish history". The return of Talaat's body occurred shortly after the 1942 wealth tax intended to financially ruin non-Muslim citizens of Turkey. Turkish writer Orhan Seyfi condemned the acquittal of Talaat's assassin, Soghomon Tehlirian, but argued Germany made up for this by transporting Talaat's body to Turkey in 1943. Writing in Ulus, journalist Yunus Nadi emphasized continuity and the debt that the republic owed to Talaat's efforts, as well as the legitimacy of the fight against non-Turkish elements. In 1946, Yalçın published Talaat's memoirs, describing him in the preface as "a strong patriot, prepared to sacrifice everything, even his own life, for the salvation and well-being of the fatherland". In the past, commemorative ceremonies were held to honor Talaat at the Monument of Liberty, but this practice has been discontinued as of 2013.

== Sources ==
- Adak, Hülya (2007). "Identifying the "Internal Tumors" of World War I: Talat Paşa's hatıraları [Talat Paşa's Memoirs], or the Travels of a Unionist Apologia into History". Raueme Des Selbst: Selbstzeugnisforschung Transkulturell. Böhlau Verlag. pp. 151–169. ISBN 978-3-412-23406-5.
- Garibian, Sévane (2018). ""Commanded by my Mother's Corpse": Talaat Pasha, or the Revenge Assassination of a Condemned Man". Journal of Genocide Research. 20 (2): 220–235. doi:10.1080/14623528.2018.1459160. S2CID 81928705.
- Hofmann, Tessa (2020). "A Hundred Years Ago: The Assassination of Mehmet Talaat (15 March 1921) and the Berlin Criminal Proceedings against Soghomon Tehlirian (2/3 June 1921): Background, Context, Effect" (PDF). International Journal of Armenian Genocide Studies. 5 (1): 67–90. doi:10.51442/ijags.0009. ISSN 1829-4405. Archived (PDF) from the original on 21 March 2021.
- Kieser, Hans-Lukas (2018). Talaat Pasha: Father of Modern Turkey, Architect of Genocide. Princeton University Press. ISBN 978-1-4008-8963-1.
- Olson, Robert W. (1986). "The Remains of Talat: a Dialectic Between Republic and Empire". Die Welt des Islams. 26 (1–4): 46–56. doi:10.1163/157006086X00034. JSTOR 1570757.
