= Assassination of Talaat Pasha =

1921 assassination in Berlin, Germany

- Part of Operation Nemesis
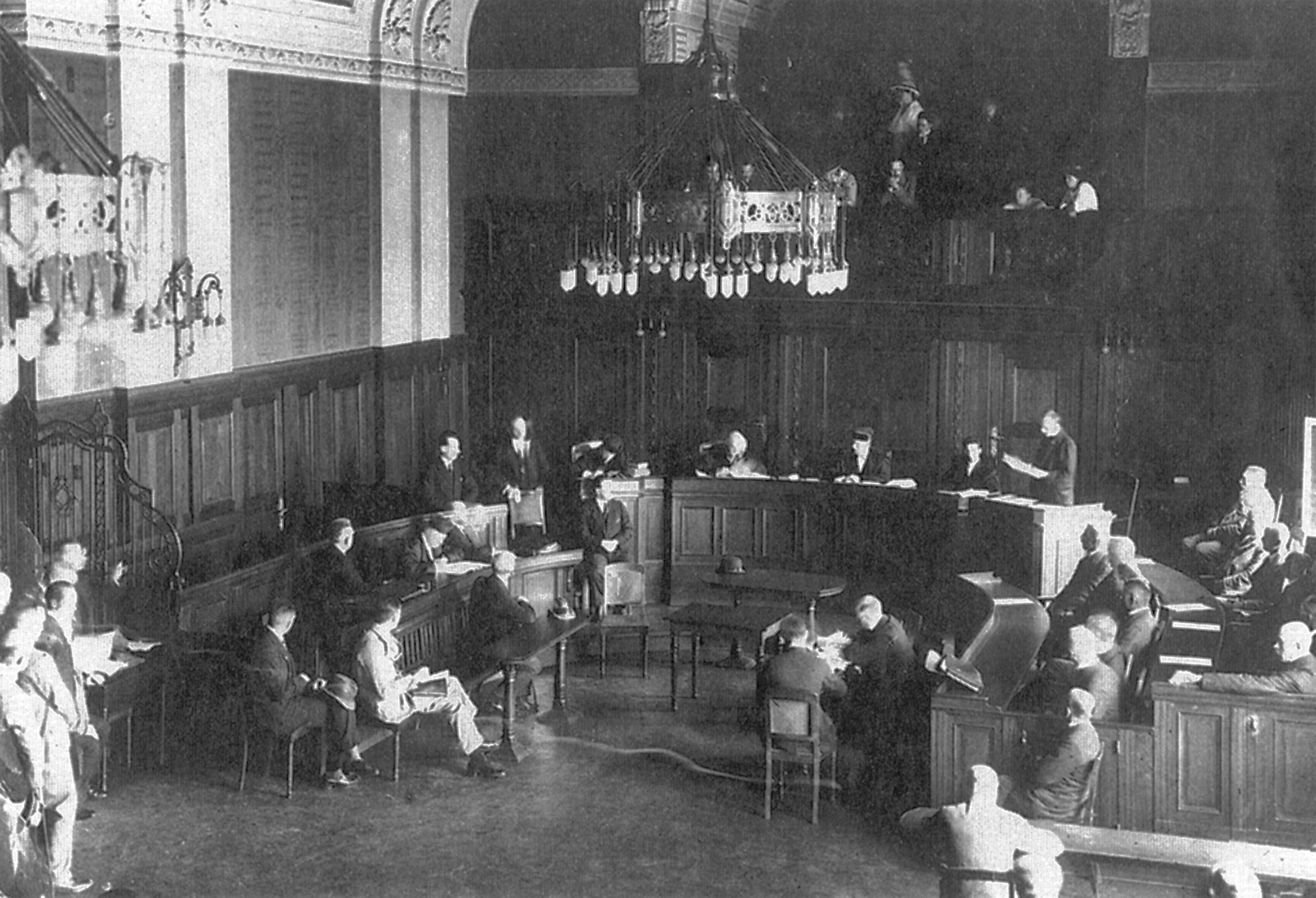
- Courtroom during the trial
- Location: 52°30′21″N 13°19′58″E; Hardenbergstraße 17, Charlottenburg, Berlin, Brandenburg, Germany
- Date: 15 March 1921
- Weapon: Luger pistol
- Deaths: Talaat Pasha
- Motive: Revenge for the Armenian genocide
- Accused: Soghomon Tehlirian
- Verdict: Acquittal

On 15 March 1921, Armenian student Soghomon Tehlirian killed Talaat Pasha—former grand vizier of the Ottoman Empire and the main architect of the Armenian genocide—in Berlin. At his trial, Tehlirian argued, "I have killed a man, but I am not a murderer"; the jury acquitted him.

Tehlirian came from Erzindjan in the Ottoman Empire but moved to Serbia before the war. He served in the Armenian volunteer units of the Russian army and lost most of his family in the genocide. Deciding to take revenge, he assassinated Harutiun Mgrditichian, who helped the Ottoman secret police, in Constantinople. Tehlirian joined Operation Nemesis, a clandestine program carried out by the Dashnaktsutyun (the Armenian Revolutionary Federation); he was chosen for the mission to assassinate Talaat due to his previous success. Talaat had already been convicted and sentenced to death by an Ottoman court-martial, but was living in Berlin with the permission of the Government of Germany. Many prominent Germans attended Talaat's funeral; the German Foreign Office sent a wreath saying, "To a great statesman and a faithful friend."

Tehlirian's trial was held 2–3 June 1921, and the defense strategy was to put Talaat on trial for the Armenian genocide. Extensive evidence on the genocide was heard, resulting in "one of the most spectacular trials of the twentieth century", according to Stefan Ihrig. Tehlirian claimed he had acted alone and that the killing was not premeditated, telling a dramatic and realistic, but untrue, story of surviving the genocide and witnessing the deaths of his family members. The international media widely reported on the trial, which brought attention and recognition of the facts of the Armenian genocide; Tehlirian's acquittal brought mostly favorable reactions.

Both Talaat Pasha and Tehlirian are considered by their respective sides to be heroes; historian Alp Yenen refers to this relationship as the "Talat–Tehlirian complex". Talaat was buried in Germany, but Turkey repatriated his remains in 1943 and gave him a state funeral. Polish-Jewish lawyer Raphael Lemkin read about the trial in the news and was inspired to conceptualize the crime of genocide in international law.

== Background ==
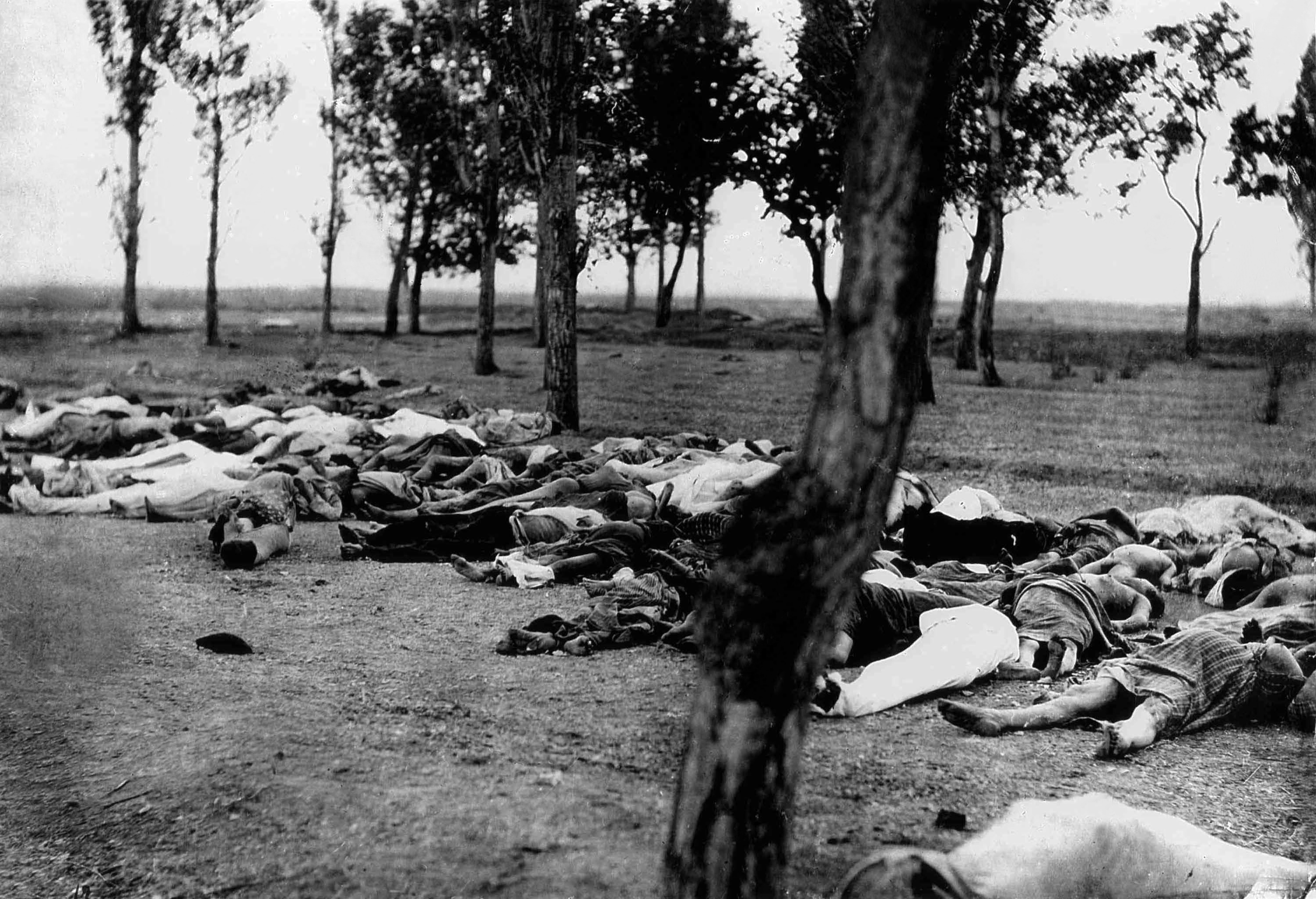
The corpses of Armenians beside a road, a common sight along deportation routes

As the leader of the Committee of Union and Progress (CUP), Talaat Pasha was the last powerful grand vizier of the Ottoman Empire during World War I. Considered the primary architect of the Armenian genocide, he ordered the deportation of nearly all of the empire's Armenian population to the Syrian Desert in 1915, to wipe them out. Of 40,000 Armenians deported from Erzurum, it is estimated that fewer than 200 reached Deir ez-Zor. When more Armenians survived than Talaat had intended, he ordered a second wave of massacres in 1916. Talaat estimated that around 1,150,000 Armenians disappeared during the genocide. In 1918, Talaat told journalist Muhittin Birgen, "I assume full responsibility for the severity applied" during the Armenian deportation and, "I absolutely don't regret my deed."

When United States ambassador Henry Morgenthau tried to persuade Talaat to discontinue the atrocities, he interrupted, saying he would not reconsider because most of the Armenians were already dead: "The hatred between the Turks and the Armenians is now so intense that we have got to finish with them. If we don't, they will plan their revenge." Talaat told Turkish writer Halide Edib that the extermination of Armenians was justified to advance Turkish national interests and that, "I am ready to die for what I have done, and I know that I shall die for it." In August 1915, after learning about the Armenian massacres, CUP former finance minister Cavid Bey predicted Talaat would be assassinated by an Armenian.

During World War I, Imperial Germany was a military ally of the Ottoman Empire. Ambassador Hans von Wangenheim approved limited removals of Armenian populations from sensitive areas. German representatives issued occasional diplomatic protests when the Ottomans went far beyond this in an attempt to contain the reputational damage from their allies' actions. Germany censored information about the genocide and undertook propaganda campaigns denying it and accusing Armenians of stabbing the Ottoman Empire in the back. Germany's inaction led to accusations that it was responsible for the genocide, which became entangled with the debate over Germany's responsibility for the war.

== Talaat Pasha's exile in Berlin ==
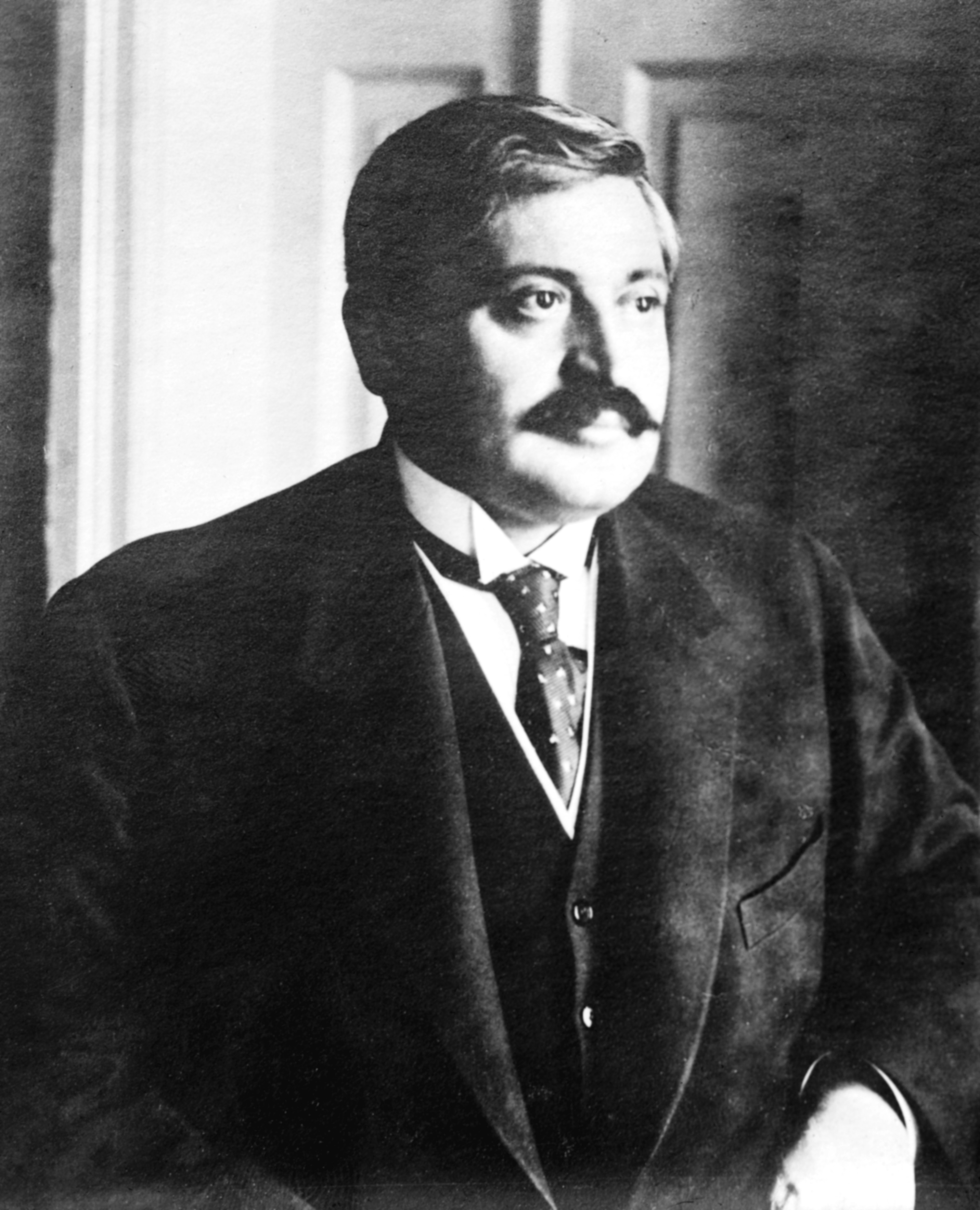
Talaat Pasha

After the Armistice of Mudros (30 October 1918), following elaborate preparations, Talaat fled Constantinople on a German torpedo boat with other CUP leaders—Enver Pasha, Djemal Pasha, Bahaeddin Şakir, Nazım Bey, Osman Bedri, and Cemal Azmi—on the night of November 1-2. Except for Djemal, all were major perpetrators of the genocide; they left to evade punishment for their crimes and to organize a resistance movement. German foreign minister Wilhelm Solf had instructed the embassy in Constantinople to aid Talaat and refused the Ottoman government's request to extradite him, on the grounds that "Talaat has been loyal to us, and our country remains open to him."

Arriving in Berlin on 10 November, Talaat stayed in a hotel in Alexanderplatz and a sanatorium in Neubabelsberg, Potsdam, before moving into a nine-room apartment at Hardenbergstraße 4, at today's Ernst-Reuter-Platz. Next to his apartment, he founded the Oriental Club where Muslims and Europeans opposed to the Entente would gather. The Foreign Office monitored the goings-on at this apartment using the former Constantinople correspondent for the Frankfurter Zeitung, Paul Weitz. A decree of the Social Democratic Party of Germany's (SPD) chancellor Friedrich Ebert legalized Talaat's residence. In 1920, Talaat's wife Hayriye joined him. The German government had intelligence that Talaat's name was first on an Armenian hit list and suggested he should stay at a secluded estate belonging to former Ottoman chief of staff Fritz Bronsart von Schellendorf in Mecklenburg. Talaat refused because he needed the capital's networks to pursue his political agitation. The CUP-initiated resistance movement eventually led to the Turkish War of Independence. Talaat initially hoped to use Turkish politician Mustafa Kemal as a puppet and directly issued orders to Turkish generals from Berlin.

Talaat had influential German friends from the beginning of his exile and acquired status over time as he was seen as a representative of the Turkish nationalist movement abroad. Using a false passport under the name Ali Saly Bey, he traveled freely throughout continental Europe despite being wanted by the United Kingdom and the Ottoman Empire for his crimes. Many German newspapers suspected his presence in Berlin, and he spoke at the press conference after the Kapp Putsch, a failed attempt to overthrow the German government in March 1920. Many Germans, but especially the far right, viewed Turkey as innocent and wronged, comparing the Treaty of Sèvres to the Treaty of Versailles and seeing a "community of destiny" between Germany and Turkey. Talaat wrote a memoir, focused primarily on defending his decision to order a genocide and absolving the CUP from any guilt. Talaat and other CUP exiles were convicted and sentenced to death in absentia for the "massacre and annihilation of the Armenian population of the Empire" by the Ottoman Special Military Tribunal on 5 July 1919.

== Operation Nemesis ==
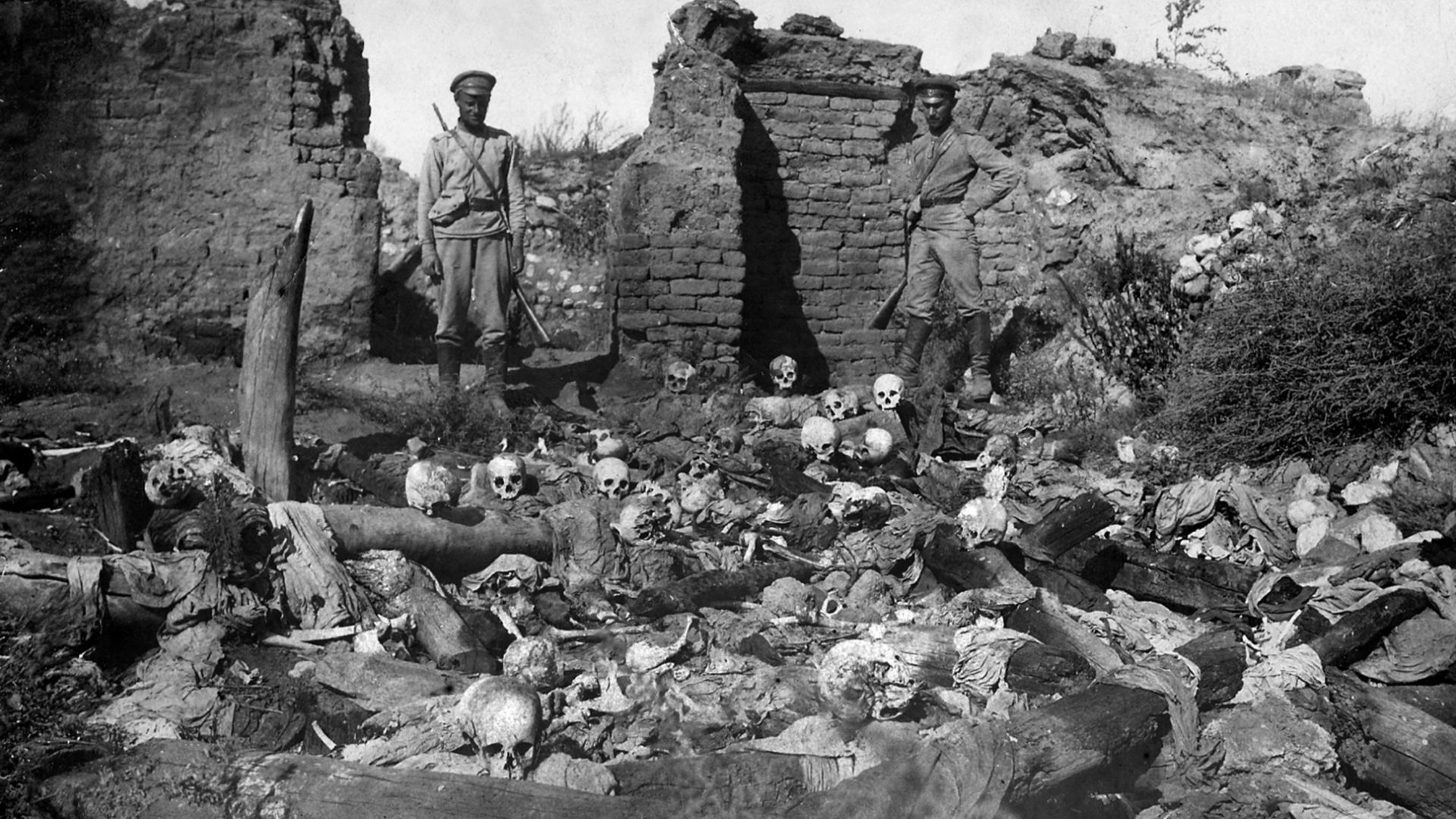
Russian soldiers pictured in the former Armenian village of Sheykhalan (modern day Eğirmeç) near Muş, 1915

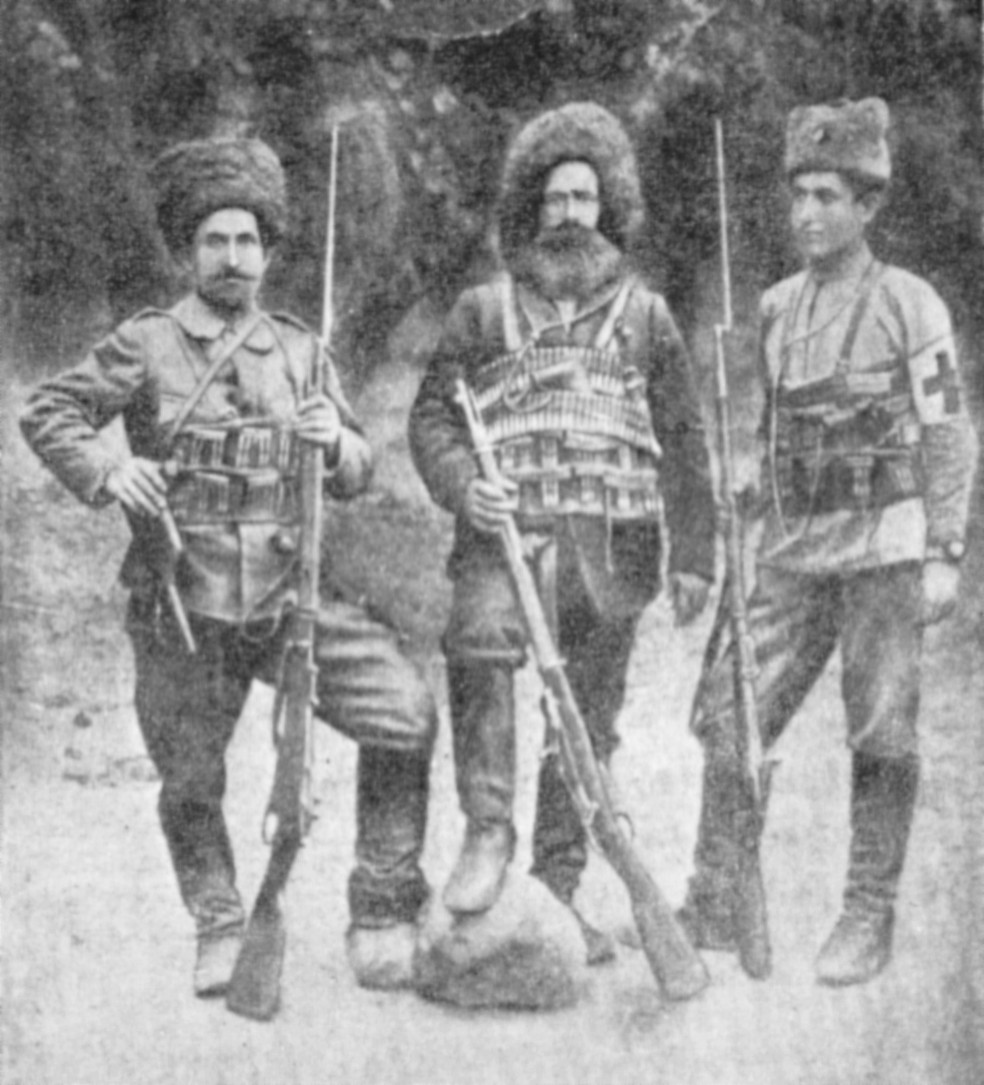
The brothers Soghomon (right), Sahak, and Misak Tehlirian as volunteers in the Russian army

After it became clear that no one else would bring the perpetrators of the genocide to justice, the Dashnaktsutyun, an Armenian political party, set up the secret Operation Nemesis, headed by Armen Garo, Shahan Natalie, and Aaron Sachaklian. The conspirators drew up a list of 100 genocide perpetrators to target for assassination; Talaat headed the list. There was no shortage of volunteers to carry out the assassinations, mainly young men who survived the genocide or lost their families. Nemesis operatives did not carry out assassinations without confirming the identity of the target and were careful to avoid accidentally killing the innocent.

One of these volunteers was Soghomon Tehlirian (1896–1960) from Erzindjan, Erzurum Vilayet, a city which had 20,000 Armenian residents before World War I and none afterwards. Tehlirian was in Serbia when war broke out. After hearing about anti-Armenian atrocities, he joined the Armenian volunteer units of the Russian army; as they advanced west, they found the aftermath of the genocide. Realizing his family had been killed, he vowed to take revenge. His memoirs list 85 family members who perished in the genocide. Tehlirian suffered from regular fainting spells and other nervous system disorders that possibly resulted from what is now called post-traumatic stress disorder; during his trial, he said they were related to his experiences during the genocide.

After the war, Tehlirian went to Constantinople, where he assassinated Harutiun Mgrditichian, who had worked for the Ottoman secret police and helped compile the list of Armenian intellectuals who were deported on 24 April 1915. This killing convinced the Nemesis operatives to entrust him with the assassination of Talaat Pasha. In mid-1920, the Nemesis organization paid for Tehlirian to travel to the United States, where Garo briefed him that the death sentences pronounced against the major perpetrators had not been carried out, and that the killers continued their anti-Armenian activities from exile. That fall, the Turkish nationalist movement invaded Armenia. Tehlirian received the photographs of seven leading CUP leaders, whose whereabouts Nemesis was tracking, and departed for Europe, going first to Paris. In Geneva, he obtained a visa to go to Berlin as a mechanical engineering student, leaving on 2 December.

The conspirators plotting assassinations met at the residence of Libarit Nazariants, vice-consul of the Republic of Armenia. Tehlirian attended these meetings even after falling ill with typhoid in mid-December. He was so ill that he collapsed while tracking Şakir and had to rest for a week. The Dashnak Central Committee ordered them to focus on Talaat to the exclusion of other perpetrators. At the end of February, the conspirators located Talaat after spotting him leaving from Berlin Zoologischer Garten railway station on a trip to Rome. Vahan Zakariants, posing as a man looking for lodging, investigated and was able to discover that Talaat was living at Hardenbergstraße 4. To confirm the identification, Tehlirian rented a pension across the street at Hardenbergstraße 37, where he could observe people coming and going from Talaat's apartment. His orders from Natalie stated, "You blow up the skull of the Number 1 nation-murderer and you don't try to flee. You stand there, your foot on the corpse and surrender to the police, who will come and handcuff you."

== Assassination ==
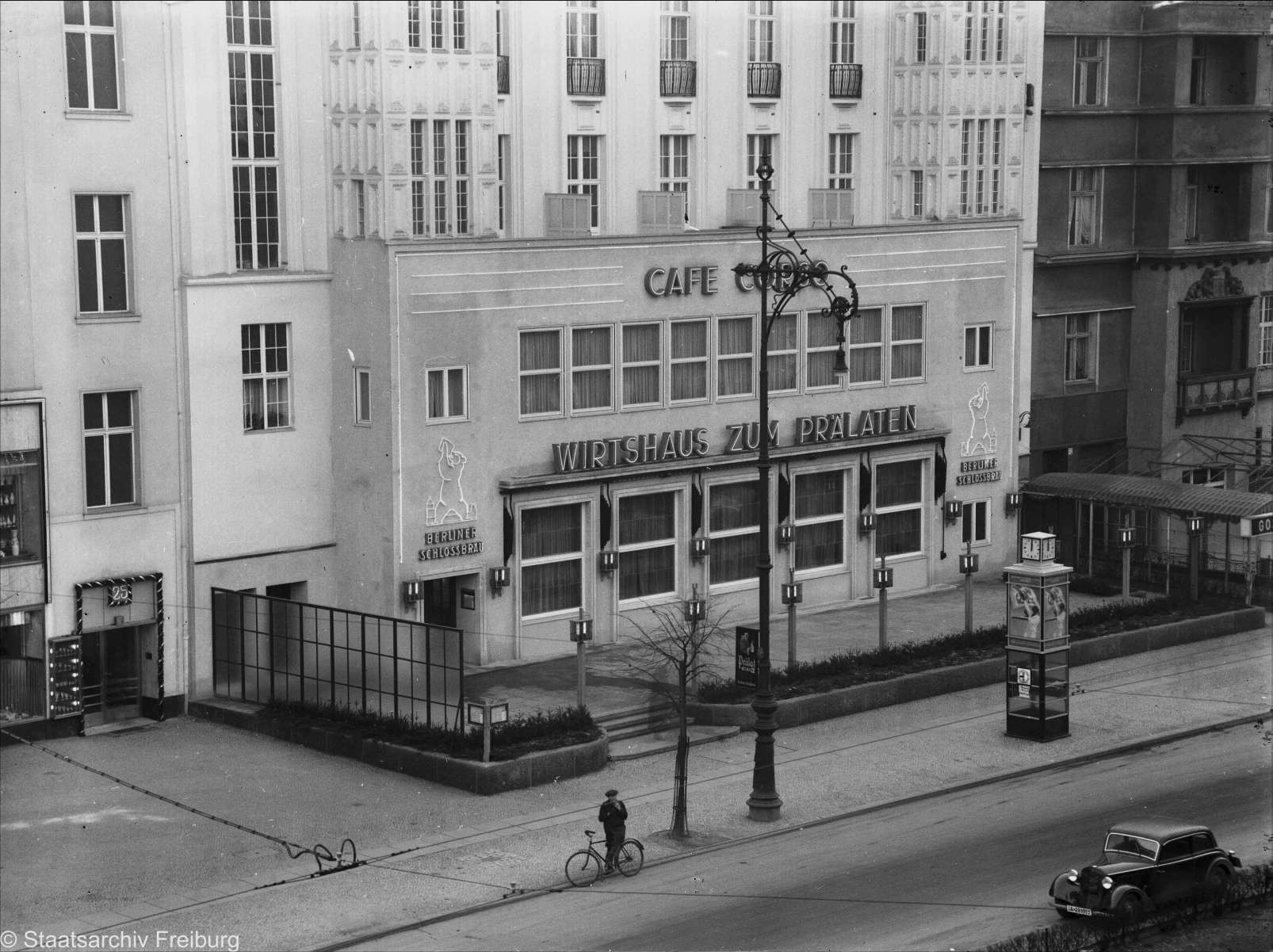
Street outside Hardenbergstraße 27, where the assassination took place. Photo from January 1936

On a rainy Tuesday (15 March 1921) around 10:45 a.m., Talaat left his apartment intending to purchase a pair of gloves. Tehlirian approached him from the opposite direction, recognized him, crossed the street, closed in from behind, and shot him at close range in the nape of his neck outside Hardenbergstraße 17, on a busy street corner, causing instant death. The bullet went through his spinal cord and exited above Talaat's left eye, having destroyed his brain; he fell forward and lay in a pool of his blood. At first Tehlirian stood over the corpse, but after onlookers shouted, he forgot his instructions and ran away. He threw away the caliber 9 mm Parabellum pistol that he used for the assassination and fled via Fasanenstraße, where he was apprehended by shop assistant Nikolaus Jessen. People in the crowd beat him severely; Tehlirian exclaimed in broken German something to the effect of, "It's ok. I am a foreigner and he is a foreigner!" Shortly afterwards, he told police, "I am not the murderer; he was."

Police cordoned off the body. Fellow CUP exile Nazım Bey arrived at the scene shortly afterwards and went to Talaat's apartment at Hardenbergstraße 4, where Ernst Jäckh, a Foreign Office official and pro-Turkish activist who often met with Talaat, arrived at 11:30 a.m. Şakir also learned of the assassination and identified the body for the police. Jäckh and Nazım returned to the scene of the assassination. Jäckh attempted to convince the police to surrender the body using his authority as a Foreign Office official, but they refused to do so before the homicide squad arrived. Jäckh complained the "Turkish Bismarck" could not remain outside in such a state for passersby to gawk at. Eventually, they received permission to transport the body, which was sent to Charlottenburg mortuary in a Red Cross vehicle. Immediately after the assassination, Şakir and Nazım received police protection. Other CUP exiles worried they would be next.

== Funeral ==
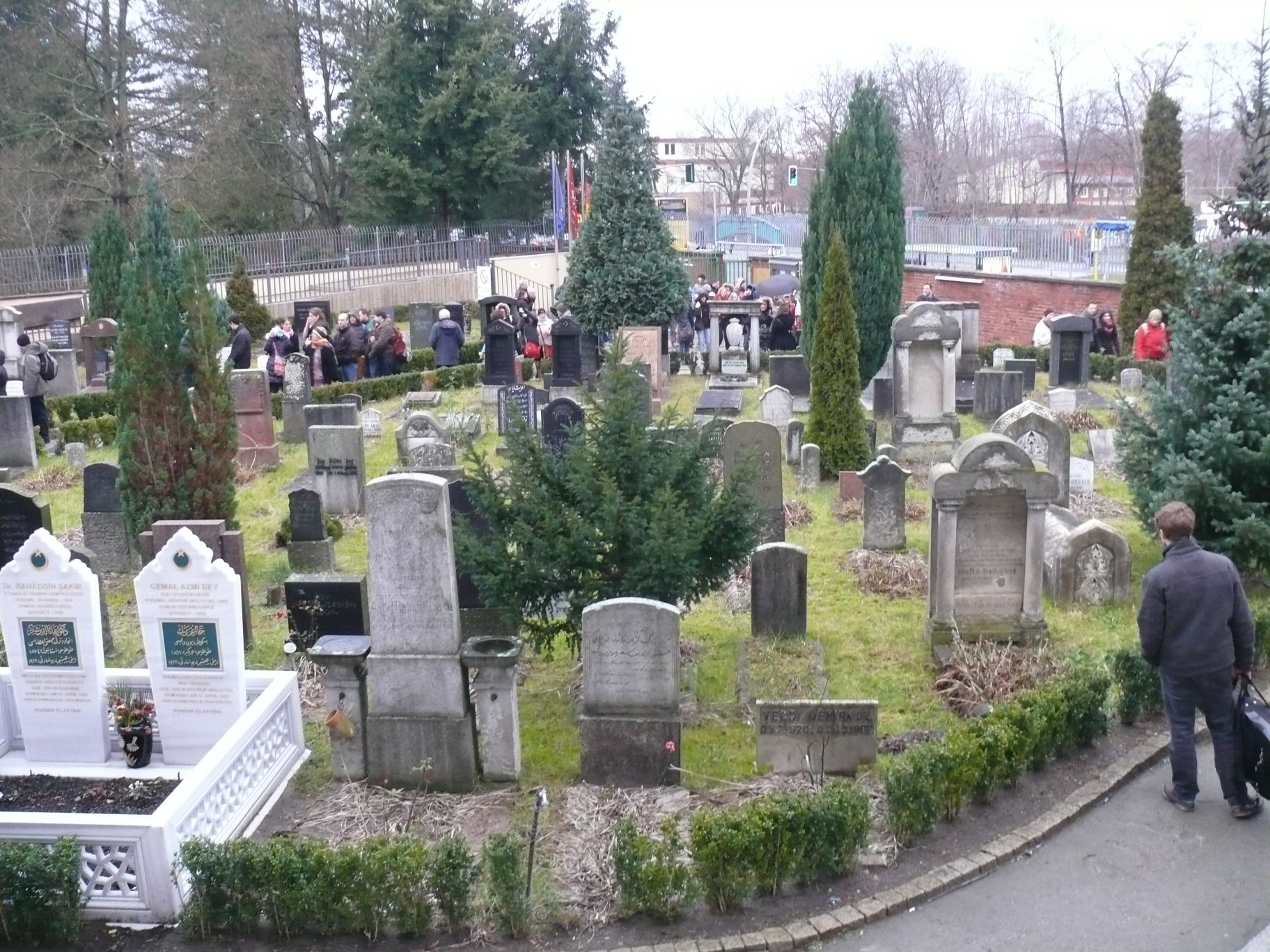
Graves honoring Armenian genocide perpetrators Bahaeddin Şakir and Cemal Azmi in the cemetery of Şehitlik Mosque in Berlin (foreground left). Both were assassinated by Nemesis operatives in 1922.

Initially, Talaat's friends hoped he could be buried in Anatolia, but neither the Ottoman government in Constantinople nor the Turkish nationalist movement in Ankara wanted the body; it would be a political liability to associate themselves with the man considered the worst criminal of World War I. Invitations from Hayriye and the Oriental Club were sent to Talaat's funeral, and on 19 March, he was buried in the Alter St.-Matthäus-Kirchhof in a well-attended ceremony. At 11:00 a.m., prayers led by the imam of the Turkish embassy, Shükri Bey, were held at Talaat's apartment. Afterwards, a large procession accompanied the coffin to Matthäus, where he was interred.

Many prominent Germans paid their respects, including former foreign ministers Richard von Kühlmann and Arthur Zimmermann, along with the former head of Deutsche Bank, the ex-director of the Baghdad railway, several military personnel who had served in the Ottoman Empire during the war and August von Platen-Hallermünde, attending on behalf of the exiled Kaiser Wilhelm II. The German foreign office sent a wreath with a ribbon saying, "To a great statesman and a faithful friend." Şakir, barely able to maintain his composure, read a funeral oration while the coffin was lowered into the grave, covered in an Ottoman flag. He asserted the assassination was "the consequence of imperialist politics against the Islamic nations".

In late April, national-liberal politician Gustav Stresemann of the German People's Party proposed a public commemoration to honor Talaat. The German-Turkish Association declined. Stresemann was well aware of the genocide and believed at least one million Armenians had been killed. Talaat's belongings ended up in the possession of Weismann, the head of Berlin's Public Security Office; his memoirs were given to Şakir who had them published.

== Trial ==
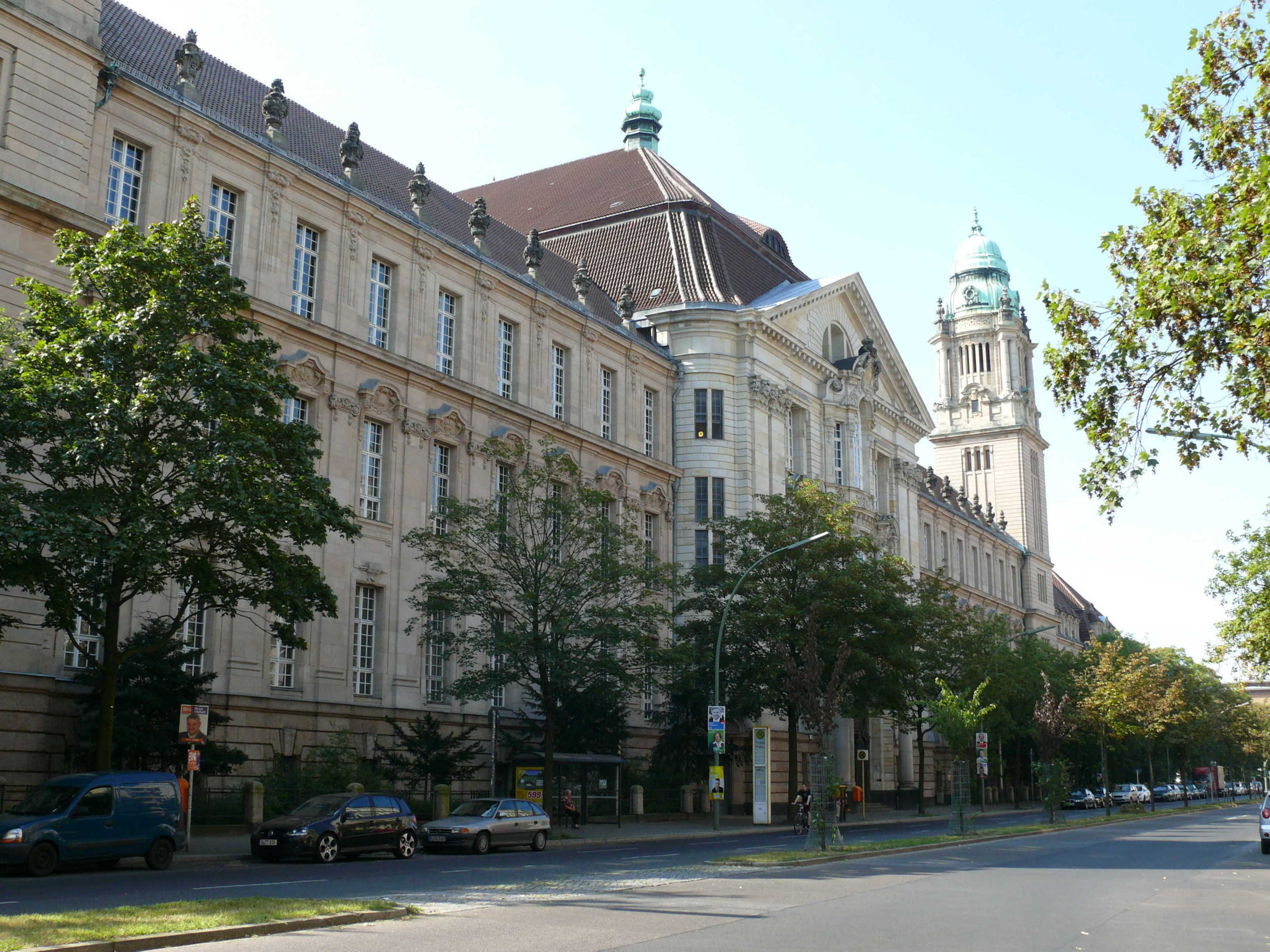
Court where Tehlirian was tried

At the beginning of the police investigation, Tehlirian was offered a Turkish-speaking interpreter, but he refused to speak Turkish. On 16 March, the police recruited an Armenian interpreter, Kevork Kaloustian, who was part of the Nemesis operation. Tehlirian admitted he had killed Talaat out of vengeance and planned the act before he came to Germany, but told police he acted alone. At his trial, Tehlirian denied the assassination was premeditated; the interpreter had refused to sign the document of interrogation on the grounds that Tehlirian's injuries incapacitated him. The preliminary investigation was concluded by 21 March.

The Dashnaktsutyun raised between 100,000 and 300,000 marks for his legal defense, mostly from Armenian Americans. Zakariants translated Tehlirian's words into German during the trial and was involved in paying bills, organizing the defense, and relaying the Dashnak Central Committee of America's instructions to Tehlirian. Kaloustian interpreted from German to Armenian. Three German lawyers—Adolf von Gordon, Johannes Werthauer, and Theodor Niemeyer, who were paid 75,000 marks each—represented Tehlirian; their prominence resulted in even more publicity for the trial. The state prosecutor was Gollnick and the judge was Erich Lemberg; twelve jurors heard the case.

The trial was held at the Moabit Criminal Court on 2–3 June. The courtroom was completely full. Many Armenians in Germany attended the trial as did some Turks, including Talaat's wife. Journalists for German and international newspapers were in attendance; the Daily Telegraph, the Chicago Daily News, and the Philadelphia Public Ledger, among many others, requested press passes. According to historian Stefan Ihrig, it "was one of the most spectacular trials of the twentieth century".

=== Defense and prosecution strategies ===
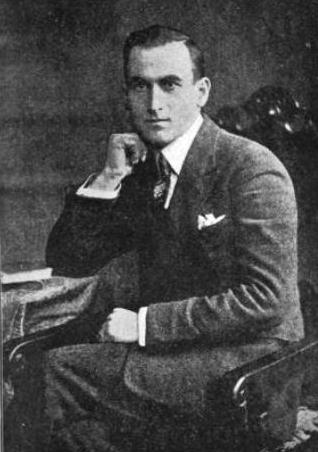
Soghomon Tehlirian in 1921

The defense strategy was to put Talaat Pasha on trial for the murder of Tehlirian's family members and the other one million Armenians whose deaths he had ordered. Natalie saw it as an opportunity to propagandize the Armenian cause. He believed that Tehlirian would likely be convicted according to German law but hoped to secure a pardon. Werthauer was more optimistic, announcing days after the assassination his certainty of achieving his client's acquittal. The Protestant missionary and activist Johannes Lepsius, who had spoken out against the killing of Armenians since 1896, worked on presenting the case against Talaat. Their strategy was successful, as the social-democratic newspaper Vorwärts noted: "In reality it was the blood-stained shadow of Talât Pasha who was sitting on the defendant's bench; and the true charge was the ghastly Armenian Horrors, not his execution by one of the few victims left alive."

To maximize the probability of acquittal, the defense presented Tehlirian as a lone vigilante, rather than an avenger of his entire nation. German police looked for Tehlirian's associates but did not uncover them. The defense tried to forge a connection between Tehlirian and Talaat through Tehlirian's mother by proving that Talaat caused her death. Along with the enormity of Talaat's crimes, the defense argument rested on Tehlirian's traumatized mental state, which could make him not liable for his actions according to the German law of temporary insanity, section 51 of the penal code.

In contrast, the German prosecution's main goal was to depoliticize the proceedings and avoid a discussion of Germany's role in the genocide. The trial was held in only one and a half days instead of the three requested by the defense, and six of the fifteen witnesses the defense called were not heard. The prosecution applied for the case to be heard in camera to minimize exposure, but the Foreign Office rejected this solution, fearing that secrecy would not improve Germany's reputation. Historian Carolyn Dean writes that the attempt to complete the trial quickly and positively portray Germany's actions during the war "inadvertently transformed Tehlirian into a symbol of human conscience tragically compelled to gun down a murderer for want of justice."

Ihrig and other historians have argued the prosecutor's strategy was deeply flawed, indicating either his incompetence or a lack of motivation to achieve a conviction. Gollnick insisted that events in the Ottoman Empire had nothing to do with the assassination and tried to avoid the presentation of evidence on the genocide. Once the evidence was presented, he denied Talaat played a role in the Armenian atrocities and was ultimately obliged to justify the orders that Talaat sent. Before the trial, Hans Humann, who controlled the anti-Armenian Deutsche Allgemeine Zeitung newspaper, lobbied the prosecutor's office intensely. Although he had access to Talaat Pasha's memoirs, the prosecutor did not enter them into evidence at the trial. Ihrig speculates Gollnick was disgusted by Humann's lobbying and perhaps even sympathized with the defendant. After the trial, Gollnick was appointed to the editorial board of Deutsche Allgemeine Zeitung.

=== Tehlirian's testimony ===
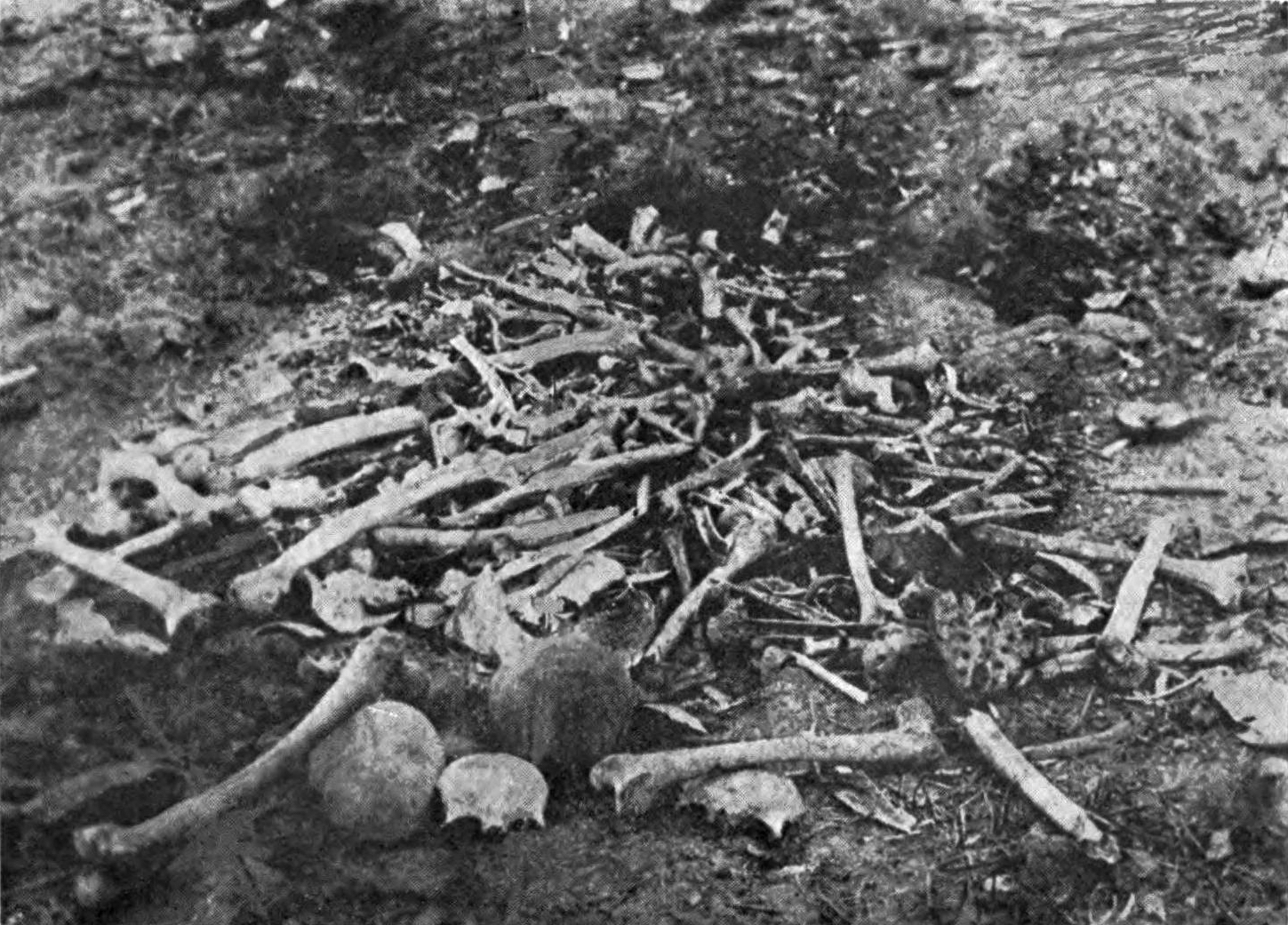
Result of Armenian massacres in Erzindjan

The trial opened with the judge asking Tehlirian many questions about the genocide, which revealed the judge's knowledge of the genocide and Turkish and German narratives about it. He asked Tehlirian to recount what he witnessed during the events. Tehlirian said that after the outbreak of war, most Armenian men in Erzindjan were conscripted into the army. In early 1915, some Armenian community leaders were arrested and reports of their massacre reached the city. In June 1915, a general deportation order was given, and armed gendarmes forced Armenians in the city to abandon their homes and leave their property behind. As soon as they left the city, the gendarmes began to shoot the victims and loot their valuables. Tehlirian said, "one of the gendarmes carried off my sister," but did not continue, stating, "I would rather die now than to speak about this dark day again." After prodding from the judge, he recalled how he witnessed the murder of his mother and brother and was then knocked unconscious, awaking underneath his brother's corpse. He never saw his sister again. After this, Tehlirian said, he found shelter with several Kurds before escaping into Persia with other survivors.

Tehlirian was asked whom he held responsible for instigating the massacres and about historical precedents such as the Adana massacre. Only then did the judge read out the charges of premeditated murder. Asked if he was guilty, Tehlirian said "no", despite having initially admitted to having carried out the assassination. He explained, "I do not consider myself guilty because my conscience was clear ... I have killed a man, but I am not a murderer." Tehlirian denied having a plan to kill Talaat, but said that two weeks before the killing, he had a vision: "the images from the massacre came in front of my eyes again and again. I saw the corpse of my mother. This corpse stood up and came up to me and said: 'You saw that Talât is here and you are totally indifferent? You are no longer my son!'" At this point, he said that he "suddenly woke up and decided to kill" Talaat. After further questioning, he denied knowing that Talaat was in Berlin and reiterated that he had no plan to kill the Ottoman official, appearing confused. The judge intervened in favor of Tehlirian after further probing from the prosecutor, saying that "there had been changes in his [Tehlirian's] resolve".

The testimony was false: Tehlirian was actually fighting with the Armenian volunteers in the Russian army at the time his family was killed. Historian Rolf Hosfeld says Tehlirian "was extremely well groomed" and his testimony was highly believable. Historian Tessa Hofmann says that, while false, Tehlirian's testimony featured "extremely typical and essential elements of the collective fate of his compatriots". The prosecution did not challenge the veracity of the testimony, and the truth was not uncovered until decades later. During the trial, Tehlirian was never asked if he belonged to an Armenian revolutionary group or if he committed the assassination as part of a conspiracy. Had the court known that the assassination was part of a premeditated conspiracy, Hosfeld argues, Tehlirian would not have been acquitted.

=== Other testimony on the genocide ===
The court then heard from the police officers and the coroner as witnesses to the assassination and its aftermath, as well as Tehlirian's two landladies, before calling upon Armenians who had interacted with Tehlirian in Berlin. These witnesses gave information on the Armenian genocide. Levon Eftian told the court that his family was in Erzurum during the genocide and both his parents were killed, but other relatives managed to flee. Tehlirian's interpreter, Zakariants, also testified later that day, saying that he lost his father, mother, grandfather, brother, and uncle during the 1890s Hamidian massacres. Mr. Terzibashian, an Armenian tobacconist in Berlin, testified that all his friends and relatives who had been in Erzurum during the genocide were killed.

==== Christine Terzibashian ====
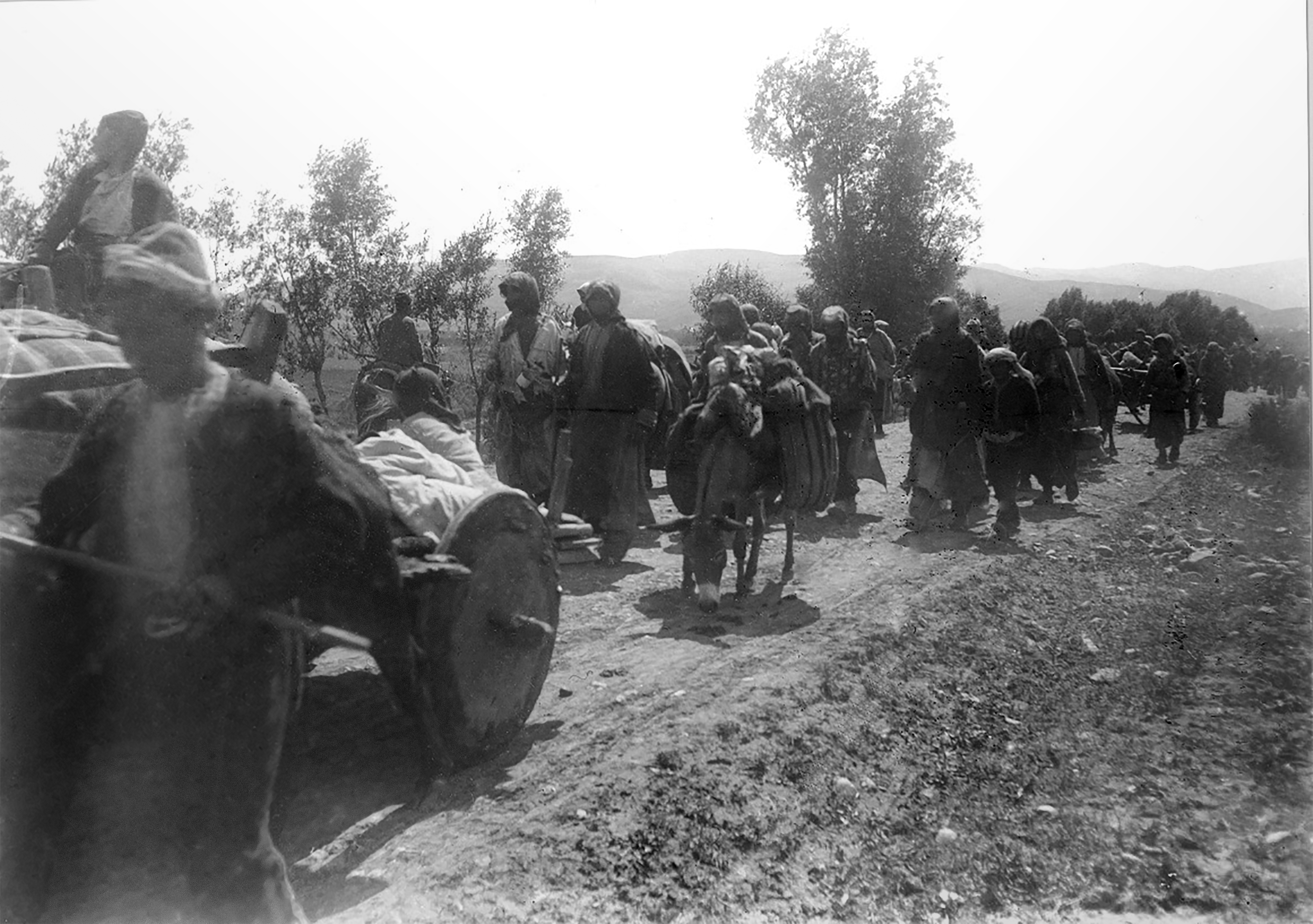
Armenian deportees in Erzurum, photographed by Viktor Pietschmann

Christine Terzibashian, the tobacconist's wife, said she knew nothing of the assassination. The defense asked her to testify about the Armenian genocide, and the judge allowed this. She was also from Erzurum and said that of her twenty-one relatives, only three survived. She said Armenians were forced to leave Erzurum toward Erzindjan in four groups of five hundred families. They had to walk over the corpses of other Armenians who had been killed earlier. She testified that after they had reached Erzindjan the men were separated from the rest of the deportees, tied together and thrown into the river. She explained the rest of the men were axed to death in the mountains above Malatia and thrown in the water.

Afterwards, Terzibashian recalled, "the gendarmes came and picked out the most beautiful women and girls" and that any who refused were "impaled with bayonets and their legs were ripped apart". She recalled that the killers would cut open pregnant women to kill their children. This caused great stir in the courtroom. She stated that her brother was killed and her mother immediately died. When she refused to marry one of the Turks, "he took my child and threw it away". After recounting more gruesome details, she said the truth was even worse than she could relate. Asked whom she held responsible for these massacres, she stated, "It happened on Enver Pasha's orders and the soldiers forced the deportees to kneel and shout: 'Long live the pasha!'" The defense said that other witnesses, including two German nurses in Erzindjan, corroborated her account. Thus, Gordon argued, Tehlirian's account was also "true to the core".

==== Expert witnesses ====
Two expert witnesses were heard on the veracity of the previous testimony, which the prosecutor also agreed to hear. Lepsius testified that the deportation was ordered by the "Young Turk Committee", including Talaat Pasha. Lepsius quoted from an original document from Talaat regarding Armenian deportations: "the destination of the deportations is nothingness" (Das Verschickungsziel ist das Nichts) and gave details about how this was carried out in practice. Lepsius noted that, despite the official excuse of "preventative measures", "authoritative figures openly admitted in private that this was about the annihilation of the Armenian people". Mentioning the collection of Foreign Office documents he edited, Germany and Armenia, Lepsius stated that hundreds more similar testimonies existed like those heard by the court; he estimated one million Armenians were killed overall.

German general Otto Liman von Sanders acknowledged that the CUP government ordered the Armenian deportations, but also offered excuses and justifications for the deportation, claiming it occurred because of military necessity and the advice of the "highest military authorities"; he did not acknowledge that these high-ranking military officers were mostly Germans. Unlike other witnesses, Liman von Sanders said he did not know if Talaat was personally responsible for the genocide.

==== Grigoris Balakian ====
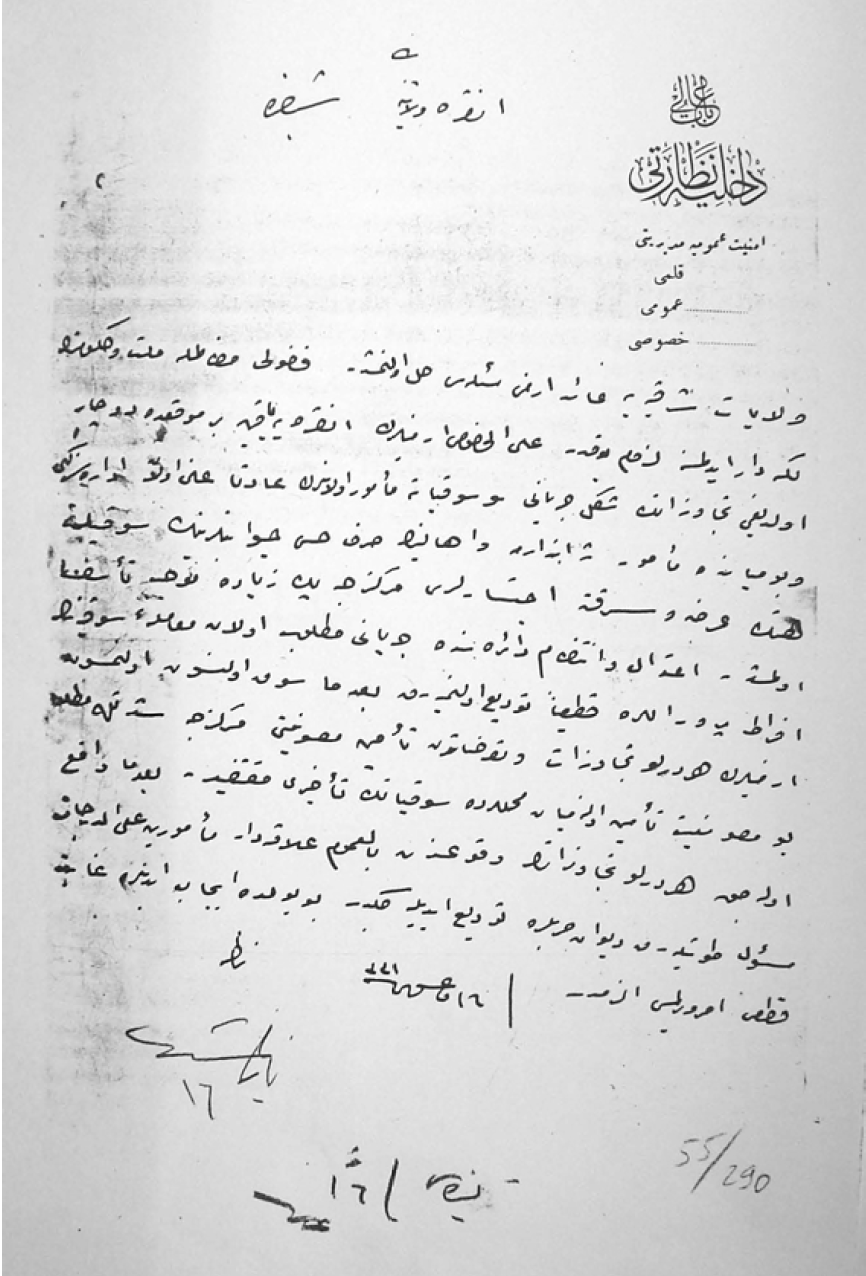
Cable sent by Talaat Pasha on 29 August 1915: "The Armenian question in the Eastern Provinces has been resolved. There's no need to sully the nation and the government with further atrocities."

Next to testify was the Armenian priest Grigoris Balakian, one of those deported on 24 April, who had come from Manchester, England. He described how most of the members of his convoy were beaten to death in Ankara. "The official name was 'deportation,' but in reality it was a systematic policy of annihilation", he stated, explaining:

Getting near to Yozgad about four hours from the town, we saw, in a valley hundreds of heads with long hair, heads of women and girls. The chief of the gendarmes in our escort was named Shukri. I said to him, "I thought that only the men were killed." No, he said, "if we killed only the men, but not the women and girls, in fifty years, there would again be several million Armenians. We must therefore eliminate the women and children in order to settle it once and for all, at home and abroad."

Shukri explained that, unlike in the Hamidian massacres, this time the Ottomans took steps that "no witness would ever reach any court". He said he could speak freely to Balakian because he would die of starvation in the desert. Shukri said he had ordered that 40,000 Armenians be clubbed to death. After a while, Gordon interrupted, asking Balakian about telegrams from Talaat. Balakian said he had seen such a telegram sent to Asaf Bey, vice-governor of Osmaniye in Cilicia, which read: "Please telegraph us promptly how many of the Armenians are already dead and how many still alive. Minister of the Interior, Talât". Asaf told Balakian that it meant, "What are you waiting for? Begin the massacres [immediately]!" Balakian said that Germans working for the Baghdad railway saved his life. He said Armenians, correctly, held Talaat responsible for the massacres.

==== Witnesses and evidence not heard ====
The defense wanted to read into evidence several of the Talaat Pasha telegrams collected by Armenian journalist Aram Andonian to prove Talaat's culpability for the genocide. Andonian came to Berlin prepared to testify and brought several of the original telegrams, which have since been lost. The defense asked the former German consul in Aleppo, Walter Rössler, to testify, but his superiors in the Foreign Office prevented him from doing so after he told them he would testify that he believed Talaat had "wanted and systematically carried out the annihilation of the Armenians". The Foreign Office worried Rössler would expose German knowledge of, and complicity in, the genocide. At the request of the defense lawyers, Rössler examined Andonian's telegrams and concluded that they were most likely authentic. Andonian did not testify, and his telegrams were not entered into evidence, because the prosecutor objected on the grounds that there was no doubt that Tehlirian held Talaat responsible. Eventually, the defense withdrew its request to present more evidence on Talaat's guilt; by this time, the jurors had already become focused on Talaat's guilt rather than Tehlirian's.

Talaat's telegrams were discussed in press coverage, including that by The New York Times. Other witnesses who had been called but were not heard included Bronsart von Schellendorff, soldiers Ernst Paraquin and Franz Carl Endres, medic Armin T. Wegner, and Max Erwin von Scheubner-Richter, who witnessed the genocide as vice-consul in Erzurum.

=== Mental state ===
Five expert witnesses testified about Tehlirian's mental state and whether it absolved him from criminal responsibility for his actions according to German law; all agreed that he suffered from regular bouts of "epilepsy" due to what he experienced in 1915. According to Ihrig, none of the doctors had a clear understanding of Tehlirian's condition, but their understanding sounded similar to the later disease of post-traumatic stress disorder. Dr. Robert Stoermer testified first, stating that in his opinion, Tehlirian's crime was a deliberate, premeditated killing and did not stem from his mental state. According to Hugo Liepmann, Tehlirian had become a "psychopath" because of what he witnessed in 1915 and therefore was not fully responsible for his actions. Neurologist and professor Richard Cassirer testified that "emotional turbulence was the root cause of his condition", and that "affect epilepsy" completely changed his personality. Edmund Forster said that traumatic experiences during the war did not cause new pathologies, merely revealed those that already existed, but agreed Tehlirian was not responsible for his action. The last expert, Bruno Haake, also diagnosed "affect epilepsy" and completely ruled out the possibility that Tehlirian was able to formulate the action of his own free will.

=== Closing arguments ===
All the witnesses were heard on the first day. At 9:15 a.m. on the second day, the judge addressed the jury, stating they needed to answer the following questions: "[First, is] the defendant, Soghomon Tehlirian, guilty of having killed, with premeditation, another human being, Talât Pasha, on 15 March 1921, in Charlottenburg?... Secondly, did the defendant carry out this killing with reflection? ... Thirdly, are there any mitigating circumstances?"

Gollnick gave only a brief closing argument; his speech took up six pages in the trial transcript compared to thirty-five for the defense. He argued Tehlirian was guilty of premeditated murder (as opposed to manslaughter, which carried a lesser sentence) and demanded the death penalty. Political hatred and vindictiveness, Gollnick argued, fully explained the crime. Tehlirian plotted the killing long in advance, traveling from the Ottoman Empire to Berlin, renting a room across the street from his intended victim, carefully observing Talaat, and finally killing him. He emphasized Liman von Sanders' evidence, arguing he was more reliable than Lepsius, and distorting what the German general actually said. Appealing to the stab-in-the-back myth about German defeat in the war, Gollnick argued that the "dislocation" of Armenians was carried out because they "conspired with the Entente and were determined, as soon as the war situation allowed, to stab the Turks in the back and to achieve their independence". Arguing there was no evidence of Talaat's responsibility in the massacres, he questioned the reliability of the documents presented at the trial and the objectivity of the tribunal that had sentenced Talaat to death. At the end of his speech, he emphasized Talaat Pasha's patriotism and honor.

Of the defense attorneys, Gordon spoke first, accusing Gollnick of being "a defense attorney for Talât Pasha". He argued in favor of the evidence linking Talaat to the commission of the genocide, particularly telegrams. Such a large-scale extermination of one million Armenians, he maintained, could not have taken place without the coordination of the central government. Furthermore, the defense noted that "deliberation" (Überlegung) in German case law refers to the time at which the decision to kill is made, excluding other preparations. A planned act cannot be murder if at the moment of its execution there was no deliberation.

Werthauer said that Talaat served in a "militarist cabinet"; defining "militarist" as one who opposes justice and ignores the law where it cannot be "brought into 'harmony' with 'military necessities'". Werthauer declared the Allied occupation of the Rhineland and the Bolsheviks were also "militarist" governments. He drew a dramatic contrast between these "militarists", and Tehlirian, a noble figure whom he compared to William Tell: "Of all the juries in the world, which one would have condemned Tell if he had shot his arrow at [the tyrant Albrecht] Gessler? Is there a more humanitarian act than that which has been described in this courtroom?" Along with arguing that Tehlirian's act was compulsively committed, the defense maintained that it was also just.

Both the prosecution and the defense stressed the difference between German and Turkish behavior during the genocide. Werthauer argued Talaat had been living in Berlin without the knowledge of the German government. Niemeyer said exoneration "would put an end to the misconception the world has of us" that Germany was responsible for the genocide.

=== Verdict ===
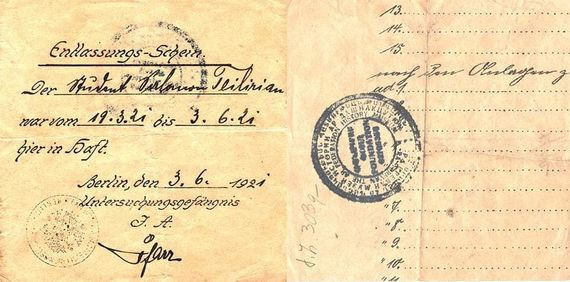
Soghomon Tehlirian's release from prison

After the closing arguments were delivered, the judge asked Tehlirian if he had anything to add; he declined. The jury deliberated for an hour before answering the question of whether Tehlirian was guilty of deliberately killing Talaat with one word: "No". A unanimous verdict, it left no possibility of appeal by the prosecution. The audience burst into applause. The state treasury bore the cost of the proceedings—306,484 marks. Gollnick said that the acquittal was based on temporary insanity. Ihrig says "the jury did not necessarily find Tehlirian innocent because of 'temporary insanity'"; he notes that the defense focused more on the political rather than medical aspects of Tehlirian's act.

Following his acquittal, Tehlirian was deported from Germany. He went to Manchester with Balakian, and then to the United States under the false name "Saro Melikian", where the editorial board of Hairenik honored him. He continued to be ill and needed medical treatment for his stress disorder. He settled in Belgrade, Serbia, where he lived until 1950. Transcripts of the trial, which were purchased by many Armenians around the world, were sold to recoup the cost of Tehlirian's defense and raise money for the Nemesis operation.

== Press coverage ==
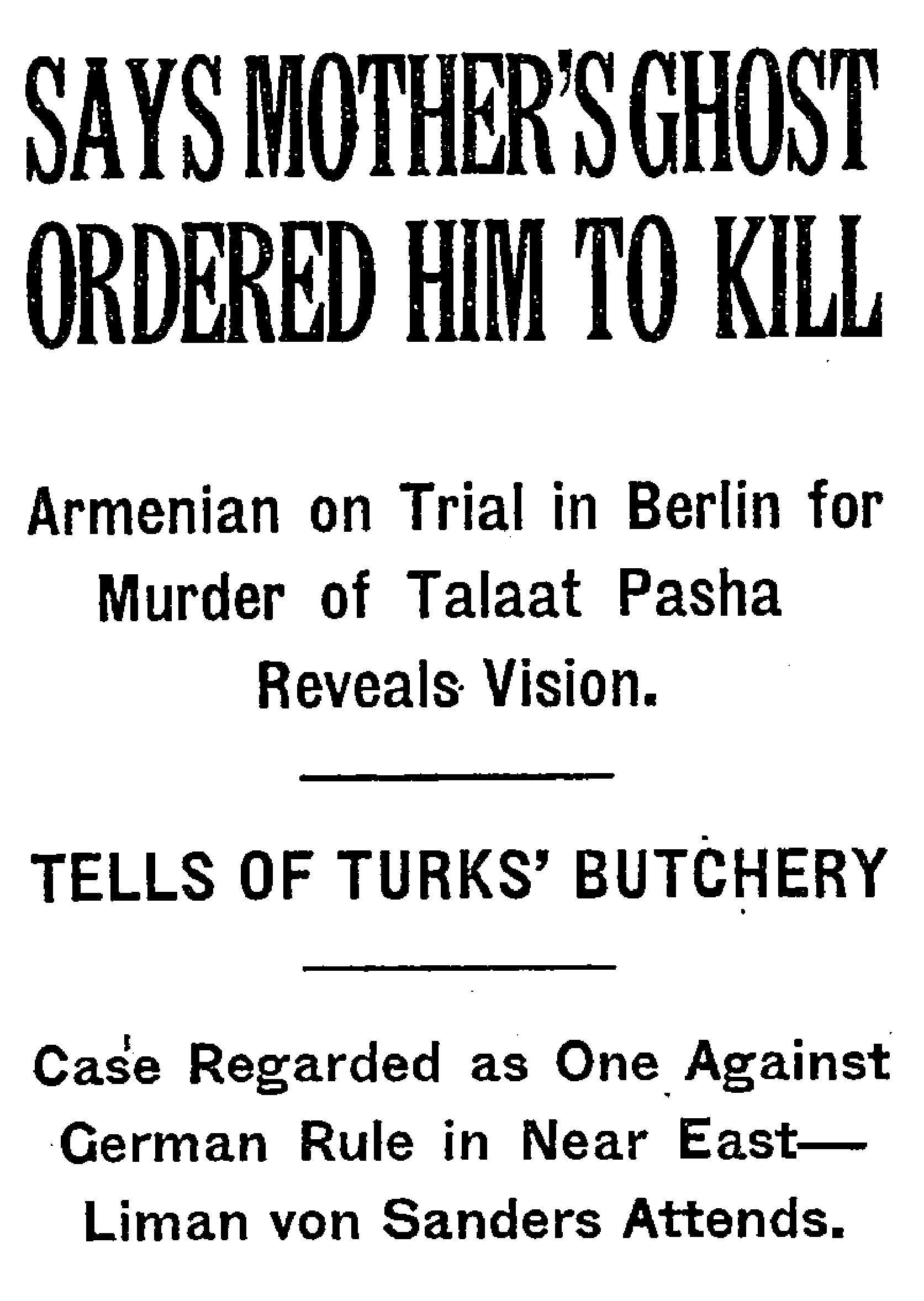
Coverage of the trial in The New York Times

The assassination and trial received widespread international press coverage and brought attention and recognition to the facts of the genocide. Contemporaries understood the trial to be more about the Armenian genocide than Tehlirian's personal guilt. News coverage reflected the tension between public sympathy for the Armenian victims of genocide and the value of law and order. The New York Times noted the jury faced a dilemma; by acquitting, they would condemn the Armenian atrocities, but also sanction extralegal killing: "This dilemma cannot be escaped: all assassins should be punished; this assassin should not be punished. And there you are!" Overall, reactions to the acquittal were favorable.

=== Germany ===
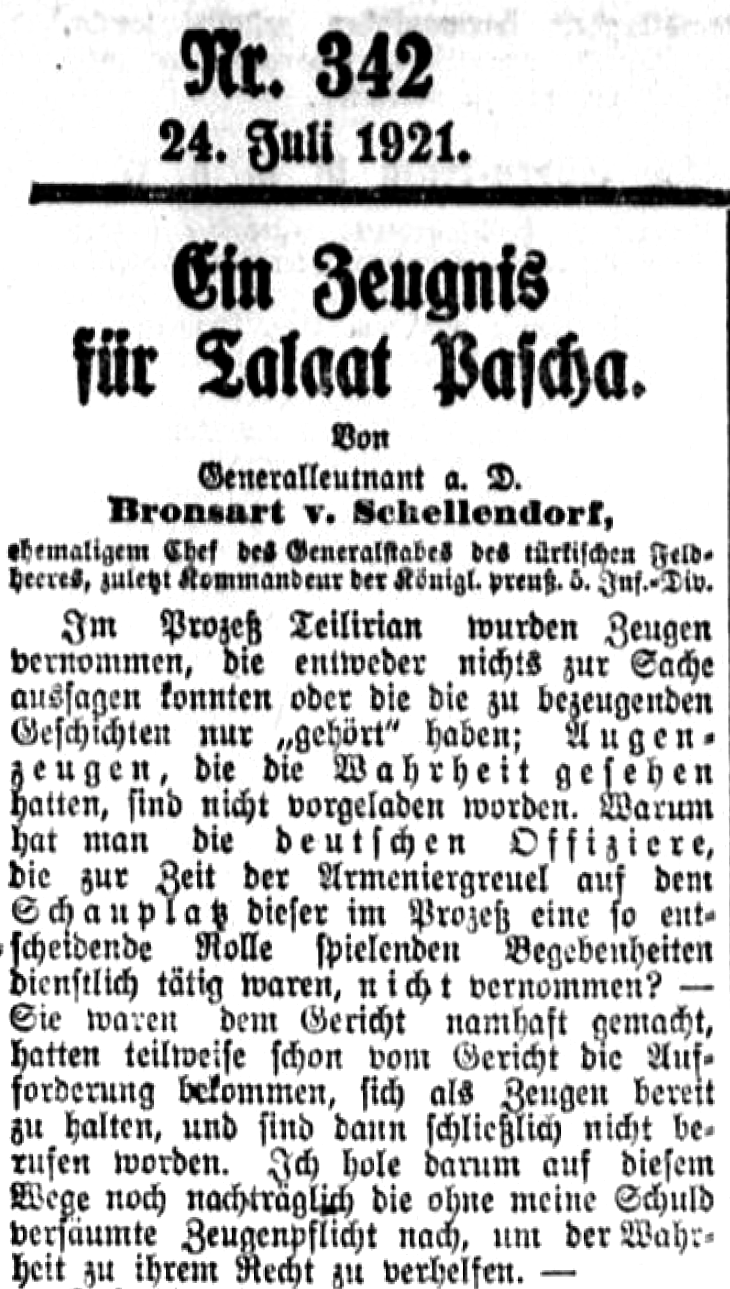
"A Tribute for Talaat Pasha" by Bronsart von Schellendorff in Deutsche Allgemeine Zeitung, claiming that Armenians were the aggressors in 1915

The assassination made the headlines of many German newspapers on the day it occurred, most coverage being sympathetic to Talaat. The next day, most newspapers in Germany reported on the assassination, and many printed obituaries. A typical example of coverage was in Vossische Zeitung, which acknowledged Talaat's role in attempting to "exterminat[e] all reachable members of the [Armenian] tribe", but advanced several justifications for the genocide. Other newspapers suggested Talaat was the wrong target for Armenian revenge. The Deutsche Allgemeine Zeitung launched an anti-Armenian campaign claiming that backstabbing and murder such as Tehlirian had carried out was "the true Armenian manner". One of the only newspapers initially sympathetic to the assassin was the Communist Freiheit.

Coverage of the trial was widespread for a month thereafter, and Tehlirian's exploit continued to be brought up in political debate until the Nazi seizure of power in 1933. Following the trial, German newspapers across the political spectrum accepted the reality of genocide. Most newspapers quoted Lepsius's and Tehlirian's testimonies extensively. German reactions to the acquittal were mixed, being generally favorable among those who were sympathetic to Armenians or universal human rights. Journalist Emil Ludwig, writing in the pacifist magazine Die Weltbühne noted, "Only when a society of nations has organized itself as the protector of international order will no Armenian killer remain unpunished, because no Turkish Pasha has the right to send a nation into the desert." A few months after the trial, Wegner published the full transcript. In the preface, he praised Tehlirian's "heroic readiness to sacrifice himself for his people", contrasting this with the lack of courage needed to order a genocide from one's desk.

On the nationalist side of opinion, which tended to be anti-Armenian, many newspapers switched from denying the genocide to justifying it, following Humann's Deutsche Allgemeine Zeitung, which published many anti-Armenian articles and called the ruling a "judicial scandal". Arguments justifying mass extermination, widely accepted by nationalist newspapers, rested on the supposed racial characteristics of Armenians, and were easily connected to theories of racial antisemitism. In 1926, Nazi ideologue Alfred Rosenberg claimed only the "Jewish press" welcomed Tehlirian's acquittal. He also claimed "the Armenians led the espionage against the Turks, similar to the Jews against Germany", thus justifying Talaat's actions against them.

=== Ottoman Empire ===
Following Talaat's assassination, Ankara newspapers praised him as a great revolutionary and reformer; Turkish nationalists told the German consul that he remained "their hope and idol". Yeni Gün stated that, "Our great patriot has died for his country. ... Talat will remain the greatest man that Turkey has produced." In Constantinople, the reaction to his death was mixed. Some paid homage to Talaat, but the liberal daily Alemdar commented that Talaat was paid back in his own coin, and "his death is the atonement for his deeds". Hakimiyet-i Milliye claimed Tehlirian confessed the British sent him. Many articles emphasized Talaat's journey from humble beginnings to the heights of power and defended his anti-Armenian policies. The Istanbul newspaper Yeni Şark serialized Talaat's memoirs in 1921. In his newspaper, published in Constantinople, Armenian socialist Dikran Zaven expressed hope that "Turks aware of the true interests of their country will not count this former minister among their good statesmen". In 1922, the Kemalist government rescinded Talaat's conviction and, two years later, passed a law granting the families of Talaat and Şakir—the two most central perpetrators of the Armenian genocide—a pension. Talaat's family also received other compensation derived from confiscated Armenian properties.

== Legacy ==
=== Turkey and Armenia ===
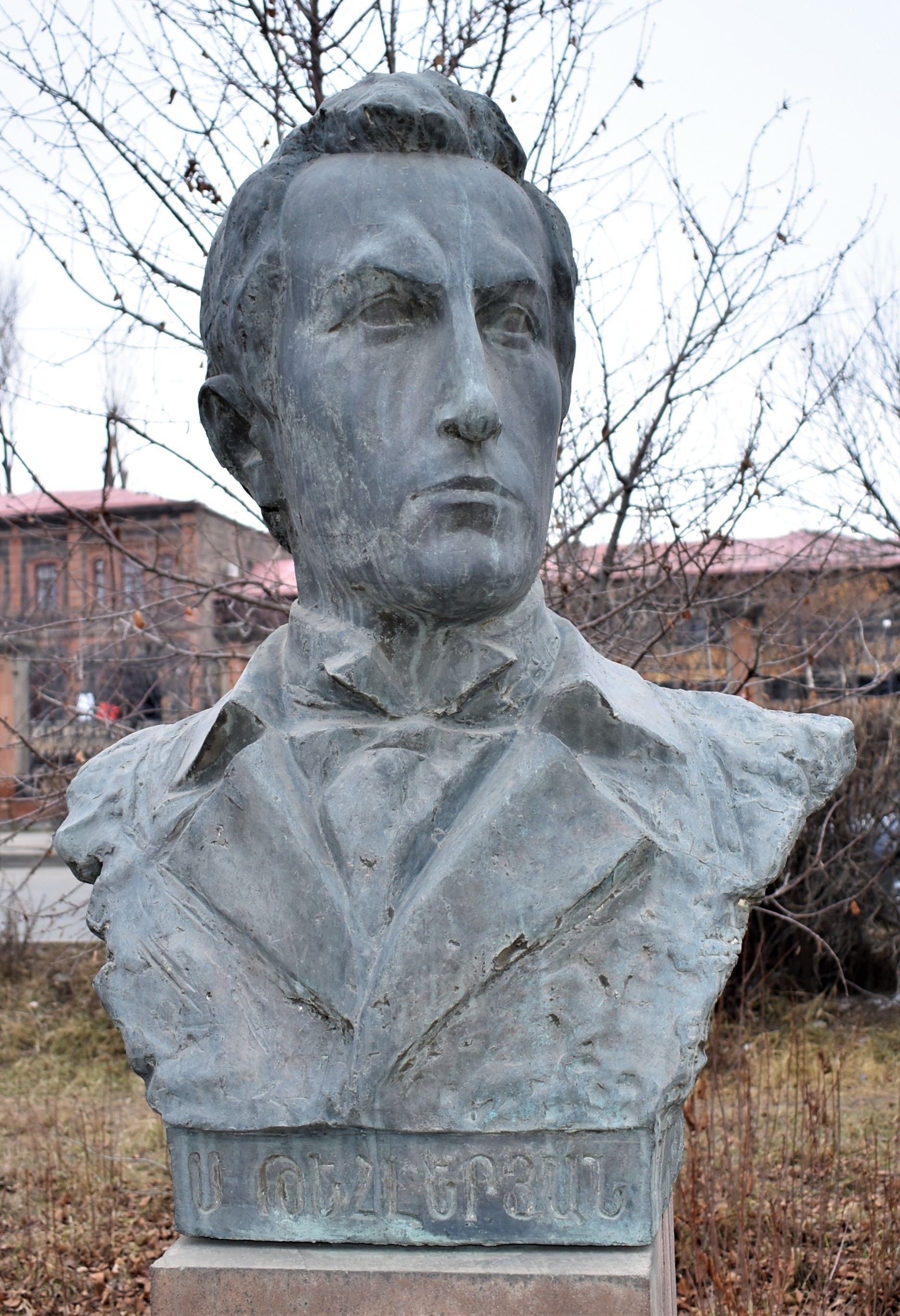
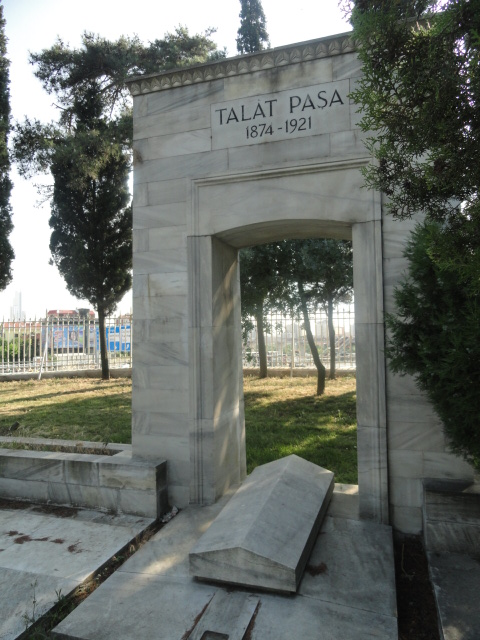
Bust of Tehlirian in Gyumri, Armenia (left). Talaat was buried in 1943 at the Monument of Liberty, Istanbul, as a national hero.

Historian Hans-Lukas Kieser states that the "assassination perpetuated the sick relationship of a victim in quest of revenge with a perpetrator entrenched in defiant denial". Both Talaat and Tehlirian are considered by their respective sides to be heroes; Alp Yenen refers to this relationship as the "Talat–Tehlirian complex".

Although considered a terrorist in Turkey, Tehlirian instantly became a hero for the Armenian cause. In the 1950s, Turkish agents tracked down Tehlirian in Casablanca and threatened his life, so he had to move to the United States. This move made Tehlirian more visible to the Armenian diaspora, although according to his son, he was reluctant to talk about his role in the assassination. After his death, a monumental grave was erected for him at Ararat Cemetery in Fresno, California. Although there is some state sponsorship from the Republic of Armenia, the memory of Tehlirian is mainly promulgated in a decentralized manner by the Armenian diaspora. In contrast, Turkish commemoration of Talaat is more state-sponsored. In 1943, at the request of the Turkish government, Talaat was exhumed and received a state funeral at the Monument of Liberty, Istanbul, originally dedicated to those who lost their lives preventing the 1909 Ottoman countercoup. The shirt that Talaat was wearing when he was assassinated is displayed at the Istanbul Military Museum. Many mosques, schools, housing developments and streets in Turkey and other countries are named after Talaat as of 2020.

Since 2005, there have been attempts by Turks in Berlin to have a memorial constructed at the site of the assassination and commemorations on 15 March at his grave. In March 2006, Turkish nationalist groups organized two rallies in Berlin intended to commemorate the assassination and protest "the lie of genocide". German politicians criticized the march, and turnout was low. In 2007, Turkish-Armenian journalist Hrant Dink was assassinated by a Turkish ultranationalist in broad daylight. Connections between the killings of Dink and Talaat have been noted by multiple authors.

=== International law ===
Polish-Jewish law student Raphael Lemkin, known for coining the word genocide in 1944, later said that reading about the Armenian genocide and Talaat's assassination sparked his interest in war crimes. Lemkin asked his professor, Julius Makarewicz, why Talaat could not be tried for his crimes in Germany. He strongly disagreed with Makarewicz that national sovereignty meant that governments could kill their own citizens en masse and it was wrong to intervene. Lemkin concluded that the assassination was just, but worried about the excesses of vigilante justice and therefore attempted to devise a legal framework for punishing genocide, resulting in the Genocide Convention.

Those who defended Sholem Schwarzbard's assassination of Ukrainian anti-Jewish pogromist Symon Petliura in 1926 cited Tehlirian's trial; a French court subsequently acquitted him. According to Dean, Tehlirian's and Schwarzbard's trials were "the first major trials in Western Europe featuring victims of interethnic violence and state-sponsored mass atrocities seeking justice". In Eichmann in Jerusalem, Hannah Arendt contrasted both cases with the later Eichmann trial, in which Israeli agents kidnapped Holocaust perpetrator Adolf Eichmann and brought him to Israel to stand trial. She noted both avengers sought a day in court to publicize the unpunished crimes committed against their peoples. Swiss lawyer Eugen Curti, defending the Jew David Frankfurter, who assassinated Swiss Nazi Wilhelm Gustloff in February 1936, cited Tehlirian's act. Curti compared the persecution of Jews in Nazi Germany to the Armenian genocide. Under pressure from Germany, Frankfurter was convicted.

Future Nuremberg trial prosecutor Robert Kempner, who attended the Tehlirian trial, believed that it was the first occasion in legal history in which it was recognized "that gross violations of human rights, and especially genocide that is committed by a government can be contested by foreign states, and that [such foreign intervention] does not constitute impermissible meddling".
