= Soghomon =

Soghomon is an Armenian given name and may refer to:

- Soghomon Tehlirian, the man who killed Talaat Pasha
- Komitas (Soghomon Gevorkevich Soghomonyan)
