= Ararat Cemetery =

Armenian Cemetery in Fresno, California

Coordinates: 36°44′44″N 119°50′04″W

Ararat Massis Armenian Cemetery
- Interactive map of Ararat Massis Armenian Cemetery

Details
- Established: 1885
- Location: Fresno, California
- Country: United States
- Website: araratarmeniancemetery.org
- Find a Grave: Ararat Massis Armenian Cemetery

The Ararat Massis Armenian Cemetery, commonly known as the Ararat Cemetery, is an Armenian cemetery in Fresno, California, United States. Established in 1885, the cemetery is the burial place of many prominent figures of Armenian-American history, including Soghomon Tehlirian, Victor Maghakian, and William Saroyan. The Ararat Massis Cemetery was the only Armenian cemetery built outside Armenia and the Middle East for more than a century.

== History ==
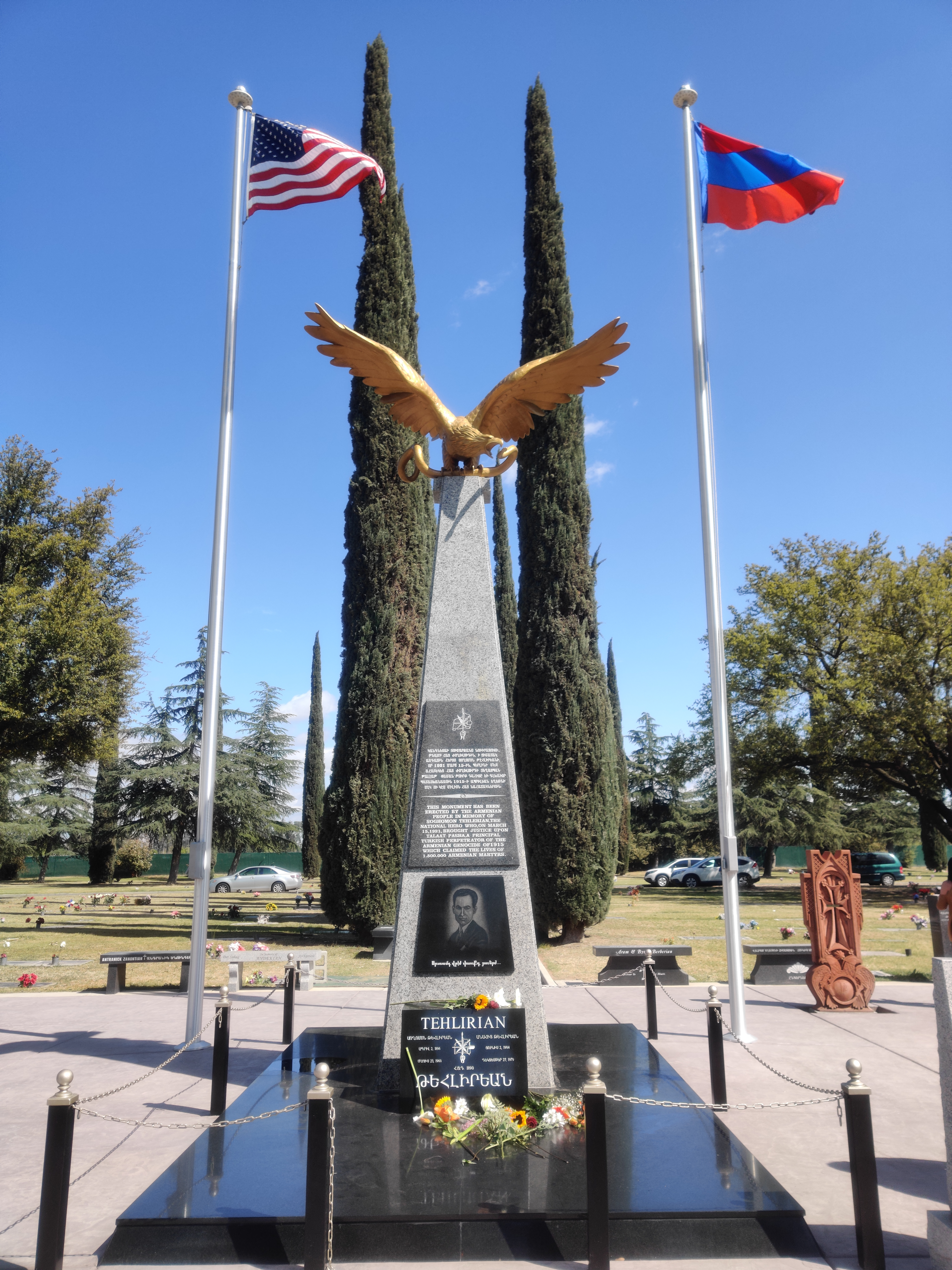
The Soghomon Tehlirian Monument in Ararat Cemetery

The cemetery was established in 1885 at the southeast corner of Belmont and Hughes avenues, west of Fresno on land granted by Moses J. Church on December 2, 1885. Church donated twenty acres to the Armenian community, but community leaders believed that they needed only ten acres. Later the community had to buy additional land. It is believed that Mary Papazian, the second Armenian to die in Fresno, was the first to be buried there.

On June 9, 1919, the Ararat Cemetery Association was established. A fire in 1930 destroyed many of Ararat Cemetery records. In 1956, with the efforts of the association, the cemetery expanded by acquiring a 2-acre (0.81 ha) parcel of land beside the existing. In 1969, further expansion was done and the cemetery was renamed Ararat Massis Cemetery.

The cemetery features a memorial dedicated to the victims of the Armenian genocide. The memorial includes bones from unknown victims brought over from Der Zor, Syria. The cemetery also features a memorial to Moses J. Church, the donor of the property.

== Notable burials ==
- Victor Maghakian (1915–1977), recipient of the Navy Cross during World War II
- Andranik Ozanian (1865–1927), military commander and statesman (he was re-buried in Pere Lachaise, Paris in 1928 and finally to Yerablur, Armenia in 2000)
- Alma Rubens (1897–1931), actress
- Lucy Saroyan (1946–2003), actress
- William Saroyan (1908–1981), dramatist and author
- Soghomon Tehlirian (1896–1960), Armenian Genocide survivor who assassinated the former Ottoman Interior Minister Talaat Pasha
