= Victor Maghakian =

United States Marine Corps captain

- Վիգդոր Մաղաքեան
- Born: December 30, 1915; Chicago, Illinois, U.S.
- Died: August 17, 1977 (aged 61); Fresno, California, U.S
- Burial place: Armenian Ararat Cemetery; 36.74559°N 119.834365°W
- Military career
- Allegiance: United States
- Branch: United States Marine Corps
- Service years: 1936–1939; 1942–1946
- Rank: Captain
- Nickname: Transport
- Service number: 251055
- Unit: Second Marine Raider Battalion
- Conflicts: Sino-Japanese War; World War II; Makin Island raid; Guadalcanal Campaign; Battle of Kwajalein; Battle of Eniwetok; Battle of Tinian; Battle of Saipan
- Awards: Navy Cross; Silver Star (2); Bronze Star (2); Purple Heart (2)
- Other work: Hotel executive; security consultant

Captain Victor "Transport" Maghakian (Armenian: Վիգդոր Մաղաքեան; December 30, 1915 – August 17, 1977) was an Armenian-American member of the United States Marine Corps during World War II. As a gunnery sergeant, he led his platoon through some of the bloodiest fighting in seven South Pacific campaigns, including the Naval Battle of Guadalcanal. Having received over two dozen medals and awards, he is considered one of the most decorated American Marines of the war.

Maghakian served with the 2nd and 4th Marine Divisions and the Raiders. During the Makin Island raid, Maghakian led the charge onto the beachhead with a landing force and fought while suffering a forearm wound. He was awarded with the Navy Cross for his efforts during the raid. Although he was supposed to return home afterward, Maghakian requested to join the Guadalcanal campaign, and was shipped two weeks later. He was again wounded in action.

In January 1944, Maghakian volunteered to participate in another assault, against Kwajalein Atoll of the Marshall Islands, in the Battle of Kwajalein. After Kwajalein, Maghakian and the Marines landed on the Eniwetok Atoll in February 1944, and continued to capture several more islands. He took part in the Battle of Tinian and was the one who raised the American flag on the island after its capture. Maghakian was part of a Marine force that captured a Japanese aircraft field during the Battle of Saipan.

== Early life ==
Victor Maghakian was born on December 30, 1915, in Chicago, Illinois, to an Armenian family. He was the oldest of four brothers and three sisters. Maghakian's great-grandfather was a caravan driver in the Middle East and was respected for his military prowess. Maghakian's father worked in the steel mill. Victor took up much of the responsibility of raising his younger siblings. In 1930, the Maghakian family moved to San Diego, California, where he originally decided to join the United States Navy. However, on the way to see the recruiter, Maghakian stopped by to watch Pride of the Marines (1936) starring Charles Bickford. After gaining inspiration from the movie, Maghakian decided not to join the Navy and instead enlist in the Marines. Having lived in San Diego for nine years, the Maghakian family moved to Fresno, California, where they lived next to the family of writer William Saroyan on the corner of M Street and Monterrey Avenue in Old Armenia Town.

== Military career ==
=== Early career ===
In 1936, after Maghakian enlisted in the Marine Corps, he was sent to Asia. He was stationed in the Philippines and China for four years. During the Sino-Japanese War (1937–1945) he was a member of the expedition force in Shanghai. After being sent to many countries, Maghakian's understanding of foreign bases and societies earned him the nickname "Transport". Other sources say however that he was nicknamed as such because he handled transportation vehicles well. In 1939, Maghakian returned to Fresno where he became a Fresno County deputy sheriff and was assigned to safeguard power installations and dams of the California Edison Company near the Sierra Nevada. Upon hearing news of the Pearl Harbor attack and America's subsequent participation in the war effort, Maghakian reenlisted in the Marine Corps on January 3, 1942. His brothers Harry and Michael also served. During his service with the 2nd and 4th Marine Divisions and the Raiders, Maghakian fought in seven major battles and was wounded three times.

=== World War II ===
During the war in 1942, Victor Maghakian immediately applied to join the Second Marine Raider Battalion under the command of Colonel Evans Carlson. Maghakian was already acquainted with Carlson during his previous service as a Marine. The Battalion was known for its tough stance on accepting only the best Marines, where only 900 out of 15,000 were accepted, Maghakian at the time being one of them.

The first mission of the battalion was to deceive the Japanese into believing that a large number of American troops were going to invade Makin Island of the Gilbert Islands. This event would later come to be known as the Makin Island raid. Out of 900 members of the battalion, Maghakian was selected as one of the 222 to participate. The raid was launched on August 17, 1942, as Maghakian led the charge onto the beachhead with a landing force but was the first casualty in this operation suffering from a forearm wound while waving his hand for instructions. As the battle continued, Maghakian wrapped up his forearm wounds and struggled to remain conscious. Nevertheless, he managed to repulse an enemy attack with a grenade and bayoneted Japanese soldiers. After receiving first aid and defying orders, he returned to the front fifteen minutes later and remained there while leading his men until directed by the Medical Officer to return to the rear. For his efforts during the raid, he was awarded with the Navy Cross by the United States Navy, the second highest military decoration for valor and extraordinary heroism in combat.

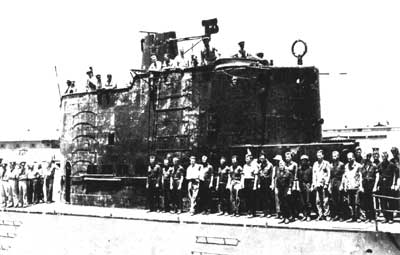
U.S. Marines arrive at Pearl Harbor, Hawaii on 26 August 1942 on board the U.S. submarine Nautilus following their raid on Makin Island

After the raid, Maghakian along with other marines received treatment at Pearl Harbor. His name was added onto a list of soldiers who were to return home. When Maghakian overheard of the plans for the campaign of Guadalcanal, he got in touch with Evans Carlson and expressed his desire to join the campaign. Within an hour, Maghakian was taken off the return list. Although his arm was still in a cast stemming from his previous injury, he was shipped to Guadalcanal two weeks later.

During the campaign, Maghakian and other Raiders were ambushed under hostile sniper and machine gun fire by Japanese troops. One of the machine gunners managed to mortally wound Maghakian's companion, Jack Miller. Maghakian then stood up and exposed himself so that the enemy soldiers would come out of their hiding spots. As the Japanese soldiers appeared, they were gunned down by the Raiders. Maghakian was wounded once more in the wrist, and the watch he was wearing became embedded in his skin and bone.

After the campaign, Maghakian returned to the mainland and spent two months in a navy hospital in Oakland, California. During this time, he married his wife Vera Karaoglanian (June 29, 1916 – March 20, 1984).

In January 1944, Maghakian volunteered to participate in another assault, that of one against Kwajalein Atoll of the Marshall Islands in what would be called the Battle of Kwajalein. On January 31, the Marine Corps landed on the island and within an hour managed to kill 18 Japanese soldiers and take two prisoners. Maghakian is credited for killing the last five enemy soldiers who were encamped in a trench in the northernmost point of the islet. Remarking on the attack, Maghakian was quoted as saying, "It was an easy job, like shooting fish in a barrel. I simply fired 30 rounds with my carbine and threw a grenade, and that was all. Not very interesting".

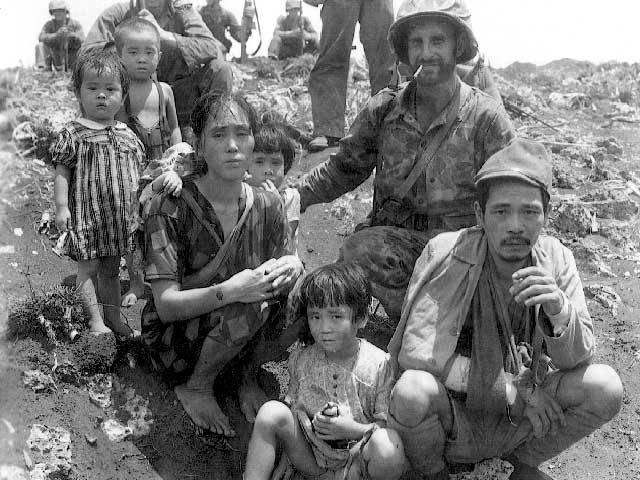
Sgt. Victor Maghakian in July 1944 with Japanese soldier's family found hiding in a cave and urged to come out by Chamorro guides with Marine units in Saipan.

After success at Kwajalein, Maghakian and Marine scouts landed on the Eniwetok Atoll, an island 350 miles (563.27 km) north of Kwajalein, in February 1944. The scouts hopped from one of the Atoll islands to the next, managing to take control of six islands. Orders soon arrived to secure more islands in the south. As the scouts patrolled the islets in the morning, the company smelled smoke that was distinguishable from Navy shelling. When following the footprints that were spotted on the beach shore, it led the platoon to a pile of palm fronds under a coconut tree. Japanese machine gun fire ambushed the platoon, but Maghakian managed to gun down the ambushers with his carbine. As the battle ensued, Maghakian killed the last four Japanese soldiers on Mellu island. During the battle, he saved the life of a young Lee Marvin. At night, numerous Japanese soldiers attempted to attack the Marine encampment. However, these efforts ended in failure with seventeen Japanese soldiers dead. Maghakian managed to kill twelve Japanese soldiers by the end of the campaign.

When orders were received to seize the island of Tinian of the Mariana Islands, 2nd and 4th Marine Divisions were given the task. The seizure would become known as the Battle of Tinian (24 July – 1 August 1944), and it would take ten days for the island to be secured. Maghakian, who took part in the fighting, raised the American flag on the island after its capture.

Maghakian was either part of the third or fourth wave of Marines to land on the beaches of Saipan. Landing under heavy artillery and mortar fire, the Marines dug in and fought throughout the day and night. They managed to capture a Japanese aircraft field at the southern tip of the island, which was captured twenty-six days later. Maghakian was once more sent to the United States for treatment.

== Awards and decorations ==

Navy Cross	Silver Star w/ gold 5/16 inch star (two awards)	Bronze Star Medal w/ gold 5/16 inch star (two awards)
Purple Heart w/ gold 5/16 inch star (two awards)	Presidential Unit Citation w/ two bronze 3/16 inch stars (three awards)	Navy Unit Commendation
Marine Corps Good Conduct Medal	China Service Medal	American Defense Service Medal
American Campaign Medal	Asiatic-Pacific Campaign Medal w/ one silver and two bronze 3/16 inch campaign stars (seven campaigns)	World War II Victory Medal

=== Navy Cross citation ===

Citation:

"The President of the United States of America takes pleasure in presenting the Navy Cross to Platoon Sergeant Victor Maghakian, United States Marine Corps, for extraordinary heroism and conspicuous devotion to duty while serving as a Platoon Sergeant of Company A, Second Marine Raider Battalion, during the Marine Raider Expedition against the Japanese-held island of Makin in the Gilbert Islands on 17 and 18 August 1942. Leading his platoon with great skill and determination, Platoon Sergeant Maghakian charged the beachhead with the landing force and was the first casualty in this operation. After receiving first aid, he returned to the front and remained there, courageously leading his men until directed by the Medical Officer to return to the rear. His gallant devotion to duty and complete disregard for his own personal safety were in keeping with the highest traditions of the United States Naval Service."

== Late life and death ==
After his participation in World War II, Maghakian became 60 percent disabled. He was a patient at the U.S. Naval hospital in Quantico, Virginia, in October 1945. He then went for more treatment at the Naval hospital in Philadelphia. In 1946, he was subsequently discharged from military duty as a captain. He returned to Fresno and later moved to Las Vegas, where he became a hotel executive and a security consultant from 1954 to 1974.

In 1974, Maghakian returned to Fresno, dying of colon cancer on August 17, 1977, at the age of 61. He is buried at the Armenian Ararat Cemetery in Fresno.

== Legacy ==
In 1981, the outpatient clinic of the Veterans Administration Medical Center in Fresno, California, was named after him. Lee Marvin attended the opening ceremony of the clinic, and during a speech stated:

Most of us stayed alive due to his excellent training. He was truly a sergeant who cared for his men

— Wukovits, John (2009). American commando Evans Carlson, his WWII Marine raiders, and America's first Special Forces mission. Penguin. ISBN 9781101057452.

The 1943 film Gung Ho! was based on the Makin Island raid led by Lieutenant Colonel Evans Carlson's 2nd Marine Raider Battalion, which Victor Maghakian participated in. Maghakian's role was played by famed actor Sam Levene. Maghakian was also the technical advisor to the movie.

On September 17, 1996, during the 2nd Session of the 104th Congress, U.S. Representative George Radanovich paid tribute to Victor Maghakian's dedication and service to the United States Military during World War II. In 2008, Maghakian's sister stated that, "he was a quiet and dedicated man and was always very calm, except for war. He was such a giving man".

Maghakian was one of the most decorated military men in World War II.
