= Reputational damage (diplomacy) =

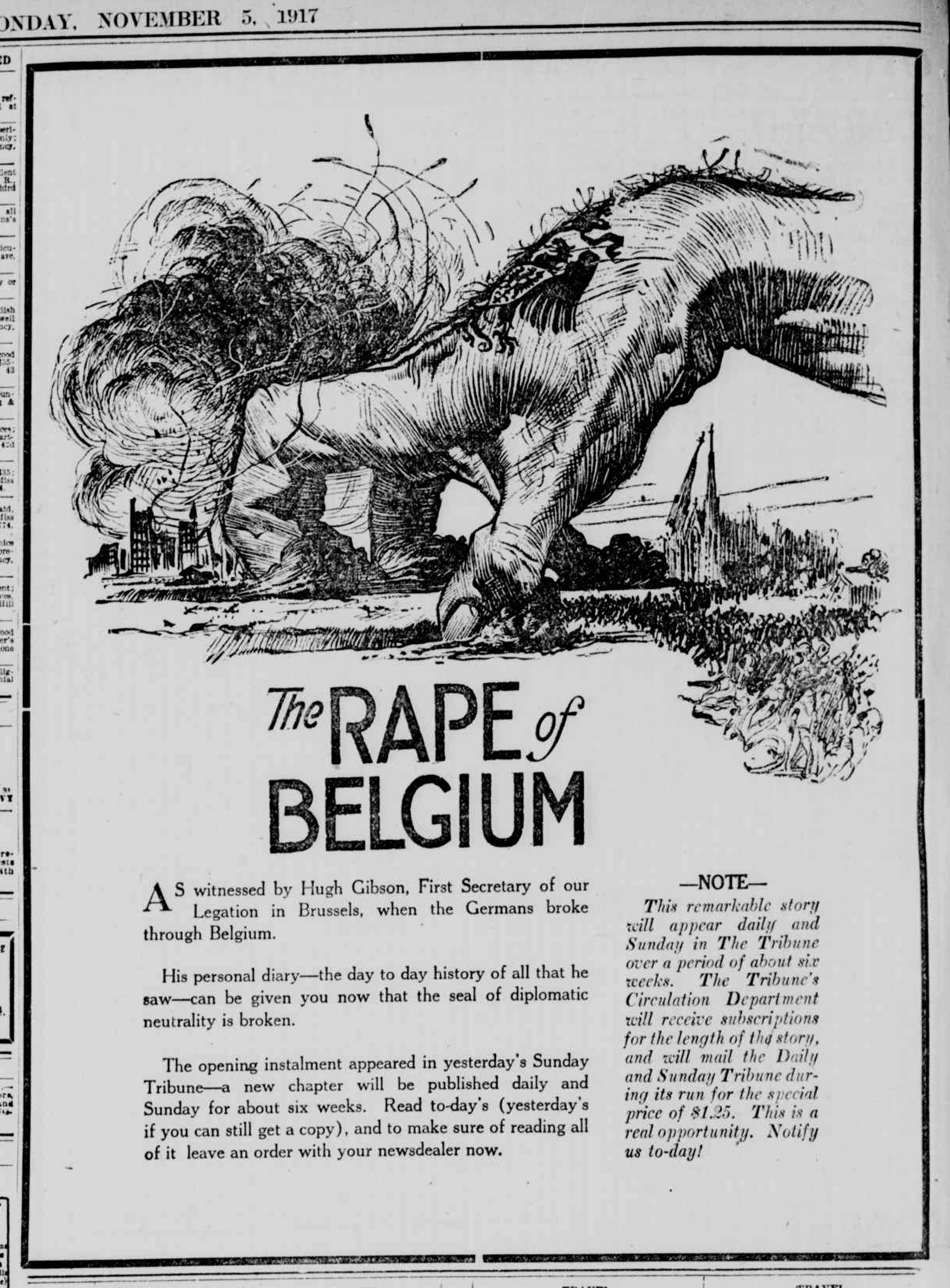
German war crimes in Belgium were cited in anti-German propaganda during World War I, causing reputational harm.

In diplomacy, reputational damage is harm to a country's diplomatic relations based on adverse events. Lack of human rights and perceived lack of concern for allied or partner countries may cause reputational damage. Scorecard diplomacy depends on countries wanting to minimize their reputational damage from poor compliance with international norms.
