= Tessa Hofmann =

German historian (born 1949)

Tessa Hofmann (born 15 December 1949, Bassum, Lower Saxony) is a scholar of Armenian studies and sociology, PhD, research scholar at the Free University of Berlin.

== Biography ==
She studied at the Department of Slavonic Languages and Literature, as well as Armenian studies and sociology at the Free University of Berlin.

Hofmann is a member of the Society for Threatened Peoples. She is the chairperson of reorganized Working Group “Affirmation” – Against Genocide, for Reconciliation. She is an active participant in the international initiative “Speaking with one voice!” for the recognition of the Armenian, Assyrian and Greek genocide. Hofmann is the author of over a dozen books on Armenian history and culture. She is an honorary professor at the Hrachia Acharian University, Yerevan (2002).

Hofmann is the editor of Takibat, Tehcir Ve İmha (2013), the Turkish edition of the original German collective monograph (2004; 2nd, rev. ed. 2007) on the genocide against Christians during the last decade of Ottoman rule.

== Publications ==
- Persecution, Expulsion and Annihilation of the Christian population in the Ottoman Empire, 1912-22
- "Annihilation, Impunity, Denial: The Case Study of the Armenian Genocide in the Ottoman Empire (1915/16) and Genocide Research in Comparison." Lecture in Japan at the "Comparative Genocide Studies", University of Tokyo, 27 March 2004.
- "Armenians in Turkey today: a critical assessment of the situation of the Armenian minority in the Turkish Republic ". Brussels, 2002.
