= Soghomon Tehlirian =

Armenian revolutionary and assassin (1896–1960)

- Սողոմոն Թեհլիրեան
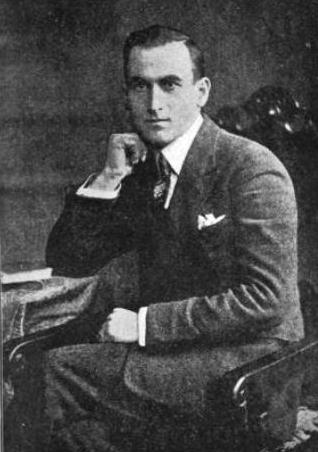
- Tehlirian in 1921
- Born: April 2, 1896; Bagarich, Erzurum, Ottoman Empire
- Died: May 23, 1960 (aged 64); San Francisco, California, U.S.
- Resting place: Ararat Cemetery, Fresno, California
- Known for: Killing of Talaat Pasha

Soghomon Tehlirian (Armenian: Սողոմոն Թեհլիրեան; April 2, 1896 – May 23, 1960) was an Armenian revolutionary and soldier who killed Talaat Pasha, the former Grand Vizier of the Ottoman Empire, in Berlin on March 15, 1921. He was entrusted to carry out the assassination after having earlier killed Harutian Mgrditichian, who had worked for the Ottoman secret police and helped compile the list of Armenian intellectuals who were deported on April 24, 1915.

Talaat's killing was a part of Operation Nemesis, a revenge plan by the Armenian Revolutionary Federation against members of the Ottoman Imperial Government responsible for the Armenian genocide during World War I. Talaat Pasha had been convicted and sentenced to death in absentia in the Turkish courts-martial of 1919–20, and was viewed as the main orchestrator of the genocide. After a two-day trial Tehlirian was found not guilty by a German court, and freed.

Tehlirian is considered a national hero by Armenians.

== Life ==
Soghomon Tehlirian was born on April 2, 1896, in the village of Bagarich (Բագառիճ; present-day Çadırkaya, Tercan, Turkey), in the Erzurum vilayet of the Ottoman Empire. He was raised in Erzincan.

Tehlirian's father left for Serbia to secure the family's planned move to the country. After his return in 1905, he was arrested and sentenced to six months imprisonment. During this time, the Tehlirian family moved from Nerkin Bagarij to Erzinjan. Tehlirian received his initial education at the Protestant elementary school in Erzinjan. After graduation at the Getronagan (Central) Lyceum of Constantinople, he went to study engineering in Serbia and had plans to continue his education in Germany.

== Genocide ==
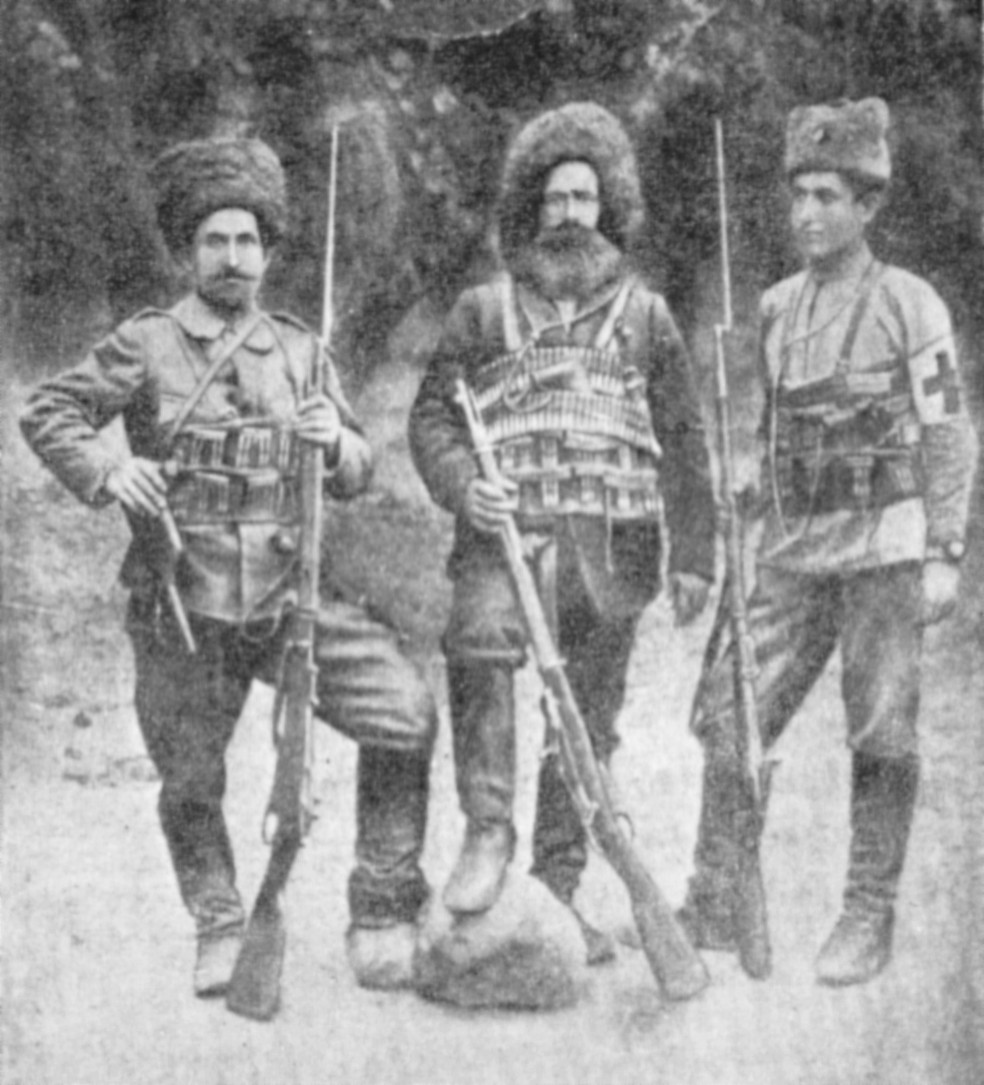
Soghomon (right), Sahak, and Misak Tehlirian (brothers) as volunteers in the Russian army

He was in Valjevo, Serbia, in June 1914. In the fall of that year, Tehlirian made his way to Russia and joined the army to serve in a volunteer unit on the Caucasus Front against the Turks.

According to History's Great Untold Stories: Larger than Life Characters & Dramatic Events that Changed the World, in June 1915, the Ottoman local police ordered the deportation of all the Armenians in Erzinjan. Tehlirian's mother, three sisters, his sister's husband, his two brothers, and a two-year-old niece were deported. All told, Tehlirian lost 85 family members to the Armenian Genocide.

In 2016 Tehlirian's son, who spoke to The Independent but did not reveal his name, stated that Tehlirian's mother and Vasken, his older brother, died in the genocide – the latter was studying medicine and living in Beirut – but that Tehlirian did not have a sister, that his father was fighting in the war in Russia, and that his other two brothers were in Serbia.

== Assassination of Talaat Pasha ==
After the war, Tehlirian went to Constantinople, where he killed Harutian Mgrditichian, who had worked for the Ottoman secret police and helped compile the list of Armenian intellectuals who were deported on April 24, 1915. Meanwhile, Operation Nemesis was being set up to assassinate leaders responsible for the Armenian genocide and Tehlirian's killing of Mgrditichian convinced Nemesis operatives to entrust him with the killing of Talat Pasha. In mid-1920, the Nemesis organization paid for Tehlirian to travel to the United States, where Garo briefed him that the death sentences pronounced against the major perpetrators had not been carried out, and that the killers continued their anti-Armenian activities from exile. That fall, the Turkish nationalist movement invaded Armenia. Tehlirian received the photographs of seven leading CUP leaders, whose whereabouts Nemesis was tracking, and departed for Europe, going first to Paris. In Geneva, he obtained a visa to go to Berlin as a mechanical engineering student, leaving on December 2.

Tehlirian's main target was Talaat Pasha, who was a member of the military triumvirate known as the "Three Pashas" who controlled the Ottoman Empire. He was the former Minister of the Interior and Grand Vizier (an office equivalent to that of a prime minister), and was noted for his prominent role in the Armenian Genocide. Talaat had been sentenced to death in absentia by an Istanbul court in 1919. He had fled to Germany, a former ally of the Ottoman Empire which did not extradite him to Turkey. As soon Tehlirian found Talaat Pasha's address on 4 Hardenbergstraße, in Berlin's Charlottenburg district, he rented an apartment near his house so that he could study his everyday routine.

Tehlirian shadowed Talaat as he left his house on Hardenbergstraße on the morning of March 15, 1921. He crossed the street to view him from the opposite sidewalk, then crossed it once more to walk past him to confirm his identity. He then turned around and pointed his gun to shoot him in the nape of the neck. Talaat was felled with a single 9mm parabellum round from a Luger P08 pistol. The assassination took place in broad daylight and led to the German police immediately arresting Tehlirian, who had been told by his handlers, Armen Garo and Shahan Natalie, not to run from the crime scene.

== Trial ==
Tehlirian was tried for murder, but was eventually acquitted by the twelve-man jury. His trial was highly publicized at the time, taking place shortly after the establishment of the Weimar Republic, with Tehlirian being represented by three German defense attorneys, including Dr. Theodor Niemeyer, professor of law at Kiel University. Priest and Armenian Genocide survivor Grigoris Balakian, German activist Johannes Lepsius, and German Army general Otto Liman von Sanders, who had been a field marshal in the Ottoman Army during the war, were among several of the prominent individuals called as witnesses to the trial.

The trial examined not only Tehlirian's actions but also Tehlirian's conviction that Talaat was the main author of the Armenian deportation and mass killings. The defense attorneys made no attempt to deny the fact that Tehlirian had killed a man, and instead focused on the influence of the Armenian Genocide on Tehlirian's mental state. Tehlirian claimed during the trial that he had been present in Erzincan in 1915 and had been deported along with his family and personally witnessed their murder. When asked by the judge if he felt any sort of guilt, Tehlirian remarked, "I do not consider myself guilty because my conscience is clear…I have killed a man. But I am not a murderer."

During his trial, Tehlirian claimed that while he was in Germany, he saw his mother in his dreams who scorned her son for seeing Talaat Pasha and not having taken revenge yet. During the trial, Tehlirian's dream was described as follows:

He remained calm, and thoughts of vengeance did not occur to him. He carried on as before until five to six weeks later, when he saw a dream, materially almost like a vision. His mother's corpse arose before him. He told her, "I saw Talaat." His mother answered, "You saw Talaat and you did not avenge your mother's, father's, brothers', and sisters' murders? You are no longer my son." This is the moment when the defendant thought, "I have to do something. I want to be my mother's son again. She cannot turn me away when I go to be with her in heaven. I want her to clasp me to her bosom like before." As the doctors explained, the dream ended when he woke up.

It took the jury slightly over an hour to render a verdict of "not guilty."

German reactions to the verdict were mixed, being generally favorable among those who were sympathetic to Armenians or universal human rights. Journalist Emil Ludwig wrote, "Only when a society of nations has organized itself as the protector of international order will no Armenian killer remain unpunished, because no Turkish Pasha has the right to send a nation into the desert".

== Later life ==
Soghomon Tehlirian monument on his grave in Ararat Cemetery in Fresno, California (erected in 1969). The monument incorrectly listed his date of birth as April 15, 1896 (pictured in 2009).

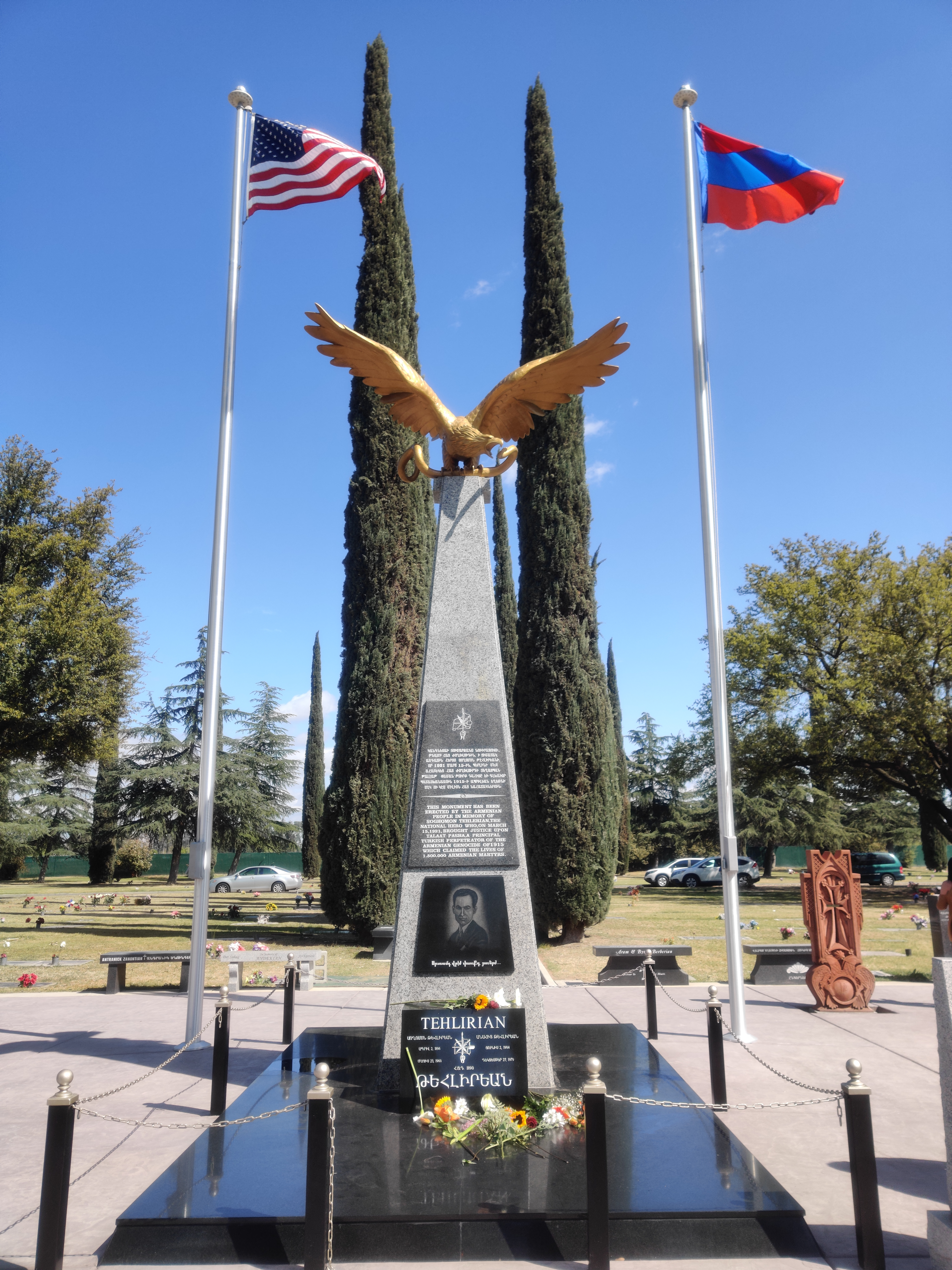
The renovated Soghomon Tehlirian monument in 2022. As of February 2025, the cemetery's website still listed the incorrect birthdate.

After the assassination, Tehlirian moved to Cleveland in the United States. He then moved to Marseille and then Yugoslavia and eventually married Anahit Tatikian who was also from Erzincan. She was 15 when they first met in 1917.

During his days in Serbia, Tehlirian was a member of the shooting club and was considered a skilled marksman. The couple moved to Belgrade and lived there until 1950, when they moved first to Casablanca, then to Paris, and finally to San Francisco. There he worked as a postal clerk, and he lived under the name Saro Melikian.

Tehlirian died in 1960 of a cerebral hemorrhage, and is buried at the Ararat Cemetery in Fresno, California. Tehlirian's monument-grave is an obelisk with a gold-plated eagle slaying a snake on top. It is reported that the original artist of the monument was quoted as saying that the eagle was "the arm of justice of the Armenian people extending their wrath onto Talaat Pasha," who was symbolized by the snake. The monument itself is centered in the middle of the cemetery with a walkway made of red brick surrounded by cypress trees.

== Legacy ==
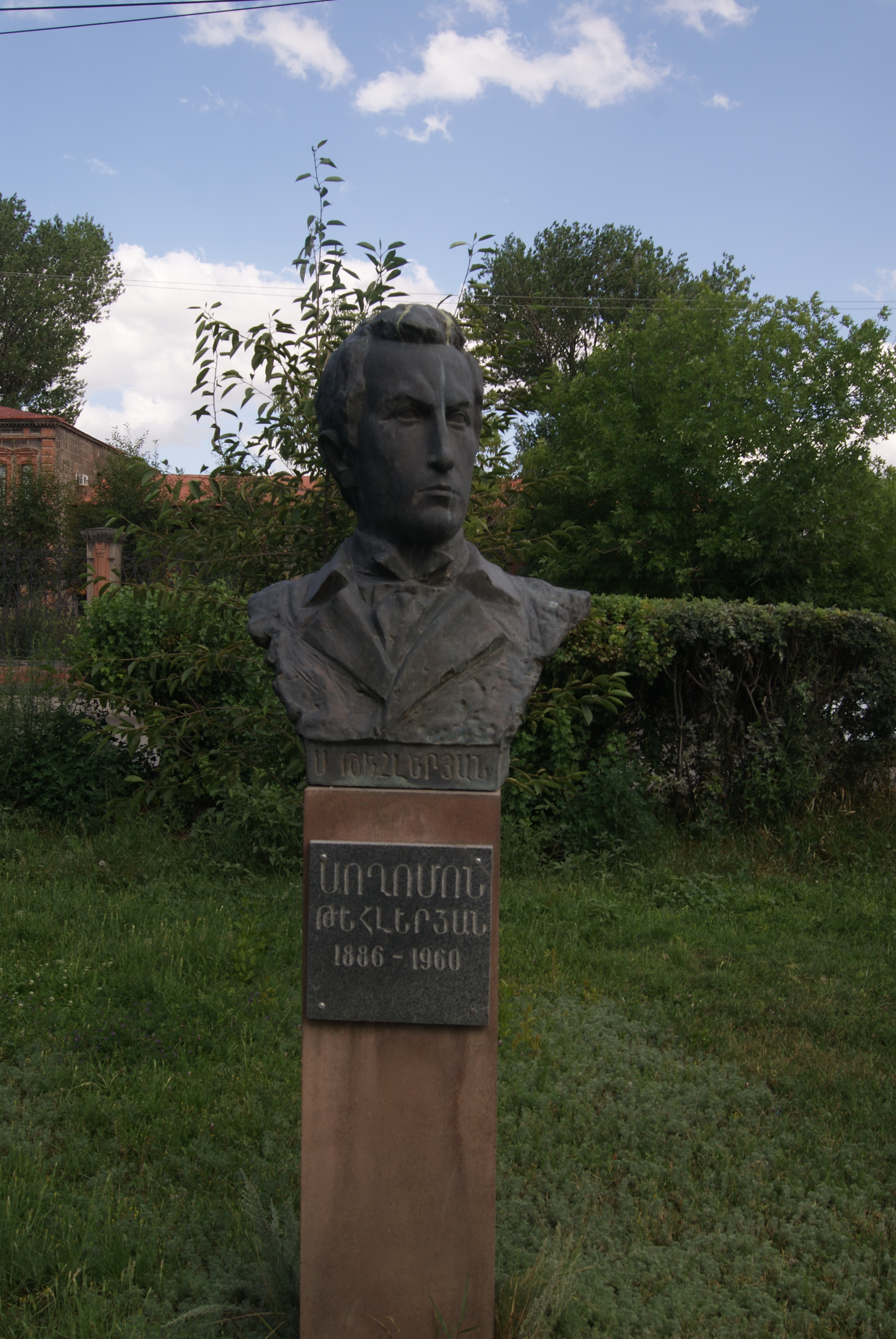
Tehlirian's bust in Gyumri, Armenia. The plaque attached to the pillar incorrectly lists his year of birth as 1886 instead of 1896.

His trial for murder influenced Polish-Jewish lawyer Raphael Lemkin, who later reflected on the trial, "Tehlirian acted as the self-appointed legal officer for the conscience of mankind. But can a man appoint himself to mete out justice? Will not passion sway such a type of justice and rather make a travesty of it?" As a result, Lemkin was inspired to campaign for a law allowing genocide to be prosecuted under universal jurisdiction, reasoning that state sovereignty "cannot be conceived as the right to kill millions of innocent people". Historian Hans-Lukas Kieser states "Assassination perpetuated the sick relationship of a victim in quest of revenge with a perpetrator entrenched in defiant denial, instead of humble courage for the truth and redress."

Political theorist Hannah Arendt, in her 1963 book Eichmann in Jerusalem, compares Tehlirian to Sholem Schwarzbard, who assassinated Ukrainian statesman Symon Petliura in Paris in 1925 for what Schwarzbard believed to be Petlyura's culpability in the anti-Jewish pogroms in Ukraine. Arendt suggests that each man "insisted on being tried", in order "to show the world through court procedure what crimes against his people had been committed and gone unpunished".

[T]he one in the center of the play, on whom all eyes are fastened, is now the true hero, while at the same time the trial character of the proceedings is safeguarded, because it is not "a spectacle with prearranged results" but contains that element of "irreducible risk" which... is an indispensable factor in all criminal trials. Also, the J'accuse, so indispensable from the viewpoint of the victim, sounds, of course, much more convincing in the mouth of a man who has been forced to take the law into his own hands than in the voice of a government-appointed agent who risks nothing. And yet... it is more than doubtful that this solution would have been justifiable in Eichmann's case, and it is obvious that it would have been altogether unjustifiable if carried out by government agents. The point in favor of Schwartzbard and Tehlirian was that each was a member of an ethnic group that did not possess its own state and legal system, that there was no tribunal in the world to which either group could have brought its victims.

Several statues of Tehlirian have been erected in Armenia. His first statue in Armenia was inaugurated in 1990 in the village of Mastara.

In 2017 a square in Marseille, France, was named after him.

== In popular culture ==
In 2014, Tehlirian's story was told in a graphic novel, Special Mission: Nemesis.

Music

The song Գինի լից, Gini lits ("Pour the wine"), is a well-known revolutionary song, which commemorates and glorifies the assassination of Talaat by Tehlirian. It has been recorded in a variety of versions and is known by heart by many Armenians. The version by Sahak Sahakyan also has a music video. The first stanza of the song goes:

The Armenians' horror shook the world,
The Turkish throne fell to the ground,
Let me tell you about the death of Talaat.
Pour the wine, dear friend, pour the wine,
Drink it nicely; drink it with delight.

Film

- The 1982 American film Assignment Berlin, directed by Hrayr Toukhanian, chronicles Talaat Pasha's assassination in Berlin.
- The 1986 Turkish film Duvardaki Kan ("Blood on the Wall") adapts Tehlirian's trial.
- The 1991 French film Mayrig by Henri Verneuil depicts Talaat's assassination and Tehlirian's trial.
- The 2020 short film The Attempt, directed by Daniel Despart, depicts Tehlirian's assassination of Talaat Pasha.
