= Outline of the Armenian genocide =

Overview of and topical guide to the Armenian genocide

Armenian genocide
- Part of World War I
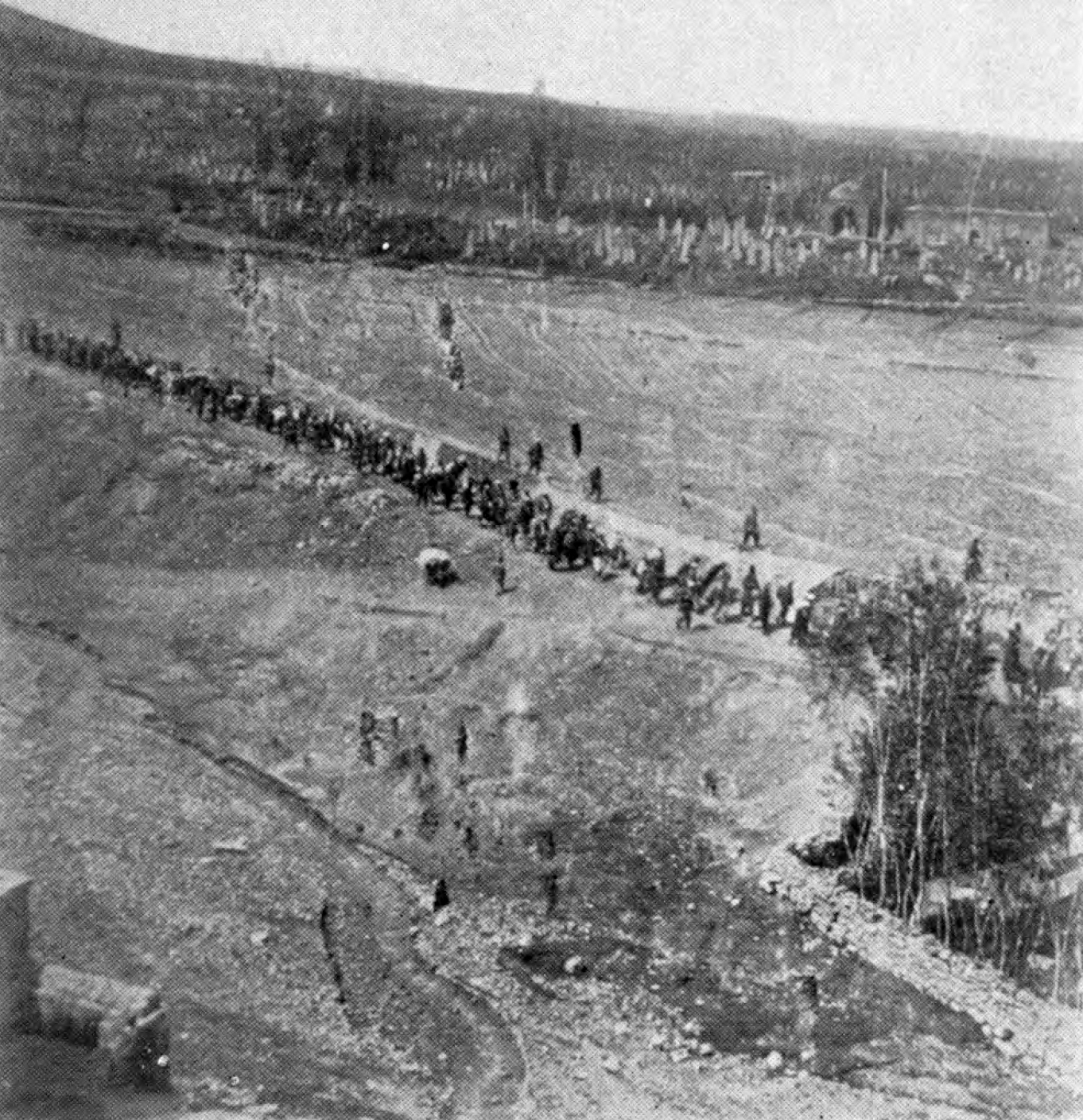
- Column of Armenian deportees guarded by gendarmes in Harput vilayet
- Location: Ottoman Empire
- Date: 1915–1917
- Target: Ottoman Armenians
- Attack type: Genocide, death march, Islamization
- Deaths: 600,000–1.5 million
- Perpetrator: Committee of Union and Progress

The following outline is provided as an overview of and topical guide to the Armenian genocide. (Note: The names of the Armenian genocide are different in the English, Turkish, and Armenian languages, and have led to political controversies around the issue of Armenian genocide denial and Armenian genocide recognition. Although the majority of historians writing in English use the word "genocide", other terms exist. See Terminology of the Armenian genocide for more information.)

The Armenian genocide was the systematic destruction of the Armenian people and identity in the Ottoman Empire during World War I. Spearheaded by the ruling Committee of Union and Progress (CUP), it was implemented primarily through the mass murder of around one million Armenians during death marches to the Syrian desert and the forced Islamization of others, primarily women and children.

== Main articles ==
- Armenian genocide
- Armenian genocide denial
- Armenian genocide in culture
- Armenian genocide recognition
- Armenian Genocide Remembrance Day
- Armenian genocide survivors
- Armenian resistance during the Armenian genocide
- Armenians in the Ottoman Empire
- Bibliography of the Armenian genocide
- Casualties of the Armenian genocide
- Causes of the Armenian genocide
- Committee of Union and Progress
- Late Ottoman genocides
- List of Armenian genocide memorials
- Prosecution of Ottoman war criminals after World War I
- Rescue of Armenians during the Armenian genocide
- Witnesses and testimonies of the Armenian genocide

== Background ==
- 1914 Armenian reforms
- Adana massacre
- Armenian congress at Erzurum
- Armenian question
- Armenians in the Ottoman Empire
- Balkan Wars
- Battle of Sarikamish
- Causes of the Armenian genocide
- Hamidian massacres
- Ottoman Armenian population
- Ottoman Empire in World War I
- Turkish nationalism
- Young Turk Revolution

== Organizations ==
- Cheta (armed group)
- Committee of Union and Progress
- Hamidiye (cavalry)
- Special Organization (Ottoman Empire)

== Victims ==
- Armenian genocide survivors
- Armenians in Turkey
- Casualties of the Armenian genocide
- Greek genocide
- Hidden Armenians
- Late Ottoman genocides
- Sayfo
- Vorpahavak

== Persecution ==
=== Deportation ===
- 1914 Greek deportations
- Deir ez-Zor camps
- Deportation of Armenian intellectuals on 24 April 1915
- Ras al-Ayn camps
- Sürgün
- Temporary Law of Deportation

=== Atrocities ===
- 1915 genocide in Diyarbekir
- 20 Hunchakian gallows
- Armenian genocide in Trebizond
- Labour battalions (Turkey)
- Rape during the Armenian genocide

== Resistance ==
- Armenian fedayi
- Armenian resistance during the Armenian genocide
- Defense of Azakh
- Defense of Van (1915)
- Musa Dagh
- Shabin-Karahisar uprising
- Urfa resistance
- Zeitun Resistance (1914 and 1915)

== Rescue ==
- Anatolia College in Merzifon
- Euphrates College
- The Georgetown Boys
- National Armenian Relief Committee
- Near East Foundation
- Rescue of Armenians during the Armenian genocide
- Turkish opposition to the Armenian genocide

== International response ==
- Germany and the Armenian genocide
- Harbord Commission
- May 1915 Triple Entente declaration
- Press coverage during the Armenian genocide

== Aftermath ==
- Armenia without Armenians
- Armenian cultural heritage in Turkey
- Armenian genocide reparations
- Assassination of Talaat Pasha
- Burning of Smyrna
- Confiscation of Armenian properties in Turkey
- Istanbul trials of 1919–1920
- Malta exiles
- Operation Nemesis
- Prosecution of Ottoman war criminals after World War I
- State funeral of Talaat Pasha
- Treaty of Lausanne
- Turkish invasion of Armenia

== Recognition ==
- 2015 Armenian March for Justice
- Armenian genocide recognition
- I Apologize campaign
- Kurdish recognition of the Armenian genocide
- Perinçek v. Switzerland
- United States recognition of the Armenian genocide

== Denial ==
- Armenian genocide denial
- ASİMKK

== People ==
=== Ottoman leadership ===
- Bahaeddin Şakir
- Cemal Azmi
- Cevdet Tahir Belbez
- Djemal Pasha
- Enver Pasha
- Mehmed Kemal Bey
- Mehmed Reshid
- Doctor Nâzım
- Talaat Pasha
- Three Pashas

=== Witnesses ===
- Ahmet Rıza
- Cossva Anckarsvärd
- Leslie Davis (diplomat)
- Mustafa Arif Deymer
- Lewis Einstein
- Faiz El-Ghusein
- Giacomo Gorrini
- Hasan Mazhar
- Oscar S. Heizer
- George Horton
- Jesse B. Jackson
- Mehmet Celal Bey
- Henry Morgenthau Sr.
- Rafael de Nogales
- Faik Ali Ozansoy
- Reshid Akif Pasha
- Süleyman Nazif
- Wehib Pasha

== Historiography and memory ==
=== Commemoration ===
- 100th anniversary of the Armenian genocide
- 1965 Yerevan demonstrations
- 60th anniversary of the Armenian genocide commemorations in Beirut
- Armenian Genocide Remembrance Day
- List of visitors to Tsitsernakaberd
- Madagh

=== Memorials ===
- Armenian Genocide Martyrs Monument
- Armenian Genocide Memorial Church, Der Zor
- Armenian Genocide Memorial in Larnaca
- Armenian Genocide Monument in Nicosia
- Armenian Genocide Museum of America
- Armenian Heritage Park
- Armenian Martyrs Memorial
- Istanbul Armenian Genocide memorial
- List of Armenian genocide memorials
- Lyon Armenian Genocide Memorial
- Marseille Genocide Memorial
- Monument to Humanity
- Tsitsernakaberd
- Wales Genocide Memorial

=== Historiography ===
- Armenian genocide and the Holocaust
- Bibliography of the Armenian genocide
- Hitler's Obersalzberg Speech
- Hitler's reference to the Armenian genocide
- Terminology of the Armenian genocide
- Witnesses and testimonies of the Armenian genocide
- The Bastard of Istanbul
- Bluebeard (Vonnegut novel)
- Forgotten Fire
- The Forty Days of Musa Dagh
- Skylark Farm
- The Story of the Last Thought

==== Histories ====
- America and the Armenian Genocide of 1915
- The Armenian Genocide: A Complete History
- The Burning Tigris
- Dark Pasts
- Denial of Violence
- The Great Game of Genocide
- Killing Orders
- Open Wounds
- Operation Nemesis (book)
- A Shameful Act
- Talaat Pasha: Father of Modern Turkey, Architect of Genocide
- They Can Live in the Desert but Nowhere Else
- The Thirty-Year Genocide
- The Young Turks' Crime Against Humanity

==== Historians ====
- Taner Akçam
- Donald Bloxham
- Vahakn Dadrian
- Fuat Dündar
- Fatma Müge Göçek
- Richard G. Hovannisian
- Stefan Ihrig
- Hilmar Kaiser
- Raymond Kévorkian
- Ümit Kurt (historian)
- Raphael Lemkin
- Robert Melson (political scientist)
- Ara Sarafian
- Ronald Grigor Suny
- Yves Ternon
- Uğur Ümit Üngör

=== Testimony and records ===
- Ambassador Morgenthau's Story
- Armenian Golgotha
- Blue Book (Bryce and Toynbee book)
- Goodbye, Antoura
- The Memoirs of Naim Bey
- Ravished Armenia
- The Road from Home

=== Films ===
- 1915 (film)
- 588 rue paradis
- Ararat (film)
- The Cut (2014 drama film)
- The Forty Days of Musa Dagh (film)
- The Lark Farm
- List of films about the Armenian genocide
- Mayrig
- Nahapet
- The Promise (2016 film)
- Ravished Armenia (film)
- Yearning (1990 film)

==== Documentaries ====
- 100 Years Later
- Aghet – Ein Völkermord
- The Armenian Genocide (film)
- Aurora's Sunrise
- Back to Ararat
- Intent to Destroy
- Map of Salvation
- Motherland (2022 film)
- My Son Shall Be Armenian
- Orphans of the Genocide
- Screamers (2006 film)
- They Shall Not Perish

=== Art ===
- Armenian genocide in culture
- Ils sont tombés

== Bibliography ==
- Akçam, T. (2012). The Young Turks' crime against humanity: The Armenian genocide and ethnic cleansing in the Ottoman Empire. Princeton University Press.
- Bloxham, D. (2005). The great game of genocide: Imperialism, nationalism, and the destruction of the Ottoman Armenians. Oxford University Press.
- Dadrian, V. N. (1995). The history of the Armenian genocide: Ethnic conflict from the Balkans to Anatolia to the Caucasus. Berghahn Books.
- Kévorkian, R. (2011). The Armenian genocide: A complete history. I. B. Tauris.
- Suny, R. G. (2015). "They can live in the desert but nowhere else": A history of the Armenian genocide. Princeton University Press.
- Üngör, U. Ü. (2011). The making of modern Turkey: Nation and state in Eastern Anatolia, 1913–1950. Oxford University Press.

== See also ==
- Genocide
- Crimes against humanity
- Ottoman Empire
- World War I
- Outline of World War I
- Outline of Genocide studies
- Outline of the Cambodian genocide
- Outline of the Armenian genocide
- Outline of the Holocaust
- Outline of the Holodomor
