= Armenian Genocide Martyrs Monument =

Monument in Montebello, California, USA

Coordinates: 34°1′42.19″N 118°7′51.40″W

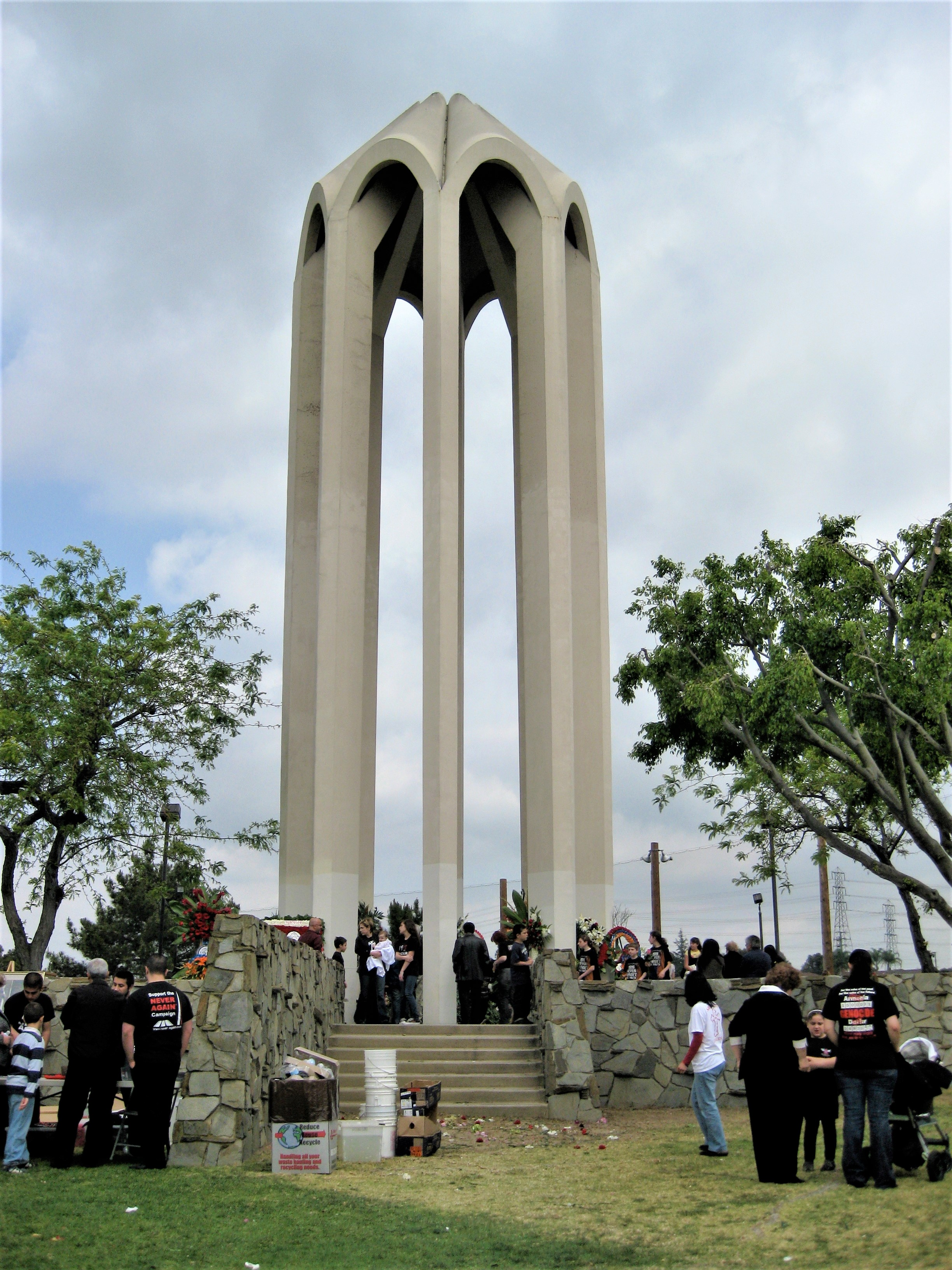
- Interactive map of the Armenian Genocide Martyrs Monument area

General information
- Type: memorial
- Location: Bicknell Park, Montebello, California
- Groundbreaking: 1967
- Opened: April 21, 1968
- Cost: $125,000
- Owner: City of Montebello

Height
- Height: 75 feet (23 m)

Design and construction
- Architect: Hrant Agbabian

Website
- armenianmonument.org

The Armenian Genocide Martyrs Monument is a monument in Montebello, California in the Los Angeles metropolitan area, dedicated to the victims of the Armenian genocide of 1915. The monument, opened in April 1968, is a tower of eight arches supported on 75-foot-tall (23 m) white concrete columns. The memorial was designed by Hrant Agbabian. It is the oldest and largest memorial in the United States dedicated to the Armenian Genocide victims. The inscription on the memorial plaque reads:

Armenian Martyrs Memorial Monument: This Monument erected by Americans of Armenian descent, is dedicated to the 1,500,000 Armenian victims of the Genocide perpetrated by the Turkish Government, 1915–1921, and to men of all nations who have fallen victim to crimes against humanity.

As part of the Armenian Genocide Remembrance Day, thousands of Armenians from different parts of Greater Los Angeles area and American politicians gather in Montebello memorial every year on April 24 and lay flowers to the victims of the genocide.

== History ==
After the 50th anniversary of the Armenian Genocide in 1965, the Armenian community of Los Angeles decided to build a memorial, which would serve as a permanent location for commemorating the Armenian Genocide victims. They spent months looking for a site in the city of Montebello and came across land that the Bicknell family had dedicated to the city for public use. A group of Armenians led by Michael Minasian who was the founder of the Armenian Monument council started the process of exploring different architectural drawings. On January 12, 1967, the city Approved by a vote of 4-1 the design to build the Armenian Genocide memorial, the headlines read "CITY ACCEPTS PLANS OF ARMENIAN SHAFT". Armenians from around the world participated in the fundraising, which gathered $125,000.

According to journalist Garin Hovannisian, the building of the monument was a "milestone for the Armenians of the United States". Then he continues, "it had taken almost three years of city hall meetings, town hall debates, and community fund-raising to consecrate, in public park, a monument". He also notes that "ARF, Ramgavar, Armenakan, Apostolic, Catholic, Protestant, and every other category of Armenian converged at Bicknell Park for the opening ceremony". According to Hovannisian more than ten thousand Armenians attended the dedication ceremony. Then State Senator George Deukmejian, who would later become Governor of California, read Governor Ronald Reagan's proclamation.

Signs showing the location of the Armenian Genocide Martyr's Monument were installed along California State Route 60 near the Garfield/Wilcox exits on March 22, 2011.

In 2025, members of the California State Legislature formally requested that the Memorial be designated a California Historical Landmark. In response, the State Historical Resources Commission unanimously voted to officially designate the monument.

== Notable visitors ==
- Ronald Reagan, President of the United States
- Serzh Sargsyan, President of Armenia
- Bako Sahakyan, President of Nagorno Karabakh
- Arnold Schwarzenegger, Governor of California
- Gray Davis, Lieutenant Governor of California
- Barbara Boxer, US Senator from California
- Adam Schiff, US Congressman
- Jackie Speier, US Congresswoman
- Grace Napolitano, US Congresswoman
- Michael D. Antonovich, Member of the Los Angeles County Board of Supervisors
- Antonio Villaraigosa, Mayor of Los Angeles Majority Leader of the California Assembly
- Dianne Feinstein, US Senator from California
- Eric Garcetti, Mayor of Los Angeles
- Lee Baca, former Los Angeles Country Sheriff
- Gil Garcetti, District Attorney of Los Angeles County
- Carmen Trutanich, Los Angeles City Attorney
- Charles Calderon, California State Assembly Majority Leader
- Geoffrey Robertson, international judge and human rights activist
- Israel Charny, psychologist, historian and world-renowned genocide expert
- Jack Hadjinian Mayor of Montebello
- Mark Geragos, Armenian-American lawyer
- Sebu Simonian, Armenian-American singer
- Judy Chu, US Congresswoman
- Araksya Karapetyan, Fox 11 News Anchor

== Gallery ==
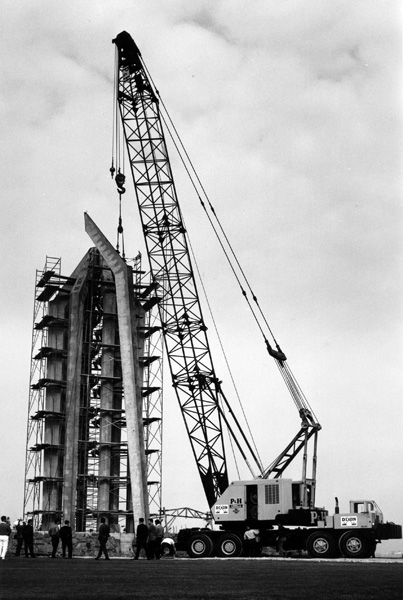
The memorial under construction

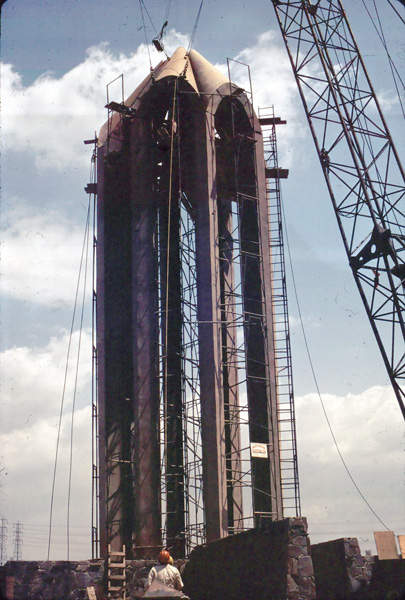
The memorial under construction

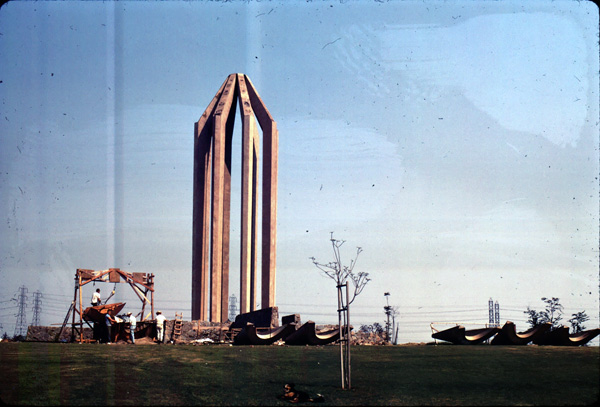
Faraway view at the memorial during construction

The memorial plaque

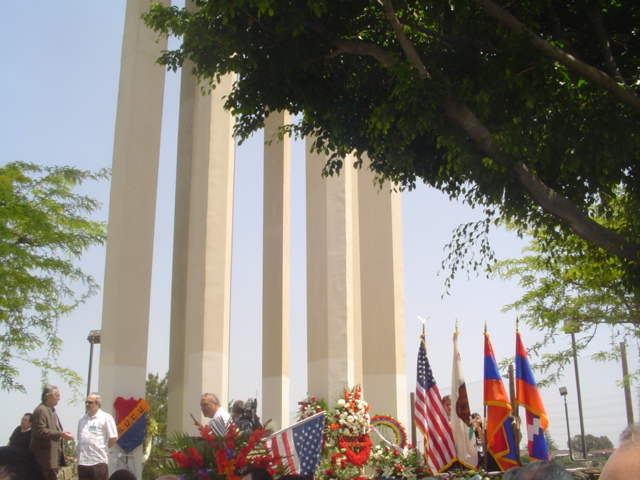
April 24, 2008

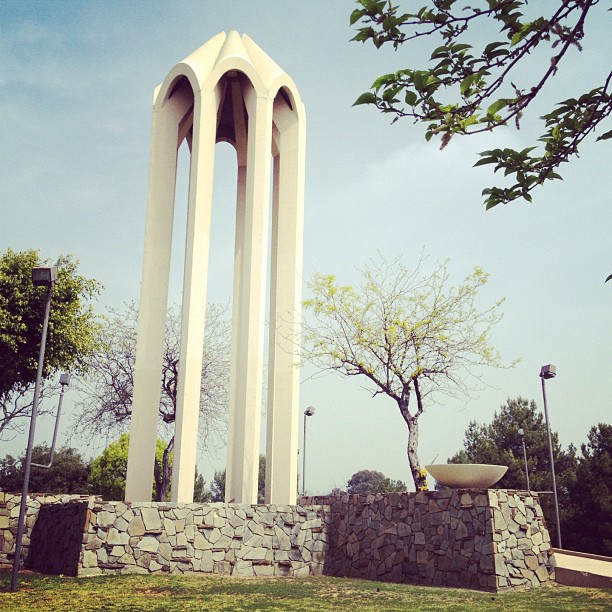
The memorial in 2012

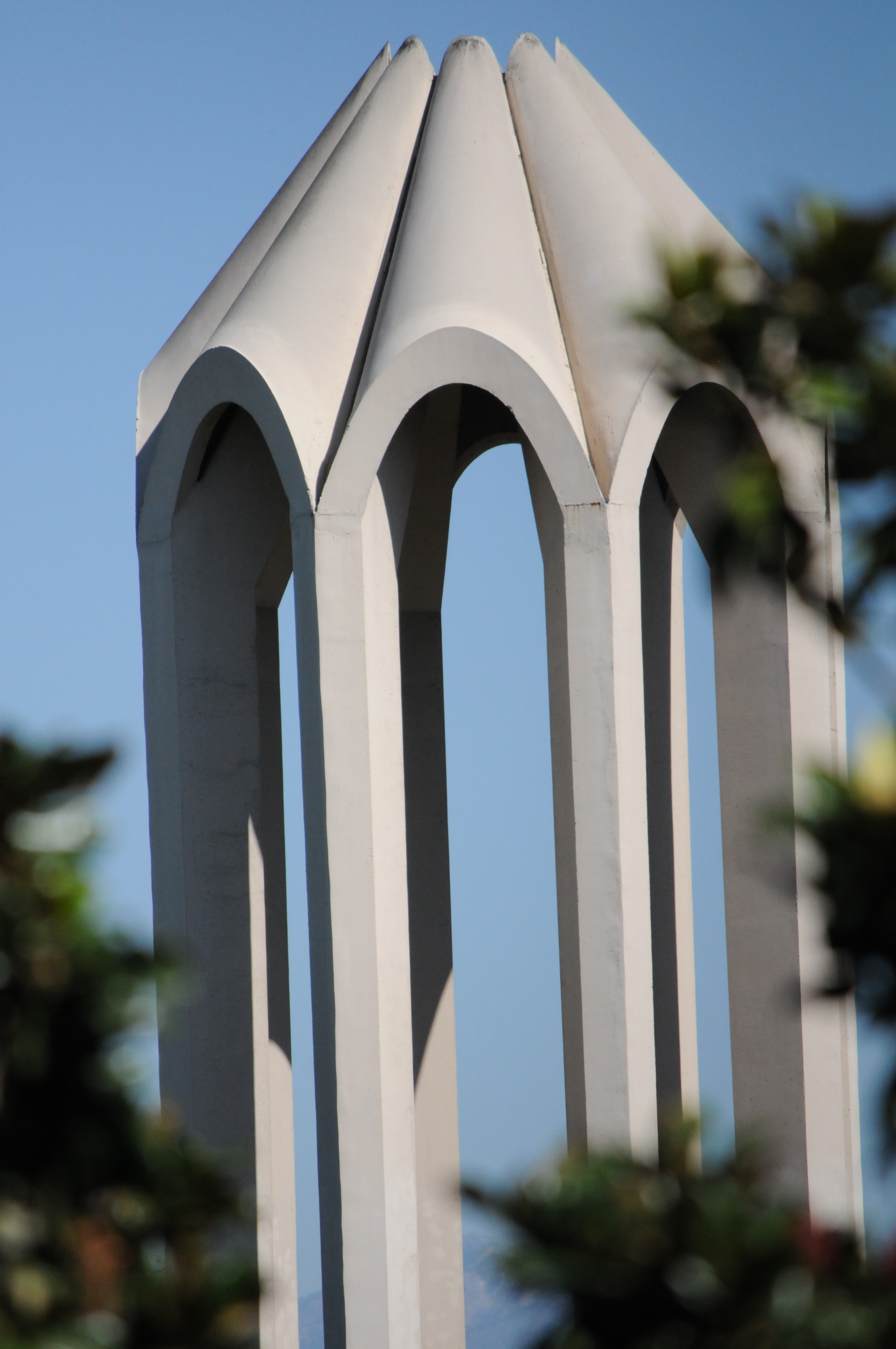
Close up

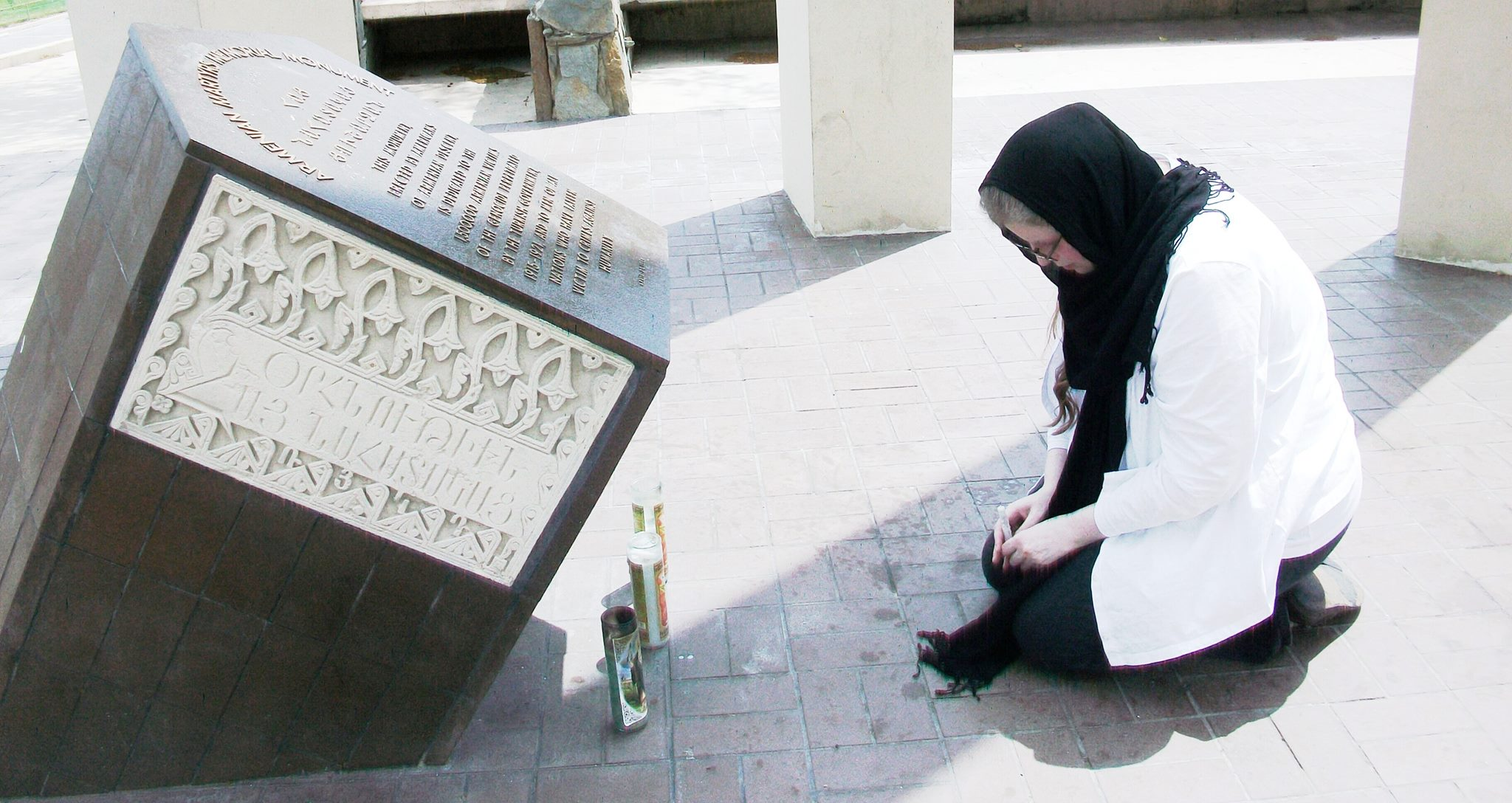
Woman offering prayers April 2016

== See also ==
- List of Armenian genocide memorials
- Armenian American
- History of the Armenian Americans in Los Angeles

== References and sources ==
Notes

Sources

- Hovannisian, Garin K. (2010). Family of Shadows: A century of murder, memory, and the Armenian American dream. New York: HarperCollins. ISBN 978-0-06-179208-3.
