= Jack Hadjinian =

Political figure

Mayor of Montebello, California
- In office November 25, 2014 – November 2015
- Succeeded by: Vanessa Delgado

Personal details
- Born: September 17, 1977 (age 49) Montebello, California
- Education: University of Southern California
- Website: https://jackhadjinian.c21.com/

Jack Hadjinian is the former mayor of Montebello, California and a former member of the Montebello City Council.

== Life and career ==
Jack Hadjinian was born in Montebello, California, to a second-generation Armenian-American family. His grandfather was a survivor of the Armenian genocide. He attended Armenian Mesrobian School, a local Armenian private school. After graduating high school, he continued his studies at Pasadena City College and the University of Southern California. He is a graduate of the FBI Citizens Academy.

Hadjinian works as a commercial real-estate agent and is a member of the Montebello Board of Realtors. He also served as the Chairman of the Montebello Chamber of Commerce, Chairman of the Civil Service Commission, and member of the Investment Committee.

Jack Hadjinian was a crew member of the 1997 APBA World Championship Offshore Race Team X-Plosive. https://www.apba.org/offshore-category.html

== Political career ==
Hadjinian ran for Montebello City Council in 2011 and was elected as a councilmember on November 8 and became the first Armenian-American to serve on the City Council. After Hadjinian had served three years on the City Council, his fellow councilmembers selected him as mayor. Art Barajas, a councilman, became the Mayor Pro Tem. The swearing-in ceremony was attended by Sheriff Jim McDonnell, Los Angeles City Councilman Paul Krekorian, and Archbishop Moushegh Mardirossian, Prelate of the Armenian Apostolic Church of America. Hadjinian was reelected to the City Council in November 2015 for a second term. Jack Hadjinian once again ran for reelection in November 2020, but he finished in third place, with less than 14 percent of the vote, divided among five candidates (the top-two vote-getters would be elected). During his tenure on the Montebello City Council, he served as Chairman of the ACE Project; Chairman of the Housing, Community and Economic Development Policy Committee for the League of California Cities; Chairman of the Committee on Homelessness for the Gateway Cities; and Board member for San Gabriel Valley Council of Governments and Gateway Cities Council of Governments.

Hadjinian currently serves on the Executive Council of the Western Prelacy of the Armenian Apostolic Church of America and the County of Los Angeles Commission on Alcohol and Other Drugs. He is a founding member of the Montebello-Stepanakert Sister City Association. He is also a member of the Armenian National Committee of America serving several local branches.
