= Armenian Genocide Museum of America =

Proposed museum in Washington, D.C., U.S.

Armenian Genocide Museum of America (AGMA)
- Planned location within Washington, D.C.
- Location: Washington, D.C., United States
- Coordinates: 38.898°N 77.0324°W
- Type: Armenian Genocide
- Public transit access: Metro Center; McPherson Square
- Website: www.armeniangenocidemuseum.org

Armenian Genocide Museum of America (AGMA) is a proposed Armenian museum in Washington, D.C., United States, run by the Armenian Genocide Museum and Memorial Inc. (AGM&M). The project was launched in 2000 and is yet to be finalized.

== Concept and organization ==
The idea to dedicate a building for commemorating the Armenian genocide was launched by Hirair Hovnanian and Anoush Mathevosian.

The project was run by the Armenian Assembly of America (AAA) from 2000 to 2003. In November 2003, the project was transferred to the Armenian Genocide Museum and Memorial Inc. (AGM&M), with the Armenian Assembly of America given a trusteeship position.

== Location ==
The Armenian Genocide Museum will be located in the historic former National Bank of Washington building, built in 1926 with a historic Interior and located on the southeast corner of 14th and G Streets, N.W., in downtown Washington, D.C. The building was purchased for $7.25 million, in addition to four adjacent properties, costing a total of $20 million. The site is two blocks from the White House and three blocks north of the National Mall.

== Funding ==
The main contributors as of September 2006 were:

- Armenian American philanthropist Gerard Cafesjian and the Cafesjian Family Foundation (CFF) – $14.4 million in funds and properties.
- Anoush Mathevosian – $3.5 million
- Hirair Hovnanian – $1.5 million

The official website of the museum sets the opening date as 2011. The project however has been marred by disagreements and a litigation between Cafesjian and the Cafesjian Family Foundation on the one side, and the other trustees on the other side. A trial was held in Washington, D.C. between March 9 and 29, 2011 before U.S. District Judge Colleen Kollar-Kotelly. After hearing witnesses and evidence, she issued a 190-page opinion and an order to the Armenian Genocide Museum and Memorial (AGM&M), Inc. to transfer the grant property back to the Cafesjian Family Foundation (CFF).

== Temporary exhibits ==
While still in its formative stage, the Museum participates in temporary exhibits.

== See also ==
- List of Armenian genocide memorials
