= Marseille Genocide Memorial =

Memorial to the Armenian genocide

Coordinates: 43°16′14″N 5°23′20″E

The Marseille Memorial is a steel obelisk commemorating the deaths of 1.5 million Armenians in Ottoman Empire during the Armenian genocide in 1915. The monument was dedicated in 1973 in Marseille, France.

France has a large Armenian community, with up to 600,000 people of Armenian descent.

The monument is located beside the Armenian church at the Avenue du Prado.

== See also ==
- Franco-Armenian relations
- List of Armenian genocide memorials
- Armenian genocide
- Armenian Genocide Remembrance Day
