= Istanbul Armenian Genocide memorial =

Coordinates: 41.04169°N 28.98767°E

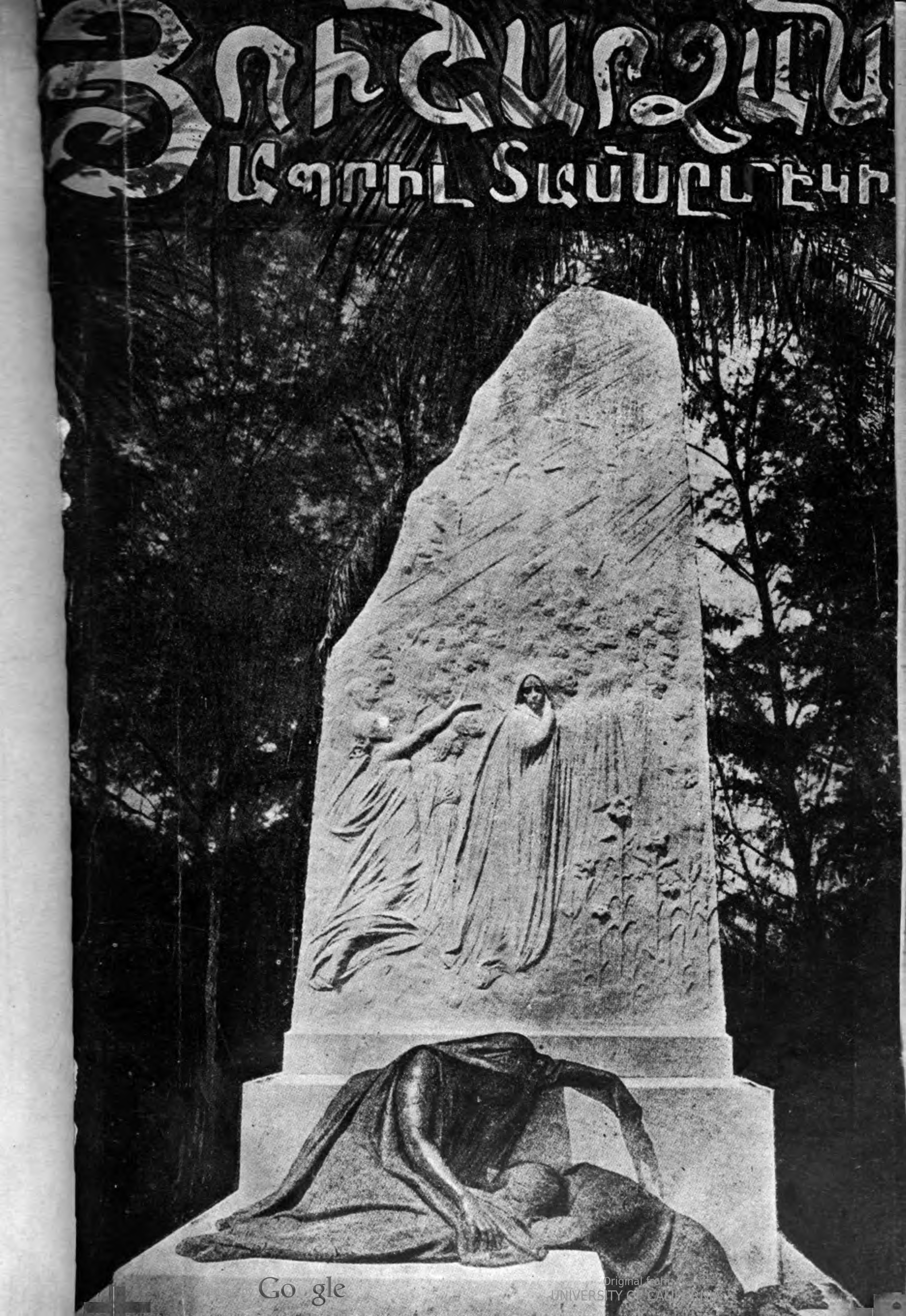
Photograph representing the Armenian Genocide memorial in Constantinople featured on the cover of a 1919 book by Teotig entitled Huşartsan

The Istanbul Armenian Genocide memorial (or hushardzan, in Armenian), according to some sources, was a monument that became the first memorial dedicated to the victims of the Armenian genocide. According to the relevant sources, it was erected in 1919 at a site now partly located within today's Gezi Park, near Taksim Square in Istanbul, Turkey. The monument was located on the premises of the former Pangaltı Armenian Cemetery. In 1922, during the Turkish National Movement, the monument was dismantled and subsequently lost under unknown circumstances.

== History ==
=== Background ===
The Armenian Genocide was the Ottoman government's systematic extermination of its minority Armenian subjects from their historic homeland within the territory constituting the present-day Republic of Turkey. The total number of people killed as a result has been estimated at between 1 and 1.5 million. In the aftermath of World War I, with the Ottoman Empire defeated, the Allied forces occupied various parts of the Ottoman Empire; the British seized control of Constantinople and the Bosporus. During this period, the first commemoration of the Armenian Genocide was organized on 24 April [O.S. 11 April], the day that marked the beginning of the deportation of Armenian intellectuals. The commemoration, organized by a group of Armenian Genocide survivors, was held in Istanbul in 1919 at the local Holy Trinity Armenian church. Many prominent figures in the Armenian community participated in the commemoration. Following its initial commemoration in 1919, the date became the annual day of remembrance for the Armenian Genocide.

=== Monument's inauguration ===
After the first commemoration, plans were implemented to build a monument dedicated to the victims of the genocide. A committee was formed to carry out the project. It was eventually erected in 1919 and was located on the premises of the Pangaltı Armenian Cemetery. The cemetery, which was to be later demolished and confiscated by the Turkish government in the 1930s, was located in today's Gezi Park near the Taksim Square in Istanbul. The monument became the first memorial dedicated to the victims of the Armenian Genocide.

In 1922, during the resurgence of the Turkish National Movement, the monument was dismantled and subsequently lost under unknown circumstances. According to historian Kevork Pamukçuyan, the base of the monument was last seen in the gardens of the Harbiye Military Barracks (which now houses the Istanbul Military Museum).

== Legacy ==
It is said that the monument was featured on the cover of a 1919 book dedicated to the memory of the victims of the genocide written by Teotig, the prominent Armenian writer and publisher.

During the Gezi Park protests, various activists demanded that the memorial be rebuilt. Cengiz Algan, a leading member of a NGO called "Dur De" (Say Stop), expressed his support to having the monument rebuilt by saying:

The Kemalists seized the land from the Armenians in the 1940s. The stairs of the Gezi Park were built from Armenian gravestones. The Armenians were killed. Yet tens of thousands have survived and they are trying to prove the tragedy of their ancestors on these lands. We intend to remind people about the Genocide, not to conceal the truth. We want to inform visitors of the Gezi Park that a monument to the Armenian Genocide victims stood here in 1919. And we hope that one day a new monument to the Genocide victims will be built in this place.

== Controversies ==
According to the article written by Garen Kazanc, published in armenianweekly.com on 5 December 2025, the photograph on the cover of Teotig's book belongs to the Rice and Isenberg Monument standing in the Lihue Cemetery in Kauaʻi, Hawaii and there is not any proof, no photograph nor report, that this monument was built.

== See also ==
- Armenians in Turkey
- Armenian Genocide Remembrance Day
- List of Armenian genocide memorials
