= Dark Pasts =

Book by historian Jennifer Dixon

Dark Pasts: Changing the State's Story in Turkey and Japan
- Author: Jennifer Dixon
- Language: English
- Genre: Non-fiction
- Publisher: Cornell University Press
- Publication date: 2018
- Publication place: United States

Dark Pasts: Changing the State's Story in Turkey and Japan (2018) is a book by historian Jennifer Dixon that discusses controversies around Japanese war crimes in World War II and the Armenian genocide denial in Turkey. According to Dixon, states tend to deny rather than glorify their past crimes due to international constraints.
