= Wales Genocide Memorial =

Memorial in Cardiff, Wales

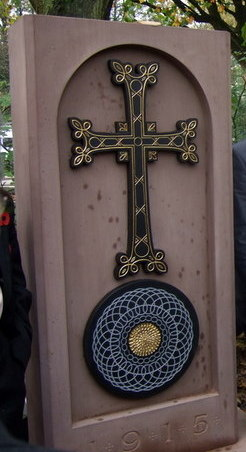
- Interactive map of Wales Genocide Memorial
- Location: Temple of Peace, Cardiff, Wales
- Coordinates: 51.487°N 3.183°W
- Type: Memorial
- Dedicated date: November 2, 2007
- Dedicated to: Victims of the Armenian genocide (1915-1922)

The Wales Genocide Memorial is a monument in the garden of the Temple of Peace in Cardiff, Wales, dedicated to the victims of the Armenian genocide that took place in Ottoman Empire carried out by the Turkish government against the Armenian population from 1915 to 1922.

== Unveiling ==
The memorial was erected and unveiled on November 2, 2007, at an initiative of the Wales-Armenian Society. The monument's opening was consecrated in a service conducted by Bishop Nathan Hovhannisian, Primate of the Armenian Apostolic Church of Great Britain. The ceremony was attended by Lord Dafydd Elis-Thomas Presiding Officer of the National Assembly of Wales, David Yeoman, the Assistant Bishop of Llandaff, and Vahe Gabrielyan, Armenian Ambassador to the UK.

Over 300 people attended the opening ceremony. Members of the Turkish community protested, saying the genocide never happened.

A trilingual inscription reads:

Welsh: Er cof am Ddioddefwyr Hil-laddiad yr Armeniaid
Armenian: Ի յիշատակ նահատակաց Հայոց Ցեղասպանութեան
English: In Memory of the Victims of the Armenian Genocide

== Desecration ==
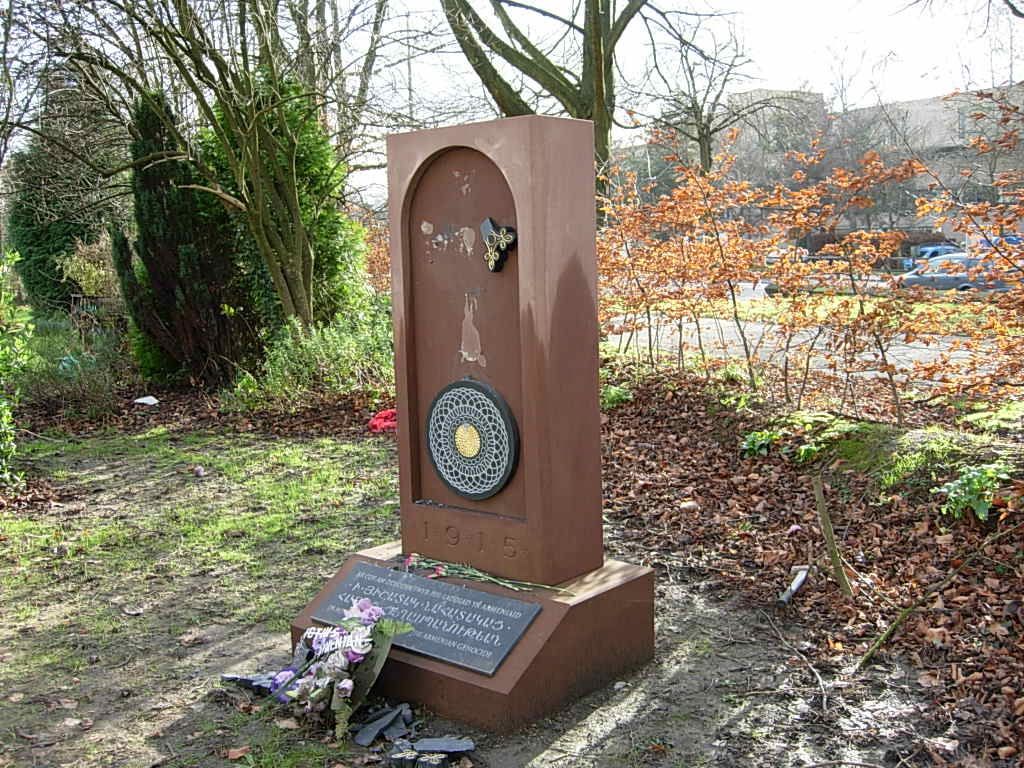
The memorial, desecrated in January 2008

In the early hours of January 27, 2008 the ornate Armenian Cross was smashed by a hammer, which was found at the scene. Eilian Williams of Wales Armenia Solidarity condemned the attack, which happened just hours before a memorial service could take place in remembrance of Holocaust, Armenian genocide and Hrant Dink.

Eilian Williams has said "We shall repair the cross again and again, no matter how often it is desecrated. We also challenge the UK government and the Turkish Embassy to condemn this racist attack."

== See also ==
- Armenian genocide
- List of Armenian genocide memorials
- Armenian Genocide Remembrance Day
