= Lyon Armenian Genocide Memorial =

Memorial in Lyon, France, to Armenians

Coordinates: 45.7564°N 4.8339°E

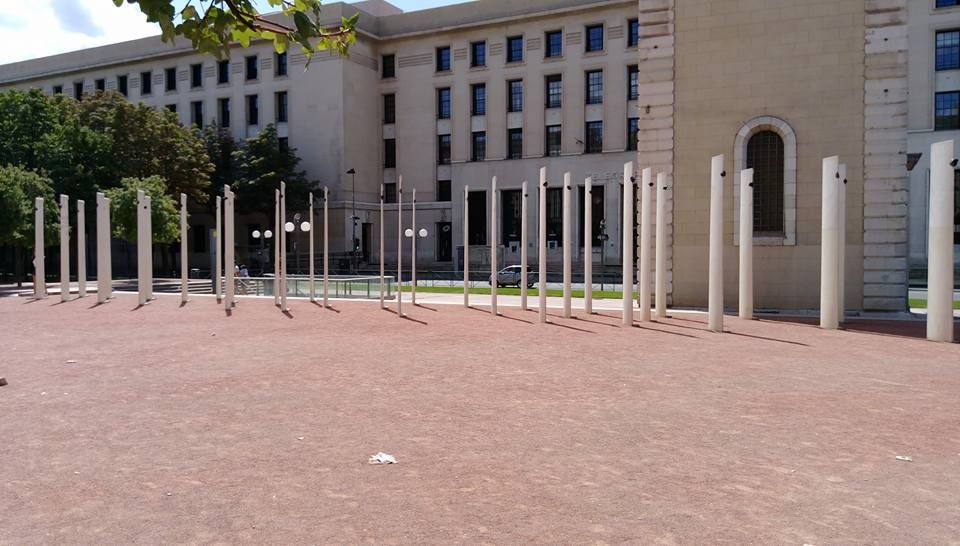
- Interactive map of the Lyon Armenian Genocide Memorial area

General information
- Location: Place Antonin-Poncet, Lyon, France
- Groundbreaking: 2006
- Opened: April 24, 2006
- Cost: €180,000

Design and construction
- Architect: Leonardo Basmadyian

Website
- memohaylyon.free.fr

Lyon Armenian Genocide Memorial (French: Memorial Lyonnais du genocide des Armeniens; Armenian: Հայոց ցեղասպանության հուշարձան) was erected in 2006 in central Lyon, France, in memory of the victims of the Armenian genocide in the Ottoman Empire in 1915 and the following years.

The memorial is located near Place Bellecour, the main square of Lyon. It was designed by Leonardo Basmadyian and includes 36 white concrete pieces supported by stones from Armenia. Poems of Kostan Zarian are written on the concrete pieces.

The cost of the memorial is around 180,000 euros, over two-thirds of which was provided by the Armenian community of Lyon. The rest was given by the Lyon Municipality and actively supported by Mayor Gérard Collomb.

== Controversy ==
Members of the Turkish community of France and local Turkish organizations protested the construction of the memorial. The Council of Turkish Culture Associations in Rhone-Alpes applied to the French court to overturn construction of the memorial, however, the court upheld the decision. On March 18, 2006, about 3,000 Turks organized a protest against the memorial.

The local branch of the opposition Union for a Popular Movement also stood against the construction of the memorial.

== Vandalism ==
On April 17, 2006, just a week before its official inauguration, the memorial was vandalized. Graffiti denying the fact of the genocide ("There was no genocide") were sprayed on the memorial. The memorial was again vandalized in August 2007.

In March 2015, the memorial was vandalized with profane words spray-painted on its facade. On November 1, 2020, amid the Nagorno-Karabakh war the memorial was vandalized with pro-Erdogan inscriptions and insults by Turkish ultranationalist group Grey Wolves. Following the vandalisation, France banned the Grey Wolves and enhanced security near Armenian schools and churches in Lyon.

== Inauguration ==
The memorial was officially inaugurated on April 24, 2006, on the 91st anniversary of the Armenian Genocide.

Maximum security measures were taken on the day with over 200 national law enforcement officers (Brigade anti-criminalité, Direction centrale des renseignements généraux) and 25 municipal policemen guarding the surrounding area. The area was also closed for traffic.

Up to 4,000 people, including the Armenian Ambassador in France marched to the memorial. French Minister of Transport Dominique Perben and the UMP candidate for Lyon Mayor represented President Jacques Chirac at the opening ceremony.

== See also ==
- List of Armenian genocide memorials
