= Armenian Heritage Park =

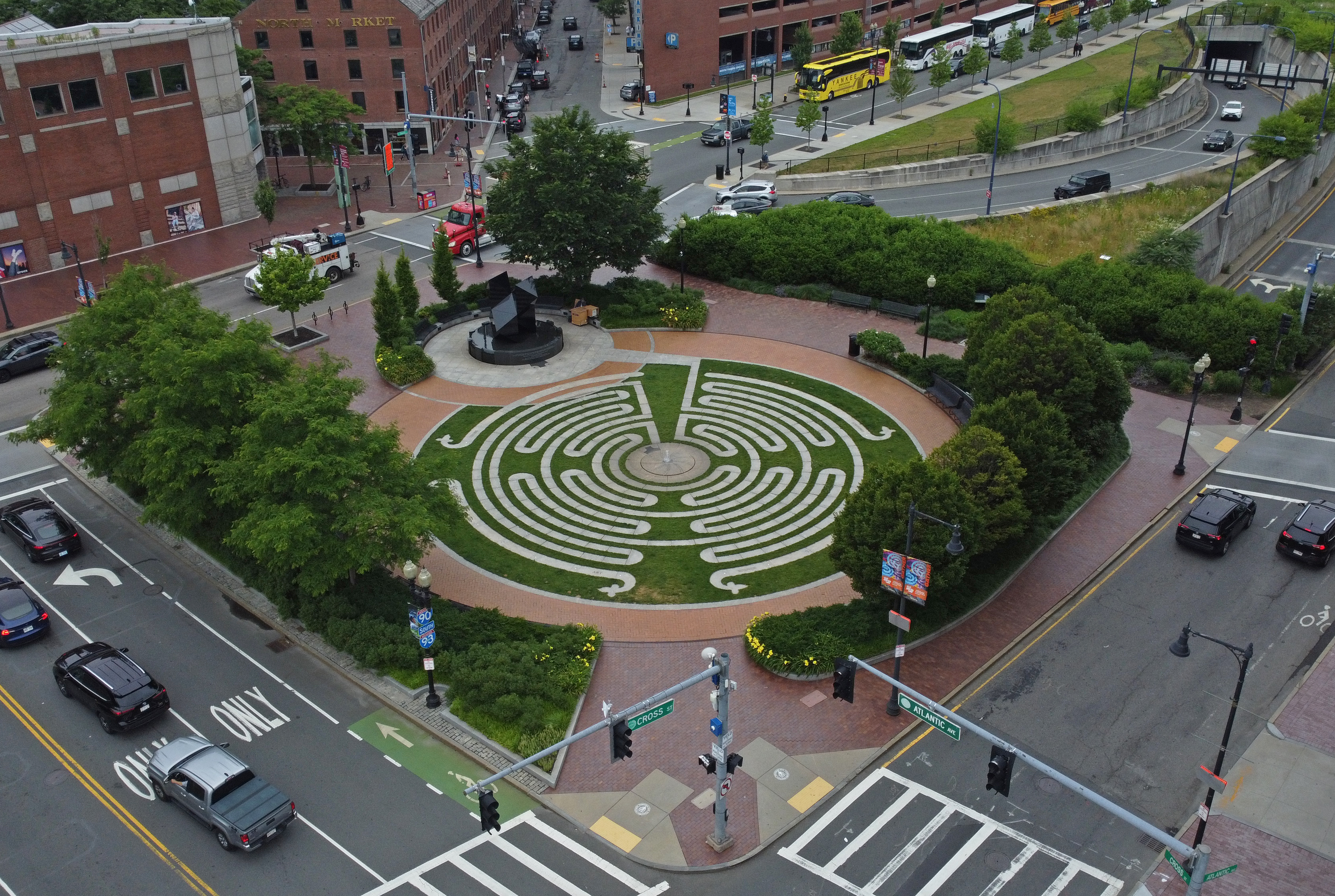
- An aerial view of the park

- Location within Boston

General information
- Type: Park
- Location: Rose Fitzgerald Kennedy Greenway, Boston, Massachusetts, United States
- Coordinates: 42.361081°N 71.053219°W
- Groundbreaking: September 9, 2010
- Opened: May 22, 2012
- Cost: $5–6 million includes endowed programs including the Park's care

Website
- www.armenianheritagepark.org

Armenian Heritage Park is a memorial park dedicated to the victims of the Armenian genocide located on Parcel 13 on the Rose Kennedy Greenway between Faneuil Hall Marketplace and Christopher Columbus Park in Boston, Massachusetts.

The Park includes an abstract sculpture, a split dodecahedron, that sits on a reflecting pool.

The abstract sculpture has 24–26 different configurations, which symbolize the dispersion and coming together of immigrants from different shores. The abstract sculpture is dedicated to lives lost during the Armenian genocide of 1915–1923 and all genocides that have followed.

The other part of it is a grass labyrinth that not only pays tribute to the contribution to the United States, but also represents the journey of life.

The Armenian Heritage Foundation, composed of dozens of Armenian American religious, cultural, and other organizations from around Massachusetts, raised from $5 million to $6 million for the park.

The groundbreaking ceremony on September 9, 2010, was attended by Governor Deval Patrick, Karekin II, Catholicos of All Armenians, Registrar of Motor Vehicles Rachel Kaprielian, Sheriff of Middlesex County Peter Koutoujian, Boston Mayor Thomas Menino and many Armenian-American citizens and City and Commonwealth officials. Governor Patrick said that the park will be a "beautiful addition to the Greenway as well as a testament to the heritage of Armenian-Americans and Massachusetts' larger immigrant history". Mayor Menino also noted that the park "celebrates the distinctive history of the City of Boston and the generations of immigrants who have made Boston the wonderfully diverse community it is today".

Construction of the park was expected to be completed within 12 months, but actually lasted over a year and the park was opened on May 22, 2012. Armenian Minister of Foreign Affairs Eduard Nalbandyan and Governor Deval Patrick joined hundreds of attendees from the Armenian community at the dedication of the park.

Joanna Weiss, columnist for The Boston Globe, wrote in a 2015 opinion piece that the sculpture "might well be the gem of the Greenway: an example of public art that is both permanent and alive."

On July 31, 2022, Armenian singer-songwriter Maléna, winner of the Junior Eurovision Song Contest 2021, performed her winning track "Qami Qami" at the park.

== Gallery ==
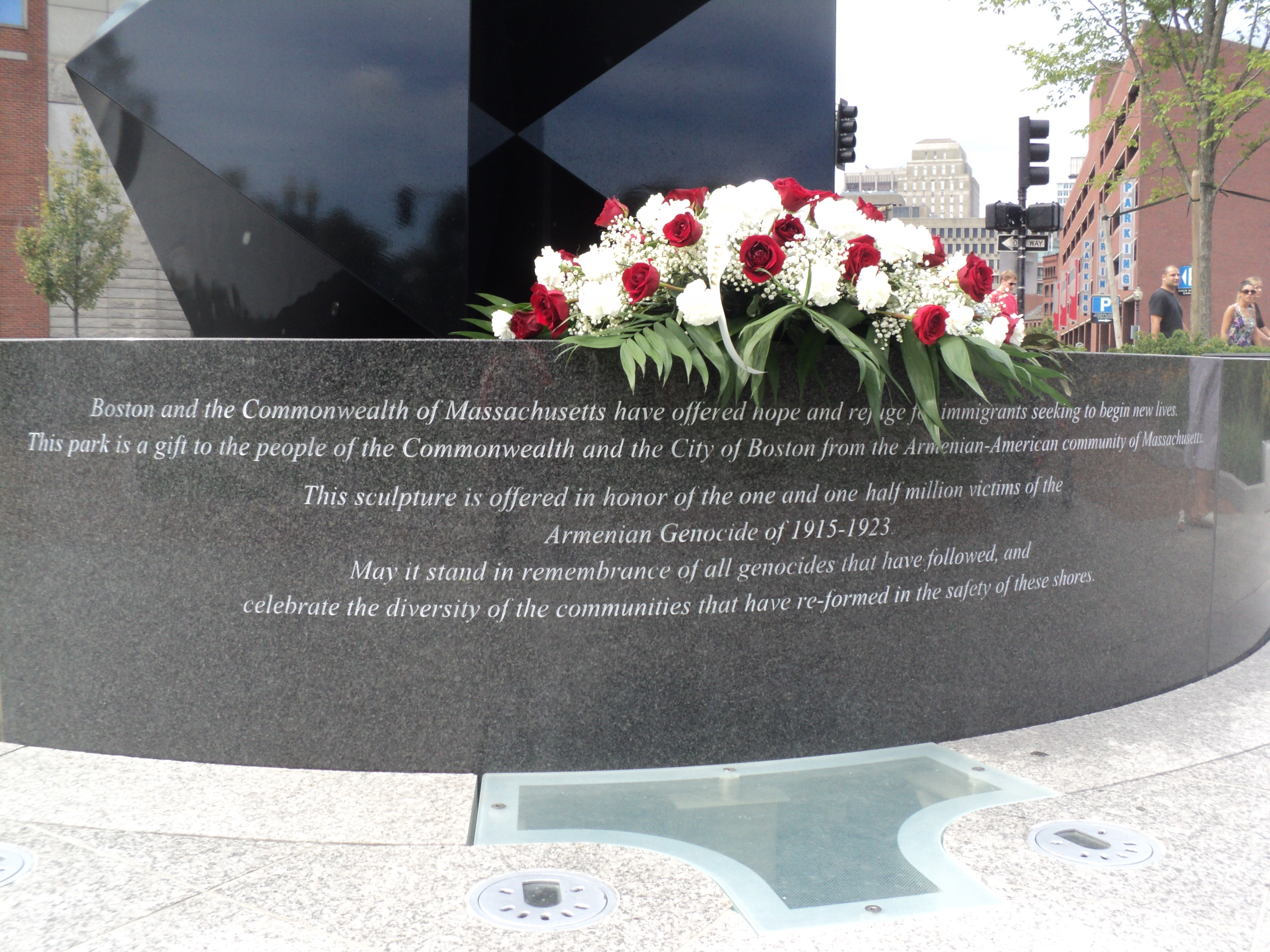
The inscription.

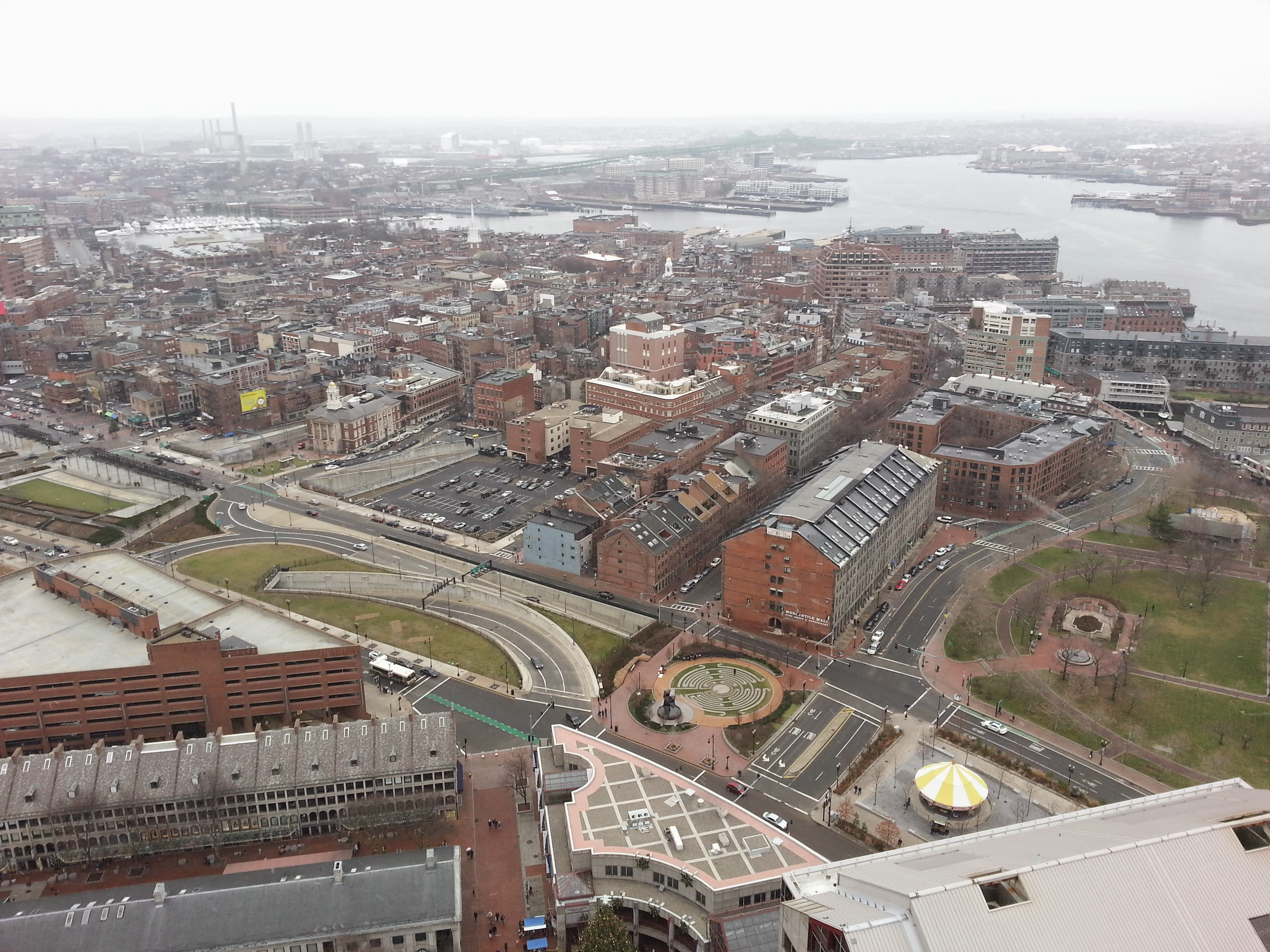
View from the Boston Custom House Tower.

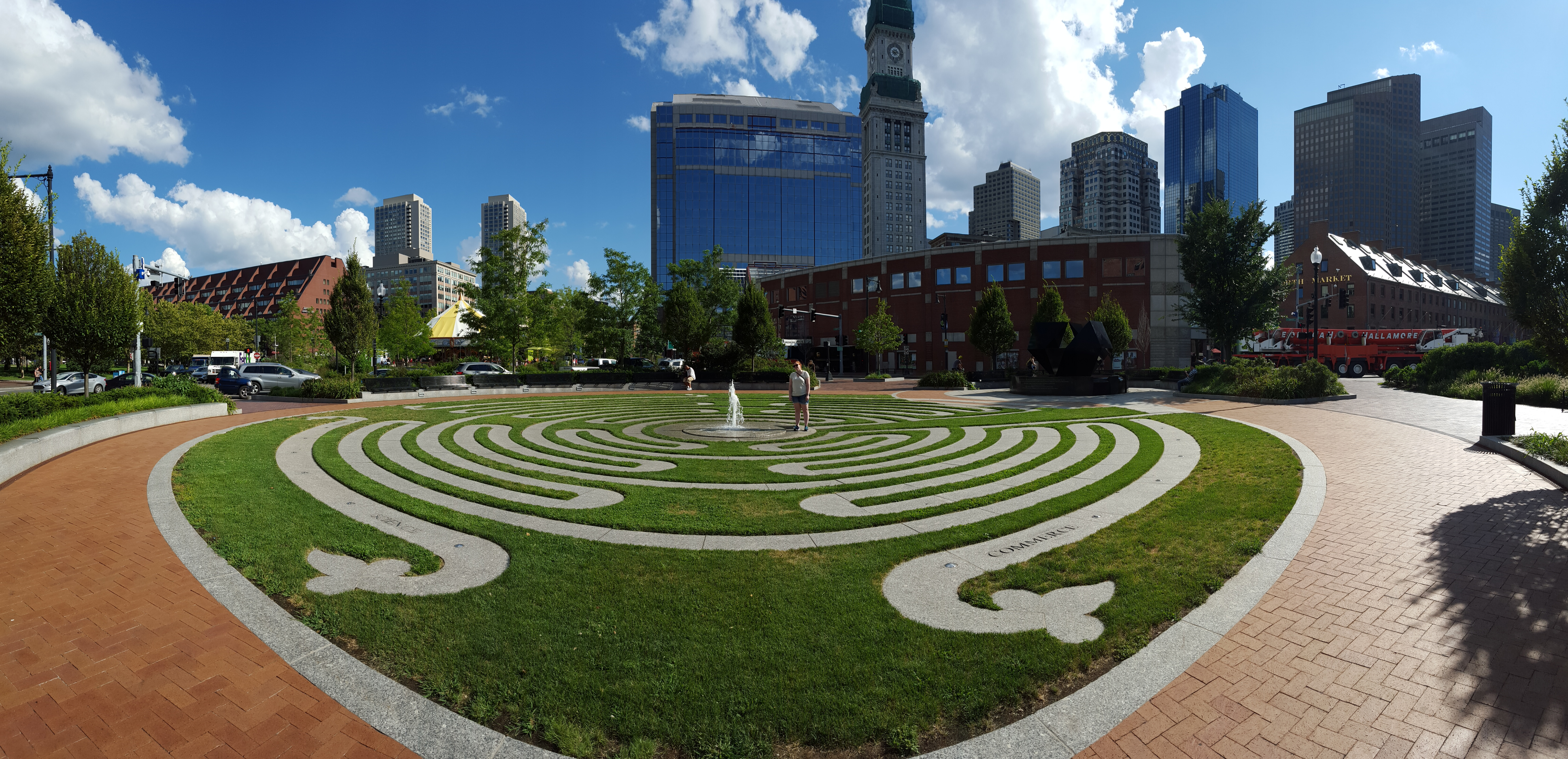
Panorama view, 2015

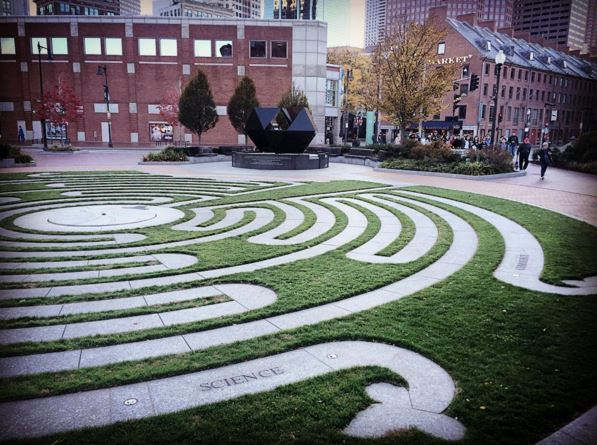
Armenian Heritage Park with North Market in background.

== See also ==
- List of Armenian genocide memorials
- Armenian American
- List of places named after Armenia
