= List of Armenian genocide memorials =

Armenian genocide memorials

A number of organizations, museums, and monuments are intended to serve as memorials to the Armenian genocide and its over 1 million victims.

Turkey has campaigned against the establishment of such memorials. In 1983, Israeli diplomat Alon Liel reported that he was told by a representative of the Turkish Foreign Ministry that "Turkey will not accept the establishment of an Armenian Memorial in Israel. Establishing such a monument would jeopardize the relations between the two countries and might push them to the point of no return."

== List ==
The following table shows the major memorials around the world dedicated to the memory of the Armenian genocide victims.

Image	Memorial	Country	Location	Date
	Huşartsan Memorial (Turkish: Taksim Ermeni Soykırımı Anıtı)	Turkey	Taksim Square, Allied-occupied Constantinople (modern-day Istanbul, Turkey)	1919–1922
	Armenian Genocide Memorial	Mexico	Mexico City	1930
	Memorial Chapel	Lebanon	Armenian Catholicossate of Cilicia, Antelias	1938
	Armenian Genocide Memorial	Brazil	São Paulo	1965
	Armenian Genocide Memorial	India	Kolkata, West Bengal	1965
	Memorial khachkar	Armenia	Etchmiadzin Cathedral compound, Vagharshapat	1965
	Armenian Genocide Memorial	United States	Watertown, Massachusetts	1965
	Armenian Genocide Memorial	Lebanon	Bikfaya	1965
	Tsitsernakaberd (Armenian Genocide Museum-Institute)	Armenia	Yerevan	1967
	Armenian Genocide Martyrs Monument	United States	Montebello, California	1968
	Marseille Genocide Memorial (avenue du Prado)	France	Marseille	1973
	Armenian Genocide Memorial	Iran	Saint Sarkis Cathedral, Tehran	1973
	Armenian Genocide Memorial	Iran	Holy Savior Cathedral, New Julfa, Isfahan	1975
	Armenian Martyrs Memorial	Uruguay	St. Nerses Shnorhali Church, Montevideo	1975
	Armenian Martyrs' Monument	United States	Wesley Bolin Memorial Plaza, Phoenix, Arizona	1978
	Armenian Genocide memorial	United States	Philadelphia, Pennsylvania	1980s
	Armenian Genocide Memorial	Argentina	Buenos Aires	1983
	Armenian Genocide Memorial Complex	Syria	Der Zor	1990–2014
	Armenian Genocide Monument	Cyprus	Nicosia	1990
	Armenian Genocide memorial	Syria	Cathedral of the Forty Martyrs, Aleppo	28 May 1991
	Armenian Genocide memorial	Belgium	Ixelles	1995
	Armenian Genocide Monument on Mt. Davidson	United States	San Francisco, California	1997
	Armenian Genocide Memorial	Canada	Marcelin-Wilson Park, Montreal, Quebec	1998
	Armenian Martyrs Memorial	United States	Providence, Rhode Island	1999
	Holy Resurrection Church (site of mass grave in the Syrian desert discovered in the early 90s)	Syria	Margadeh village	1999
	Mother Arising Out of the Ashes, memorial statue	Armenia	Tsitsernakaberd Memorial Park, Yerevan	2002
	Memorial to Père Komitas and victims of the Armenian Genocide	France	Jardin D'Erevan, Paris	2003
	Marseille Genocide Memorial (avenue du 24 avril 1915)	France	Marseille	2006
	Armenian Martyrs Memorial on the grounds of Saints Vartanantz Armenian Orthodox Church	United States	Chelmsford, Massachusetts	2005
	Khachkar in Nelson-Mandela-Park	Germany	Bremen	2005
	Lyon Armenian Genocide Memorial	France	Lyon	2006
	Armenian Genocide Memorial	Cyprus	Larnaca	2008
	Armenian Heritage Park	United States	Boston, Massachusetts	2012
	Genocidemonument	the Netherlands	Almelo	2014
	Armenian Genocide Monument	United States	California State University, Fresno, Fresno, California	2015
	Khachkar memorial to the 1915 Armenian Genocide	Ireland	Christ Church Cathedral, Dublin	2015
	Mechelen Armenian Genocide Memorial	Belgium	Mechelen	2015
	Memorial in memory of 1.5 million victims of the Armenian Genocide committed by the Government of Ottoman Empire in 1915-1923	Israel	Petah Tikva	2019
	The Eternal Flame	United Kingdom	Ealing, London	2023

== Other ==
Other notable monuments, squares, and memorials of the Armenian genocide include:

- A memorial khatchkar at the Armenian Catholic Patriarchate in Bzoummar, Lebanon (1960)
- The Armenian Genocide Monument in Buenos Aires, Argentina (1985)
- Relief at the Armenian Catholic Patriarchate in Bzoummar, Lebanon (1993)
- The Armenian Monument in De Boskamp cemetery, Assen, Netherlands (24 April 2001)
- The memorial monument in Rome, Italy (2006)
- The Wales Genocide Memorial in Cardiff, Wales, (2007)
- The memorial monument in Mislata, Valencia, Spain (2010)
- The Memorial monument at the Saint Abgar Church, Scottsdale, Arizona (2011)
- Armenian Genocide Memorial Square in Los Angeles, not yet finished
- Armenian Genocide Museum of America, not yet opened
- The memorial monument in Petržalka, Bratislava, Slovakia (2011)
- The memorial monument in Košice, Slovakia (2016)
- Mémorial du génocide arménien de Décines-Charpieuat, Rue du 24 Avril 1915 in Décines-Charpieu, France
- Armenian Genocide Memorial, Paul Mistral Park, Grenoble, France
- Memorial, Rue du Génocide Arménien, Chasse-sur-Rhône, Auvergne-Rhône-Alpes, France
- Armenians, Greeks and Assyrians Genocide monument, Memorial park, Berlin, Germany
- Armenian Genocide Memorial, Nairyan Street, Seven, Armenia
- Cross stone memorial monument in Nîmes, France (2022)
- Armenian Genocide Square in Haifa, Israel (2023)
- Armenian Genocide Memorial Monument Costa Mesa, California (2015)

== Gallery ==
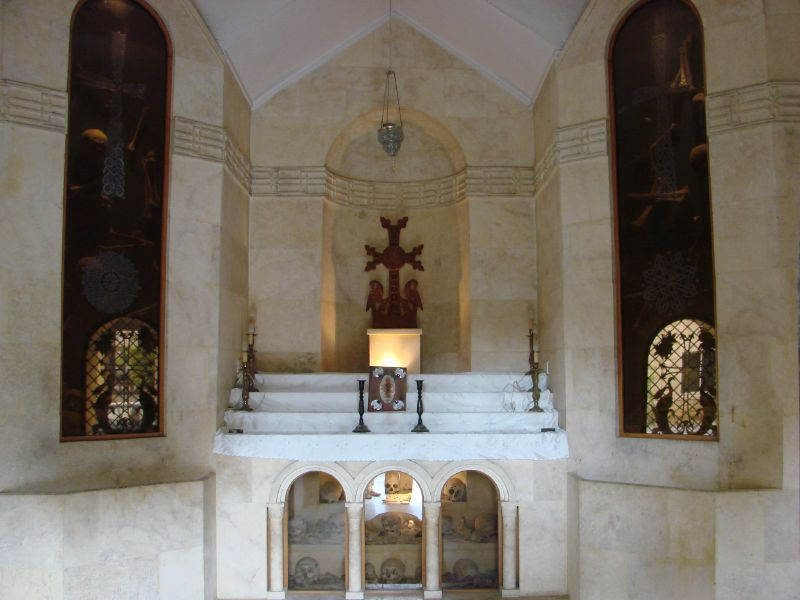
Inside the memorial chapel in Antelias: the remains of victims recovered from the Syrian desert

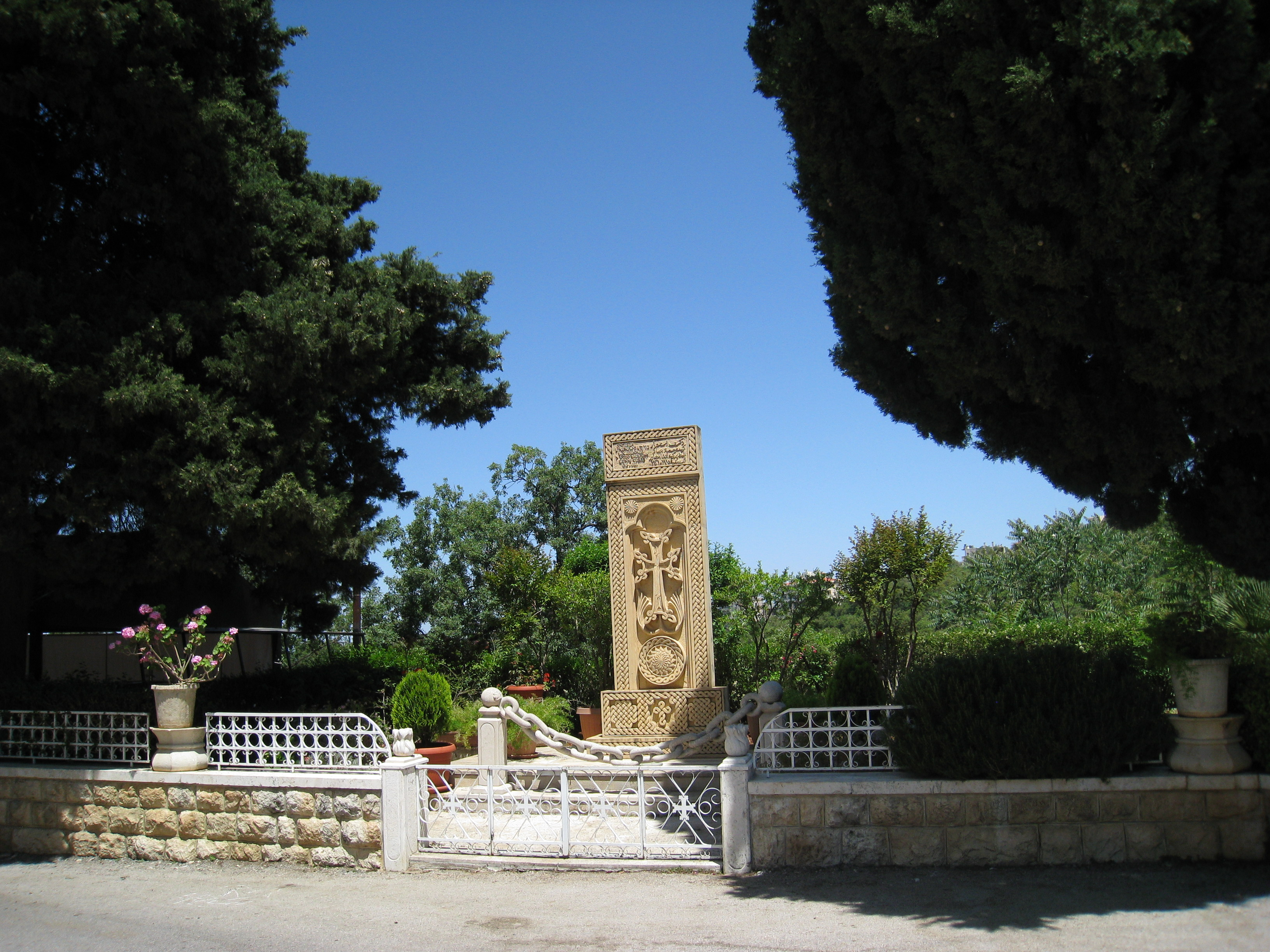
Memorial khatchkar at the Armenian Catholic Patriarchate in Bzoummar, Lebanon (1960)

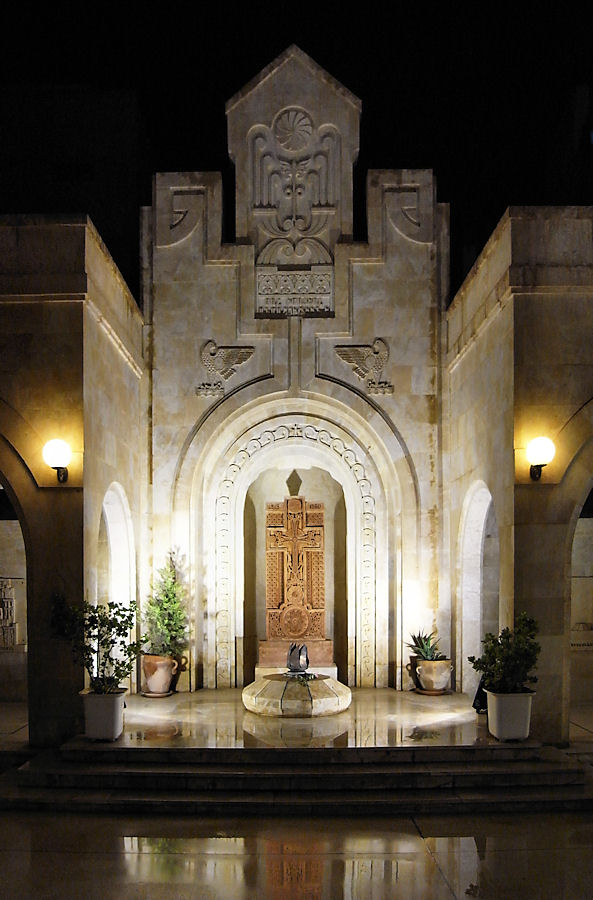
Memorial at the Genocide complex in Deir ez-Zor, Syria. (1991)

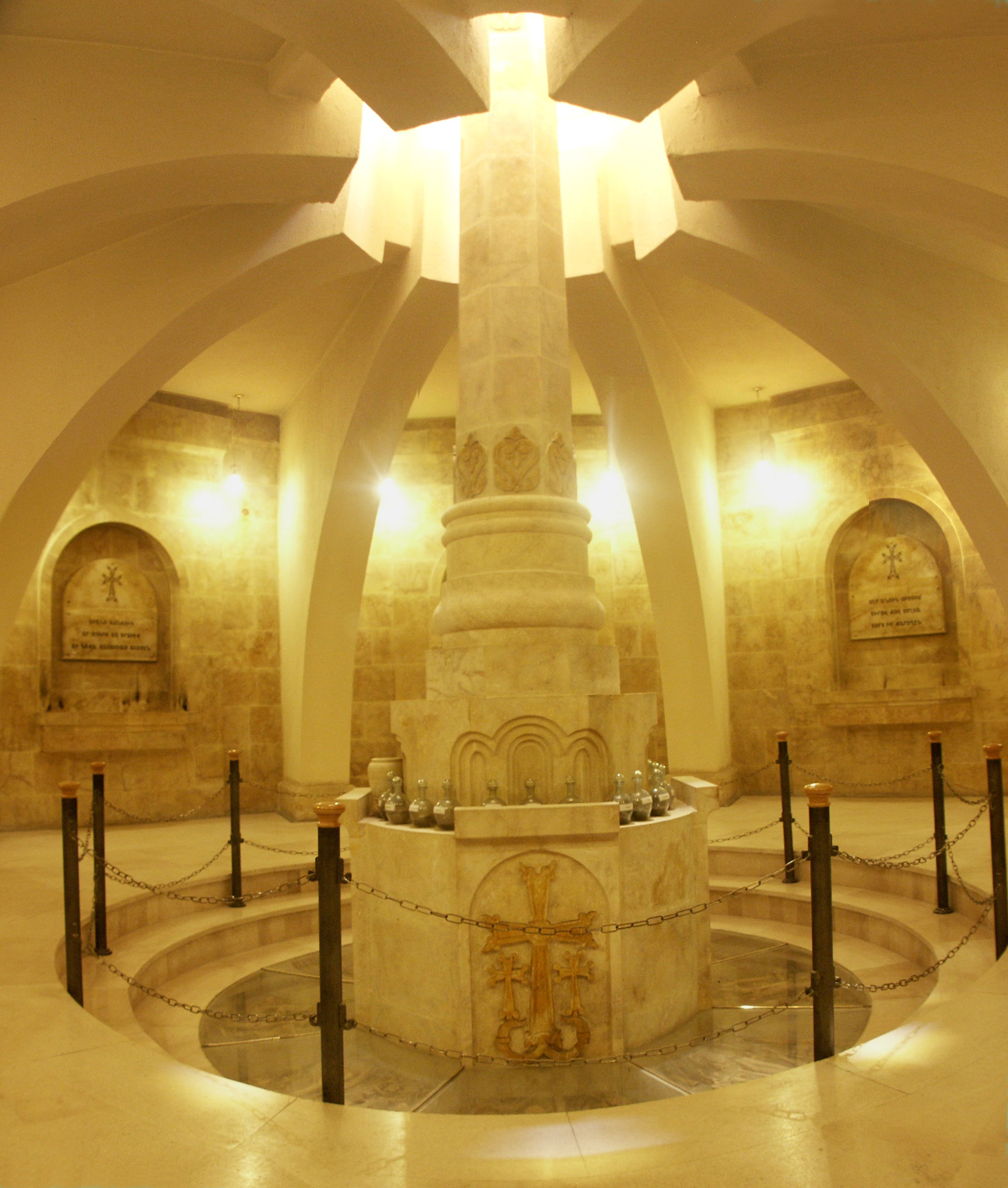
The Armenian Genocide museum at Der Zor, Syria.

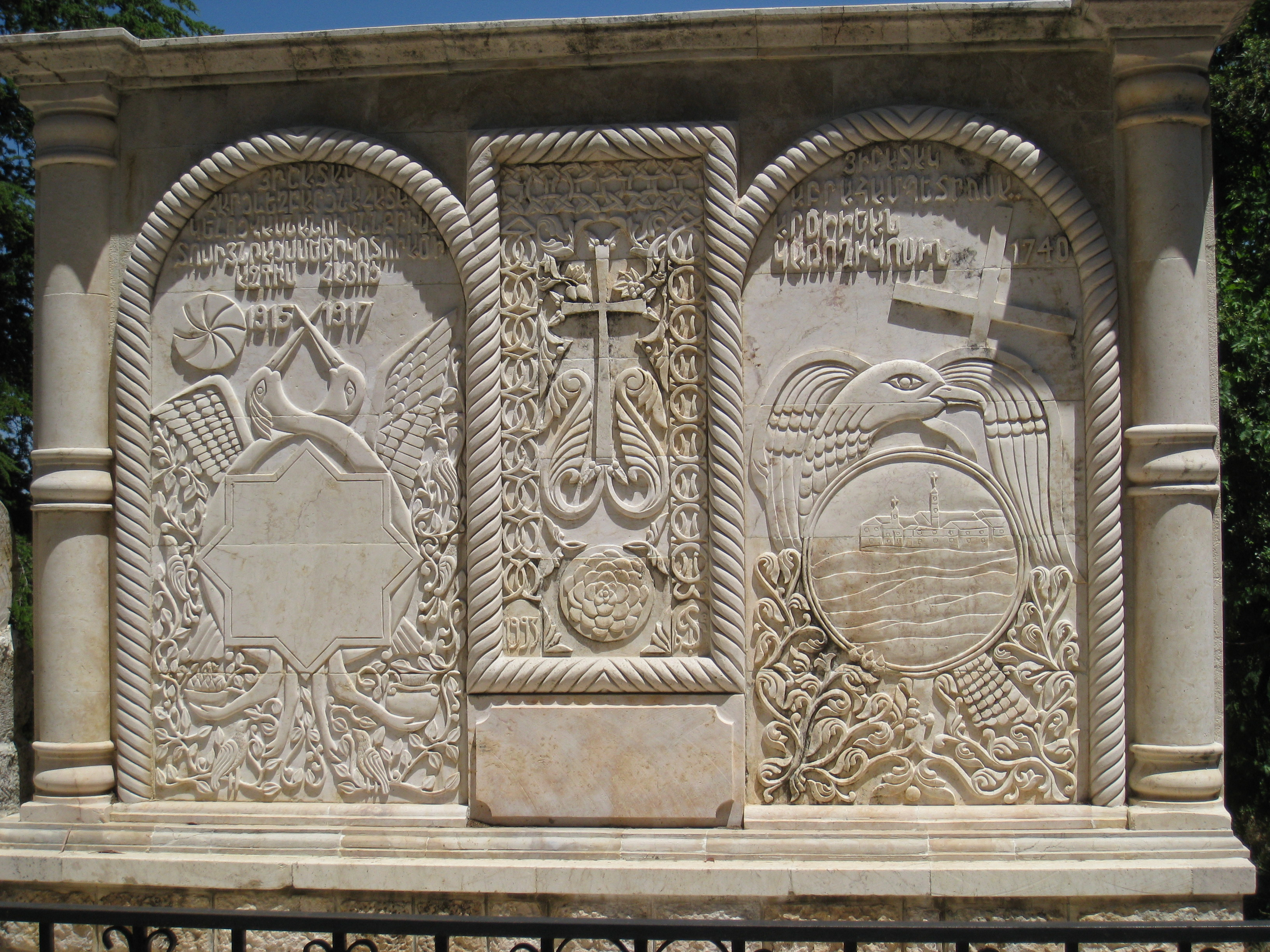
Relief at the Armenian Catholic Patriarchate in Bzoummar, Lebanon (1993)

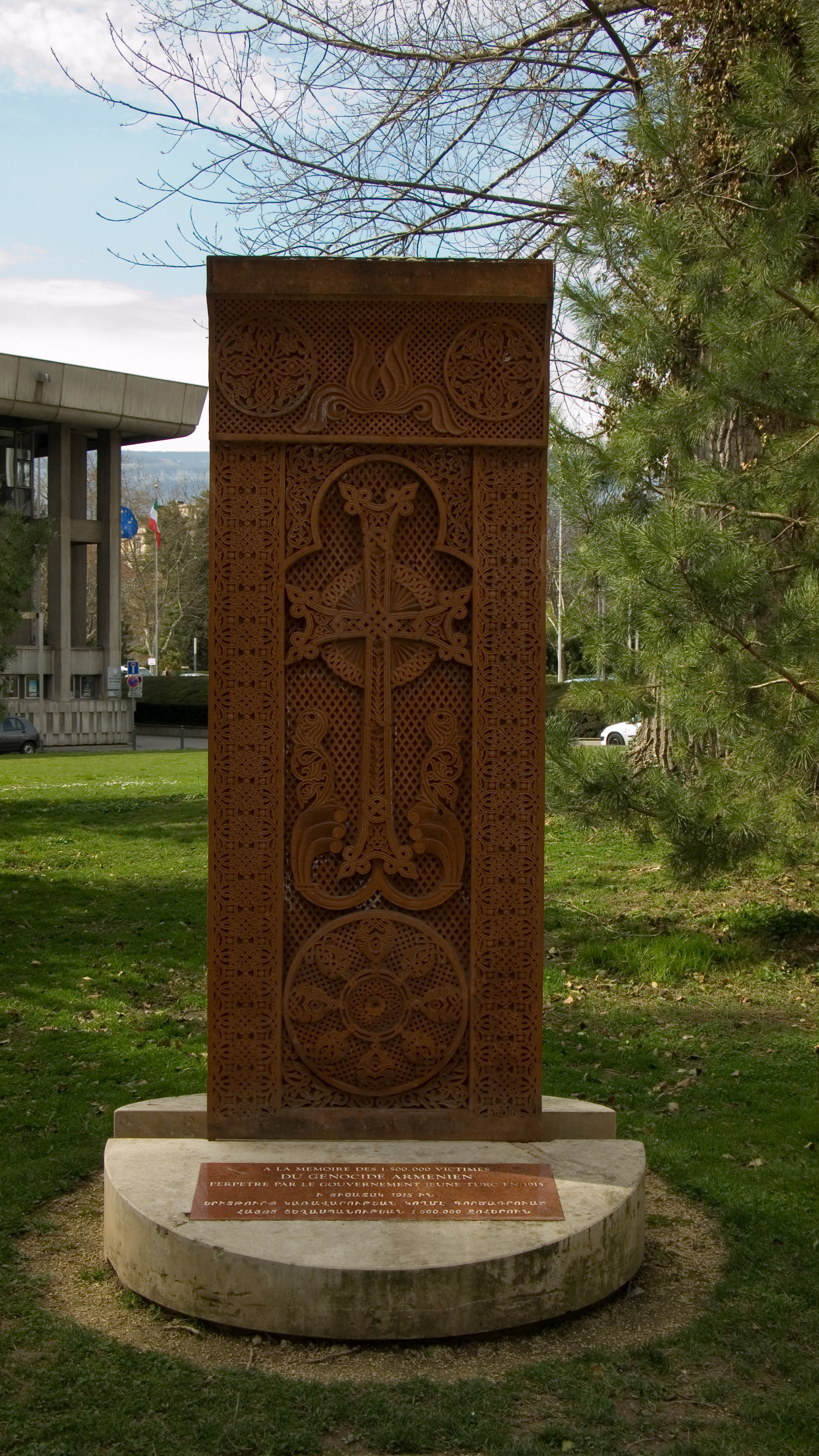
Memorial cross stone in Grenoble, France (1999)

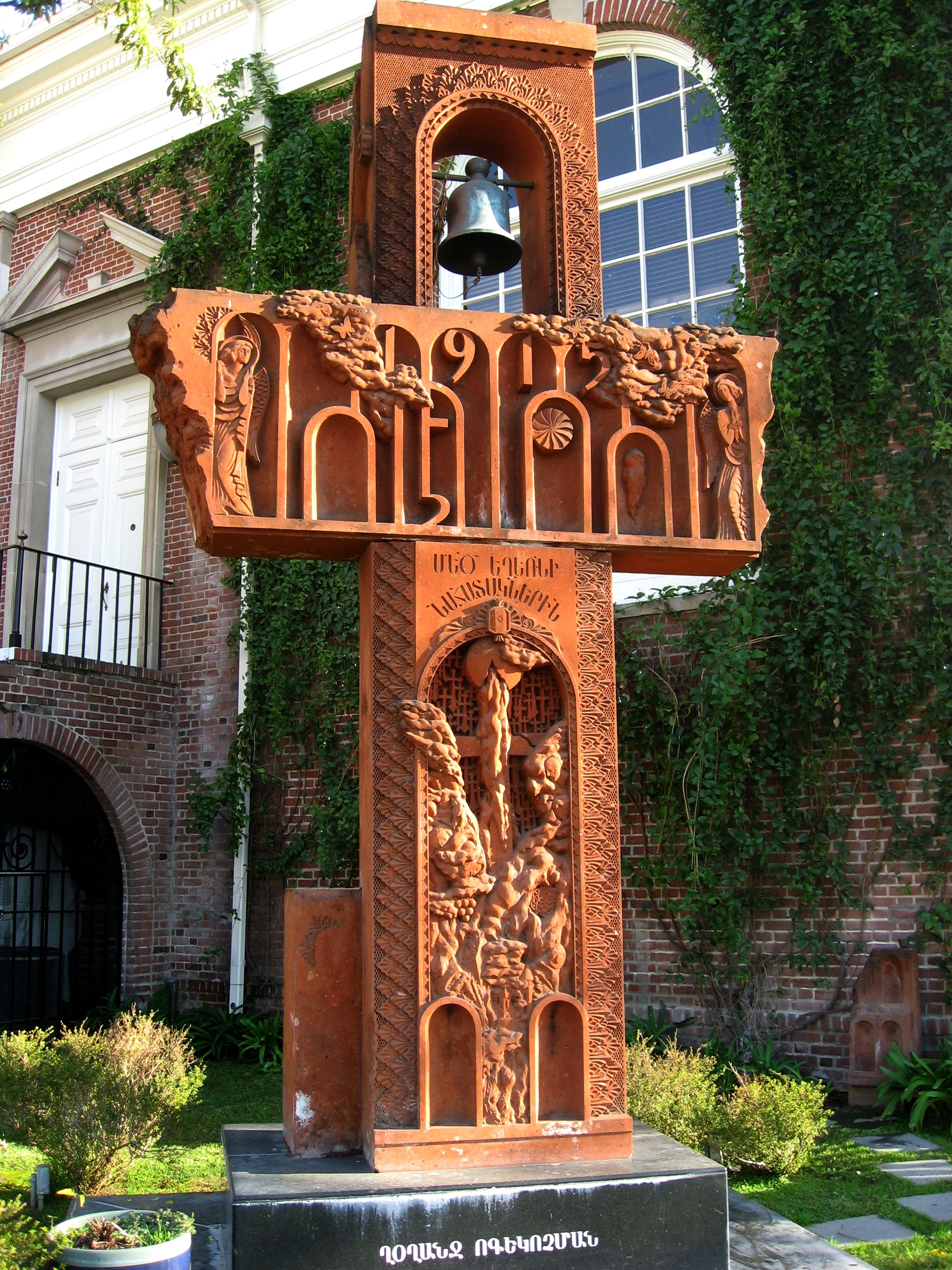
Memorial khatchkar at Saint Mary's Armenian Apostolic Church in Glendale, California (2000)

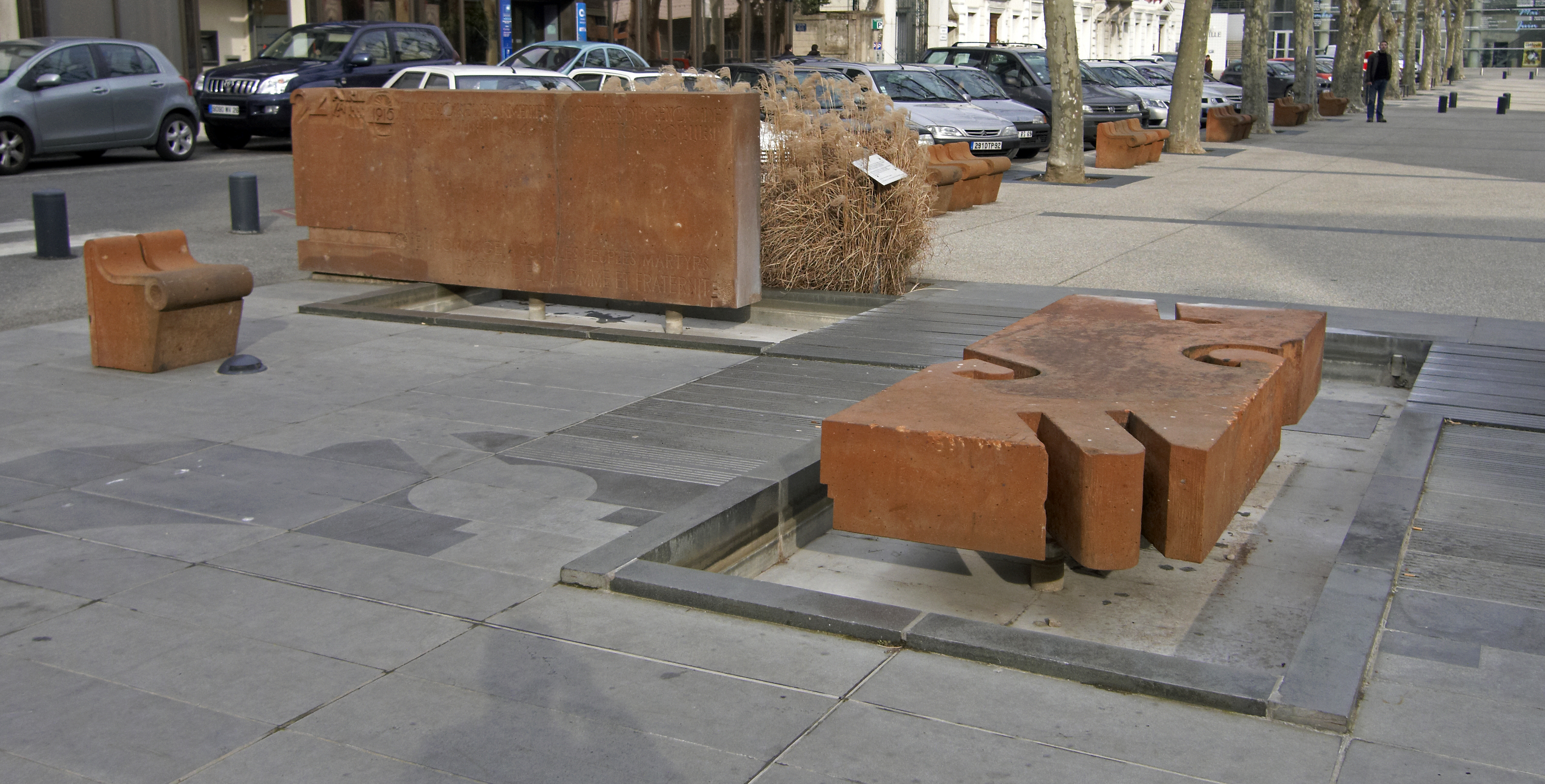
Memorial monument in Romans-sur-Isère, France

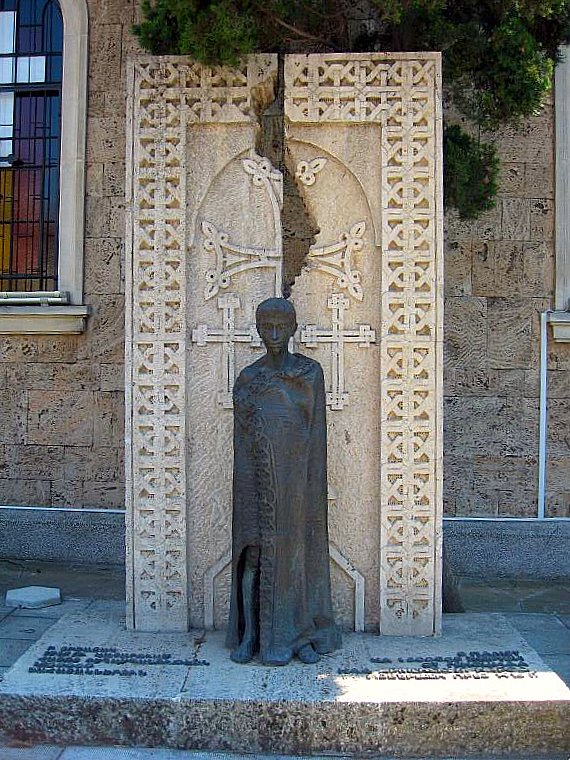
Memorial in Burgas, Bulgaria

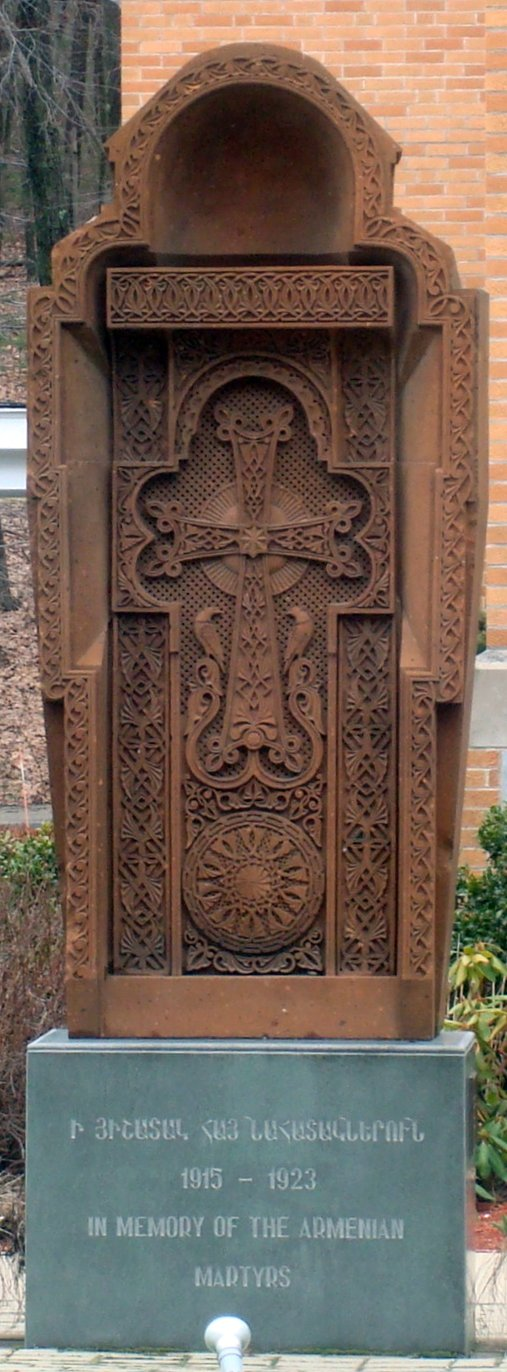
Memorial khatchkar (stone cross) in Whitinsville, Massachusetts

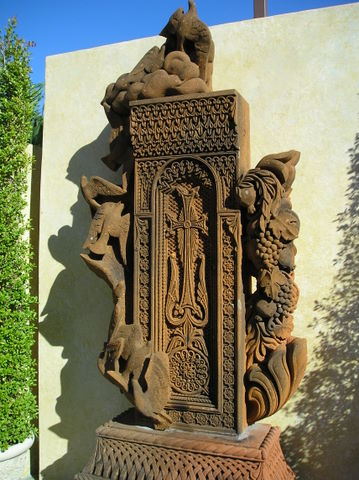
Memorial cross stone in Boca Raton, Florida

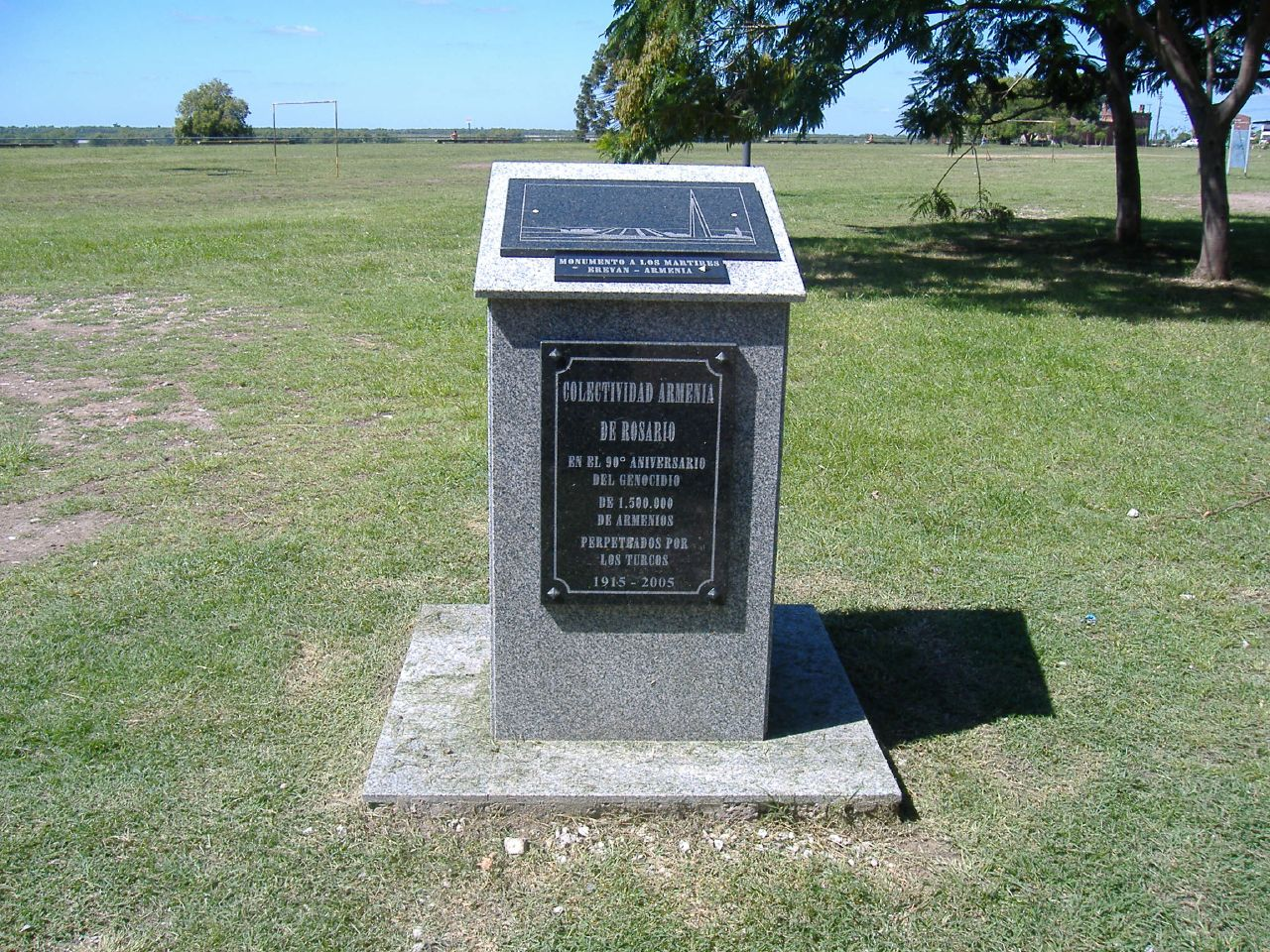
Memorial in Rosario, Argentina

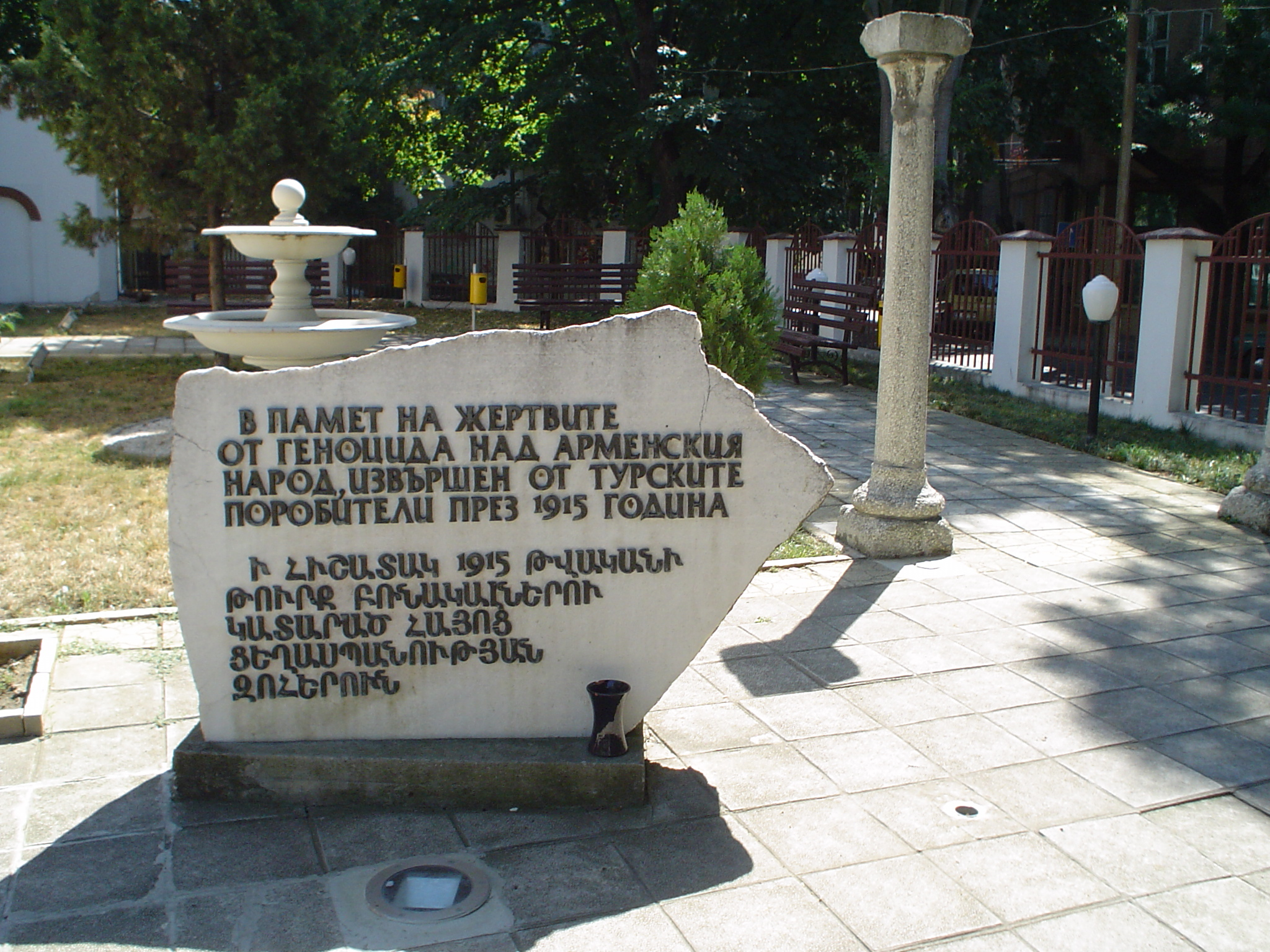
Memorial in Varna, Bulgaria

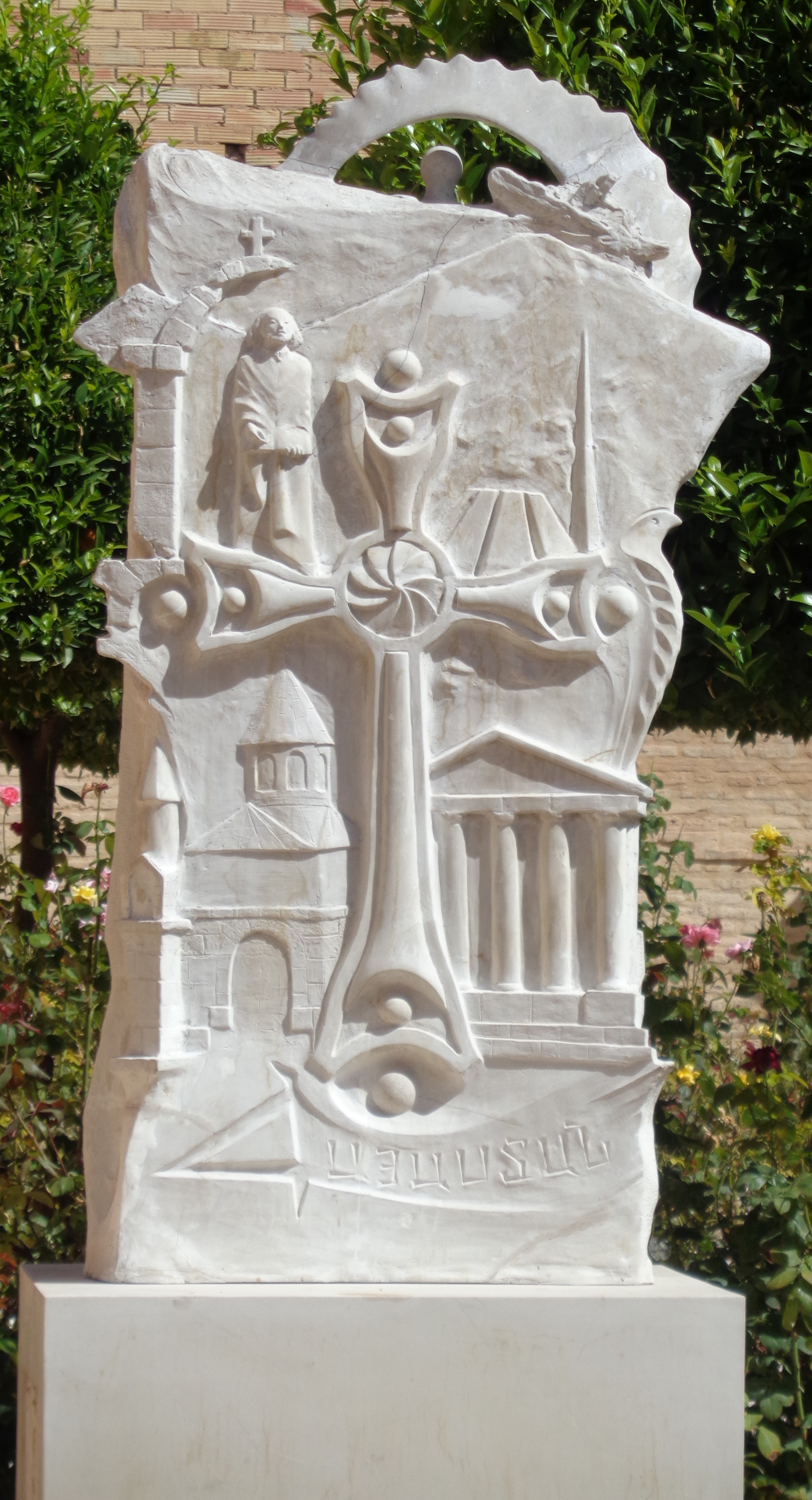
In 2010 was erected in Mislata (Valencia) in Spain the first monument commemorating the Armenian genocide. The sculpture, three meters high, is in the gardens of the Garden of Sendra, in the old town.

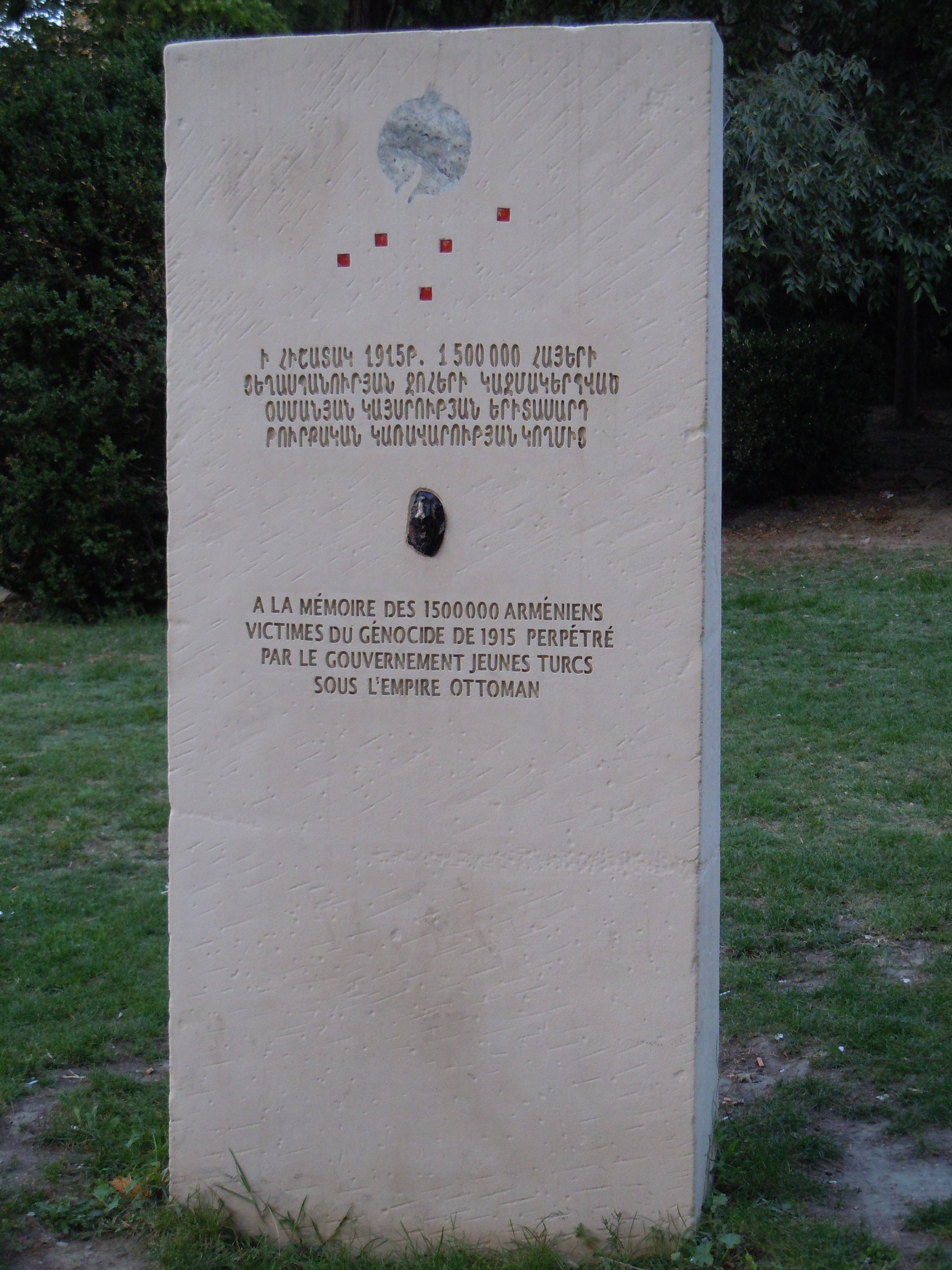
Translation - To the memory of 1,500,000 Armenians, victims of the 1915 genocide perpetrated by the government of the young Turks in the Ottoman Empire - this memorial is in Arles, Provence, France.

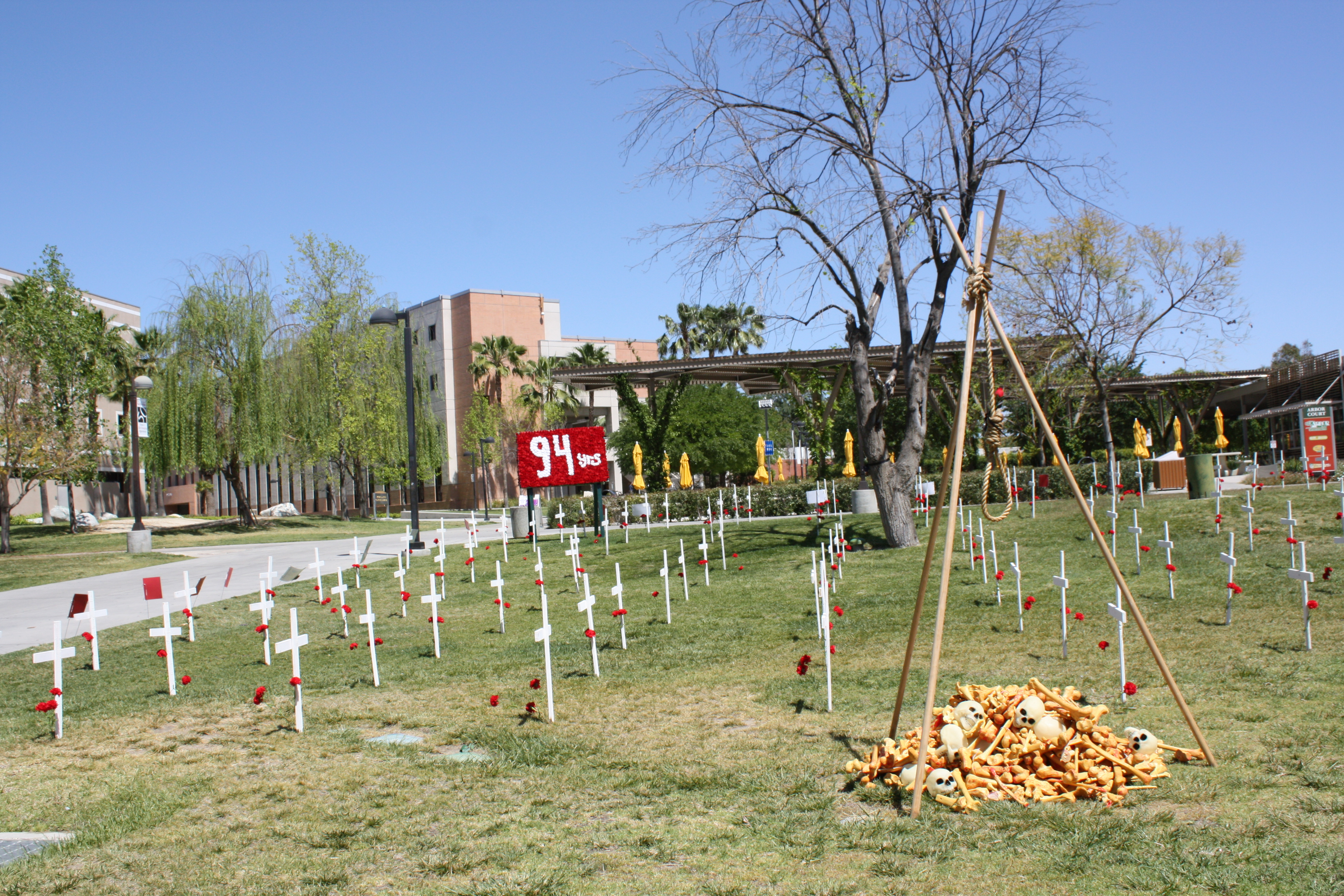
For the 94th anniversary at the California State University, Northridge (2009)

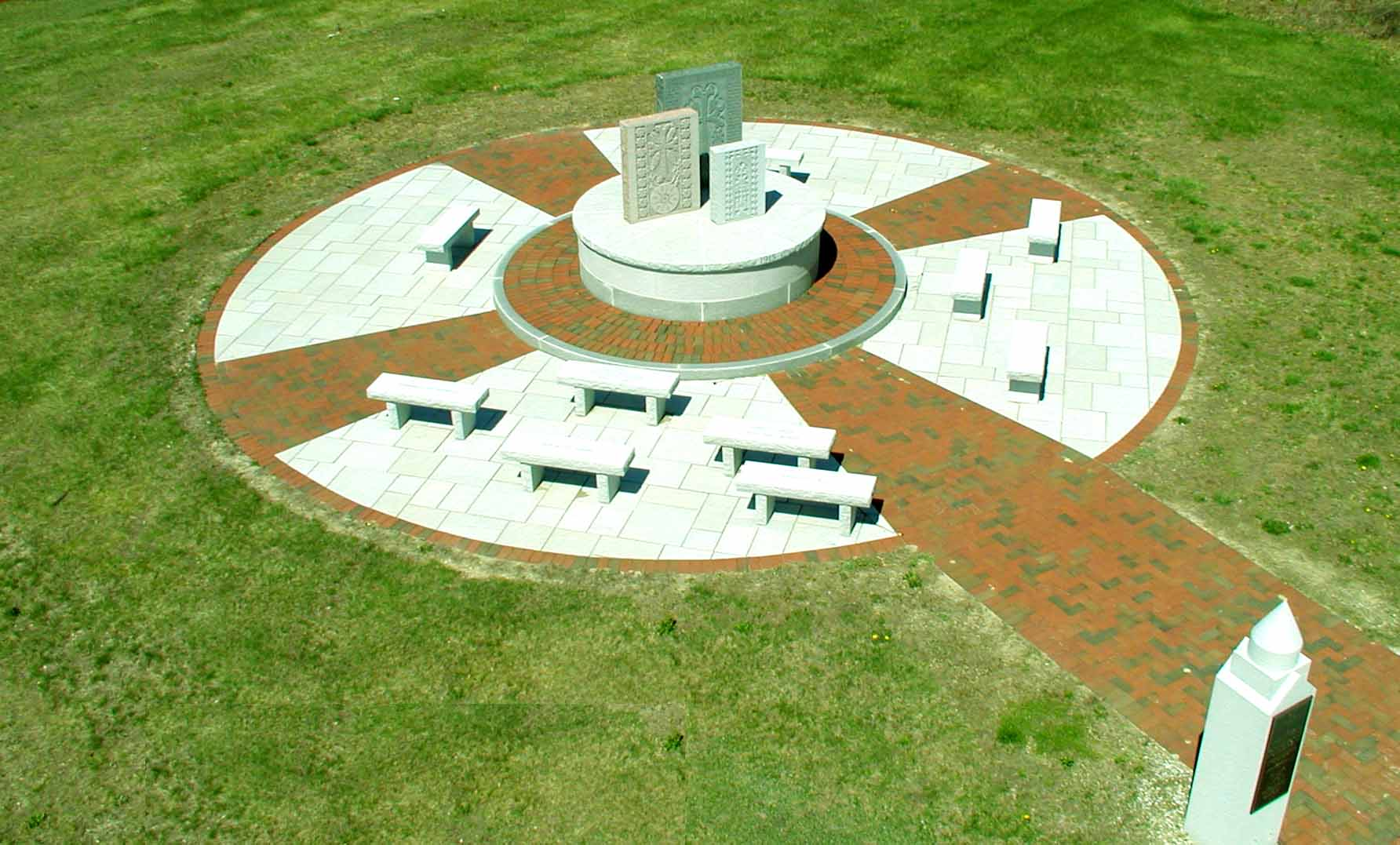
Armenian Martyrs Memorial - above view in Chelmsford, Massachusetts

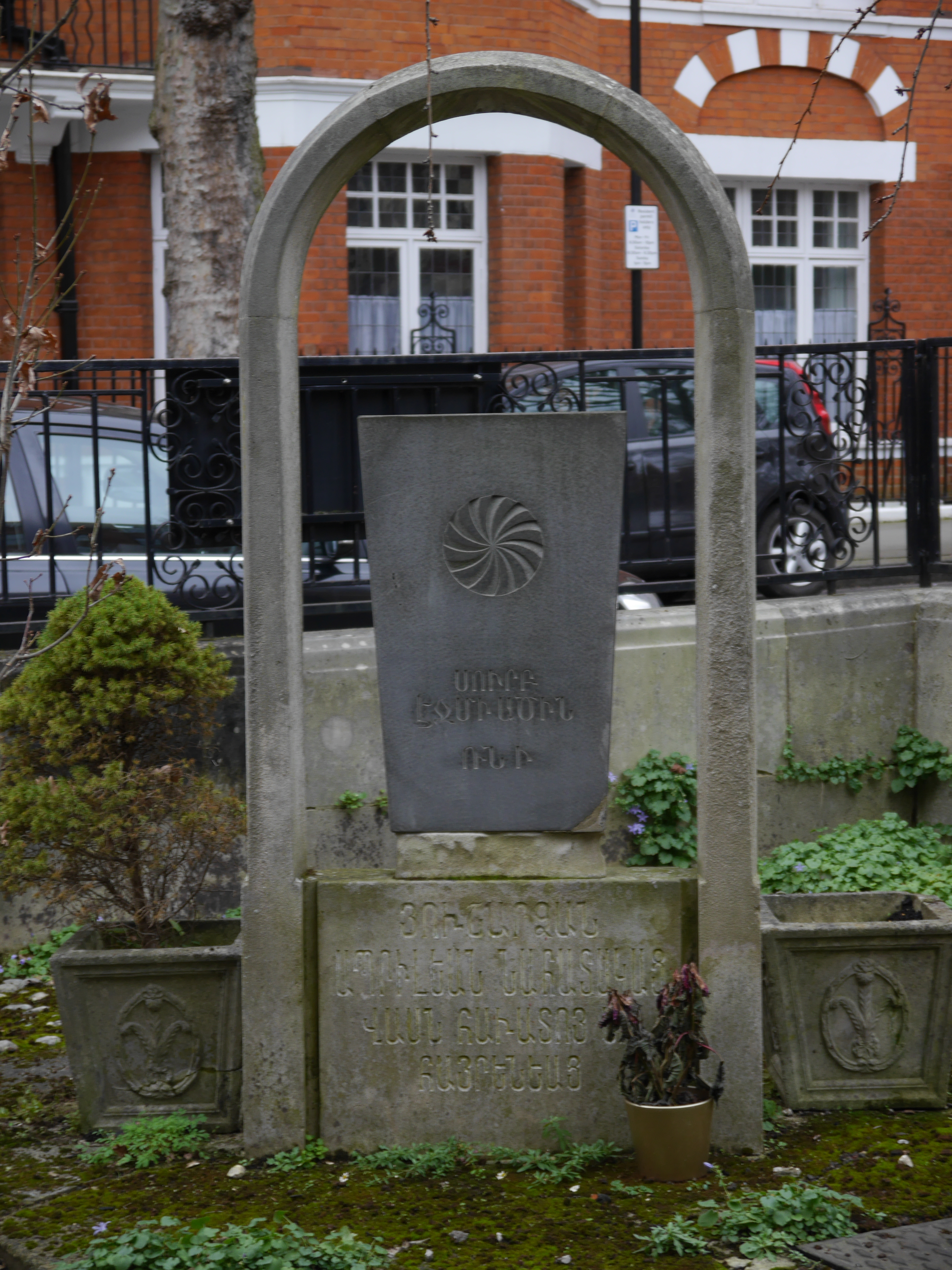
Memorial in the churchyard of St Sarkis, Kensington, the oldest Armenian church in the United Kingdom

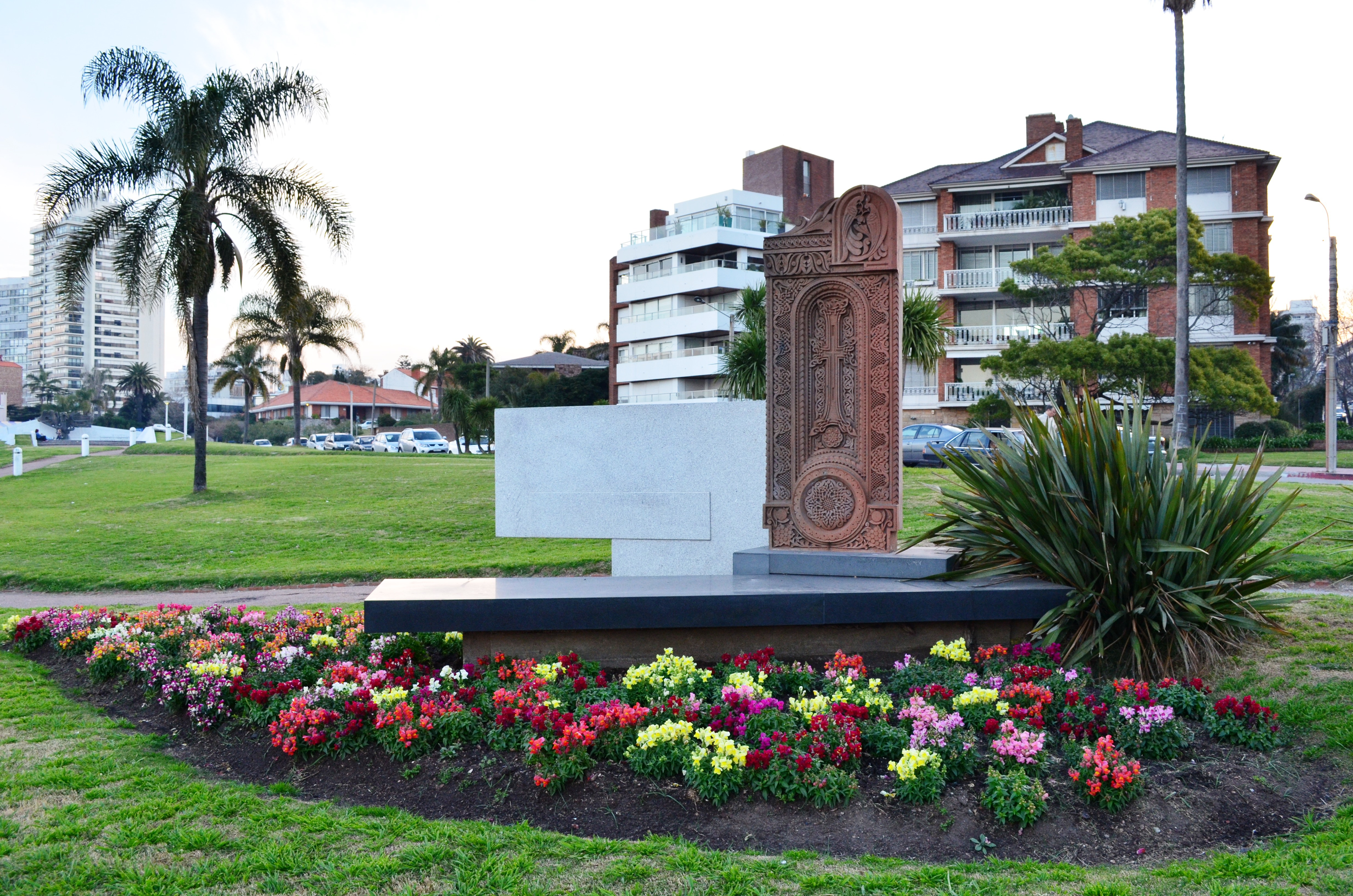
Armenian cross-stone (Khachkar) in Plaza Armenia in Montevideo, Uruguay

== See also ==
- Armenian genocide in culture
