= List of political parties in the Ottoman Empire =

Many political parties were founded in the Ottoman Empire after the Young Turk Revolution. Most did not compete in elections, instead being splinters of previously existing parties. Ethnic and Islamist parties were officially banned after 1909, though Armenian political parties remained legal until 1915. While the Second Constitutional Era basically ended after 1912, new parties were founded during the Armistice Era and up until the end of the Ottoman monarchy.

== Parties ==
=== Second Constitutional Era parties (1908–1912) ===
- Committee of Union and Progress (CUP) – İttihad ve Terakki Cemiyeti/Fırkası (İTC/F). Originally a secret revolutionary (though imperialist) organization founded in 1889 and later a party by 1909, it organized the Young Turk Revolution which began the Second Constitutional Era. The most prominent Young Turk faction before and after the revolution, it espoused centralism and secularism as the way to achieve Ottomanism. Following the revolution, it handedly won the election of 1908, and came under the control of the Activist wing of Mehmed Talat, İsmail Enver, Mehmed Nazım, and Bahaeddin Şakir. After rigging the 1912 election, the committee was forced out of government after a coup d'état that summer, but it took back control of the government after the Raid on the Sublime Porte in 1913. Its leaders negotiated a German alliance, pushing the Ottoman Empire into World War I, during which the committee masterminded genocides targeting the Christian Millets. It was dissolved by its own members in the aftermath of the war in 1918.
- Private Enterprise and Decentralization Association – Teşebbüs-i Şahsi ve Adem-i Merkeziyet Cemiyeti. Led by Mehmed Sabahaddin, it was the primary opposition to the CUP before and immediately after the revolution. It was succeeded by a political party: the Liberty Party. It espoused decentralization to achieve Ottomanism.
- Liberty Party – Osmanlı Ahrar Fırkası. A successor to the Private Enterprise and Decentralization Association, it served as an organized political party for the decentralists to compete in the 1908 general election. Though the party was not successful in the election, it managed to form a large parliamentary group by courting dissatisfied CUP MPs as well as Grand Vizier Kâmil Pasha. It was accused of instigating the 31 March incident and dissolved in 1910.
- Ottoman Democratic Party – Osmanlı Demokrat Fırkası or Fırka-i İbad. It was founded in 1909 by two Old Unionists: Ibrahim Temo and Abdullah Cevdet, and merged with the Freedom and Accord Party in 1911.
- Committee of Altruists for the Nation – Fedakâran-ı Millet Cemiyeti. It was founded in 1908 and closed in 1909.
- Ottoman Committee of Alliance – Heyet-i Müttefika-i Osmaniye. A short lived party that was founded in 1909 or 1910.
- Muhammadan Unity Party – İttihad-ı Muhammedî Fırkası. This was an Islamist party founded by Dervish Vahdeti. It was charged with instigating the 31 March Incident, following which the party was banned and Vahdeti was executed.
- Ottoman Radical Reform Party – İslahat-ı Esasiye-ı Osmaniye Fırkası. Şerif Pasha's party. It was founded in 1909 and merged with the Freedom and Accord Party in 1913.
- Moderate Liberty Party – Mutedil Hürriyetperveran Fırkası. Formed in 1909, many liberals joined the party following the ban on the Liberty Party. It merged with the Freedom and Accord Party in 1911.
- Ottoman Socialist Party – Osmanlı Sosyalist Fırkası (OSF). An Ottomanist socialist party that was founded by Hüseyin Hilmi the Socialist in 1910. It was banned when the CUP repressed all other parties in 1913.
- People's Party – Ahali Fırkası. Formed in 1910 by Gümülcineli İsmail, it merged with the Freedom and Accord Party in 1911.
- Socialist Workers' Federation – Sosyalist İşçi Federasyonu. Both a political party and labour organization with roots in Salonica that was founded in 1909. The Federation claimed that it was not a "nationalist" socialist party, like Dashnaks and Hunchaks, though it held close ties to IMRO. It represented Turkey in the Second International and continued its existence in Greece following Salonica's capture in the First Balkan War.
- New Party – Hizb-i Cedid. A right-wing splinter of the CUP that was briefly the main opposition party, it merged with the Freedom and Accord Party in 1911.
- Progress Party – Hizb-i Terakki. A left-wing splinter of the CUP, it merged with the Freedom and Accord Party in 1911.
- Freedom and Accord Party – Hürriyet ve İtilaf Fırkası (HİF). Formed to contest the 1912 general election, in addition to its decentralist current, most opposition parties merged with it to oppose the CUP. Partisans of the party organized the 1912 coup against the CUP. In the lead up to the 23 January 1913 coup it came under the control of Gümülcineli İsmail and Colonel Sadık Bey, following which the party was suppressed. Following the assassination of Mahmud Shevket Pasha, its leaders were sent into exhile until the Armistice of Mudros, when its leaders were rehabilitated.
- National Constitutional Party – Millî Meşrutiyet Fırkası. It was formed in 1912 as a pan-Turkist party that both the CUP and Freedom and Accord opposed, and was closed a few years later.

The 1913 coup d'état and the aftermath of Mahmud Shevket Pasha's assassination meant the CUP took full control over Ottoman politics, effectively suspending the constitution and suppressing all opposition parties. No political parties were founded between 1912 and 1918.

=== Armistice era and Independence war parties (1918–1922) ===
- Ottoman Liberal People's Party – Osmanlı Hürriyetperver Avam Fırkası. A CUP splinter led by Ali Fethi (Okyar) founded in late October 1918 and supported by Mustafa Kemal Pasha (Atatürk), it was banned on 6 May 1919 for being a continuation of the CUP.
- Renewal Party – Teceddüt Fırkası. This was a continuation of the CUP after it dissolved itself. It briefly held a parliamentary majority but lost power when the Chamber of Deputies was dissolved and was eventually banned by the government by 5 May 1919 for being a continuation of the CUP.
- Freedom and Accord Party – Hürriyet ve İtilaf Fırkası (HİF). With the CUP's liquidation, Freedom and Accord's leaders were rehabilitated. Under its Grand Vizier Damat Ferid Pasha, the party cracked down on the Unionists and the Turkish nationalist movement led by Mustafa Kemal (Atatürk), and advocated a pro-British alignment to get more lenient peace terms from the Allies. The chaotic politics of the Turkish War of Independence served to divide the party until it was again effectively defunct by the end of 1919. It boycotted the 1919 general election.
- People's Economy Party – Ahali İktisat Fırkası. Formed in 1918
- Ottoman Salvation Party – Selamet-i Osmaniye Fırkası. Formed in 1918
- Social Democrat Party – Sosyal Demokrat Fırkası. The party was Marxist and affiliated with the Second International. It participated in the 1919 general election without any success.
- National Liberty Party – Millî Ahrar Fırkası. Formed in 1919
- Turkish Workers and Peasants Socialist Party – Türkiye İşçi ve Çiftçi Sosyalist Fırkası (TİÇSF). This was a Marxist–Leninist party that was a member of the Third International. Most of its leaders were previously students in Germany during the Great War. It was founded in 1919 and supported the Kemalists in Turkey's War of Independence. It would be suppressed upon the declaration of the Republic and dissolved in 1924.
- National Turk Party – Milli Türk Fırkası. A continuation of the National Constitutional Party, it participated in the 1919 general election and Adnan Abdulhak (Adıvar) was elected MP.
- Ottoman Labour Party – Osmanlı Mesai Fırkası. It was founded by former Unionists as a counterweight to the socialist parties.
- Ottoman Farmers Association Party – Osmanlı Çiftçiler Cemiyeti Fırkası. Formed in 1919
- Turkish Socialist Party – Türkiye Sosyalist Fırkası (TSF). Hilmi the Socialist's successor to the Ottoman Socialist Party. This time it was admitted to the Second International, and led the many workers strikes in Istanbul during Allied occupation, though it was opposed to the Kemalists. Hüseyin Hilmi would be arrested in 1922, and the party would be dissolved shortly thereafter.
- National Conservative Party – Milli Muhafazakâr Fırka. Islamist wing which split off from Freedom and Accord after its collapse in 1919, led by Mustafa Sabri.
- Anatolia and Rumeli Defence of National Rights Association – Anadolu ve Rumeli Müdâfaa-i Hukuk Cemiyeti (A–RMHC). This was the unified organization of the many regional anti-partition organizations founded in the wake of the Ottoman Empire's defeat in the Great War. Founded in the Erzurum Congress, it was the political arm of the Turkish nationalist movement and led by Mustafa Kemal Pasha. It won the 1919 and 1920 elections. Following the war of independence, it changed its name to "People's Party" and then "Republican People's Party". Most members of the organization were previous Unionists.
- National Salvation Group – Felâh-ı Vatan. This was the parliamentary group formed by nationalist MPs elected in the 1919 general election.
- Labour Party – Amele Fırkası. Founded in 1920.
- Moderate Freedom and Accord Party – Mûtedil Hürriyet ve İtilaf Fırkası (MHİF). Impotent continuation of Freedom and Accord which excluded Miralay Sadık. Formed in 1920.
- Communist Party of Turkey – Türkiye Komünist Partisi (TKP). Marxist–Leninist party led by Mustafa Suphi. It received support from TİÇSF and Ethem the Circassian. It was admitted to the Third International after being founded in 1920. Suphi and its leaders were massacred in a train car the next year. It continued its existence illegally or otherwise during the Republic until 1988.
- Turkish People's Communist Party – Türkiye Halk İştirakiyun Fırkası (THİF). The political wing of the TKP, led by Salih Hacıoğlu. Founded in 1920, it mostly was active in Anatolia, and was Turkey's first legal communist party. It dissolved itself after Ethem the Circassian's rebellion.
- Turkish Agriculture Party – Türkiye Zürra Fırkası. Founded in 1920.
- Turkish Communist Party – Türkiye Komünist Fırkası (TKF). A faux communist party set up by Mustafa Kemal Pasha (Atatürk) in 1920 to undermine the influence of TKP. Banned after the uprising of Ethem the Circassian.
- Independent Socialist Party – Müstakil Sosyalist Fırkası. Founded in 1922, it was a splinter of TSF, and was represented in the Labour and Socialist International.

=== Ethnic parties ===
- Bulgarian Constitutional Clubs – Съюз на българските конституционни клубове. Political wing of IMRO. Banned with the law against ethnic parties in 1909.
- People's Federative Party (Bulgarian Section) – Народна федеративна партия (българска секция). Left-wing political wing of IMRO, rival of the Bulgarian Constitutional Clubs. Founded in 1909, banned in 1910.
- Armenakan Party – Արմենական Կուսակցութիւն. Founded in 1885, the oldest Armenian political party. Though it did not commit itself to terrorism, it sponsored fedayi. It merged with the Armenian Democratic Liberal Party in 1921.
- Social Democrat Hunchakian Party – Սոցիալ Դեմոկրատ Հնչակյան Կուսակցություն. Revolutionary Marxist Armenian interests party that committed terrorism and sponsored fedayi bands. Founded in 1887. Legalized after 1908, though resumed agitation after 1913. Banned in the lead up to the Tehcir law, its leaders were arrested and executed.
- Armenian Revolutionary Federation – Հայ Յեղափոխական Դաշնակցութիւն. Also known as the Dashnak Party, it was established in 1890 as a revolutionary socialist Armenian interests party with marginally different ideology from the Hunchaks. Committed itself to terrorism, fedayi training, and militancy during the second half of Abdul Hamid II's reign. Attempted to assassinate the Sultan in 1905. Signed a pact with the CUP to overthrow the sultan by all means necessary in 1907. It was also admitted to the Second International that year. Legalized after the revolution. Compared to its Hunchak cousins, the party was more willing to work within the Ottoman system to achieve Armenian liberation. Participated in an electoral alliance with the CUP in the 1912 election. Negotiated with the CUP for a reform package in Ottoman Armenia. Refused to foment rebellions inside Russia in the lead up to World War I. Banned in the lead up to the Tehcir law, its leaders were arrested and executed. Surviving members were integrated into the Russian army and administration of occupied territory in Anatolia. Founding party of the Armenian Democratic Republic.
- Serb Democratic League – Српска демократска лига у Отоманској царевини. Founded in 1908 as the political wing of the Serbian Chetnik Organization. Banned in 1909
- Young Arab Society or Al-Fatat – جمعية العربية الفتاة ه. Formed in the aftermath of the Young Turk Revolution. Underground Arab nationalist organization. Played an important role in the development of the Arab Revolt and the creation of the Kingdom of Syria. Disbanded in 1920 due to the mandate question.
- Ottoman Party for Administrative Decentralization – الحزب العثماني للامركزية الإدارية. Founded in 1913 as an underground Arab interests party advocating decentralization for Arab lands. It was based in Cairo, though most of its members were in Syria. It was targeted by Cemal Pasha.
- Jewish Social Democratic Labour Party in Palestine (Poale Zion) – פועלי ציון. Ottoman Palestine branch of Poale Zion, a Labour Zionist movement which joined the Second International in 1915. The branch was founded in 1906. It was closely aligned with the Hashomer paramilitary.
- Kurdish Society for Cooperation and Progress – Cemiyeta Teawun û Tereqiya Kurd. Kurdish interests organization founded in the wake of the revolution. Banned in 1909.
- Society for the Rise of Kurdistan – Cemîyeta Tealîya Kurdistanê. Founded in 1917 as a secret Kurdish nationalist organization. Led by Abdulkadir Ubeydullah, it demanded autonomy or independence from the Ottoman Empire per Woodrow Wilson's Fourteen Points. However the question of autonomy or independence served to break up the organization, and it was disbanded in 1920. Most of its members participated in the Koçgiri rebellion.
- Society of Kurdish Freedom – Civata Azadiya Kurd. Also known as the Azadî, it was founded in 1921. It fomented the Beytüşşebab and Sheikh Said rebellions. and its members later joined the Xoybûn.
- Circassian Union and Charity Society – Адыгэ Зэготын ыкӀи ЗэдэӀэпыӀэн Хасэ. Founded after the revolution, it was a cultural association for Circassian Ottomans. It was banned by the Republic in 1923.

== See also ==
- List of political parties in Turkey
