= Gümülcineli İsmail =

Turkish politician (1877–1942)

Gümülcineli İsmail Bey
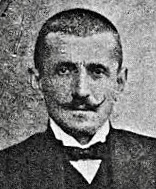

Member of the Chamber of Deputies
- Constituency: Komotini (1908)

Personal details
- Born: 1877 Komotini, Ottoman Empire
- Died: 1942 (aged 64–65)
- Party: Committee of Union and Progress (1908); People's Party (1909); Freedom and Accord Party (1911–1919)

Gümülcineli İsmail Hakkı Bey (1877–1942) was a liberal politician in the late Ottoman Empire, who was a member of the Freedom and Accord Party.

== Biography ==
=== Early years ===
He completed his primary, secondary and five-year Sanjak İdadîsı education in Gümülcine (Komotini). He completed the rest of his İdadîsi education at Edirne Leyli İdadîsi and graduated in 1899. He graduated from Mekteb-i Hukuk in 1904. After graduation, he worked as a lawyer in Komotini and was involved in agriculture. In 1906-1907, he joined the Committee of Union and Progress and worked for the spread of the society in the region. During the Young Turk Revolution, he was the president of the CUP Komotini branch. Since he was twenty-four years old, it was not possible for him to be elected as a deputy in the 1908 elections. For this reason, his age was increased by eight years and he was unanimously elected as a deputy for Komotini.

=== His political life ===
He was a member of the Constitutional Council [Kanun-ı Esasi encümeni] in the Chamber of Deputies; he was the chairman of the Layiha and İstid'â Council. He was also a member of the board of directors and the vice chairman of the CUP. He was also elected as a member of the Extraordinary Council [Encümen-i Fevkalâde] established after the 31 March Incident. He advocated for İsmail Kemal Bey's innocence, asserting that he was not involved in the incident. He also opposed the death sentences given by the Martial Court due to the Adana Massacre. These and similar incidents lead to İsmail Hakkı's disassociation from the CUP. He had now begun to harshly criticize the policies followed by the Union and Progress Society. On 21 February 1910, he resigned as the vice president of the CUP and became president of a new political formation: the People's Party [Ahali Fırkası]. As the party president, he continued his harsh criticisms of the Unionists. He and his party joined the Freedom and Accord Party, which was founded on 21 November 1911.

After the invasion of Tripoli by Italy, he proposed the impeachment of İbrahim Hakkı Pasha, Mahmud Şevket Pasha, and all the CUP-supported cabinets. He was elected president of the Freedom and Accord Party congress of June 7, 1912. He was among the politicians who supported the Saviour Officer intervention, which resulted in the fall of the Union and Progress-supported government of Mehmed Said Pasha. İsmail was arrested following the Bab-ı Ali Raid; however, he was released after giving assurances that he would stay away from politics. When the Mahmud Şevket Pasha government was established, he also took part in the Taklib-i Hükümet attempt to eliminate the government. After the assassination of Mahmud Şevket Pasha, he was sentenced to death in absentia. During World War I, he continued his opposition to the CUP dictatorship by publishing in newspapers such as Al-Ahram in Egypt and Beyanü'l Hak and Mücahade in Thessaloniki. Following the signing of the Armistice of Mudros, he returned to Istanbul on 24 February 1919.

He was appointed as the Governor of Bursa by the Damat Ferit Pasha government. With the conclusion of the Turkish War of Independence, he was included in the list of 150. He died in Paris on August 22, 1945.
