= Mehmed Sadık Bey =

Turkish anti-CUP activist (1860–1941)

Mehmed Sâdık Bey

Personal details
- Born: 1860 Constantinople, Ottoman Empire
- Died: 6 February 1941 (aged 80–81) Istanbul, Turkey
- Party: Freedom and Accord Party (1911–1920) Committee of Union and Progress (1906–1911)

Mehmet Sâdık Bey, also known as Miralay Sâdık, (1860–1941), was a Turkish soldier and politician in the late Ottoman Empire. An original member of the Committee of Union of Progress and Hero of the Revolution, he became disillusioned with the committee and went on to organize various opposition organizations, including the Freedom and Accord Party. Following the Turkish War of Independence he was included in the list of 150 personae non gratae for his stances against the Nationalist Movement.

== Early life ==
He was born in Constantinople, in 1860. His father was the well-known religious scholar Filibeli Abdullah Efendi, a high ranking Islamic teacher. His family was originally from Bursa, but eventually moved to Filibe (Plovdiv).

He graduated from the Military Academy in 1882 as a cavalry lieutenant, serving in Syria, Tripoli and Macedonia.

In 1906, while he was a Miralay (colonel) and a cavalry regiment officer in Monastir, he joined the Committee of Union and Progress upon the recommendation of Kâzım Karabekir. Sâdık ran a secret Unionist newspaper called Neyyir-i Hakikat, recruited many officers into the committee, and became head of the organization's Monastir branch. He participated in the Young Turk Revolution, having an essential role in the assassination of Shemsi Pasha, and sent telegrams to the capital from Monastir demanding the reinstatement of the constitution.

== Tension with the CUP ==
Upon the declaration of the Second Constitutional Era, he participated in the CUP Congress held in Salonica as a Monastir delegate, which quickly lead to a falling-out. He was identified as problematic for the committee and sent to Istanbul after the congress to take charge of a cavalry unit, but the assignment was countermanded on the way, and instead he was appointed governor of Debar to take care of unrest in Albania. Sâdık sent an appeal to the Interior Ministry to be dismissed, whereupon he returned to Istanbul in April 1909.

In the 1909 CUP Congress, Sâdık Bey accused Talât, Cavid, and Hüseyin Cahid of being freemasons, and requested their expulsion from the committee. This demand was not put to discussion, and he was instead assigned to maintain relations between the CUP and the government, together with Ömer Naci Bey and Nafiz Bey. Despite his disagreements with prominent figures in the CUP, the Unionist leadership understood the weight he had within the army and kept him in. Talât described the agenda of meetings he had with Sâdık as "always the same fairy tales and nonsense: Freemasonry, Zionism, personalities." Sâdık had built quite the clique of loyal officers, his words carrying such weight that Cavid had to resign from the Finance Ministry.

=== The New Party ===
As tension increased between himself and leading members of the CUP he started a right-wing internal opposition movement called the New Party (Turkish: Hizb-i Cedit), together with Balıkesir Deputy Abdülaziz Mecdi Efendi in 1911. 110 out of 160 Union and Progress deputies supported the faction, and were opposed to the left-wing faction: the Progress Party (Turkish: Hizb-i Terraki). Sâdık met with Talât, and stipulated that at minimum, the CUP had to withdraw from the government and the parliament. The New Party presented its views to the CUP in a ten-point program on April 23, 1911:

1. Deputies should not seek privileges and special interests
2. Deputies should be separated from civil servants
3. Deputies should become ministers by secret ballot and by obtaining a 2/3's majority in parliament
4. Laws should be obeyed and attention should be paid to the responsibilities of ministers
5. Efforts should be made to unite ethnic elements in the Ottoman country, and trade, agriculture, industry and education should be advanced in proportion to need
6. Religious and national morality and traditions should be protected, but they should be developed by taking the good aspects of Western civilization
7. Ottoman traditions should be maintained and kept in accordance with the Constitution
8. The appointment and dismissal of civil servants should be given a serious status
9. In order to strengthen the rights of the sultan, changes should be made in the relations between the legislative, executive and judicial powers in the Constitution
10. The actions of associations established for secret and special purposes should be prohibited

The crisis was resolved with a compromise when some demands of the New Party were accepted at the 1911 CUP congress. This included the resignation of Talât and other CUP hardliners from the government. Hüseyin Cahit in his memoirs described the influence of Sâdık and his New Party faction: “If the faction issue prepared by Colonel Sâdık Bey and his friends had succeeded as desired, Union and Progress would then have disintegrated and been destroyed.”

Sâdık was sent away to Salonica by the Minister of War Mahmut Şevket Pasha on 1 May 1911. There he published a manifesto attacking the CUP and the military. In his declaration, he urged the military to withdraw from politics and that the CUP should either remain as a guardian of the constitutional monarchy (nigâhbân-ı meşrutiyet) or become a full-fledged political party. Following this declaration, he was retired from the military with the rank of colonel, on the grounds that he was “not fit for military service.”

== Opposition to the CUP ==
When Sâdık returned to Istanbul he was among the founders of the Freedom and Accord Party (founded on 21 November 1911), which quickly absorbed most of the previously existing opposition parties. He was invited to join the party by a group of liberal politicians which became known as the Münevvers Group: Lütfi Fikri, Rıza Nur, Rıza Tevfik and Ahmed Reşid, as they recognized the need to have support in the army.

On 24 November 1911, Damat Ferid Pasha was elected as the party president and Sâdık Bey as the party vice president. However shortly after the party's establishment, Sâdık started having disagreements with the Münevvers Group over the decisions he made without consulting the party's organs. Even before the 1912 general election, it was expected that he and his supporters would defect and found a new party called Ottoman Union (İttihâd-ı Osmanî). Following the CUP's victory in the 1912 election, which went down in history as the "election of clubs" he spearheaded the 1912 Ottoman coup d'état by organizing a clique of pro-Freedom and Accord officers in the military, known as the Savior Officers, demanding the resignation of the CUP-government. When Sâdık and the Savior Officers targeted the CUP-dominated Chamber of Deputies demanding its dissolution, they soon got what they wanted. He authored the memorandum sent to Halil Menteşe, the Unionist president of the Chamber.

During the First Balkan War, Sâdık and other Accordists met with Grand Vizier Kâmil Pasha, following which on 1 January he closed Freedom and Accord Party chapters without consulting the party organs. The Münevvers Group separated from Freedom and Accord after this incident, and the party was completely taken over by Sâdık and his supporters. It is rumored that Sâdık and Gümülcineli İsmail were planning their own coup d'état against Kâmil's unpopular government on 25 January 1913, but the CUP beat them with their own coup on 23 January.

After the CUP came back in power following the Raid on the Sublime Porte on 23 January 1913, Sâdık first fled to Athens and then to Paris when he learned that there was an arrest warrant for him. In Paris, in July 1913, it was announced that Şerif Pasha’s Ottoman Reform Party and the Freedom and Accord Party had merged, and Sâdık became the party’s second leader. He quickly fell out with Şerif Pasha, and from Paris fled to Egypt, where he lived in Heliopolis, nearby Cairo, and stayed there between 1913 and 1919. While in Egypt, he was put on trial by the Martial Law Court (Divan-ı Harb-i Örfi) for his alleged role in the assassination of Mahmud Şevket Pasha and was sentenced to death in absentia.

== Activities during the Turkish War of Independence ==
Over the course of World War I he maintained close relations with the British. Following the Armistice of Mudros and the liquidation of the CUP he requested Damat Ferid Pasha -his old ally from the Freedom and Accord Party- to allow for his return to Turkey; abroad he was experiencing serious financial difficulties and debts. He returned to Istanbul on 8 May 1919. The Freedom and Accord Party was initially re-established in early 1919 under the leadership of Müşir Nuri Pasha, but as soon as Sâdık returned to Istanbul he usurped the party leadership with the confidence he received from party branches without holding a party congress. Ferid chose not to rejoin his party, but received its political support. After the occupation of Izmir, Sâdık participated in the Sultanic Council as the president of the Freedom and Accord Party. He advocated for Turkey to become a British Mandate. According to a telegram by Mustafa Kemal Pasha, he was the only delegate to do so. Sâdık also denounced Ferid Pasha's government in a speech, stating that the government initially acted within the framework of the Freedom and Accord Party program, but since deviated from it.

Immediately after Ferid went to the Paris Peace Conference to represent Turkey, while Şeyhülislam Mustafa Sabri Efendi was acting Grand Vizier, Sâdık was appointed to the Council of Ministers on 14 June 1919 and was meant to be appointed to the Senate, a move meant to mend the divide between Ferid and Sâdık. However, the Freedom and Accord Party continued its objections to the government, and he was not appointed to the Senate. Thereupon, Sâdık resigned from the Council of Ministers four days later. Sâdık stated that he was dissatisfied with the government's failure to carry out purges of Unionists among the civil service. Meanwhile Damat Ferid Pasha, who was still in Paris, accused Sâdık of being a sympathizer of France which strained ties between the government and the Freedom and Accord Party. On 25 June Sâdık Bey announced that his party was pulling support from Ferid Pasha's government and urged his supporters in the cabinet to resign from the cabinet or be expelled from his party. This ultimatum resulted in the disintegration of the party. At the end of May 1920, after Sâdık announced a new Central Committee without holding a congress, party dissidents founded the Moderate Freedom and Accord Party, with Mustafa Sabri Efendi as its president. Ferid and Sultan Mehmed VI supported this new party.

Sâdık also seized the administration of the Friends of England Association, originally founded by Said Molla, with a congress coup in 1921, but lost control of the organization to Said Molla after a counter-congress coup. He was in conflict with both the Ferid government in Istanbul and Kemal government in Ankara. The Ankara Government sentenced him to death in absentia for treason on 3 July. After Ankara forces under the command of Refet Pasha entered Istanbul, he took refuge in the British Embassy with other Allied collaborators for a couple of days and then escaped to Romania on 8 November 1922 on a British ship. After the Treaty of Lausanne, he was included in the list of 150 personae non gratae issued by the Grand National Assembly in 1924. The Grand National Assembly voted to strip him of his Turkish citizenship in 1927.

== Exile ==
Sâdık lived in Romania for 19 years between 1922 and 1941. He lived in Constanța until 1926, and in the Hârșova village of Dobruja after 1926, where he was under financial stress. His son Muhittin, who worked as a driver and then as a whitewasher, supported him. When news emerged of an amnesty to be announced in 1933 would include the 150s, letters of him expressing remorse were published by the Vahdet newspaper in Syria. However, Sâdık Bey denied writing these letters. The 150s were not included in the amnesty issued in 1933. The 150s were finally offered amnesty with the law issued on 29 June 1938. However, Sâdık Bey refused to return to Turkey. His daughter Leman stated in an interview with the Vatan newspaper that her father still did not want to return because he was waiting for his innocence to be recognized.

In 1940, Sâdık got in touch with President İsmet İnönü through his nephew Alaattin Gövsa, who was a member of parliament. Sâdık stated that he did not want to return to his homeland as a pardoned criminal and asked him to help erase the stain of treason from his forehead before he died. İnönü relented, and allowed him to return.

Sâdık became excited but ill when the Romanian steamer Büyükdere arrived to take him back to Turkey. He landed in Istanbul at 12:30 on Tuesday, 4 February 1941, and was welcomed by his nephews Alaattin and Salahattin Gövsa and taken to their home in Kadıköy. However as his condition worsened he was taken to Numune Hospital at 15:00 and died at 21:30 of heart failure, the same night of his return to his home city, likely of a heart attack.

== Personal life ==
Sâdık died at the age of 81, and was buried in the Karacaahmet Cemetery. He was married, and had two daughters and a son. His wife and one daughter died while in Dobruja. He spoke Arabic and French, painted, and was interested in Sufism; he was a member of the Halveti Order. Although his daughter Leman stated that she wrote his memoirs, they have not been found yet.
