= 150 personae non gratae of Turkey =

1924 list of banished Ottoman royalty and elite

The 150 personae non gratae of Turkey (Turkish: Yüzellilikler, lit. 'Hundred-and-fiftyers') is a list of high-ranking personages of the Ottoman Empire who were exiled from the Republic of Turkey shortly after the end of the Turkish War of Independence with the Armistice of Mudanya on 11 October 1922. The Sultanate was abolished by the Grand National Assembly of Turkey in Angora (Ankara) on 1 November 1922, and the last Ottoman Sultan, Mehmed VI, was declared persona non grata. Leaving Istanbul aboard the British warship HMS Malaya on 17 November 1922, he was sent into exile and died in Sanremo, Italy, on 16 May 1926.

The list was created on 23 April 1924, by the Grand National Assembly of Turkey, and revised on 1 June 1924. It included individuals that had collaborated with the occupying forces and opposed the Turkish War of Independence. In addition, it targeted the former Imperial ruling-elite, it reaffirmed the political and cultural break between the Empire and the Republic. The preliminary list contained 600 individuals, negotiated down to its final form of 150 with the Treaty of Lausanne.

== List ==
House of Osman and the Imperial Court
No.	Name	Description
1	Kiraz Hamdi	Aide-de-camp of the Sultan
2	Zeki Bey	General Hademe-i Hassa
3	Kayserili Şaban Ağa	Hazine-i Hassa Müfettişi (Ottoman Central Depot inspector)
4	Şükrü Tütüncübaşı	
5	Şerkarin Yaver	
6	Miralay Tahir	
7	Seryaver Avni	Naval minister
8	Refik Bey	former Hazine-i Hassa Müdürü and Defter-i Hakani Emini

Imperial Government
No.	Name	Description
9	Ürgüplü Mustafa Sabri Efendi	former Sheikh ul-Islam
10	Ali Rüşdi	Minister of Justice
11	Cemal Artin	Minister of Trade and Agriculture
12	Cakacı Hamdi Pasha	former Minister of the Navy
13	Rumbeyoğlu Fahrettin	former Minister of Education and Minister of Justice
14	Kızılhançerli Remzi	former Minister of Trade and Agriculture
15	Hâdî Pasha	General & signer of Treaty of Sèvres
16	Rıza Tevfik Bölükbaşı	former President of Council of State & signer of Treaty of Sèvres
17	Reşat Halis	former Ottoman Ambassador to Switzerland & signer of Treaty of Sèvres

Kuva-i İnzibatiye
No.	Name	Description
18	Süleyman Şefik Pasha	Kuva-i İnzibatiye Commander In Chief
19	Bulgar Tahsin	Cavalry Captain (adjutant of Şefik Pasha)
20	Ahmet Refik	Colonel in Kuva-i İnzibatiye, Chief of the general staff
21	Tarık Mümtaz	Commander of Kuva-i İnzibatiye Mitralyöz and adjutant of Damat Ferit Pasha
22	Ali Nadir Pasha	Kuva-i İnzibatiye, Commander of İzmir Army Corps
23	Kaymakam Fettah	Kuva-i İnzibatiye & member of the Ottoman Special Military Tribunal
24	Çopur Hakkı	Kuva-i İnzibatiye member

Governors (vali) of the provinces of the Ottoman Empire (vilayet)
No.	Name	Description
25	Gümülcineli İsmail	former governor of Bursa
26	Konyalı Muhammed Zeynelabidin	
27	Fanizade Mes'ud	former Cebelibereket (Osmaniye) mutasarrıf
28	Miralay Sadık	Freedom and Accord Party leader
20	Bedirhani Halil Râmi	former Malatya mutasarrıf
30	Giritli Hüsnü	former mutasarrıf of Manisa
31	Nemrud Mustafa	former Judge of the Ottoman Special Military Tribunal
32	Hulusi	former Mayor of Uşak
33	Hain Mustafa	former District-Governor of Adapazarı
34	Hafız Ahmet	former mufti of Tekirdağ
35	Sâbit	former mutasarrıf of Afyonkarahisar
36	Celâl Kadri	former mutasarrıf of Gaziantep
37	Adanalı Zeynelabidin	Freedom and Accord Party Secretary General
38	Vasfi Hoca	former Minister of Evkaf
39	Damat Ali Galip	former Governor of Harput
40	Ömer Fevzi	Mufti of Bursa
41	Aziz Nuri	former assistant Governor of Bursa
42	Ahmet Asım	İzmir Kadı Müşaviri
43	Nâtık	former Istanbul Muhafızı
44	Âdil Bey	former Minister of the Interior
45	Mehmet Ali Bey	former Minister of the Interior
46	Salim Mirimiran	former Governor and Deputy Mayor of Edirne
47	Hoca Raish-zâde İbrahim	Mutasarrıf for the Greeks in Kütahya
48	Abdurrahman	Governor of Adana during the Franco-Turkish War
49	Ömer Fevzi	member of parliament from Şarkikarahisar
50	Adil	Mülazım, known as "torturer"
51	Refik	Mülazım, known as "torturer"
52	Şerif	former Kırkağaç kaymakam
53	Mahmut Mahir	former Çanakkale mutasarrıf
54	Emin	former Commander of Central İstanbul
55	Sadullah Sami	former Kilis kaymakam
56	Osman Nuri	former mutasarrıf of Bolu and former Barrister at the Interior Ministry

Çerkes Ethem and accomplices
No.	Name	Description
57	Çerkes Ethem	
58	Reşit	brother of Çerkes Ethem
59	Tevfik	brother of Çerkes Ethem
60	Eşref Kuşçubaşı	Special Organization leader
61	Hacı Sami	brother of Eşref Kuşçubaşı
62	İzmirli Küçük Ethem	captainformer Akhisar Kaymakamı
63	Düzceli Mehmet oğlu Sami	
64	Burhaniyeli Halil İbrahim	
65	Demirkapılı Hacı Ahmet	from Susurluk

Participant envoys to the Circassian Congress
No.	Name	Description
66	Bağ Osman	from Sümbüllü village, Hendek
67	İbrahim Hakkı	former İzmit mutasarrıf
68	Sait Beraev	
69	Tahir Berzek	
70	Maan Şirin	from Harmantepe village, Adapazarı
71	Hüseyin Kocaömeroğlu	from Teke village, Söke Ereğlisi
72	Bağ Kamil	from Talustanbey village, Adapazarı
73	Hamete Ahmet	
74	Maan Ali	
75	Harun Reşit	from Karaosman village, Kirmastı
76	Eskişehirli Hızır Hoca	
77	İsa	son of Bigalı Nuri Bey
78	Kazım	from Şahinbey village, Adapazarı
79	Lampaz Yakup	from Tuzakçı village, Gönen
80	Kumpat Hafız Sait	from Bayramiç village, Gönen
81	former major Ahmet	from Keçeler village, Gönen
82	Sait	Barrister from İzmir
83	Şamlı Ahmet Nuri	

Police officers
No.	Name	Description
84	Tahsin	former Director of Istanbul Police
85	Kemal	former assistant director of Istanbul Police
86	Ispartalı Kemal	assistant director of Public Safety
87	Hafız Sait	former Chief Officer of Istanbul Police Department First Section
88	Şeref	former First Branch Manager of Istanbul Police Department
89	Hacı Kemal	former Arnavutköy Central Officer
90	Namık	Polis Başmemurlarından
91	Nedim	Commisar of Şişli
92	Fuat	former İzmit Central Officer, Director of Edirne Police and Yalova Kaymakam
93	Yolgeçenli Yusuf	police officer in Adana
94	Sakallı Cemil	former Unkapanı Central Officer
95	Mazlum	former Büyükdere Central Officer
96	Fuat	former Beyoğlu Second Commissar

Journalists
No.	Name	Description
97	Mevlanzade Rifat Bey	owner of Serbestî and member of Freedom and Accord Party
98	Sait Molla	owner of Istanbul Gazetesi, printed in Turkish
99	İzmirli Hafız İsmail	owner and former editor of Müsavat Gazetesi & member of Darülhikmet
100	Refik Halit Karay	owner of Aydede & former Director General of the Post and Telegraph Ministry
101	Bahriyeli Ali Sami	owner of Bandırma Adalet Gazetesi
102	Neyir Mustafa	owner of Hakikat Gazetesi in Thessaloniki Teemin and Elyevm in Edirne
103	Ferit	former editor of Köylü Gazetesi
104	Refi Cevat Ulunay	owner of Alemdar Gazetesi
105	Pehlivan Kadri	of Alemdar Gazetesi
106	Fânî-zâde Ali İlmi	owner of Ferda Gazetesi in Adana
107	Trabzonlu Ömer Fevzi	one of the owners of Balıkesir İrşad Gazetesi
108	Hasan Sadık	owner of Halep Doğru Yol Gazetesi
109	İzmirli Refet	owner and director of Köylü Gazetesi

Others
No.	Name	Description
110	Tarsuslu Kamilpaşazade Selami	
111	Tarsuslu Kamilpaşazade Kemal	
112	Süleymaniyeli Kürt Hakkı	
113	İbrahim Sabri	son of Şeyhülislam Mustafa Sabri
114	Bursalı Cemil	factory owner
115	Çerkes Ragıp	well-known English spy
116	Haçinli Kazak Hasan	officer during French invasion
117	Süngülü Davut	bandit leader
118	Çerkes Bekir	Binbaşı
119	Necip	brother-in-law of factory owner Bursalı Cemil
120	Ahmet Hulusi	former Inspector of Islamic Affairs of İzmir
121	Uşaklı Madanoğlu Mustafa	
122	Remzi son of Yusuf	from Tuzakçı village, Gönen
123	Zühtü son of Hacı Kasım	from Bayramiç village, Gönen
124	Şakir son of Kocagözün Osman	from Balcı village, Gönen
125	Koç Ali son of Koç Mehmet	from Muratlar village, Gönen
126	Aziz son of Mehmet	from Ayvacık village, Gönen
127	Osman son of Bağcılı Ahmet	from Keçeler village, Gönen
128	İzzet son of Molla Süleyman	from Yıldız village, Susurluk
129	Kâzım son of Hüseyin	from Muratlar village, Gönen
130	Arap Mahmut son of Bekir	from Balcı village, Gönen
131	Gardiyan Yusuf	from Rüstem village, Gönen
132	Eyüp son of Ömer	from Balcı village, Gönen
133	İbrahim Çavuş son of Talustan	from Keçeler village, Gönen
134	İbrahim son of Topallı Şerif	Balcı village, Gönen
135	İdris son of Topal Ömer	from Keçeler village, Gönen
136	Kurhoğlu İsmail	from Bolcaağaç village, Manyas
137	İshak son of Muhtar Hacı	from Keçeler village, Gönen
138	İshak son of Yusuf	from Kayapınar village, Marmara
139	Sabit son of Ali Bey	from Kızlık village, Manyas
140	Selim son of Veli	from Balcı village, Gönen
141	Osman son of Makinacı Mehmet	from Çerkes Mahallesi, Gönen
142	Kâmil son of Kadir	from Değirmenboğazı village, Manyas
143	Galip son of Hüseyin	from Keçidere village, Gönen
144	Salih son of Çerkes Sait	from Hacıyakup village, Manyas
145	İsmail brother of Maktul Şevket	from Hacıyakup village, Manyas
146	Deli Kasım son of Abdullah	from Keçeler village, Gönen
147	Kemal son of Hasan Onbaşı	from Çerkes Mahallesi, Gönen
148	Kâzım Efe	brother of Kâmil son of Kadir from Değirmenboğazı village, Manyas
149	Pallaçoğlu Kemal	from Kızlık village, Gönen
150	Tuğoğlu Mehmet	from Keçeler village, Gönen
