= Mehmed Sadık =

Mehmed Sadık may refer to:

- Mehmed Sadık Pasha (1826–1901), Ottoman statesman and Grand Vizier
- Mehmed "Miralay" Sadık (1860–1941), Ottoman soldier and politician
- Michał Czajkowski or Mehmed Sâdık Pasha (1804 –1886), Ottoman–Polish émigré and soldier
