= Saviour Officers =

Armed organisation in the Ottoman Empire

Saviour Officers or Halâskâr Zâbitân (Turkish: Kurtarıcı Subaylar) or Halâskâran (Turkish: Kurtarıcılar) was a pro-Freedom and Accord Party armed organisation that was organised in May 1912. The organisation, which was an opponent of the Committee of Union and Progress, carried out many actions from the day it was founded until the date of the Raid on the Sublime Porte.

Saviour Officers, who published harsh statements in newspapers and submitted memoranda to the Military Council, caused the Grand Vizier Mehmed Said Pasha to resign. They sent a threatening letter to Halil Bey, the President of the Chamber of Deputies, asking for the dissolution of the parliament with the majority of Union and Progress, and although these requests were condemned by the parliament, the parliament was dissolved after the initiatives of Ahmet Muhtar Pasha.
