= 1912 Ottoman coup d'état =

1912 Ottoman coup d'etat
Date	June–July 1912
Location	Constantinople, Ottoman Empire
Result	Coup successful; Committee of Union and Progress overthrown.; Dissolution of the Chamber of Deputies; Ahmed Muhtar Pasha forms a national unity government.

Belligerents
Saviour Officers	(Ottoman Empire) Ottoman Government; Committee of Union and Progress

Commanders and leaders
Mehmed Sadık	Mehmed Said Pasha; Mehmed Talaat

The 1912 Ottoman coup d'état (17 July 1912) was a coup by military memorandum in the Ottoman Empire against the Committee of Union and Progress by a group of military officers calling themselves the Saviour Officers (Ottoman Turkish: Halâskâr Zâbitân) during the dissolution of the Ottoman Empire. The coup occurred in the context of increasing distrust in the CUP's political agenda, the fallout of the Italo-Turkish War, and rising political polarization.

In late 1911, anti-CUP opposition consolidated into the Freedom and Accord Party, and both sides sought to abuse the constitution for their own gain. After the CUP's election victory in the 1912 election, widely deemed fraudulent, Freedom and Accord members recruited army officers serving in Albania to their cause in protest. They organized themselves into the Saviour Officers, which are often referred to as the military wing of the Freedom and Accord Party. By the summer of 1912, the pro-CUP Grand Vizier Said Pasha resigned under Savior Officer pressure, completing the coup.

Said Pasha turned over the premiership to Ahmed Muhtar Pasha's non-partisan Great Cabinet. With his resignation due to the First Balkan War, Kâmil Pasha's anti-CUP ministry came to power, until the CUP violently returned to power on 23 January 1913, with the Raid on the Sublime Porte.

The coup was one of the central events of the politically volatile 1912–13 years, which saw political instability due to the power struggle between the CUP and Freedom and Accord, as well as the newly sparked Balkan Wars.

== Background ==
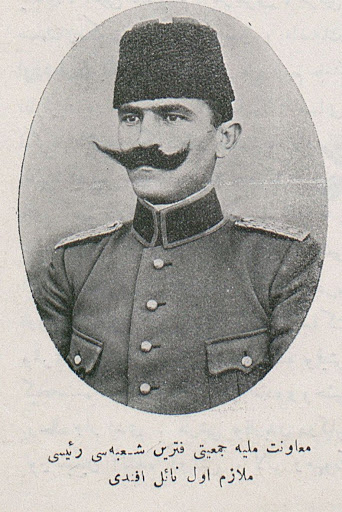
Evvel Nail Efendi, member of the Saviour Officers and organizer of the coup

The Committee of Union and Progress (CUP) was a revolutionary group that instigated the Young Turk Revolution and the Second Constitutional Era. The revolution resulted in the Sultan Abdul Hamid II announcing the restoration of the Ottoman Constitution on 24 July 1908 and an election to elect a new parliament. The 1908 election put the CUP firmly in the legislature, while the main opposition was the Liberty Party. The 31 March Incident (13 April 1909) was an attempt to dismantle the Second Constitutional Monarchy and to restore the Sultan-Caliph Abdul Hamid II his powers. The countercoup was put down by a constitutionalist force which marched on the capital: the Action Army (Hareket Ordusu), and Abdul Hamid II was deposed for his half-brother Mehmed V. While the CUP was back in power and purged reactionaries from government, it was not fully in control, and elements in the country became alarmed at the manner in which the CUP was becoming increasingly authoritarian. In government with the CUP was the War Minister Mahmud Shevket Pasha, a confederate with the CUP during the 31 March Incident by organizing the Action Army, but now skeptical of the party's intentions.

== Lead up ==
=== Discord in the CUP ===
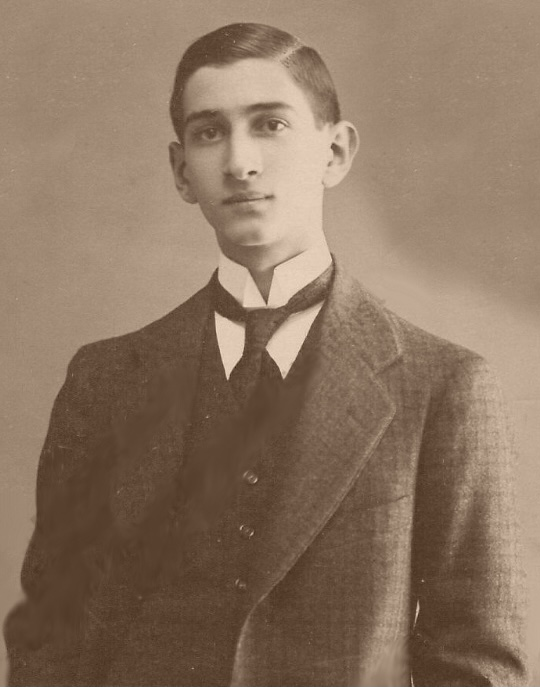
Selahaddin Bey, son of Liberal Union leader Kâmil Pasha and a member of the Saviour Officers

A group of officers led by CUP member and hero of the revolution Mehmed Sadık would separate from the CUP, after accusing central committee members Mehmed Talat, Mehmed Cavid, and Hüseyin Cahid of being seduced by Zionism and Freemasonry. Cavid would subsequently resign his post as minister of finance.

=== Discord in government ===
On 30 September 1911, Unionist İbrahim Hakkı Pasha resigned as Grand Vizier following the outbreak of the Italo-Turkish War. When Tripolitanian MPs proposed to put him on trial for failing to stop Italian occupation of the area, the CUP blocked the motion, increasing partisanship. A meeting in October by all of the parliament's major politicians: Krikor Zohrab, Cavid, Talat, Halil Menteşe, Hakkı, Vartkes Serengülian, and Karekin Pastermadjian was held, the agenda being the CUP's lack of commitment to constitutional government, and a potential way to resolve differences between the CUP and opposition. The CUP rejected the proposals from Zohrab, increasing polarization.

In November 1911, the opposition consolidated into the Freedom and Accord Party, with Sadık as the party's vice president and Damat Ferid Pasha as president. An early victory for the party occurred in the late 1911 Constantinople by-election, in which the Freedom and Accord candidate won against the CUP's candidate. The Unionists immediately called for Mehmed V to dissolve parliament and call an election, with the hope that they could stop the momentum of the new opposition party, but constitutional amendments passed after the 31 March Incident meant the Chamber of Deputies, now dominated by Freedom and Accord, held that prerogative, no longer the Sultan.

Seeing parliament getting out of control, the CUP pressured Grand Vizier Said Pasha to get parliamentary approval for a constitutional amendment which would return to the Sultan the power to dissolve parliament, but when Freedom and Accord blocked this proposal, he resigned. Though the Freedom and Accord Party was ascendant in the chamber, it did not yet have an empire wide political apparatus and was averse to an election which would inevitably come with a dissolved parliament. Mehmed V reappointed Said Grand Vizier with a cabinet which included more Unionists, despite disapproval from Freedom and Accord and the President of the Senate: Ahmed Muhtar Pasha. Said Pasha again introduced a constitutional amendment to the Chamber that would give the Sultan prerogative to dissolve parliament, and it was again blocked by Freedom and Accord. On 18 January, 1912 Article 7 of the constitution was employed; the Senate voted to dissolve the Chamber of Deputies and Mehmed V obliged.

In April 1912, elections were held for a new session of parliament. However the CUP employed electoral fraud and violence at a massive scale, winning all but 6 seats in the Chamber of Deputies, to the point that it was known as the "election of clubs". The election results immediately caused an uproar against the CUP. Moreover, because of the war in Libya and the start of Albanian revolt, CUP lost its former support and prestige. This time, Freedom and Accord was pushing for the Chamber's dissolution so it could win in a new election.

== Coup ==
By June, Colonel Sadık and staff major Gelibolulu Kemal (later surnamed Şenkil) would form the Saviour Officers (Halâskâr Zâbitân) clique, and requested President of the Ottoman Assembly Halil Bey to disband the CUP dominated parliament.

During this time, the units sent to Albania to put down the revolt joined the rebels and took to the hills, much like the Unionists themselves did in 1908. These officers being affiliated with the Saviour Officers, they delivered an ultimatum that the new parliament should be dissolved and an impartial government under Kâmil Pasha be promulgated. Shevket immediately resigned from his ministry in support of the Saviour Officers, leaving the CUP isolated, and starting a wave of resignations from Said Pasha's cabinet. On 16 June 1912 the Unionist dominated parliament voted Said Pasha their confidence, which failed to appease the rebels. When the officers published a manifesto in the press and a message to the sultan, and ostensibly prepared to march on the capital, Said Pasha's finally resigned.

On July 19, Mehmed V announced to the army that a new impartial and technocratic government would be formed and that he would facilitate negotiations for the selection of premier. Gazi Ahmed Muhtar Pasha, a war hero, was finally selected, with the hope that his appointment would stop the ever increasing politicization of the army. Muhtar Pasha's government, known as the "Great Cabinet", included several prestigious statesmen, and they easily received a vote of confidence. The CUP though, notwithstanding its majority in the parliament, lost its executive power.

Although Ahmed Muhtar Pasha and his cabinet were non-partisan, the Saviour Officers next pressured Ahmed Muhtar Pasha's government to dissolve parliament -which was accomplished through the passage of several constitutional amendments- costing the CUP its last stronghold, on August 4. Mehmed V subsequently enacted their vote. Martial law enacted following the 31 March Incident, was thus lifted, until returning with the start of the First Balkan War.

== Aftermath ==
With the Chamber of Deputies dissolved, a new general election was called. This time, the CUP was restricted by the government. Some Unionist leaders thought of boycotting the election, but Talat convinced the Central Committee to participate. On October 8, Montenegro declared war on the Ottoman Empire, beginning the Balkan Wars, and these elections were ultimately shelved. Muhtar Pasha resigned, he was to be succeeded by Kâmil Pasha, who began to persecute members of the CUP. The Ottoman Empire's defeat in the Balkan Wars was largely attributed to partisanship and lack of discipline within the military. This defeat gave the CUP the casus belli to return to power. In January 1913, the leadership of the CUP staged a coup, forcing Kâmil Pasha to resign at gunpoint. The leaders of the Saviour Officers escaped to Egypt and Albania. Only in 1914 would the empire conduct an election, this was after the CUP took control over the government following Mahmud Shevket's assassination. CUP governments continued up until the end of the First World War.

== See also ==
- Taksim meeting

== Sources ==
- Kieser, Hans-Lukas (2018). Talaat Pasha: Father of Modern Turkey, Architect of Genocide. Princeton University Press. ISBN 978-0-691-15762-7. (Google Books)
- Shaw, Stanford; Shaw, Ezel (27 May 1977), History of the Ottoman Empire and Modern Turkey, vol. II, Cambridge University Press (published 1975), ISBN 0-521-29166-6
