= Rauf Pasha =

Rauf Pasha may refer to:

- Mehmed Emin Rauf Pasha (1780–1859), Ottoman industrialist and statesman
- Mehmed Rauf Pasha (1838 – 1923), an Ottoman senator and liberal politician
- Mehmed Rauf Pasha bin Abdi Pasha (1832–1908), Ottoman soldier and statesman of Circassian origin.
- Muhammad Rauf Pasha (c.1832–1888), Egyptian soldier and colonial administrator
- Rauf Orbay (1881-1964), Turkish naval officer, statesman and diplomat of Abkhaz origin.
