= Liberty Party (Ottoman Empire) =

Ottoman Liberty Party Osmanlı Ahrar Fırkası
- Leader: Prince Sabahaddin
- Founded: 1908; 118 years ago
- Dissolved: 1910; 116 years ago
- Preceded by: Private Enterprise and Decentralization Association
- Succeeded by: Freedom and Accord
- Headquarters: Constantinople, Ottoman Empire
- Ideology: Liberalism; Liberal nationalism; Constitutionalism; Decentralization
- Political position: Centre

The Ottoman Liberty Party (Ottoman Turkish: Osmanlı Ahrar Fırkası) was a short-lived liberal political party in the Ottoman Empire during the Second Constitutional Era. It was founded by Prince Sabahaddin, Ahmet Samim, Suat Soyer, Ahmet Reşit Rey, Mehmet Tevfik Bey and Nureddin Ferruh Bey.

== Founding ==
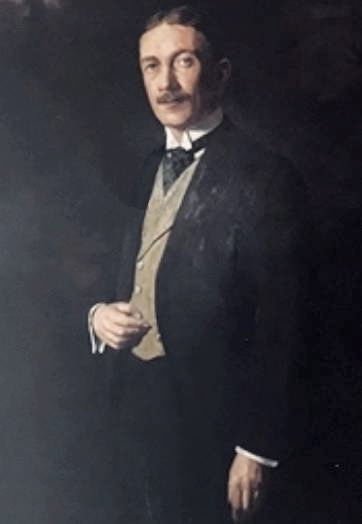
Nureddin Ferruh Bey, one of the founders

Prince Sabahaddin's Private Enterprise and Decentralization League temporarily united with the Committee of Union and Progress (CUP) after the Young Turk Revolution, however disagreements with the CUP's military cadre and the issue of decentralization lead to the Ottoman Liberty Party being founded on September 14, 1908.

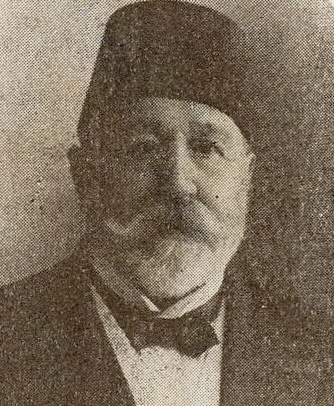
Şevket Bey, member and co-founder

Its founders represented the liberal wing of the Young Turks. Sabahattin did not accept the proposed party chairmanship, but supported the party. No official president was elected to the party. The founders of the party were Nureddin Ferruh, Ahmet Fazlı, Kıbrıslı Tevfik, Nazım, Şevket, Celalettin Arif, Mahir Said (Pekmen), Dr. Nihat Reşat (Belger), Tahir Hayreddin, Ahmet Samim, Damat Salih Pasha, Fazıl, and Mabeyinci Reşit.

The party program was prepared by Nurettin Ferruh. Count Léon Ostrorog assisted in the preparation of the programme by translating foreign party programs.

== 1908 election ==
The Liberty Party did not have much time to organize itself for the 1908 election, and only fielded candidates in Constantinople. İkdam's issue on election day announced that Grand Vizier Kamil Pasha, editor-in-chief of İkdam Ali Kemal, Arif, Fazlı, Ferruh, Pandelâki Kozmidi, Konstantin Konstanidi, Kirkor Zohrap, and Alber Feraci were on the party lists for the capital. Only Hayreddin, Kozmidi, and Zohrab were elected as MPs, and Pekmen was only able to be elected MP from Ankara through his own efforts. Though the party wasn't successful in the election, it managed to cobble together a group of 60-70 deputies made up of independents and CUP defectors in parliament.

== Decline ==
Some members of the party supported the uprising against the CUP in the 31 March Crisis (April 14). In the aftermath of the incident most of its members faced repression from the government, and some went into exile. Ahmet Fazlı and prince Sabahattin were tried in the court martial but found not guilty and released. Ferruh returned to the country in 1910 and issued a statement that the party was dissolved.

Most of its members would reconvene in a new party a year later, known as the Freedom and Accord Party, but it would be suppressed following the 1913 CUP coup d'etat and Mahmud Shevket Pasha's assassination. Freedom and Accord would incarnate itself after the end of World War I, but was defunct by the time of the proclamation of the Republic of Turkey in 1923.

== Ideology ==
The party was modeled from British political tradition and liberal politics. Federalism and de-centralization were core tenets of the party program. The position of the monarchy was not mentioned in the program.

The newspapers İkdam, Sabah, Yeni Gazete, Sadayı Millet and Servet-i Fünun, supported the Liberty party

== See also ==
- Liberalism in Turkey
