= Freedom and Accord Party =

Freedom and Accord Party حریت و ایتلاف فرقه‌سی Hürriyet ve İtilâf Fırkası
- Abbreviation: H-İ or HİF
- Leader: Damat Ferid Pasha; Deli Fuad Pasha; Miralay Sadık; Şerif Pasha
- Founded: 21 November 1911, 10 January 1919
- Dissolved: 25 June 1919
- Merger of: Ottoman Radical Reform Party; People's Party; Moderate Liberty Party
- Preceded by: Liberty Party; Ottoman Democratic Party
- Headquarters: Şehzadebaşı, Istanbul
- Newspaper: Teminat; Mes'ûliyet
- Military wing: Saviour Officers
- Ideology: Anti-İttihadism; Ottomanism; Decentralisation; Anglophilia; Liberal conservatism

The Freedom and Accord Party (Ottoman Turkish: حریت و ایتلاف فرقه‌سی, romanized: Hürriyet ve İtilâf Fırkası, French: Entente Libérale) was a liberal Ottoman political party active between 1911–1913 and 1918–1919, during the Second Constitutional Era. It was the most significant opposition to Committee of Union and Progress (CUP). The political programme of the party advocated for Ottomanism, government decentralisation, the rights of ethnic minorities, and close relations with Britain. In the post-1918 Ottoman Empire, the party became known for its attempts to suppress and prosecute the CUP.

In both of its periods of existence, the party struggled with internal divisions among its diverse factions, resulting in a disorganised opposition to the CUP.

== Name ==
The Freedom and Accord Party (Turkish: Hürriyet ve İtilâf Fırkası) is sometimes conflated with its predecessor, the Liberty Party, and the two organisations are often known collectively as the Liberal Union or the Liberal Entente. In the Ottoman Empire, its members were known as İtilâfçılar or Itilafists, who were opposed to members of the rival Union and Progress Party İttihadcılar or İttihadists (roughly translatable as "Unionists").

== Base and members ==
The party was founded through the contributions of Turks and non-Turks; the most prominent non-Turkish ethnicities which formed the base of the party and its predecessors, the Liberty Party, were Greeks (e.g. M. Konêmênos), Arabs (e.g. Esad Tawfiq Efendi), Kurds (e.g. Lütfi Fikri Bey) and Albanians (e.g. Hasan Prishtina).

Minorities in the Empire, including Greeks, Armenians, Slavs and Albanians, as well as Circassians, Arabs and Kurds largely supported the party, as they were alarmed by the CUP's Turkish nationalist policies. They had made an agreement with the Rum Meşrutiyet Cemiyeti (Greek Constitutional Society) for mutual support. Jews mostly opposed the party and supported the CUP.

Notable members included Mehmed Sabahaddin, Kâmil Pasha, Rıza Tevfik Bölükbaşı, Ali Kemal, Refik Halit Karay, Rıza Nur, Mehmed Hâdî Pasha, Damat Ferid Pasha, Mehmed Rauf Pasha, Mizancı Murat, Gümülcineli İsmail, Reşat Halis, and Lütfi Fikri.

== Origins ==
Sabahaddin's Private Enterprise and Decentralization League, which advocated for administrative decentralisation, eventually organised itself into the Liberty Party to participate in the 1908 election, proving to be the Committee of Union and Progress's (CUP) main opponent. It was suppressed and eventually disbanded following the 31 March Incident. Various smaller parties existed between 1910 and 1911 that proved to be ineffective as opposition to the CUP.

== History ==
=== 1911–1913 ===
The Freedom and Accord Party declared itself a party on 21 November 1911, and immediately attracted 70 deputies to its ranks. On 24 November it had its first party congress, where Damat Ferid Pasha was made president and Miralay Sadık vice president. Nearly 100 branches of the party were opened in Istanbul and Anatolia.

Only 20 days after its formation, Freedom and Accord won a significant by-election in Constantinople by one vote. It was the main challenger to the CUP during the April 1912 elections, which the Committee rigged in favor of itself, giving Freedom and Accord only 6 seats of 275 total. The rigged election caused uprisings in many provinces, until pro-İtilafist officers known as the Savior Officers issued a memorandum to the pro-CUP Grand Vizier Mehmed Said Pasha, who was forced to resign. Ahmed Muhtar Pasha's suprapartisan Great Cabinet followed, which was supported by the Savior Officers and Freedom and Accord.

Catastrophe in the First Balkan War lead to the collapse of this government, and Kâmil Pasha, who was an ardent anti-İttihadist, returned to the premiership with the hope to sign a more favorable peace settlement in London to end the war, and also to ban the CUP. At a party congress held from 2–9 June 1912, Deli Fuad Pasha was elected as the party president, though he left the party by 1 January 1913. During the Balkan War, the party came under the influence of Miralay Sadık and Gümülcineli İsmail Hakkı, who planned to overthrow the Kâmil Pasha government in a putsch on 25 January 1913. However the CUP undertook a coup d'état two days before they could on 23 January 1913, and İsmail Enver forced Kâmil Pasha to resign the premiership at gun point. The purges following the coup targeted anti-İttihadist opposition, most of whom were arrested or fled abroad. Şerif Pasha, was appointed as the chairman of party organisation abroad, and Sadık as the vice chairman, but Şerif Pasha also resigned shortly thereafter.

At the end of March a plot was discovered by an associate of Prince Sabahaddin, forcing Sabahaddin and Dr. Nihat Reşat (Belger) to flee abroad. The CUP took advantage of Grand Vizier Mahmut Şevket Pasha's assassination on 11 June 1913 to crush all opposition completely. Most İtilafists were sentenced to death in absentia. 322 people (601 people according to Burhan Felek), who were known anti-İttihadists were exiled to Sinop.

For 5 years the party was practically defunct, though party leaders established relations with Britain and denounced the İttihadist dictatorship. It was re-established in the aftermath of the World War I.

=== 1918–1920 ===
With the Ottoman Empire losing on all fronts in by the end of WWI, Talat Pasha's government fell. A general amnesty was declared and exiles from Sinop and abroad began to return to Constantinople.

On 17 November 1918, Mustafa Sabri Efendi a former deputy of Tokat, declared the reorganisation of the Freedom and Accord Party. In the following days, news emerged that Freedom and Accord branches were opened in various parts of the country. In a meeting held on 10 January 1919, the Freedom and Accord Party was officially re-established. The new board of directors consisted mostly of elderly and retired state officials close to the palace. Former chairman Damat Ferid Pasha did not join the party. Mustafa Sabri, Ali Kemal, Rıza Tevfik, and Refik Halit (Karay), former and active members of the party, took part in its management. The most important spokespersons of the party in the press were Ali Kemal and Refi Cevat (Ulunay). The party was supported by the Sultan, Mehmed VI.

Some members of the party advocated for the Ottoman Empire to become a League of Nations Mandate, an attitude that was also initially considered by a few ex-İttihadist. However the leadership were united in having close relations with Britain, and many joined the Friends of England Association.

The party fiercely opposed the Turkish nationalist movement for being unreconstructed İttihadist, which they blamed for all problems the Ottoman Empire faced post-war. When this attack didn't work their organs accused them of being Bolsheviks. While Ottoman politicians were anticipating the call of a new election after the dissolution of parliament, Freedom and Accord reopened its branches in Istanbul in other provinces, though it found no support in Anatolia. 8 May 1919, Miralay Sadık returned to Istanbul from Egypt, and once again took over the leadership of the party.

The first cabinet of Damat Ferid Pasha, which was established on 3 March 1919, was generally regarded as the "Government of Freedom and Accord". In reality, the party had no real share in power, except by contributing one or two members to the government. According to Refik Halit (Karay), Ferid Pasha "used the party like a winter cardigan." On 25 June, Freedom and Accord's central committee declared that there was no relationship between the government and the party, and announced any Accordist minister still in cabinet had to choose between losing their job or their party affiliation. On 21 July, the central committee declared the government of Damat Ferid illegitimate and demanded his immediate resignation. The Ministry of the Interior issued a warning that it would not tolerate partisan intervention in the government. Mustafa Sabri and Miralay Sadık disagreed with carrying out the ultimatum, until Sabri attempted to establish a new party called the National Conservative Party.

In the last Ottoman parliamentary elections held in November 1919, Freedom and Accord and the groups that split from it boycotted the election. The election resulted in a decisive victory of the pro-Association for the Defense of National Rights of Anatolia and Rumelia party known as Felah-ı Vatan.

When Sabri wasn't appointed Sheikh-ul-Islam in the 4th Ferid Pasha government, Sadık took the opportunity to do a party takeover, purging him and his supporters. This led to the foundation of the Moderate Freedom and Accord Party on 1 June 1920, temporarily led by Rıza Tevfik. This party entered the 5th Ferid Pasha government, but was opposed by Sâdık Bey and his supporters in the original Freedom and Accord Party, who were now considered extremists. Divided and politically bankrupt, the Freedom and Accord Party could not exert any political power for the rest of the Ottoman Empire's history, and gradually lost its strength as the Turkish Nationalist Movement gained traction. Most members fled the Ottoman Empire after the Great Offensive and were put on the list of 150 personae non gratae.

== Media ==
The most notable newspaper known as the media organ of the party is Mesûliyet (27 August – 15 September 1919), which was only published nineteen issues by Balalı Şehsüvarzâde Hacı Osman Bey, the treasurer of the party. Other pro-Freedom and Accord newspapers included the Tanzimat, Teminat, Şehrah, İkdam, İktiham, Sabah and Yeni Gazete.

== Elections ==
| Election year votes | Seats won | +/– | Position |
|---|---|---|---|
| 1912 | 6 / 275 | New | Opposition |

== See also ==
- Miralay Sadık Bey
- Society for the Rise of Kurdistan
