= Ahmet Samim =

Turkish politician

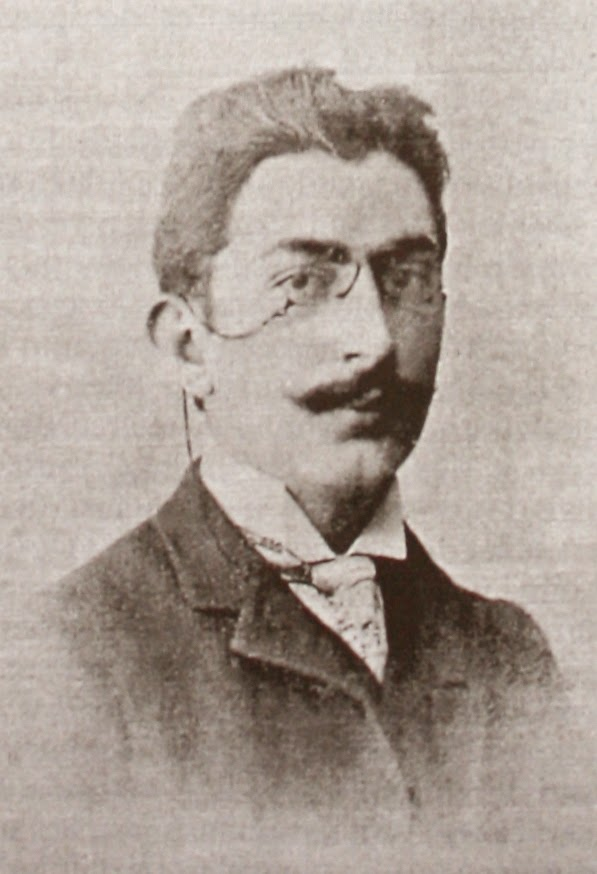

Personal details
- Born: 1884 Prizren, Ottoman Empire (modern Kosovo)
- Died: 1910 (aged 25–26) Constantinople, Ottoman Empire (modern Istanbul, Turkey)
- Party: Liberty Party

Ahmet Samim (1884 – 1910) was an Ottoman-Turkish journalist and politician, who was a founding member of the Liberty Party. Despite warnings from his former mentor Süleyman Nesib to stay away from politics, he did not listen and was assassinated in 1910 because of his political views.
