= Mehmed Rauf Pasha =

Ottoman senator and liberal politician (1838–1923)

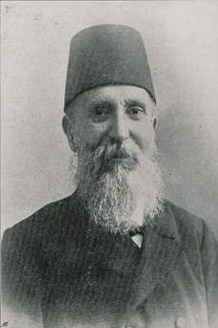

Personal details
- Born: 1838 Istanbul, Ottoman Empire
- Died: 1923 (aged 84–85) Istanbul, Turkey
- Party: Freedom and Accord Party

Mehmed Sherif Rauf Pasha (1838 – 1923) was an Ottoman senator and liberal politician during the Second Constitutional Era, who was a member of the Freedom and Accord Party. A fluent French speaker and strident reformer, he participated in writing the constitution of the Ottoman Empire in 1876 and was a close supporter of fellow reformist Midhat Pasha.

Rauf Pasha was the governor of Jerusalem for 12 years (1877-1889), during which he put down strengthened the administrative apparatus in the province, organized a population census in 1883, built roads, and put down tribal rebellions in the Gaza region. One of these roads included the southern road connecting Jerusalem to Hebron, which was completed in May 1888. Subsequent roads, including the 1892 east road connecting Jerusalem to Jericho, was opened and helped establish Jerusalem as the centre of a modern and coherent network of both roads and regional administration.

After Jerusalem, he was appointed as governor of Beirut (1889), Erzurum (1895-1901), and Salonica (1904-1908).
