= Mahmud Shevket Pasha =

Ottoman military commander and statesman (1856–1913)

- محمود شوكت
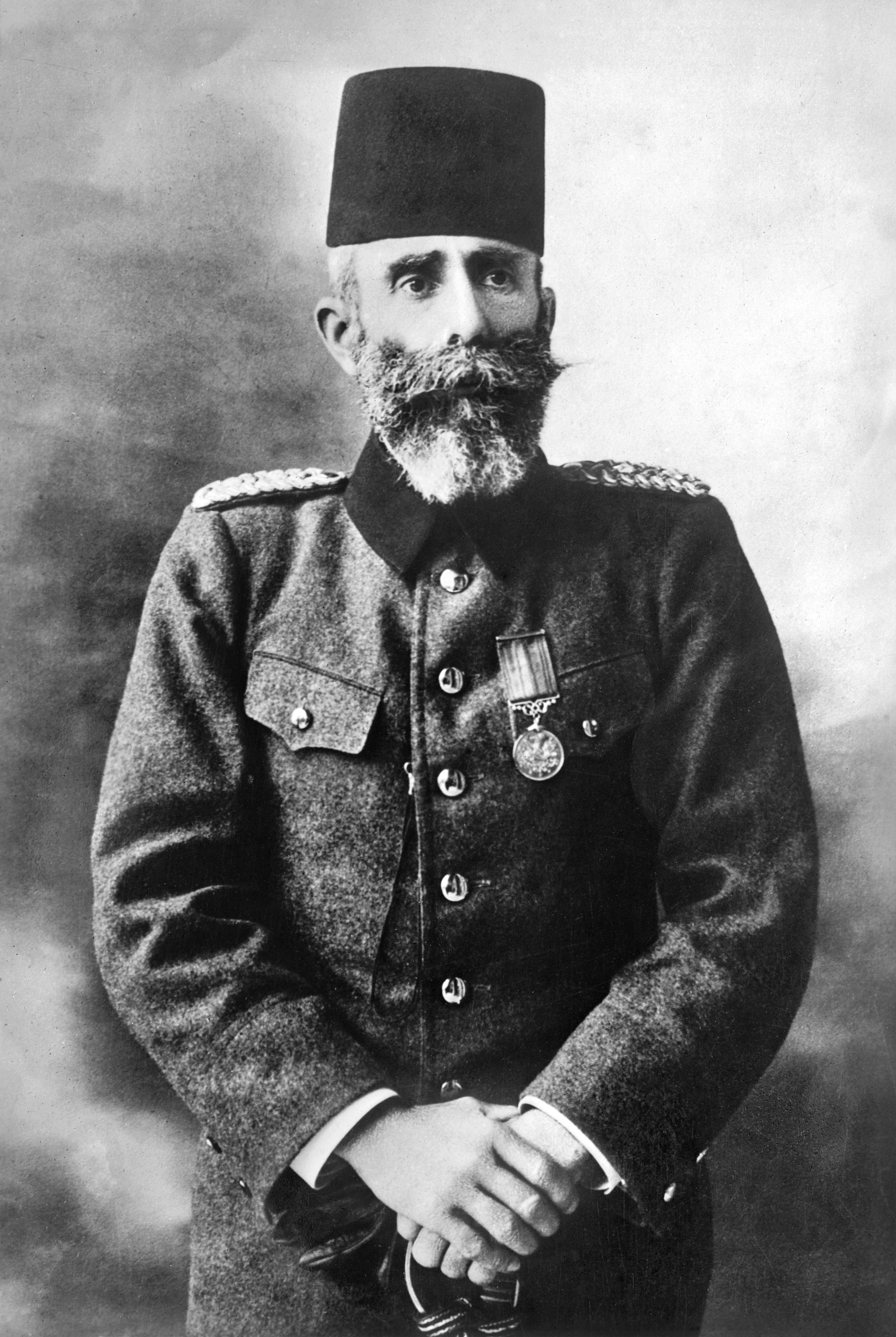

Grand Vizier of the Ottoman Empire
- In office 23 January 1913 – 11 June 1913
- Monarch: Mehmed V
- Preceded by: Kâmil Pasha
- Succeeded by: Said Halim Pasha

Minister of War
- In office 23 January 1913 – 11 June 1913
- Monarch: Mehmed V
- Grand Vizier: Himself
- Preceded by: Nazım Pasha
- Succeeded by: Ahmet İzzet Pasha
- In office 12 January 1910 – 9 July 1912
- Monarch: Mehmed V
- Grand Vizier: İbrahim Hakkı Pasha; Mehmed Said Pasha
- Preceded by: Salih Hulusi Pasha
- Succeeded by: Hurşid Pasha

Personal details
- Born: 1856 Baghdad, Ottoman Iraq
- Died: 11 June 1913 (aged 56 or 57) Istanbul, Ottoman Empire
- Cause of death: Assassination
- Resting place: Monument of Liberty, Istanbul
- Relations: Khaled Sulayman Faiq (brother), Hikmet Sulayman (brother)
- Education: Mekteb-i Harbiye

Military service
- Allegiance: Ottoman Empire
- Branch/service: Ottoman Army
- Rank: Field Marshal
- Commands: Third Army; Action Army
- Battles/wars: Macedonian Struggle; 31 March Incident; Albanian Revolt of 1910; Yemeni Revolt; Albanian Revolt of 1912; First Balkan War; Bulgarian Front

Mahmud Shevket Pasha (Ottoman Turkish: محمود شوكت پاشا, Turkish: Mahmut Şevket Paşa; 1856 – 11 June 1913) was an Ottoman military commander and statesman.

During the 31 March Incident in 1909, Shevket Pasha and the Committee of Union and Progress overthrew Abdul Hamid II after an anti-Constitutionalist uprising in Constantinople. He played the role of a military dictator, surpassing the power of the CUP and the Grand Viziers after the crisis, with many observers ascribing to him the title of "generalissimo". As War Minister, he introduced military reform, including the incorporation of the empire's Air Squadrons. Shevket Pasha became Grand Vizier during the First Balkan War, in the aftermath of the CUP's 23 January 1913 coup d'état, resuming war with the Balkan League. He was assassinated 6 months later by partisans of the Freedom and Accord Party, as part of a larger counter-coup attempt against the CUP.

== Early life and career ==
Mahmud Shevket was born in Baghdad in 1856. His grandfather, Hacı Talib Ağa had moved from Tbilisi to Baghdad. His father was Basra governor Kethüdazade Süleyman Faik Bey. He had four brothers, Numan, Murad, Khaled, and the much younger Hikmat, the latter two would become important statesmen of post Ottoman rule Iraq. Raised as an Ottoman, most sources claim that he had Georgian, Chechen, or Iraqi Arab ancestry. However, according to Celal Bayar and Rıza Tevfik Bölükbaşı, the relatives of the pasha told them that his father was of Georgian and his mother of Arab origin. In addition to Turkish and Arabic, he spoke French and German.

He finished his primary and secondary education in Baghdad before going to Alliance Israélite Universelle of Constantinople (now Istanbul). After completing his education in the Mekteb-i Harbiye in 1882 he served in Crete as a lieutenant before returning as a faculty member the next year. Shevket rose through the ranks, eventually serving on the general staff and achieving the rank of Miralay (Colonel) in 1891. He joined an arms purchasing commission sent to Germany to supervise the manufacture of war matériel for the Ottoman army, during which he worked as an assistant to Colmar Freiherr von der Goltz. There he wrote extensively on the Mauser rifle as it entered into operation in the Ottoman Army. Upon his return in 1899, he was promoted to brigadier general and appointed deputy chairman of the Tophane-i Amire's Inspection Commission. In 1901, he was promoted to Ferik (Lieutenant General) and was soon assigned to the Hejaz railway to oversee construction of the Mecca–Medina telegraph line. He perceived this assignment as an exile, which likely tainted his opinion of Sultan Abdul Hamid II's regime. During this period he also spent some time in France studying military technology.

In 1905 Mahmud Shevket Pasha was appointed governor of the Kosovo Vilayet during the height of the Macedonian Conflict, where he gained respect from the army for his effectiveness. He made contact with the Committee of Union and Progress (CUP) and turned a blind eye to their anti-regime activism. Thus began his complex and tenuous relationship with the "Sacred Committee". When the CUP prevailed in the 1908 Young Turk Revolution, which forced Sultan Abdul Hamid to reinstate the Ottoman constitution and call for elections, Shevket was placed in command of the Selanik-based Third Army (now Thessaloniki).

In 1902 he published Ottoman Military Organization and Uniforms from the Establishment of the Ottoman State to the Present (Turkish: Devlet-i Osmâniyye’nin Bidâyet-i Tesisinden Şimdiye Kadar Osmanlı Teşkilât ve Kıyâfet-i Askeriyesi) which is considered to be one of the most comprehensive studies written on the history of the Ottoman army and its uniforms.

== 31 March Incident ==
A year later saw the 31 March Incident, when counter-revolutionary reactionaries rose up in support of Abdulhamid's absolutist rule and the Constitution was once again repealed. The CUP appealed to Shevket Pasha to restore the status quo, and he organized the Action Army, an ad hoc formation made up of his Third Army and elements of the First and Second Armies to suppress the uprising. The Third Army was still entirely loyal to the CUP under Shevket’s command. His chief of staff during the crisis was the first president of the Republic of Turkey, captain Mustafa Kemal (Atatürk). The Action Army entered Constantinople on 24 April, and after a series of negotiations, Abdulhamid II was deposed, Mehmed V Reshad ascended to the throne, the Constitution was reinstated for the third and last time, and the CUP was allowed to form a government.

== War Minister ==
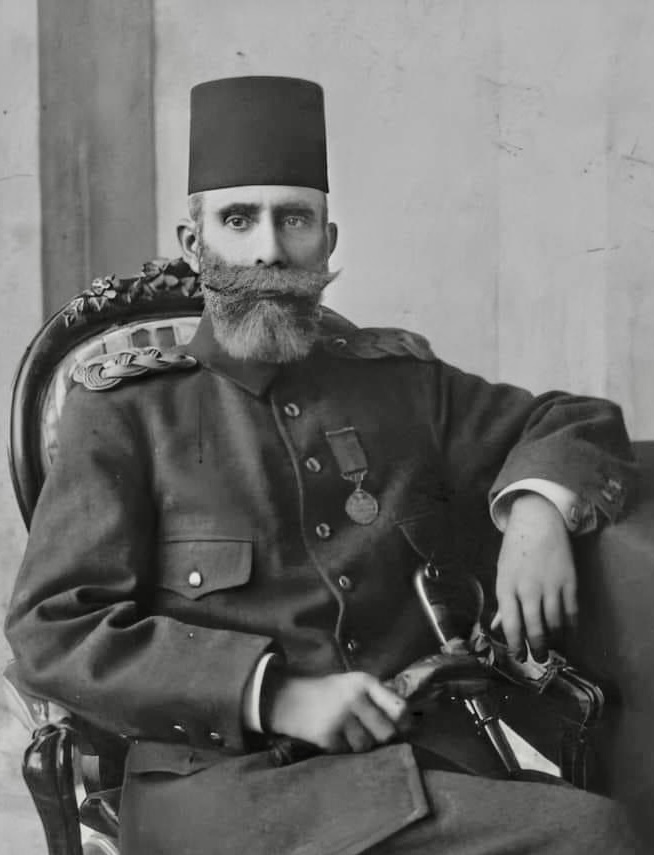
Mahmut Shevket Pasha

After the incident, he became an important power holder in Ottoman politics: Shevket Pasha was made martial law Commander of Constantinople, inspector of the First, Second, and Third Armies, and Minister of War. Though Hüseyin Hilmi Pasha came back to form a government, his premiership was widely seen as being under Shevket Pasha's control. His War Ministry worked to keep officers away from politics, especially the CUP. His tenure as War Minister saw the suppression of the 1910 Albanian Revolt. He also used troops from Tripolitania to suppress Yahya Muhammad Hamid ed-Din's revolt in Yemen, which exposed Tripolitania to foreign invasion from Italy in 1911. Hilmi's resignation saw Ibrahim Hakki elevated to the Grand Vezierate, and Shevket was also included in cabinet as War Minister.

Shevket Pasha is credited for the creation of Ottoman Air Divisions in 1911. He gave much importance to a military aviation program and as a result the Ottoman Empire held some of the most pioneering aviation institutions in the world.

In an interview with The New York Times, he pushed for Christians to make up 25% of the Ottoman army, and for good relations with the United States.

Though he saved the CUP in the 31 March Incident, Shevket also played a pivotal role in the 1912 coup which caused the fall of the CUP government. His resignation as War Minister was an effective endorsement to the Savior Officers, who were able to maneuver around the Unionist parliament and shuttered it, driving them underground. Thereafter he served as a senator.

== Premiership and assassination ==
During the First Balkan War, the Ottoman Empire lost all of its Balkan possessions except the outskirts of Constantinople. The CUP overthrew Kâmil Pasha's Savior Officer backed government in January 1913 in a coup known as the Raid on the Sublime Porte, because he entered negotiations with the Balkan League. Shevket Pasha was made Grand Vizier, War Minister, Foreign Minister and Field Marshal in a national unity government that included the CUP, and resumed fighting in the war. However, the change in government did not change the reality that the war and most of Rumelia was lost. The Treaty of London ended the First Balkan War, though Shevket Pasha's government never signed the treaty. He also decided to abandon Qatar to Britain to shore up Iraq's security, a move which cabinet ministers Küçük Said Pasha, Oskan Mardikyan, and Nicolae Batzaria objected to. However Turkish troops continued to occupy Qatar until 1915.

The Ottoman Empire would recover Eastern Thrace and Edirne in the Second Balkan War, but by then Shevket Pasha would be dead. On 11 June 1913 Mahmud Shevket Pasha was assassinated in his car in Beyazit Square in a revenge attack by a relative of the assassinated War Minister Nazım Pasha, who was killed during the 1913 coup. When Shevket's car stopped in the square for roadside repairs, at least five gunmen fired ten shots from another vehicle. He was buried in the Monument of Liberty, dedicated to soldiers of the Action Army who were killed in the 31 March Incident. The car he was in, the uniform he was wearing, the clothes of his murdered aides, and the weapons used in the assassination are on display at the Istanbul Military Museum. He was survived by his wife, Selime Dilşad Hanım, with whom he had no children.

With Shevket Pasha's assassination, the CUP took complete control over Ottoman politics. A martial law tribunal handed out several death sentences to real or alleged conspirators, with 12 being executed on 24 June. Many death sentences were doled out among the leadership of the Freedom and Accord Party, which since the Raid of the Sublime Porte were exiled in several countries. Opposition leaders still in the capital were exiled to Sinop.

On the day of his assassination, a deputy of the Freedom and Accord Party, Lütfi Fikri stated "In the full sense of the word, Mahmud Şevket Pasha has committed suicide, and this was decided on the day he accepted the grand vezierate over the corpse of Nâzım Pasha. I am sure that this man did not like, for instance, Talaat Bey and his friends. How could it be that he became, to such a degree, a toy in their hands and died for this reason?"

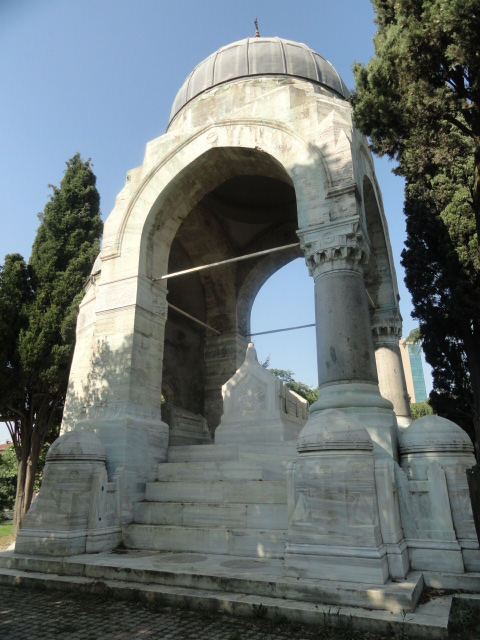
Mahmut Shavket Pasha's grave in the Monument of Liberty

== Legacy ==
Mahmud Shevket Pasha represented the last independent personality in the Empire's politics; the successor of the premiership, Said Halim Pasha, would be a puppet of the CUP's radical faction, headed by the triumvirate of Talat, Enver, and Cemal, all of whom would finally enter the cabinet following his death. Enver Pasha took Shevket Pasha's old post of Minister of War by 1914, and Talat in addition to returning to the interior ministry after his assassination, himself became Grand Vizier in 1917. Shevket Pasha's assassination allowed the CUP, primarily Talat Pasha, to establish a radical nationalist dictatorship that would last until the Ottoman Empire's defeat in World War I in 1918. This dictatorship would see the empire retake Edirne in the Second Balkan War, but also join and lose World War I while committing genocide against its Christian minorities.

Shevket Pasha was the last Ottoman Grand Vizier to die in office. He was the only grand vizier to have written memoirs.

A town in Beykoz, Istanbul is named after him. The name of the town Tirilye was changed to Mahmutşevketpaşa in his memory after his assassination, but would rename itself to Zeytinbağı in 1963.

== Shevket Pasha's speech to the Action Army ==
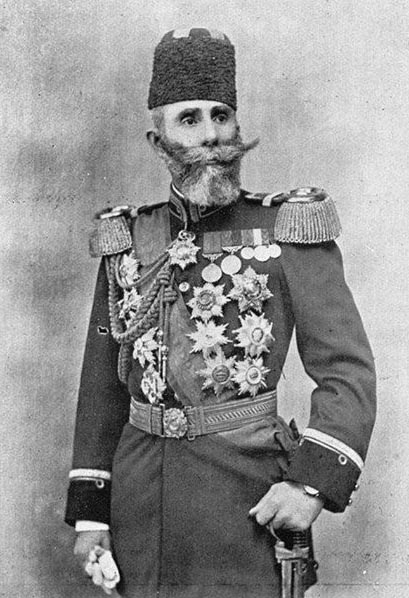
Mahmud Shevket Pasha, 1900 military uniform full-sized photograph

In a 2012 interview with Habertürk, Murat Bardakçı publicized what he claimed was the first ever audio recording made in the Ottoman Empire, which was Mahmud Shevket Pasha's rallying speech to the troops of the Action Army, urging them to march on Istanbul and overthrow the sultan. While a YouTube video recording of the speech has gone viral, its veracity has been controversial. A study by the historian Derya Tulga concluded that it is impossible for an original audio recording of Shevket Pasha's 1909 speech to exist, and even assuming it is Mahmud Shevket Pasha's voice, the recording was ultimately a reenactment produced two years after the 31 March Incident, which he would have done for propaganda purposes. She goes further to state that the voice in the recording is most likely not even Shevket Pasha's but instead the Turkish representative of Favorite Platten Record Company Ahmet Şükrü Bey. Mehmet Çalışkan came to a similar conclusion, adding that the words of the speech itself can't be verified to be Shevket Pasha's, and points out that Ahmet Şükrü promoted the voice recording on a 15 August 1911 issue of the CUP mouthpiece Tanin.

== Works ==
Shevket Pasha wrote several books in addition to his memoirs. He also translated Alphonse Karr's Sous les Tilleuls.

- Logaritma Cedâvili Risalesi (from Jean Dupuis, H. 1301)
- Fenn-i Esliha (H. 1301)
- Usûl-i Hendese I-II (H. 1302-1304)
- Asâkir-i Şahanenin Piyade Sınıfına Mahsus 87 Modeli Mükerrer Ateşli Mavzer üzer Tüfeği (H. 1303)
- Mükerrer Ateşli Tüfekler (H.1308)
- Küçük Çaplı Mavzer Tüfekleri Risâlesi (H. 1311)
- Küçük Çaplı Mavzer Tüfeklerine Mahsus Atlas (H.1311)
- Devlet-i Osmâniyye’nin Bidâyet-i Tesisinden Şimdiye Kadar Osmanlı Teşkilât ve Kıyâfet-i Askeriyesi (I-III, H. 1320)

== Gallery ==
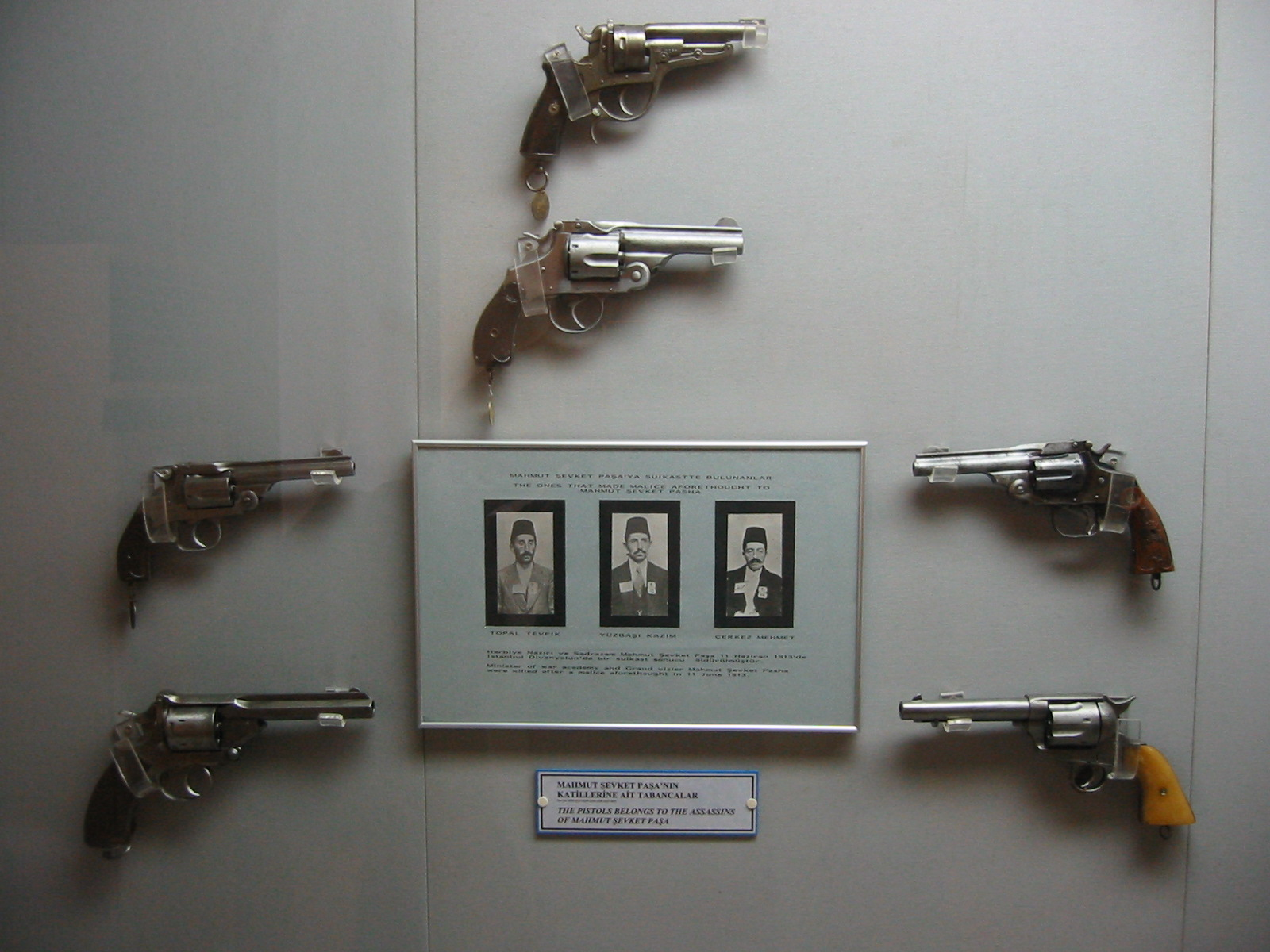
The pistols carried by Mahmud Shevket Pasha's assassins.

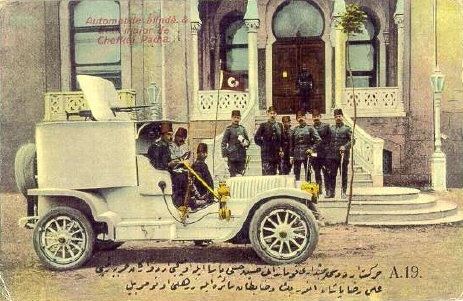
1904 Hotchkiss automitrailleuse afront the General Staff Headquarters in Istanbul, 1909.

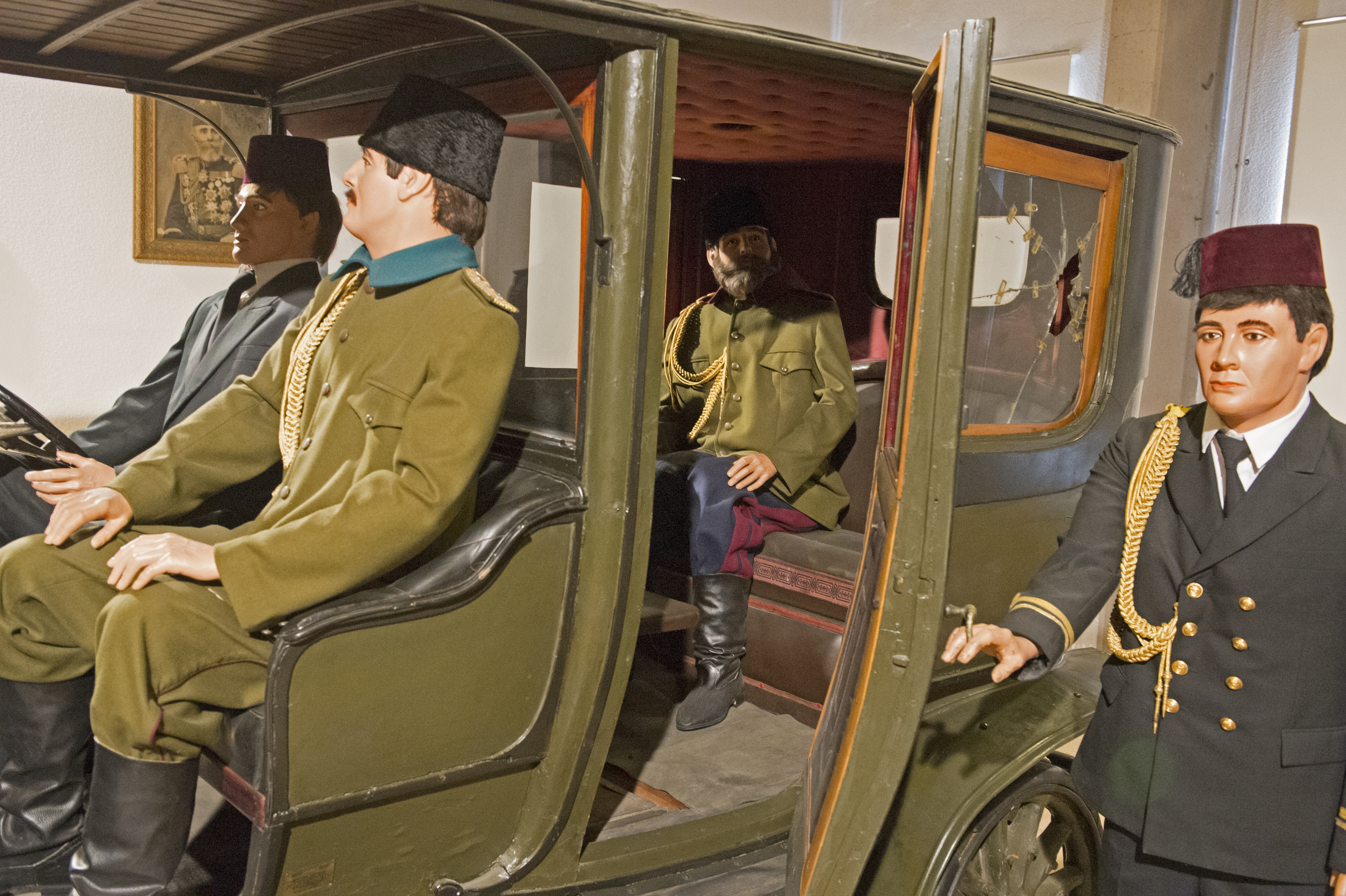
Mahmud Shevket Pasha just before his murder, Istanbul Military Museum.

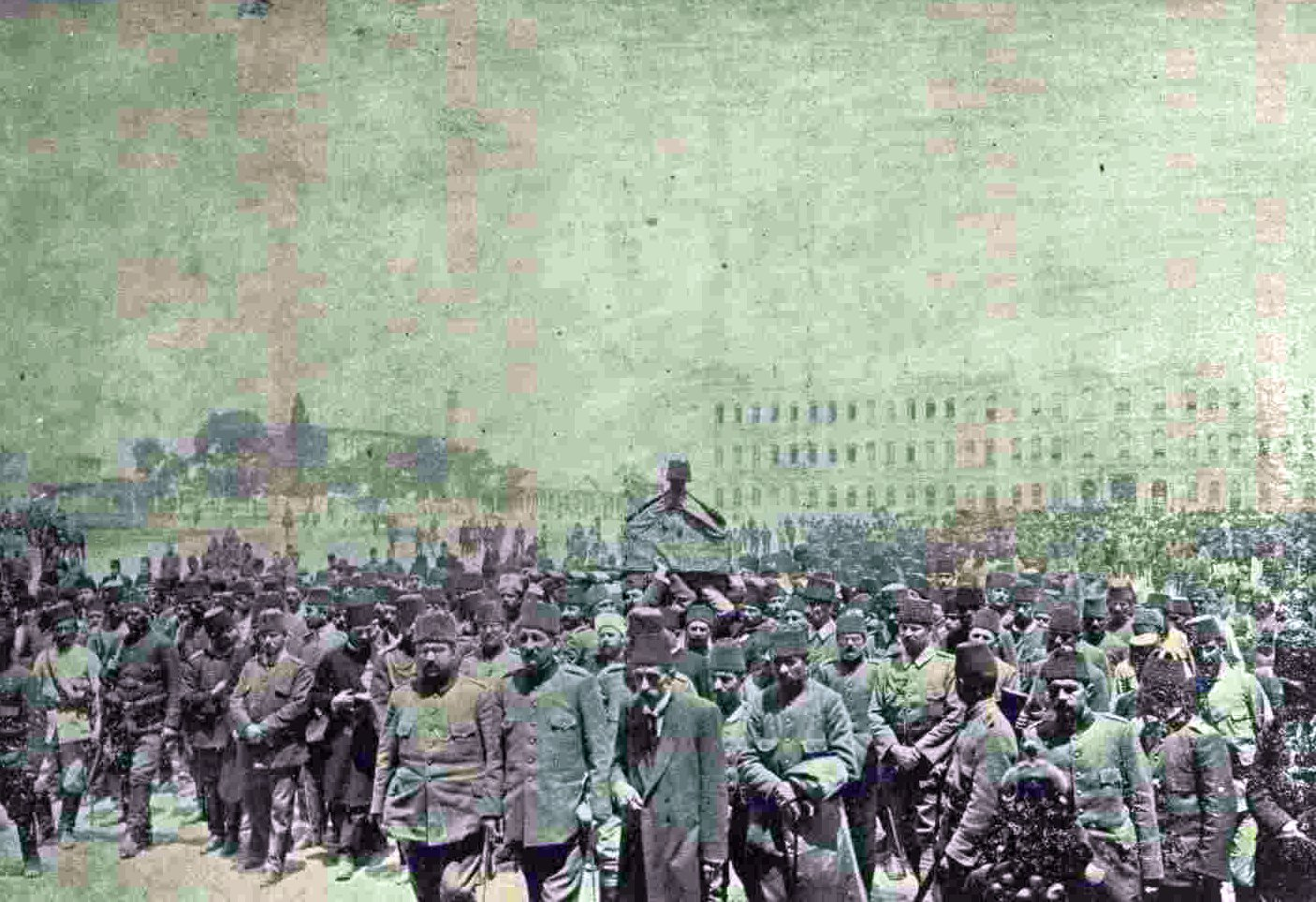
Shevket Pasha's funeral

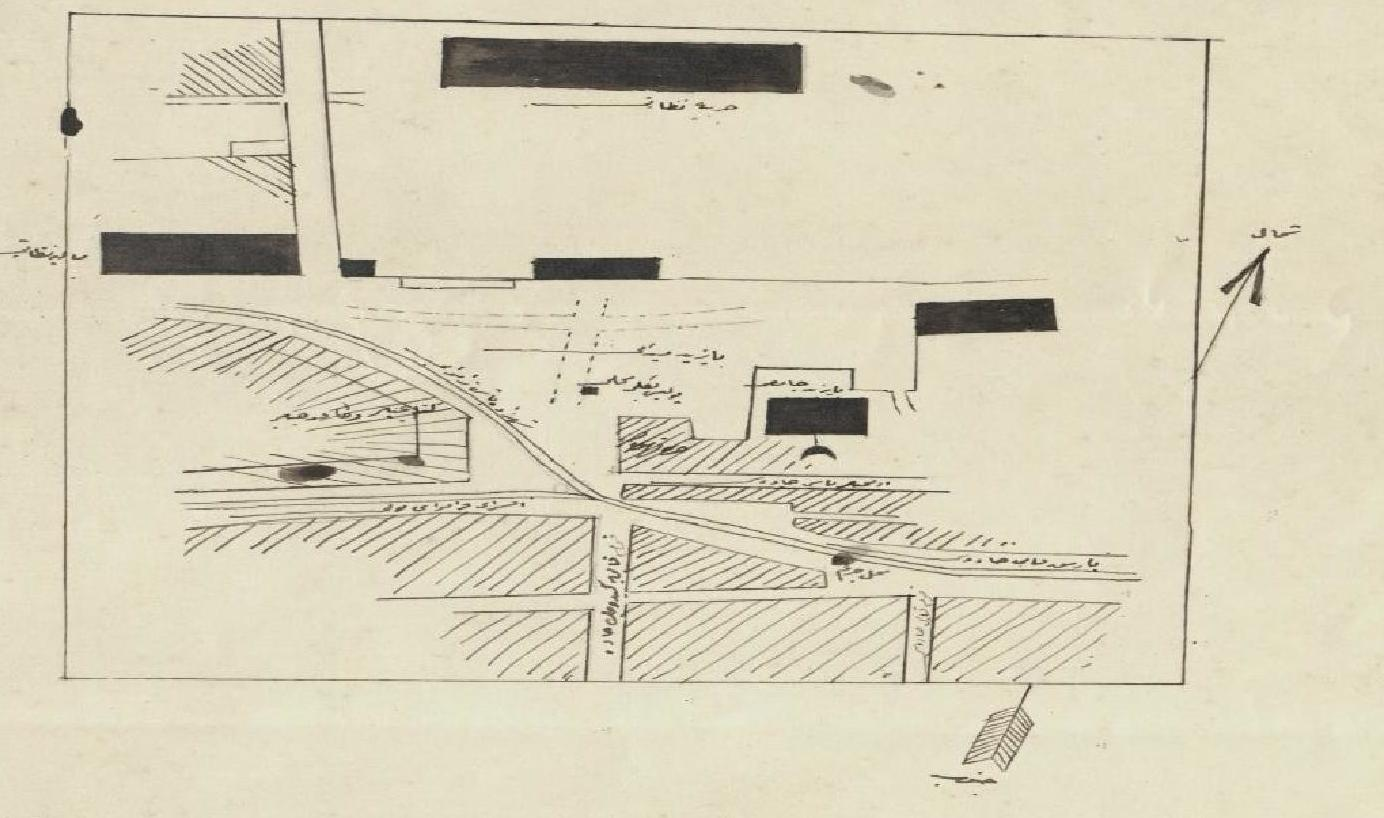
Sketch of events of Shevket Pasha's assassination in the report written by the police chief of Istanbul

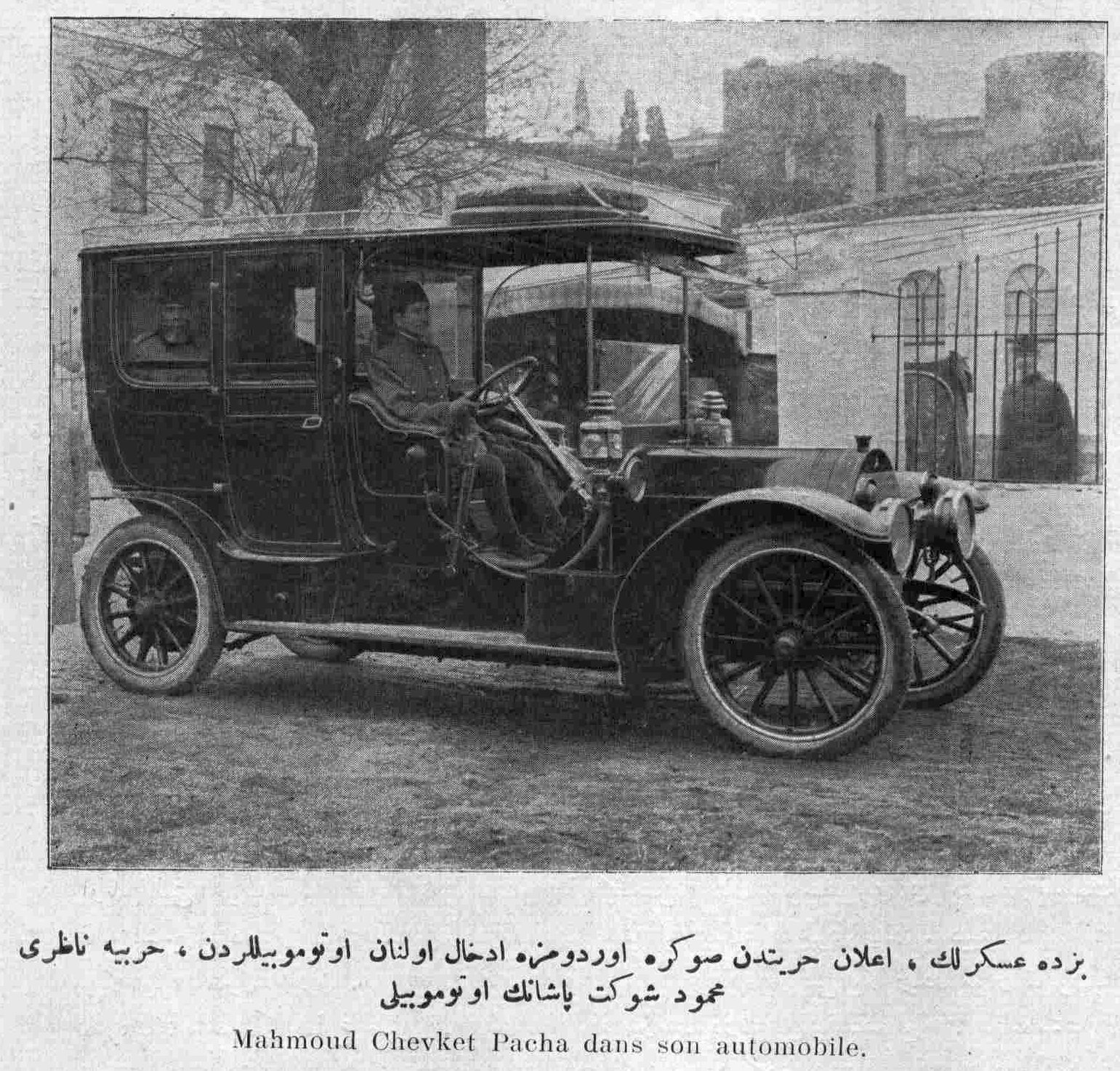
Mahmud Shevket Pasha in a car, 1911

== See also ==
- Miralay Sadık Bey

== Sources ==
- Beckett, Ian F. W. (2012). The Making of the First World War. Connecticut, US: Yale University Press. ISBN 978-0-300-16202-8.
- Gawrych, George (2006). The Crescent and the Eagle: Ottoman Rule, Islam and the Albanians, 1874–1913. London: IB Tauris. ISBN 978-1-84511-287-5.
- Kieser, Hans-Lukas (2018). Talaat Pasha: Father of Modern Turkey, Architect of Genocide. Princeton University Press. ISBN 978-0-691-15762-7. (Google Books)
- Shaw, Stanford; Shaw, Ezel (27 May 1977), History of the Ottoman Empire and Modern Turkey, vol. II, Cambridge University Press (published 1975), ISBN 0-521-29166-6
- Zürcher, Erik Jan (2017). "31 Mart: A Fundamentalist Uprising in Istanbul in April 1909?". In Lévy-Aksu, Noémi; Georgeon, François (eds.). The Young Turk Revolution and the Ottoman Empire: The Aftermath of 1918. I.B.Tauris. ISBN 9781786720214.

| Preceded by Kibrisli Mehmed Kamil Pasha | Grand Vizier; 1913 | Succeeded by Said Halim Pasha |
