= 1913 Ottoman coup d'état =

Coup d'etat that took place in the Ottoman Empire in 1913

1913 Ottoman coup d'etat
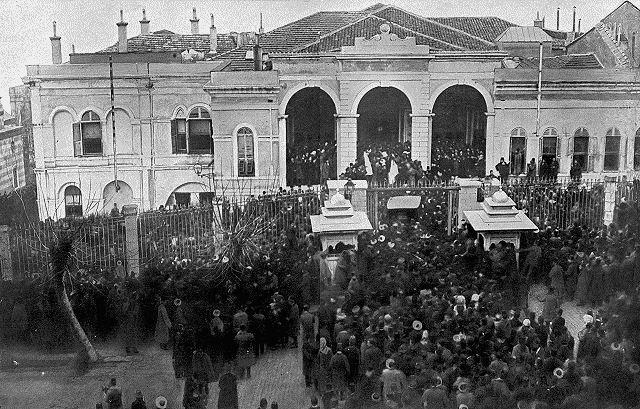
- Crowd gathering in front of the main Sublime Porte (Turkish: Bâb-ı Âlî) building shortly after the coup inside
Date	23 January 1913
Location	Constantinople, Ottoman Empire
Result	Committee of Union and Progress victory: Kâmil Pasha overthrown.; CUP forms a national unity government.; Resumption of the First Balkan War.

Belligerents
Committee of Union and Progress	(Ottoman Empire) Ottoman Government

Commanders and leaders
Ismail Enver; Mehmed Talât; Kara Kemal; Yakub Cemil	(Ottoman Empire) Mehmed Kâmil Pasha (surrendered) (Ottoman Empire) Nazım Pasha X

The 1913 Ottoman coup d'état (23 January 1913), also known as the Raid on the Sublime Porte (Turkish: Bâb-ı Âlî Baskını), was a coup d'état carried out in the Ottoman Empire by a number of Committee of Union and Progress (CUP) members led by Ismail Enver Bey and Mehmed Talât Bey, in which the group made a surprise raid on the central Ottoman government buildings, the Sublime Porte (Turkish: Bâb-ı Âlî).

The coup occurred in the context of toxic partisanship in the Ottoman Empire between the CUP and the Freedom and Accord Party, including a fraudulent April 1912 general election benefiting the CUP and a coup against them in July. After receiving the permission of Sultan Mehmed V to form a new government in October 1912, Kâmil Pasha engaged in diplomatic talks with Bulgaria after the unsuccessful First Balkan War. With the looming Bulgarian demand for the cession of the former Ottoman capital city of Adrianople (today, and in Turkish at the time, known as Edirne) and the outrage among the Turkish populace and CUP leadership, the CUP carried out their coup on January 23, 1913. The Minister of War, Nazım Pasha, was killed and the Grand Vizier, Kâmil Pasha, was forced to resign. The government was then led by the triumvirate known as the "Three Pashas": Enver, Talât, and Cemal Pasha.

After the coup, opposition parties were subject to heavy repression. The new government led by Mahmud Şevket Pasha with Unionist support withdrew the Ottoman Empire from the ongoing London Peace Conference and resumed the war against the Balkan states to recover Edirne and the rest of Rumelia, but to no avail. After his assassination in June, the CUP would take full control of the empire, and opposition leaders would be arrested or exiled to Europe. Ottoman victory in the Second Balkan War and the recovery of Edirne in the face of pressure by the Entente powers moved the CUP closer to Germany ahead of World War I.

== Immediate pretext ==
While the inner circle of the CUP may already have decided earlier to stage a coup to return to power, the proximate occasion was the CUP's fear that the government would concede to a demand by the Great Powers that the town of Adrianople (a former Ottoman capital city) be handed over to Bulgaria after the disastrous results of the First Balkan War for the Ottoman Empire.

== Background ==
=== April 1912 elections and aftermath ===
In the 1908 elections, the Committee of Union and Progress (CUP) had only managed to win about 60 of the 288 seats in the Chamber of Deputies (Turkish: Meclis-i Mebusân), the popularly elected lower house of the General Assembly. Nevertheless, it was the largest party in the Chamber.

The Freedom and Accord Party (Liberal Union/Entente) was founded on 21 November 1911 by those in opposition to the CUP, and immediately attracted 70 Deputies to its ranks. Only 20 days after its formation, Freedom and Accord won the December 1911 by-elections conducted in Constantinople by one vote. The ruling CUP, seeing the potential of Freedom and Accord to win next year's general elections, took several precautions. Hoping to thwart the nascent party's efforts to grow its ranks and better organize itself, the CUP asked Sultan Mehmed V to dissolve the Chamber and announced its call for early general elections in January 1912.

These early April 1912 general elections were known infamously as the "Election of Clubs" (Turkish: Sopalı Seçimler) after the beating of opposition (Freedom and Accord) candidates for the Chamber of Deputies with weapons like clubs and sticks as well being marred by electoral fraud and violence in favor of the CUP. The fraud included early balloting, secret counting and reporting of votes, ballot stuffing, reapportioning electoral districts, and more, although the CUP still enjoyed genuine support outside of the cities. The results of the elections had CUP win 269 of 275 seats in the Chamber, with Freedom and Accord only netting 6 Deputies.

Angered at their loss in the election, the leadership of Freedom and Accord sought extra-legal methods to regain power over the CUP, complaining vocally about electoral fraud. At around this time, a group of military officers, uncomfortable with injustices it perceived within the military, organized itself into an armed organization known as the "Savior Officers" (Turkish: Halâskâr Zâbitân) and made their presence known to the imperial government. The Savior Officers, quickly becoming partisans of Freedom and Accord, soon created unrest in the capital Constantinople. After gaining the support of Prince Sabahaddin, another opposition leader, the Savior Officers published public declarations in newspapers.

Finally, after giving a memorandum to the Military Council, the Savior Officers succeeded in getting Grand Vizier Mehmed Said Pasha (who they blamed for allowing the early elections that led to the CUP domination of the Chamber) and his government of CUP ministers to resign in July 1912.

=== Great Cabinet ===
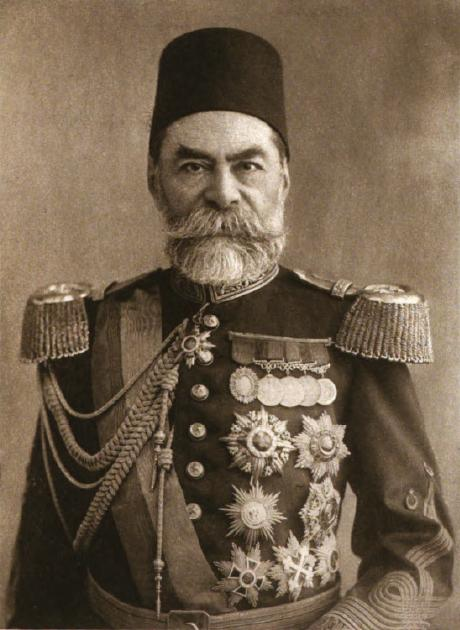
The Grand Vizier and leader of the three-month "Great Cabinet", Ahmed Muhtar Pasha

After Mehmed Said Pasha's resignation, a new, non-partisan cabinet was formed by Ahmed Muhtar Pasha, an old military hero, which was known as the "Great Cabinet" (Turkish: Büyuk Kabine) because it included three former Grand Viziers as ministers and sometimes as the "Father-Son Cabinet" (Turkish: Baba-Oğul Kabinesi) because it included Ahmed Muhtar Pasha's son, Mahmud Muhtar Pasha, as Minister of the Navy. Although the Savior Officers had succeeded in making sure that the Great Cabinet was free of CUP members, the CUP's domination of the Chamber of Deputies had not changed. Soon, however, rumors began to circulate that the government would dissolve the Chamber of Deputies and call new elections. The rumors were confirmed when, a few days after Ahmed Muhtar Pasha took office, the Savior Officers sent another memorandum, this time to the President of the Chamber of Deputies (and CUP member), Halil Bey, demanding that the Chamber be dissolved for new elections within 48 hours. The CUP members in the Chamber condemned and censured this threat. However, thanks to a law he had passed through the Senate, Ahmed Muhtar Pasha was able, with the sultan's support, to dissolve the Chamber with ease on 5 August, after which Sultan Mehmed V immediately called for new elections by imperial decree.

While preparations for new elections were underway, however, the First Balkan War erupted early in October 1912, catching Ahmed Muhtar Pasha's administration off-guard. Martial law was declared, the new elections were cancelled on 25 October, and Ahmed Muhtar Pasha resigned as Grand Vizier on 29 October after just three months in the premier's office in order to defer to the premiership of Kâmil Pasha, who had good relations with the British and was expected to produce a favorable settlement to the disastrous war.

=== Government of Kâmil Pasha and lead-up to the coup ===
Although the foreign crisis in the Balkans put a temporary halt to domestic politics, it did not stop them. Unlike his predecessor Ahmed Muhtar Pasha, who had been non-partisan, Kâmil Pasha was an ardent anti-Unionist and was determined to use his premiership to destroy the CUP. After 1 January 1913 when the party came under the control of Gümülcineli İsmail, he saw both the CUP and Freedom and Accord as dangerous revolutionary committees.

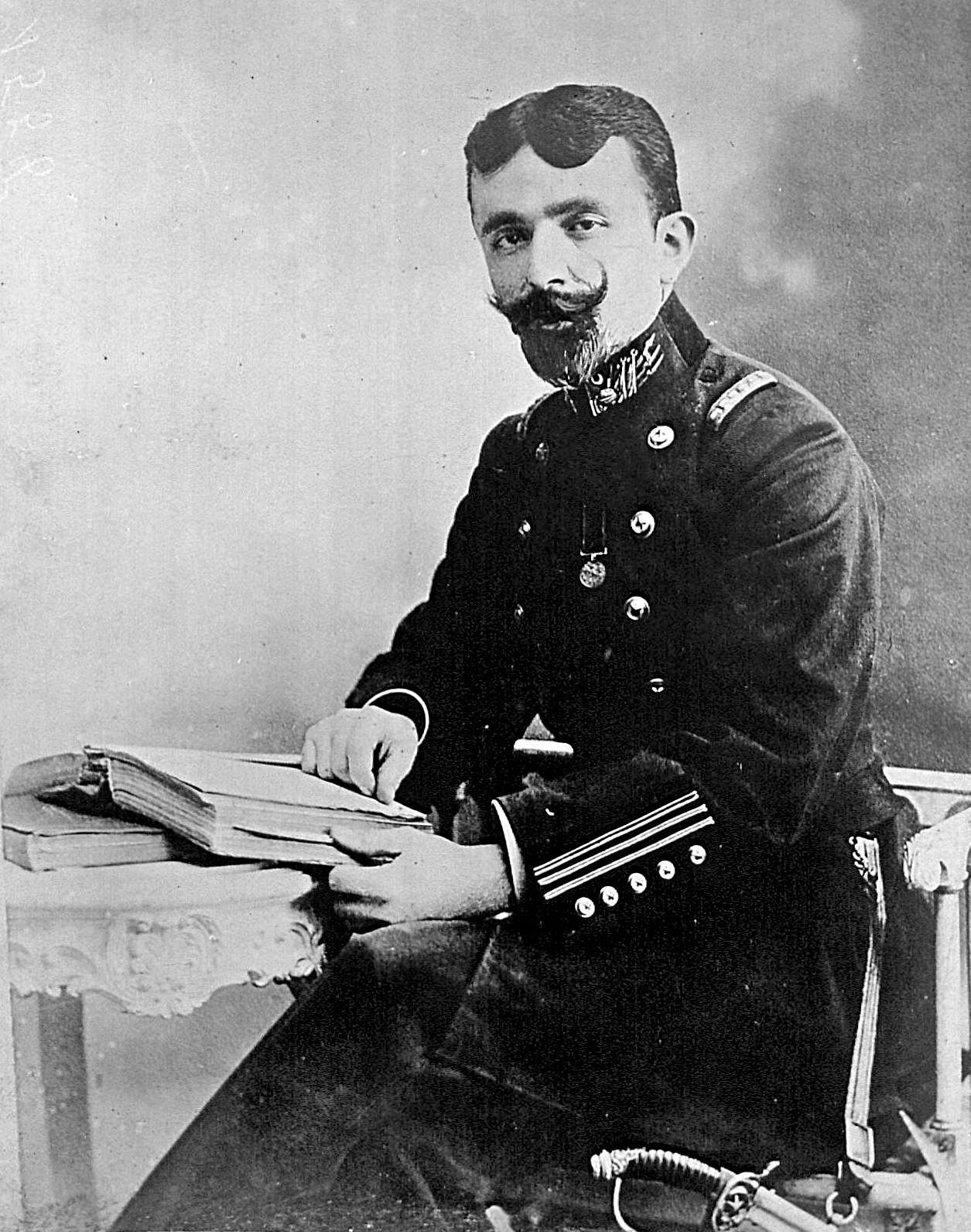
Prior to World War I, Enver Pasha was hailed at home as the hero of the revolution.

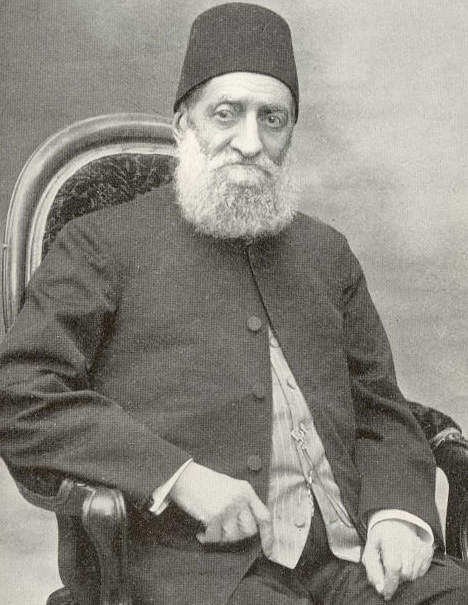
The anti-CUP Grand Vizier Kâmil Pasha, who led the government until his forced resignation in the coup

Using his friendly relations with the British, Kâmil Pasha also sat down to end the ongoing First Balkan War diplomatically. However, the heavy Ottoman military defeats during the war continued to sap morale, as rumors that the capital would have to be moved from Constantinople to inland Anatolia spread. The Bulgarian Army had soon advanced as far as Çatalca, a western district of modern Istanbul. At this point, Kâmil Pasha's government signed an armistice with Bulgaria in December 1912 and sat down to draw up a treaty for the end of the war at the London Peace Conference.

The Great Powers–the British Empire, France, Italy, and Russia–had begun to engage in the relationship of Bulgaria with the Ottoman Empire, citing the 1878 Treaty of Berlin. The Great Powers gave a note to the Sublime Porte (the Ottoman government) that they wanted the Ottoman Empire to cede Adrianople (Edirne) to Bulgaria and the Aegean islands under its control, most of which by that time had been captured by the Greek Navy, to the Great Powers themselves. Because of the losses experienced by the army so far in the war, the Kâmil Pasha government was inclined to accept the "Midye-Enez Line" as a border to the west and, while not outright giving Edirne to Bulgaria, favored transferring control of it to an international commission.

After the capture of Salonica (Thessaloniki), the birthplace of many progressive political leaders and movements of the era, by Greece in November 1912, many CUP members were arrested by Greek forces and exiled to Anatolia. At the same time, Freedom and Accord found itself on the brink of dissolution after intra-party conflicts.

Left with little political power and flexibility, the CUP began to plan a coup against Kâmil Pasha's government. In addition, an animosity had already been brewing between Kâmil Pasha and the CUP since the 1908 Young Turk Revolution that had started the Second Constitutional Era. During the more than four years since, Kâmil Pasha had made a series of efforts to keep CUP members far from government and keep the army, which had many CUP members among its ranks, out of politics. By January 1913, the CUP was thoroughly frustrated with Kâmil Pasha. Although the coup was to be a surprise attack, the CUP had made definitive decisions to carry it out far in advance.

Although he was killed during the coup, both the CUP and Freedom and Accord claimed that they had been planning to give Minister of the Navy Nazım Pasha a position in their next cabinet. The CUP's Talaat Bey went as far as to say some time after the coup that the CUP had previously offered Nazım Pasha the position of grand vizier and the leadership its cabinet.

== Events ==
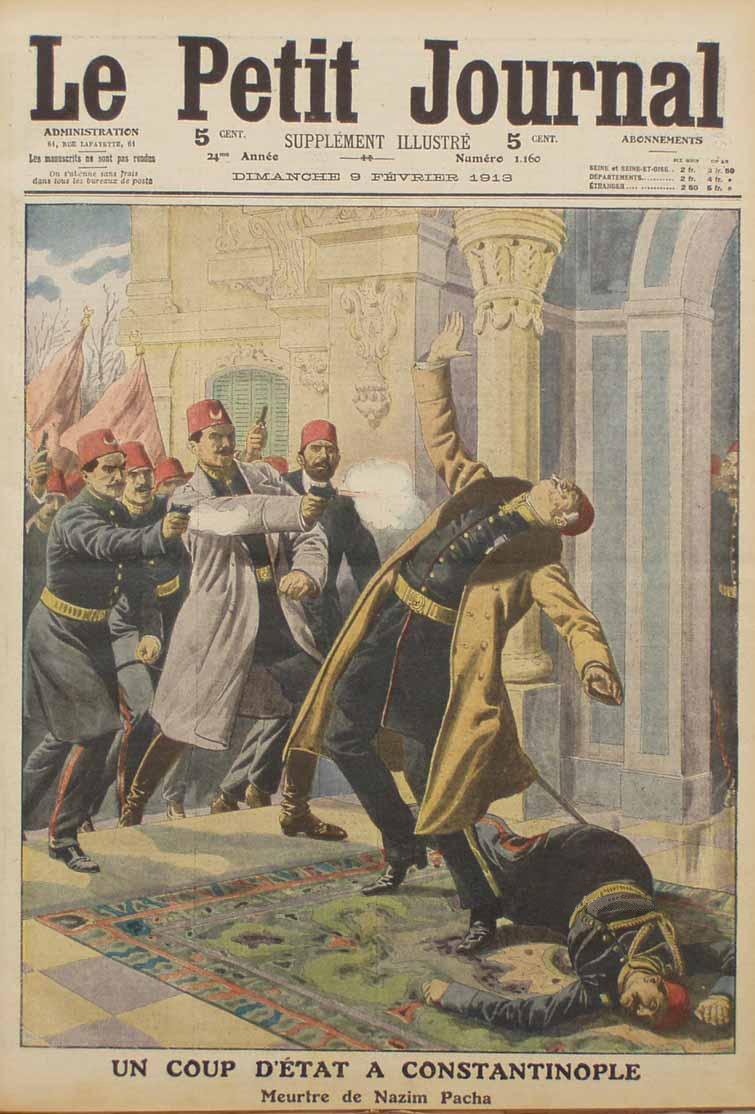
The front page of the Le Petit Journal magazine in February 1913 depicting the assassination of Minister of War Nazım Pasha during the coup

=== March towards the Sublime Porte ===
On 23 January 1913, at 14:30, Lieutenant Colonel Enver Bey (later and better known as Enver Pasha), one of the top leaders of the Committee of Union and Progress, was notified by a CUP member named Sapancalı Hakkı that everything was prepared for the raid as he waited in the military supply-station inspectorate (Turkish: menzil müfettişliği) building near the Nuruosmaniye Mosque. After receiving this news, Enver Bey mounted a white horse waiting for him and began to ride the several blocks from Nuruosmaniye towards the Sublime Porte, which was a metonym referring to a group of government buildings that housed the offices of the Grand Vizier, his imperial government, and other state offices. At this time, Talaat Bey (later known as Talaat Pasha) also began to make his way towards the Sublime Porte with a group of CUP loyalists.

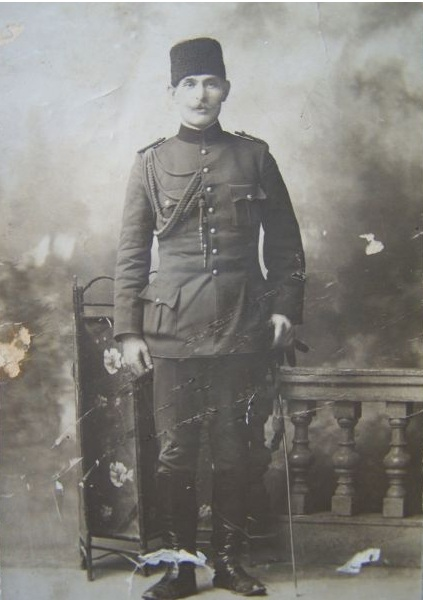
Ömer Naci (1878–1916)

When Enver Bey arrived in front of the Ministry of Public Works (Turkish: Nafıa Nazırlığı) building, fellow CUP members Ömer Naci and Ömer Seyfettin were already provoking a crowd that had gathered by loudly proclaiming that Kâmil Pasha was about to cede Adrianople to the Bulgarians. The speeches made by Ömer Naci and Ömer Seyfettin were effective, and the front of the Sublime Porte was soon filled with a crowd shouting slogans against Kâmil Pasha's government. Moreover, up to 60 CUP members were placed around the Sublime Porte's buildings.

=== Entering the Sublime Porte ===
Enver Bey, along with confederates Talaat Bey, Sapancalı Hakkı, Yakub Cemil, Mustafa Necip, and about 50 others, entered the Sublime Porte compound of government buildings and made their way into the Grand Vizier's building, in which Kâmil Pasha and his cabinet were in session. An aide-de-camp to the Grand Vizier, Ohrili Nâfiz Bey, heard the commotion and opened fire on the raid party but was unable to hit any of them. Himself wounded in the exchange, Ohrili Nâfiz Bey hid in the aide-de-camp office; when Mustafa Necip entered the office, Ohrili Nâfiz Bey shot and killed him but died himself of his wounds sustained from Mustafa Necip.

An aid-de-camp and nephew of Nazım Pasha, Kıbrıslı Tevfik Bey, had also drawn his revolver and fired at the raid party, his bullet also striking Mustafa Necip. After the raiders returned fire, Kıbrıslı Tevfik Bey was instantly killed. During the shooting, a secret police agent and an attendant of the Sheikh ul-Islam were also killed.

=== Shooting of Nazım Pasha ===
Hearing the gunshots, Minister of War Nazım Pasha stepped out of his room and rushed towards the raid party. According to the memoirs of future Turkish president and prime minister Celâl Bayar, Nazım Pasha angrily shouted at the men, "What is going on? You came to raid the grand vizier's office?", using "ill-mannered" profanities in his rage, after which Enver Bey saluted him and tried to explain his intentions. At this time Yakub Cemil, approaching Nazım Pasha from the back while he was engaged with Enver Bey and the rest of the coup party, fired his gun at Nazım Pasha's right temple, killing him.

Another account claimed that Enver Bey had tried to stop Yakup Cemil from killing Nazım Pasha, but Yakup Cemil had refused to listen. Yet another version of events held that either Enver Bey or Talaat Bey had accidentally killed Nazım Pasha while trying to protect themselves from gunfire from his aid-de-camp Kıbrıslı Tevfik Bey.

In any case, the CUP termed Nazım Pasha's death during the coup a "regrettable accident", saying that it was unpremeditated but "unavoidable" under the circumstances. The CUP said that the fact Interior Minister Ahmet Reşit had been allowed to go unhurt proved that the coup leaders had desired to avoid bloodshed, since Ahmet Reşit was much more hostile towards the CUP than Nazım Pasha was. Because the CUP had favored Nazım Pasha and had claimed to offer him a role as grand vizier for a future CUP cabinet before they undertook the coup, the contemporary French magazine L'Illustration said that his "strange fate was being persecuted by the former regime [of Kâmil Pasha and then being included in its cabinet], and being cheered and treated in triumph by the new regime [of the CUP] and then being murdered by it."

=== Forced resignation of Kâmil Pasha ===
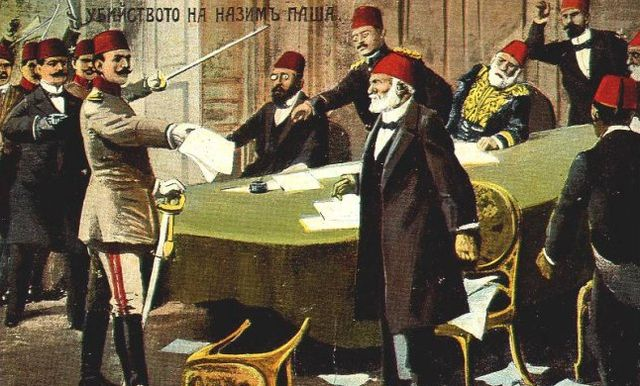
Enver Bey asking Kâmil Pasha to resign during the raid on the Sublime Porte

After this, Enver and Talaat Bey entered Grand Vizier Kâmil Pasha's room and forced him to write a letter of resignation at gunpoint. The letter addressed to the sultan read:

His Peaceful and Sublime Excellency,

Ahali ve cihet-i askeriyeden vuku bulan teklif üzerine huzur-ı şahanelerine istifanâme-i acizanemin arzına mecbur olduğum muhat-i ilm-i âlî buyuruldukta ol babda ve katibe-i ahvalde emr-ü ferman hazret-i veliyyü'l-emr efendimizindir

Upon the request from the people and the military, I have been obliged to submit my humble letter of resignation to your majestic presence, and I have been informed that the command and decree in this regard and in the matter of the situation belongs to our holy lord, the guardian of commands.

— Grand Vizier Kâmil, 23 January 1913

After Kâmil Pasha finished writing, Enver Bey immediately left the Sublime Porte to deliver the letter to Sultan Mehmed V in his palace, driving to the palace in the Sheikh ul-Islam's (Şeyhülislam) car.

== Aftermath ==
=== Immediate effects ===
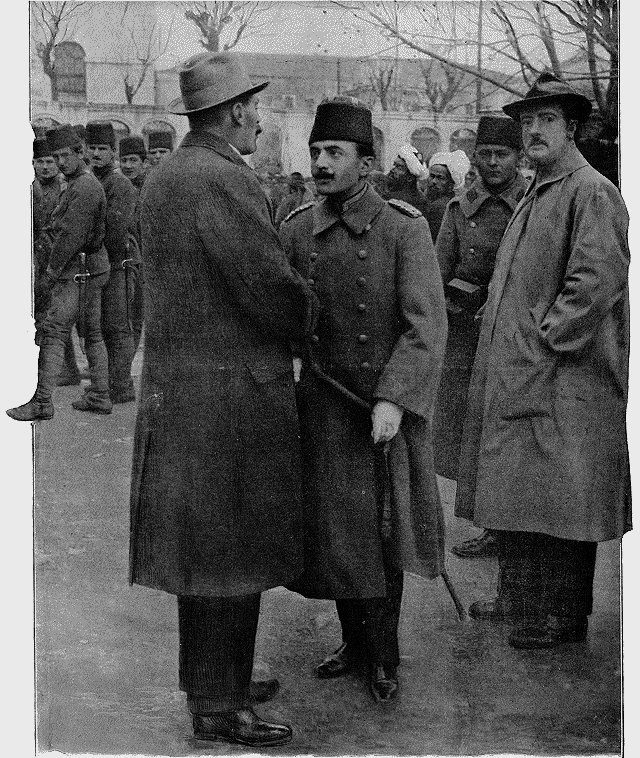
Enver Bey (center) speaking to a correspondent for the French magazine L'Illustration and the British attaché in Constantinople (Istanbul) immediately after seizing power in the coup

After the coup, Enver Bey told a local Turkish correspondent for the French magazine L'Illustration (pictured on right):

I sincerely regret having been forced to intervene again to overthrow a government, but it was impossible to wait; a delay of a few hours, and the country would have been shamefully delivered to the enemy; our army has never been stronger, and I really see no reason that compels us to capitulate to such monstrous demands.

Kâmil Pasha was replaced as Grand Vizier and Nazım Pasha as Minister of War by Mahmud Shevket Pasha, who took both posts. The new cabinet under Mahmud Shevket Pasha was made up of:

- Said Halim Pasha as President of the Council of State (for 3 days)
- Hacı Adil (Arda) as Minister of the Interior
- Çürüksulu Mahmud Pasha as Minister of the Navy
- Nicolae Constantin Batzaria as Minister of Public Works
- Muhtar Bey as acting Minister of Foreign Affairs (for 3 days)
  - Said Halim Pasha succeeding him
- Pirizade Ibrahim Hayrullah Bey as Minister of Justice
- Ürgüplü Mustafa Hayri Efendi as Minister of Pious Foundations
- Mehmed Celal Bey as Minister of Agriculture
- Ahmet Şükrü Bey as Minister of Education
- Oskan Mandikyan as Minister of Posts, Telegraph and Telephone

Although the CUP appointed Grand Vizier Mahmud Shevket Pasha to lead their cabinet, he was genial towards the opposition Freedom and Accord Party. When one of Nazım Pasha's relatives assassinated him in revenge in June 1913, the CUP used the opportunity to crack down on the opposition. Twelve men held responsible by the CUP for Mahmud Shevket Pasha's death, including Nazım Pasha's relative, were convicted for murder and hanged. The opposition parties, already sidelined by the coup, were heavily repressed by the CUP. The leaders of the Savior Officers (Turkish: Halâskâr Zâbitân) escaped to Egypt and Albania. Another opposition leader Prince Sabahaddin, who had backed the Savior Officers against the CUP, fled to western Switzerland, where he would remain until 1919. Freedom and Accord partisans would attempt several plots against the Unionist government until the outbreak of World War I. The party would regain some semblance of power in the Armistice Era after World War I, though again fell into infighting under Colonel Sadık's chairmanship.

=== Long-term legacy ===
The coup essentially led to the establishment of a dictatorial triumvirate known as the "Three Pashas": the soon-to-be war minister, Enver Pasha, the soon-to-be interior minister, Talaat Pasha, and the soon-to-be naval minister, Cemal Pasha. The Three Pashas, leading the CUP autocratically, would control the Empire until fleeing the country at the end of World War I. The coup is considered one of the first violent coups d'état to take place in modern Turkish history, seen as some as establishing a precedent for future coups in the Republic of Turkey.

After the coup, the CUP became increasingly nationalist and intolerant of opposition after seeing significant resistance from more liberal Ottoman parties like Freedom and Accord, as well as rebellions and wars against the Ottoman government from non-Muslim nationalities in the Empire, such as the catastrophic Balkan Wars, which saw former Ottoman citizens of Bulgarian, Greek, Macedonian, and Armenian ethnicity actively fighting against the Empire and committing widespread ethnic cleansing against Ottoman Muslims. Though initially opposed in principle to the extension of local autonomy to the provinces, the CUP now seemed inclined to reconcile with those in favor of greater extension of the millet system to enable Ottoman Muslim unity.

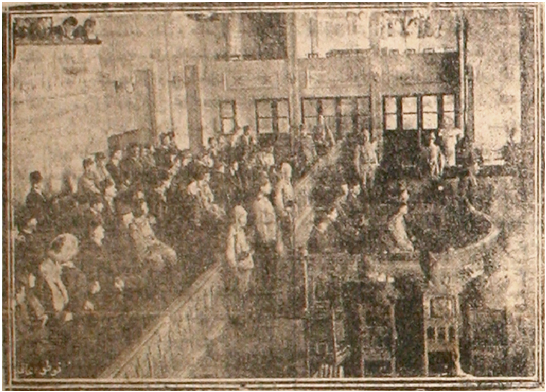
A court session of the Turkish courts-martial of 1919–20. CUP's leaders, Enver, Cemal, Talaat, and others, were ultimately sentenced to death under charges of wartime profiteering and mistreatment of Armenians.

The CUP government introduced several political and military reforms to the empire, including increasing centralization and carrying out military modernization efforts. Under coup leader Enver Bey (later Pasha), the Ottoman Empire moved towards a closer relationship with the German Empire, officially leading to the German–Ottoman alliance being ratified the next year in 1914. Enver would enter the empire into World War I that same year as part of the Central Powers, on the side of Germany, in contrast to the overthrown Kâmil Pasha, who was partial towards the British.

Although the CUP had worked with the Armenians to reinstall constitutional monarchy against Abdul Hamid II, factions in the CUP began to view the Armenians as a fifth column that would betray the Ottoman cause after World War I with nearby Russia broke out; these factions gained more power after the 1913 Ottoman coup d'état. The first major offensive the Turks undertook in World War I was an unsuccessful attempt to drive the Russians from the portion of Western Armenia they had taken in the Russo-Turkish War of 1877. After the failure of this expedition, the CUP's leaders, Enver, Cemal, and Talaat, were involved in ordering the deportations and massacres of 1 and 1.5 million Armenians in 1915–1916 in what became known as the Armenian genocide. After World War I and the signing of the armistice of Mudros, the leadership of the Committee of Union and Progress and selected former officials were court-martialled with/including the charges of subversion of the constitution, wartime profiteering, and the massacres of both Armenians and Greeks. The court reached a verdict which sentenced the organizers of the massacres, Talat, Enver, Cemal and others to death.

== Question of popularity ==
The public support for the coup was questioned at the time by analysts, some of whom reported that the CUP was backed by only a small crowd of actual citizens who had been gathered only within the hour by provocative speeches made by CUP members. Eyewitnesses and newspapers reported very little actual popular participation in the coup or the events surrounding it. Reporter Georges Rémond said:

This revolution is profoundly popular? I doubt it, and the lean applause of the crowd at the inauguration of the [new] Grand Vizier [Mahmud Shevket Pasha] and the Sheik ul-Islam [after the coup] has done nothing to soothe my uncertainty. Everything was done and carried out by a skilled politician, Talaat Bey, who masterminded the coup, and the energetic soldier, Enver, aided by some officers of unfailing dedication and some dozens of patriots who were joined gradually few hundred protesters.

Rémond said that preventing the minimalist coup would have taken at most 50 guards, and that the only reason that the Sublime Porte had been defenseless was because Kâmil Pasha wanted to call the bluff of any real threat the CUP, which he had sidelined politically, posed to his government. After the coup, Rémond said, he found the capital Constantinople to be quiet and devoid of public opinion, whether about the coup or the ongoing First Balkan War, noting an air of "indifference" among not only the populace, but the statesmen involved themselves.
