= Lütfi Fikri Bey =

Turkish politician (1872–1934)

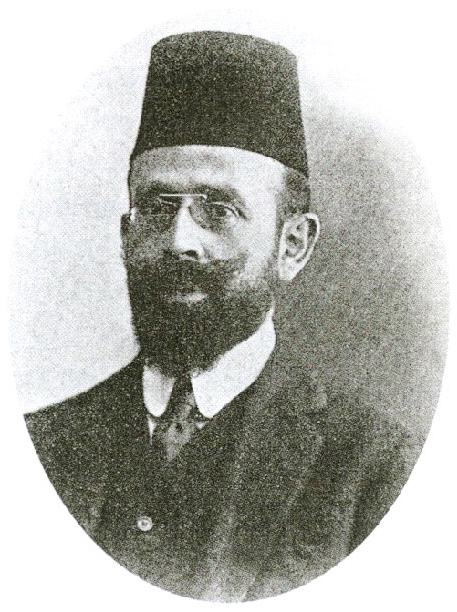

Member of the Grand National Assembly

Personal details
- Born: 1872 Selanik, Ottoman Empire
- Died: 1934 (aged 61–62) Istanbul, Turkey

Lütfi Fikri Bey (1872 – 1934) was an Ottoman liberal politician and jurist, who was a member of the Liberal Union. He was a strong critic of the Committee of Union and Progress.
