= Refi Cevat Ulunay =

Syrian-Turkish writer, journalist and novelist (1890–1968)

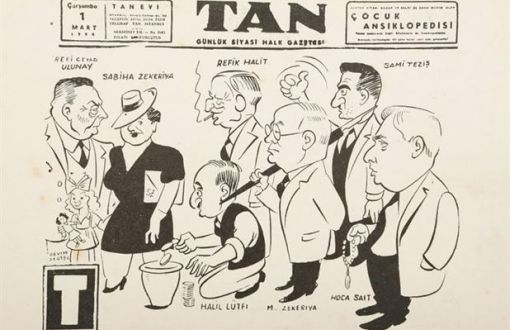
Refi Cevat Ulunay (leftmost), Tan newspaper staff, March 1, 1945

Refi Cevat Ulunay (Damascas, Syria: 1890–1968) was a Syrian-Turkish writer, and a controversial journalist and novelist during the Ottoman era.

== Early life and career ==
Ulunay was born in Ottoman Damascus in 1890. He began writing for numerous Ottoman newspapers on topics such as literature, culture, philosophy and the arts. He strongly criticized the Union and Progress Party between the years 1914 and 1918, and his writings opposing the Turkish Independence War lead to his exile until 1938. He once wrote hopefully and excitedly that "Greece will soon crush the bandits called Mustafa Kemal's forces".

Upon arriving in the Republic of Turkey, Ulunay was a columnist for the Turkish newspaper "Milliyet". He also wrote several books; the themes of love and sexuality are particularly dominant in "Köle" (1945) and "Eski İstanbul Yosmaları" (1959).
