= 1908 Ottoman general election =

1908 Ottoman general elections
- November–December 1908

275 seats in the Chamber of Deputies
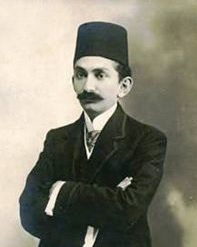
| | Majority party | Minority party |
|---|---|---|
| | CUP |
| Leader | Collective leadership | Prince Sabahaddin |
| Party | Committee of Union and Progress | Liberty Party |
| Seats after | 274 | 1 |

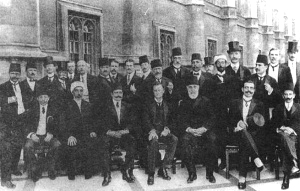
Ottoman MPs visiting London after the declaration of the Second Constitutional Era. In the center Talât Bey, Lord Edward Grey and Ahmet Tevfik Pasha

General elections were held in November and December 1908 for all 275 seats of the Chamber of Deputies of the Ottoman Empire, following the Young Turk Revolution which established the Second Constitutional Era. They were the first elections contested by organised political parties in the Ottoman Empire.

== Background ==
The Young Turk Revolution in July resulted in the restoration of the 1876 constitution, ushering in the Second Constitutional Era, and the reconvening of the 1878 parliament, bringing back many of the surviving members of that parliament; the restored parliament's sole legislation was a decree to formally dissolve itself and call for new elections.

The Committee of Union and Progress (CUP), the driving force behind the revolution, was in an advantageous position for the election. Because it was still a secret organization, the CUP did not organize itself into a proper political party until well after the elections in its 1909 Congress at Selanik. The CUP and the Armenian Dashnak Committee ran in an electoral alliance.

In the lead up to the election, Mehmed Sabahaddin's League for Private Initiative and Decentralization established itself as the Liberty Party. The Liberty Party was liberal in outlook, bearing a strong British imprint and was closer to the Palace. It hardly had time to organize itself for the election. Under pressure from the CUP, the government arrested key supporters of Sabahaddin's as they attempted to campaign in Anatolia, and even presented death threats.

== Electoral system ==
The elections were held in two stages. In the first stage, voters elected secondary electors (one for the first 750 voters in a constituency, then one for every additional 500 voters). In the second stage the secondary electors elected the members of the Chamber of Deputies. The CUP was successful in abolishing quotas for non-Muslim populations, by amending the electoral to instead stipulate one deputy to every 50,000 males.

== Results ==
The Committee of Union and Progress, the main driving force behind the revolution, won every seat in parliament except for one. However, its parliamentary group very quickly whittled itself down to a core group of 60 deputies, gaining the upper hand against the Liberty Party. Many independents were elected to the parliament, mostly from the Arab provinces. The new parliament consisted of 147 Turks, 60 Arabs, 27 Albanians, 26 Greeks, 14 Armenians, 10 Slavs, and four Jews.

Ethnic composition of the 1908 Ottoman parliament
Turks: 147 seats
Arabs: 60 seats
Albanians: 27 seats
Greeks: 26 seats
Armenians: 14 seats
Slavs: 10 seats
Jews: 4 seats

Map of ethnicities of Ottoman MPs
Turks
Arabs
Albanians
Greeks
Armenians
Serbs
Jews
Bulgarians

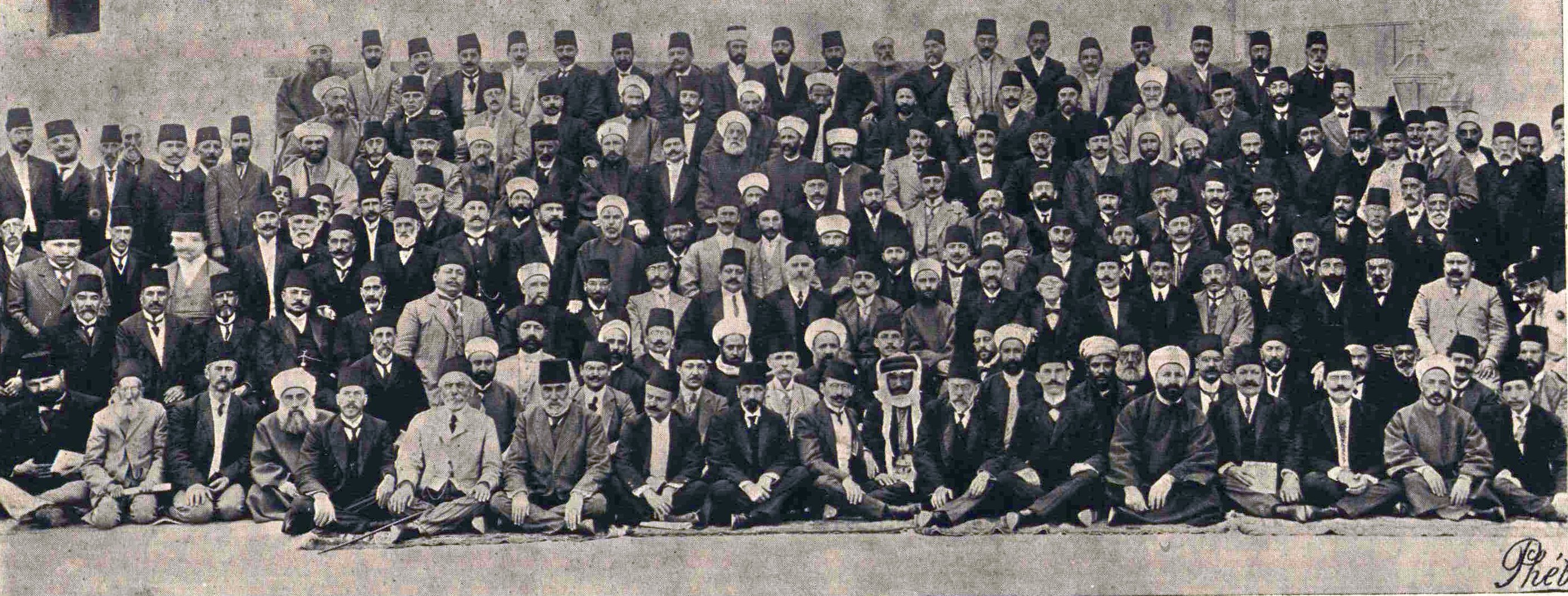
Members of the Chamber of Deputies (1910), Servet-i Fünun

== Aftermath ==
Following the electoral victory, the CUP transformed itself from a clandestine organization to a political party. Before that would happen though, Abdulhamid II (r. 1876–1909) would attempt to regain his autocracy in what would be known as the 31 March incident.

== See also ==
- 3rd Chamber of Deputies of the Ottoman Empire
