= Derviş Vahdeti =

Ottoman religious figure and journalist (1870–1909)

- Born: 1870; Cyprus
- Died: 19 July 1909 (aged 38–39); Constantinople
- Years active: 1900–1909
- Known for: Volkan newspaper; 31 March incident

Derviş Vahdeti (1870 – 19 July 1909) was a Cypriot-born religious figure and Islamist politician. He was the leading figure of 31 March incident. He was executed on 19 July 1909 due to his role in the incident.

== Biography ==
Vahdeti was born in Cyprus in 1870. He was educated at a missionary school where he might first be familiar with the anti-semitic views supported by the British. He worked as a hafiz in Cyprus and joined the Naqshbandi order or the Bektaşi order. In 1902 he settled in Constantinople where he began to work as a public servant. After a while he was exiled to Diyarbakır and soon returned to Constantinople. He attempted to continue to work in his former post, but he was not given the post.

He established a daily newspaper entitled Volkan in 1908 for which he asked for financial support from Sultan Abdulhamid. However, his request was not accepted by the Sultan. He headed an Islamist movement, Muhammadan Union (Ittihad-i Muhammadi in Ottoman Turkish), which was founded by him on 5 April 1908 and was one of the major critics of the Committee of Union and Progress. His paper also acted as the organ of the Muhammadan Union.

On 13 April 1909 a group of religious figured led by Vahdeti started a riot against the constitution and the Committee of Union and Progress, which is known as 31 March incident in reference to the Islamic date of the day, namely 31 March 1325. They demanded the annulment of the constitution, dissolution of the parliament, the expulsion of the Committee of Union and Progress members which were considered to be atheist, and the implementation of the Sharia as the constitution of the Empire. Vahdeti argued that the rule of the Committee of Union and Progress would terminate the Ottoman Empire and damage Islam. He called for military action to realize the group's goals. During the events the editor of Serbestî, Hasan Fehmi, was killed on 6 April. They achieved their goals, and Sultan Abdulhamid endorsed all of these demands of the group which he secretly supported. However, the Committee of Union and Progress regained the power following the suppression of the revolt by the Third Army under the leadership of Mahmud Shevket Pasha, and Derviş Vahdeti was arrested in Constantinople on 18 April. He managed to escape, but he was arrested again on 25 May in İzmir. Vahdeti was sentenced to death for his involvement in the 31 March Incident and was executed in Constantinople on 19 July 1909.

== In popular culture ==
Vahdeti was implied in a story by Refik Halit Karay entitled "Dervish Hasan's Conscience" (Turkish: "Dede Hasan'ın Vicdanı").
