= Hasanbey =

Hasanbey can refer to the following villages in Turkey:

- Hasanbey, Gönen
- Hasanbey, Göynücek
- Hasanbey, Horasan

== See also ==
- Hasanbey Zardabi Natural History Museum
