= Alaettin =

Alaettin is a Turkish name, a variant of Aladdin. Notable people with the name include:

== Given name ==
- Alaettin Çakıcı (born 1954), Turkish crime boss
- Alaettin Ekici (born 2009), Turkish footballer
- Alaettin Tahir (1949–2004), Macedonian author, researcher and journalist

== Places ==
- Alaettin, Gönen, neighbourhood in the municipality and district of Gönen, Türkiye
