= 31 March incident =

1909 political crisis in the Ottoman Empire

31 March Incident
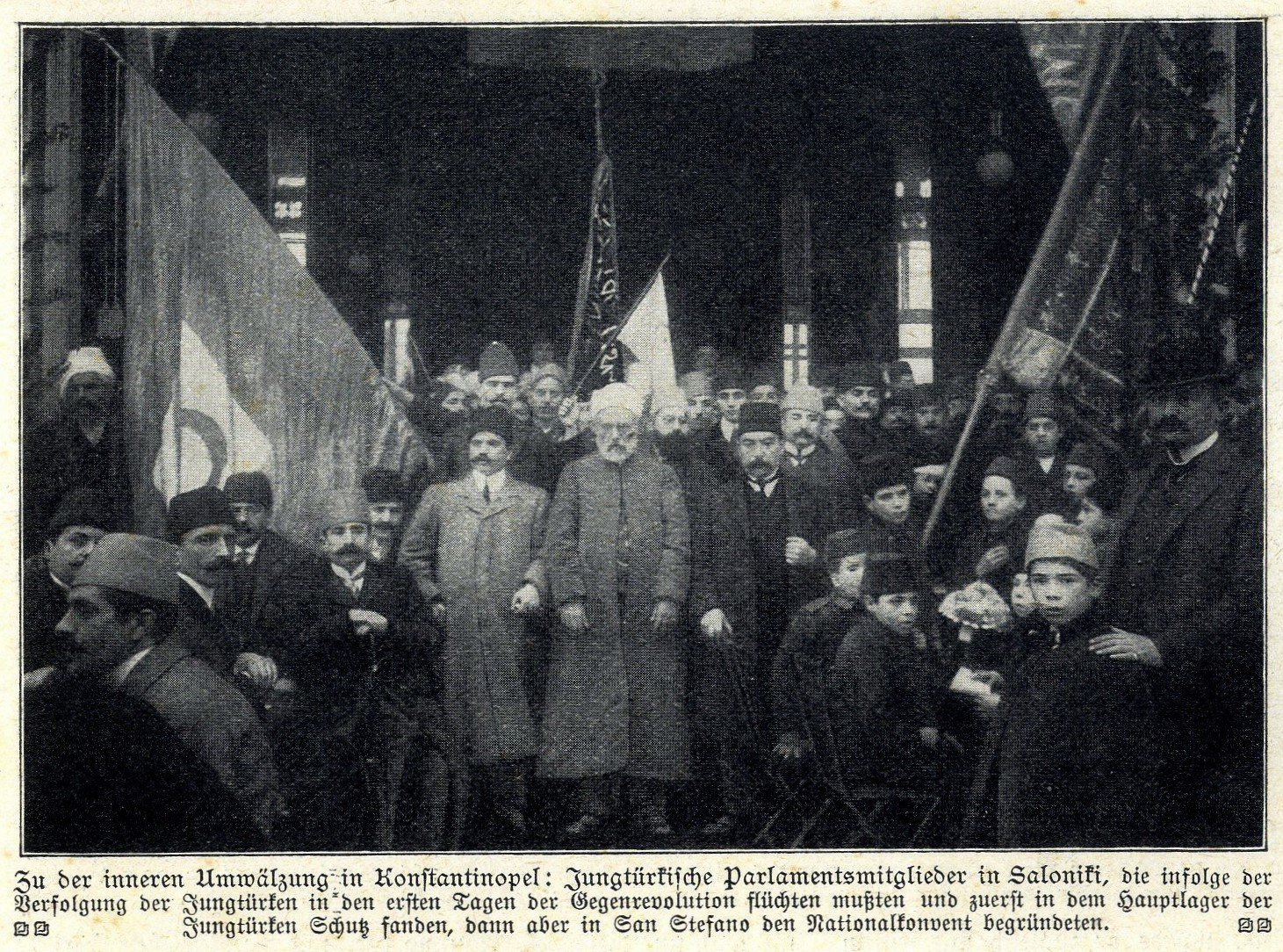
- Deputies of the parliament in Thessaloniki
Date	13 April 1909 (R.C. 31 Mart 1325)
Location	Constantinople, Ottoman Empire
Result	The rebellion was suppressed by the Action Army.: Abdul Hamid II was deposed on 27 April 1909; Execution of Derviş Vahdeti on 19 July 1909

Belligerents
Action Army; Committee of Union and Progress	Hunter battalions revolting against their officers in Istanbul.: The pro-absolutist population joining the rebellion of the military.; Opponents of Union and Progress

Commanders and leaders
Mahmud Şevket Pasha; Hüseyin Hüsnü Pasha; Mustafa Kemal Bey; İsmail Enver Bey; Ahmed Niyazi Bey; Mustafa İsmet Bey	Derviş Vahdeti (executed)

The 31 March incident (Turkish: 31 Mart Vakası) was an uprising in the Ottoman Empire in April 1909, during the Second Constitutional Era. The incident broke out during the night of 30–31 Mart 1325 in Rumi calendar (GC 12–13 April 1909), thus named after 31 March where March is the equivalent to Rumi month Mart. Occurring soon after the 1908 Young Turk Revolution, in which the Committee of Union and Progress (CUP) had successfully restored the Constitution and ended the absolute rule of Sultan Abdul Hamid II (r. 1876–1909), it is sometimes referred to as an attempted countercoup or counterrevolution. It consisted of a general uprising against the CUP within Constantinople, largely led by reactionary groups, particularly Islamists opposed to the secularising influence of the CUP and supporters of absolutism, although liberal opponents of the CUP within the Liberty Party also played a lesser role. Eleven days later the uprising was suppressed and the former government restored when elements of the Ottoman Army sympathetic to the CUP formed an impromptu military force known as the Action Army (Hareket Ordusu). Upon entering Constantinople on 24 April Sultan Abdul Hamid II, accused by the CUP of complicity in the uprising, was deposed and the Ottoman National Assembly elevated his half-brother, Mehmed V, to the throne. Mahmud Shevket Pasha, the military general who had organised and led the Action Army, became the most influential figure in the restored constitutional system until his assassination in 1913.

The precise nature of events is uncertain; differing interpretations have been offered by historians, ranging from a spontaneous revolt of discontents to a secretly planned and coordinated counter-revolution against the CUP. Most modern studies disregard claims the sultan was actively involved in plotting the uprising, emphasising the CUP's mismanagement of troops in the build up to the mutiny and the role of conservative religious groups. The crisis was an important early moment in the empire's process of disintegration, setting a pattern of political instability which continued with military coups in 1912 and 1913. The temporary loss of power led to radicalisation within the CUP, resulting in an increasing willingness among Unionists to utilise violence. Some scholars have argued that the deterioration of ethnic relations and erosion of public institutions during 1908–1909 precipitated the Armenian genocide. The crisis also represented the demise of the Sultanate's power in the Ottoman Empire, as a series of constitutional amendments confined its function in government to the confirmation of parliamentary decisions, conversely cementing parliament's supremacy in a significant step of republicanism in Turkish political history.

== Background ==
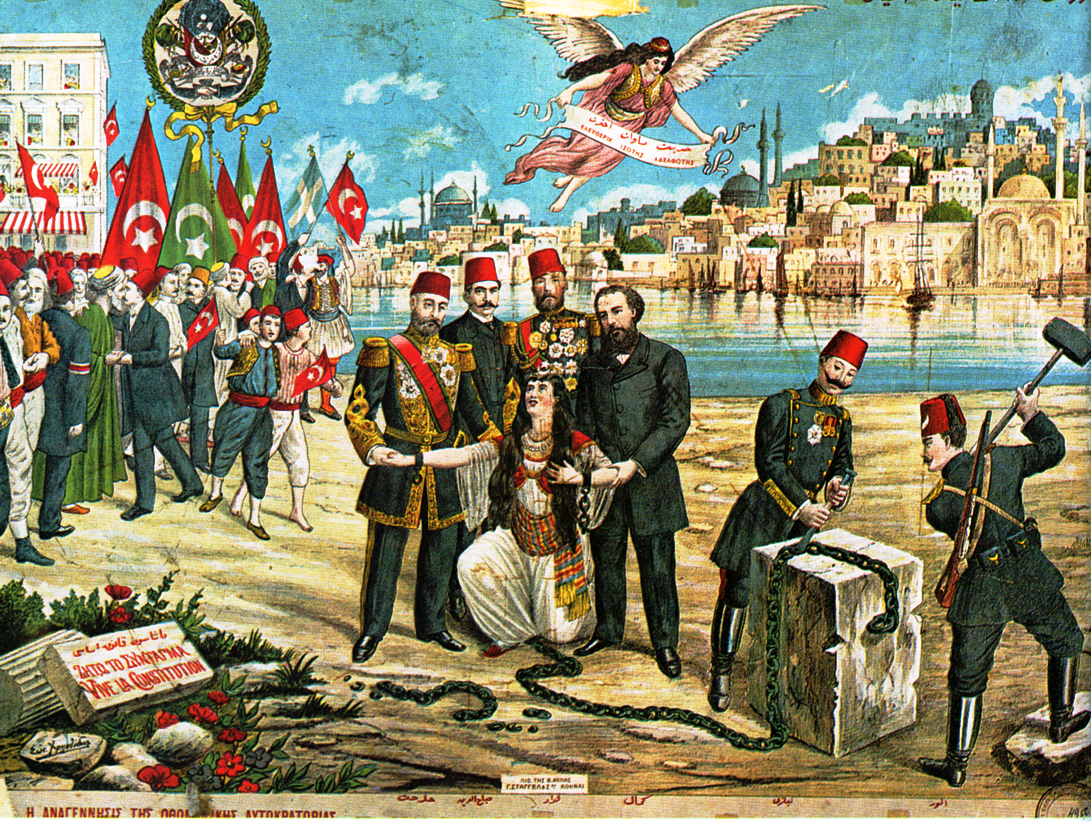
A Greek lithograph celebrating "freedom, equality, brotherhood" among Ottoman subjects following the 1908 revolution

The educational reforms during Abdul Hamid II's reign (1876–1909) had led to an increased diffusion of liberal political thought from Western Europe among young Ottoman professionals and military officers. A loosely organised underground movement of reformists known as the Young Turks emerged to press for the restoration of a constitutional monarchy and political reform. These demands were partly inspired by the Young Ottomans, a secret society of intellectuals which had forced Abdul Hamid to enact a liberal constitution during the brief First Constitutional Era (1876–1878).

In July 1908, a secret revolutionary organisation called the Committee of Union and Progress (CUP) led an insurrection in the empire's Balkan provinces which compelled the sultan to restore the constitution of 1876, in what became known as the Young Turk Revolution. The CUP, internally divided and lacking an agreed political program, did not take over government; instead it chose to influence the unsteady parliamentary regime from a distance and its Central Committee remained based in Salonika. The CUP cautiously undertook to restrict the sultan's powers and by early August 1908 it had overseen the transfer of navy and army ministerial appointments away from the sultan to the office of the grand vizier. The sultan's palace staff were reduced and replaced with CUP members who monitored Abdul Hamid's official correspondence. Meanwhile, the interim government of Kâmil Pasha carried out a series of democratic and administrative reforms, abolishing the secret police and rescinding press censorship powers, permitting free political campaigning ahead of a general election held during November and December. Abdul Hamid opened the new parliamentary session on 17 December.

Throughout 1908, as events continued to unfold in Constantinople, the Ottoman Empire lost large portions of its European territory. This was due to both encroachments by foreign powers and the activity of the empire's ethnic minorities: Austria annexed Bosnia-Herzegovina, Bulgaria declared independence, and Greece seized Crete. These losses dampened the popular elation that had followed the re-establishment of parliament, while open political debate brought existing cleavages to the surface. Muslims saw the new government as impotent in the face of pressure from European powers, while government promises to reclaim the lost territories upset minorities who hoped for greater autonomy or independence. One of the greatest threats came from supporters of Islamism, who agitated against the secular nature of the new constitution and equality for non-Muslims, arguing that the adoption of Western technology did not need to be accompanied by a move away from Islamic law. This view was widely held throughout Ottoman society and Islamists may have enjoyed the private support of Abdul Hamid, despite his proclamations in favour of the new constitution.

== Military revolt ==
=== Prelude ===
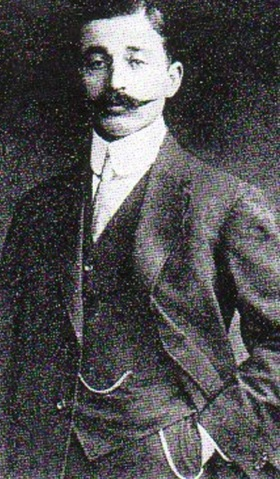
The murder of Hasan Fehmi, editor-in-chief of the anti-CUP newspaper Serbestî, in the days preceding the mutiny acted as a catalyst for unrest.

In October 1908, the Committee of Union and Progress arranged for the transfer of three seasoned sharpshooter (Avcı) battalions of the Third Army Corps from Salonika to Constantinople in response to increased political tension in the city and concerns over the loyalty of its regular garrison, the First Army Corps. The Third Army's mektepli officers – graduates of the prestigious Ottoman Military College trained in modern military techniques – had played an instrumental role in the 1908 revolution. Upon their arrival in Constantinople, the well-connected mektepli officers began to play an important role within the capital's political and social scene, attending CUP political functions, banquets and theatrical performances. With their officers increasingly absent, discipline within the sharpshooter battalions began to break down. A generational divide exacerbated the poor relationship between the officers and their men, as opponents of the CUP within the military expressed unhappiness with entrusting the empire's leadership to "yesterday's school children", the young CUP officers recently graduated from military academies, at the expense of more experienced officers who had climbed the ranks. The situation worsened when the newly elected parliament announced its intention to retire a significant part of the officer corps, with cuts disproportionately affecting non-commissioned officers.

In late October, authorities arranged for the transfer of Albanian troops seen as hostile to the new regime out of Constantinople. Many of these soldiers were soon due to be discharged, and upon receiving orders for deployment to Yemen a portion refused and demonstrated for the immediate termination of their contracts. Troops from the fourth Avcı battalion were sent to suppress the protests by force and a second riot among Albanian troops in March was again put down by Avcı troops, who fired into the riotous crowd of Albanians with machine guns. These events severely damaged morale among the sharpshooters. In February 1909, Grand Vizier Kâmil Pasha moved to weaken the CUP's grip on power by appointing his own candidates as Ministers of War and Navy. In response, the CUP orchestrated a confidence vote against his cabinet, forcing him to resign. On 14 February 1909, the CUP's preferred candidate, Hüseyin Hilmi Pasha, was appointed the new grand vizier. Rumours spread within the city that the CUP would use the Avcı troops to depose Abdul Hamid, or that Kâmil Pasha had attempted to order them back to Macedonia. As a consequence of these machinations, the battalions became increasingly politicised and, to the frustration of ordinary soldiers, seen as a tool of the CUP.

Discontent among the soldiers was further stirred up by Muslim fundamentalists. Islamists in Constantinople were led by a charismatic mystic from Cyprus called Hafiz Derviş Vahdeti, who may have belonged to the Bektashi Order. Vahdeti established the Society for Islamic Unity, also known as the Mohammedan Union Party, and set up a newspaper called Volkan (Volcano in English) in November 1908 to spread anti-secularist rhetoric and campaign against the government. Religious conservatives portrayed the restored 1876 constitution as sacrificing Islamic traditions in order to curry favour with Western states and attacked the new general assembly for giving minorities and Christians within the empire greater influence, issues which resonated with soldiers who had recently been fighting separatists in the Balkans. Attempts by the CUP to introduce new mektepli officers and training regimen into the First Army Corps resulted in less time for soldiers to undertake ablution and prayer, allowing Islamists to present the CUP and its officers as irreligious, even atheistic, free masons from Macedonia. Although Abdul Hamid refused to provide financial support for the movement and newspaper, figures connected with the palace purportedly supported Vahdeti and one of the sultan's sons, Şehzade Mehmed Burhaneddin, was a member of the Mohammedan Union. The society held its first mass rally on 3 April at the Hagia Sophia; its agitation for the restoration of Sharia gained widespread support, including from soldiers stationed in the city.

On 7 April, Hasan Fehmi, a prominent opposition journalist, was shot and killed as he crossed Galata Bridge in Constantinople. The assassination went unsolved but many in the city speculated that the CUP had been responsible. Protests by Islamic conservatives and seminary students over the killings led to unrest among soldiers in the city's main barracks.

=== Mutiny ===
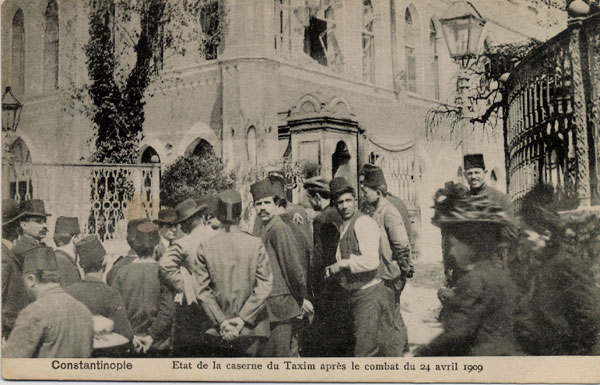
Taşkışla barracks at Taksim following the suppression of the uprising

Early on the morning of 13 April, troops of the fourth Avcı regiment based at the Taşkışla barracks mutinied, locking up their officers and marching onto the streets to call for the reinstatement of Sharia and for the CUP to be disbanded. Religious students joined the mutinying soldiers outside the Sultan Ahmed Mosque, before marching to the parliamentary building. Hilmi Pasha's government was in a state of confusion, and fearful of the repercussions of ordering remaining loyal troops against the protestors, it sent the Chief of Police instead to hear the crowd's requests. Six demands were prepared by the spokesmen of the mutineering soldiers: the return of Sharia law, the banishment of some CUP parliamentarians from Constantinople, the replacement of Ahmed Rıza (the CUP President of the Chamber of Deputies), the replacement of some CUP officers and the removal of the Grand Vizier along with the Ministers of War and Navy. By the afternoon the government's authority in the capital had collapsed, and faced with this ultimatum Hilmi Pasha and his cabinet resigned. The Sultan swiftly appointed Ahmet Tevfik Pasha as grand vizier. During five days of unrest, CUP members were actively hunted in Istanbul. The Armenian Revolutionary Federation (ARF), which also supported the constitutional regime and opposed the reactionary uprising, sheltered several Unionists; Talaat and d Dr Nazim, were among those who took refuge in the homes of politically prominent Armenians.

Marshal Ethem Pasha, the War Minister of the new cabinet went to see the troops at Meydanı, gave them praise and told them that their requests would be fulfilled. The victory was celebrated by the soldiers and religious students. During the revolt, the CUP was targeted in a pogrom with protestors killing 20 people, mainly army officers. Latakia deputy Emir Arslan Bey was lynched for being mistaken for Hüseyin Cahit (Yalçin), the editor of the CUP newspaper Tanin. Justice Minister Nazım Pasha (no relation to the War Minister Nazım Pasha) met a similar fate, for being mistaken for Ahmet Rıza. Protestors also burned a few CUP offices such as those belonging to Tanin and Şura-yı Ümmet.

== Political crisis ==
After the failed countercoup, members of the Committee of Union and Progress (CUP) either went into hiding or fled Constantinople. As a result, the Chamber of Deputies lacked enough members for a parliamentary session. Ismail Kemal, a Liberty Party deputy, managed to gather some parliamentarians and officially announced that the constitution and Sharia law would be preserved, responding to the requests of the troops. Kemal briefly became President of the Ottoman National Assembly and led it to recognize a new government by Abdul Hamid II. He urged his constituency in Vlorë to acknowledge the new government, and Albanians from his hometown supported him, even raiding the arms depot to back the sultan with weapons if needed. Albanian clubs also expressed support for quelling the uprising, while Prenk Bib Doda, leader of the Mirdita, offered assistance from his tribe, driven by fears that the Hamidian regime could return, rather than being loyal to the CUP. During the countercoup, Isa Boletini and several Kosovo Albanian chieftains offered military assistance to the sultan. In response, the Sultan promised to bring back the rule of religion if he were to be reinstated. The situation in Constantinople remained under the control of Dervish Vahdeti for 11 days.

After being driven out of the capital, Mehmed Talaat, an Edirne deputy and CUP leader, escaped with 100 deputies to Ayastefanos (Yeşilköy) and established a counter government, declaring the new government in Constantinople as illegal. Within Constantinople, the leadership of the Liberal Party attempted unsuccessfully to maintain control of events and prevent the rebellion from taking an anti-constitutionalist course in support of Abdul Hamid. Conflicts arose within the Islamic clergy, with higher-ranking ulama united in the Society of the Islamic Scholarly Profession opposing the uprising, while some imams (hocas) supported it. From 16 April onward, the ulama publicly denounced the revolt.

The CUP managed to retain its influence in the provinces, particularly in Macedonia, and took immediate countermeasures. They organized public demonstrations in towns across the provinces and sent numerous telegrams to the palace and parliament, successfully convincing a significant portion of the population in Macedonia that the constitution was in danger. The historian Erik-Jan Zürcher has commented that the CUP was largely successful in its propaganda, and was able to convince a significant portion of the population of Macedonia that the constitution was in peril.

=== Formation of the Action Army ===
From 15 April the CUP began preparations for a military operation against the rebels. It appealed to Mahmud Shevket Pasha, commander of the Ottoman Third Army based in Selanik (modern Thessaloniki) to quell the uprising. With support from the commander of the Ottoman Second Army in Edirne, Mahmud Shevket combined the armies to create a strike force called the "Action Army" (Hareket Ordusu). The force numbered 20,000–25,000 regular troops, reinforced with volunteer units, mostly Albanians led by Major Ahmed Niyazi Bey. The eleventh Reserve (Redif) Division based in Selanik composed the advance guard of the Action Army and the chief of staff was Mustafa Kemal Pasha.

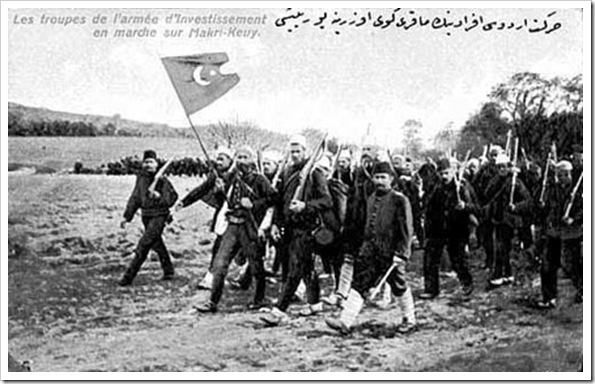
Action Army forces marching on Bakırköy

In short time CUP members Fethi Okyar, Hafız Hakkı and Enver Bey returned from their international posts at Ottoman embassies and joined Mahmud Shevket and his military staff prior to reaching Constantinople. The Action Army's troops were transported by train to Çatalca and Hademköy, and then to Ayastefanos (also referred to as San Stefano; modern Yeşilköy). It was secretly agreed there that Abdul Hamid would be deposed for his brother Reşad. A delegation was sent to Army headquarters by the Ottoman Parliament that sought to stop it from taking Constantinople through force. The response was negative and the delegation then went to Ayastefanos and made a call for colleagues to unite with them. Both parliamentary chambers convened as a "General National Assembly" (Meclis-i Umumî-i Millî) at the Yachting Club building of Ayastefanos on 23 April and thereafter. Qemali had left the city prior to the Action Army arriving at Constantinople and he fled to Greece.

The Sultan remained in the Yildiz and had frequent conferences with Grand Vizier Tevfik Pasha who announced:

His Sublime Majesty awaits benevolently the arrival of the so called constitutional army. He has nothing to gain or fear since his Sublimity is for the Constitution and is its supreme guardian.

Negotiations continued for six days. The negotiators were Rear Admiral Arif Hikmet Pasha, Emanuel Karasu Efendi (Carasso), Esad Pasha Toptani, Aram Efendi and Colonel Galip Bey (Pasiner). Finally, at the moment when the conflict showed signs of extending to the public, the Salonikan troops entered Constantinople.

=== Rebellion suppressed ===
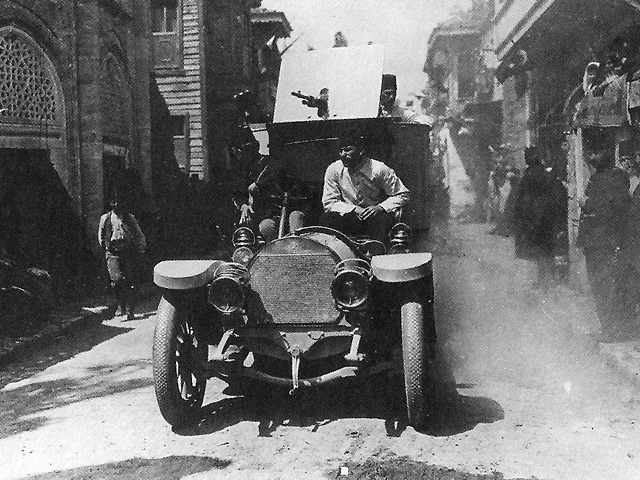
Action Army forces entering Constantinople

Early on the morning of 24 April the Action Army began to occupy Constantinople, with the operation directed by Ali Pasha Kolonja. There was little meaningful resistance, with the exception of Taşkışla and Taksim barracks; by four o'clock of the afternoon the remaining rebels surrendered.

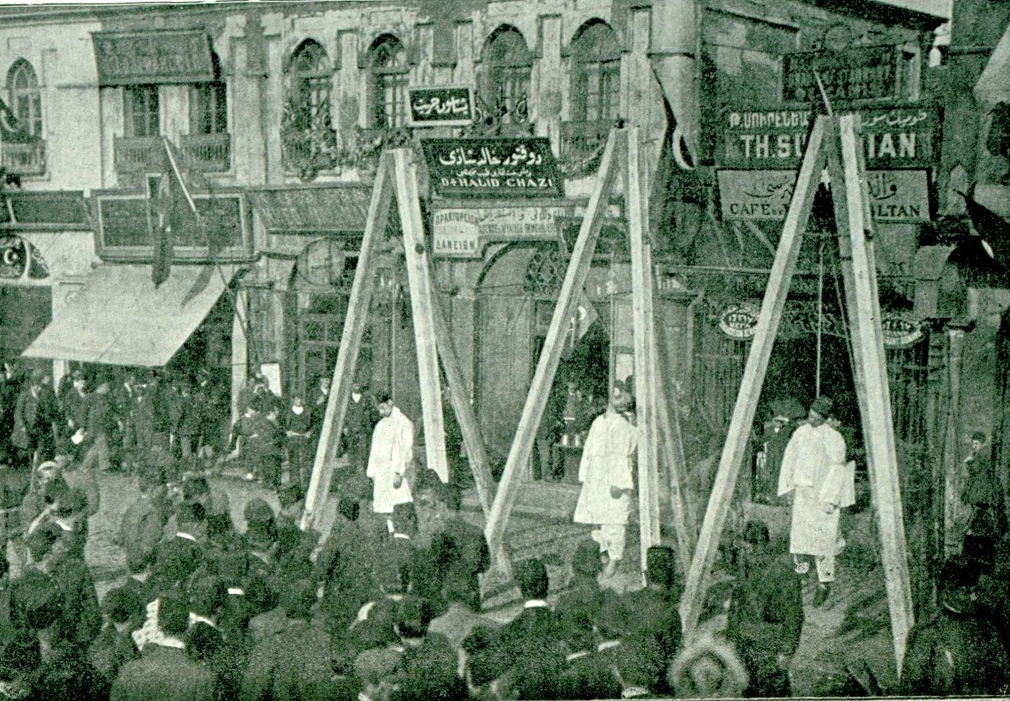
The execution of the countercoup rebels in the journal Resimli Kitap, 1909

There was fierce street fighting in the European quarter where the guard houses were held by the First Army Corps. There was heavy fire from troops in the Taşkışla barracks against the advancing troops. The barracks had to be shelled and almost destroyed by the artillery located on the heights above the barracks before the garrison surrendered after several hours fighting and heavy losses. Equally desperate was the defence of the Taksim barracks. The attack on the Taksim barracks was led by Enver Bey. After a short battle they gained control of the palace on 27 April.

Under martial law and following the defeat of the rebellion two courts martial sentenced and executed the majority of the rebels which included Dervish Vahdeti. Albanians involved in the counterrevolutionary movement were executed such as Halil Bey from Krajë which caused indignation among conservative Muslims of Shkodër. Some Liberal (Ahrar) political leaders were arrested and British pressure resulted in their freedom. A government investigation later cleared Qemali of any wrongdoing. Sultan Abdul Hamid was deserted by most of his advisors. The parliament discussed the question as to whether he would be permitted to remain on the throne or be deposed or even be executed. Putting the Sultan to death was considered unwise as such a step might rouse a fanatical response and plunge the Empire into civil war. On the other hand, there were those who felt that after all that had happened it was impossible that the parliament could ever again work with the Sultan.

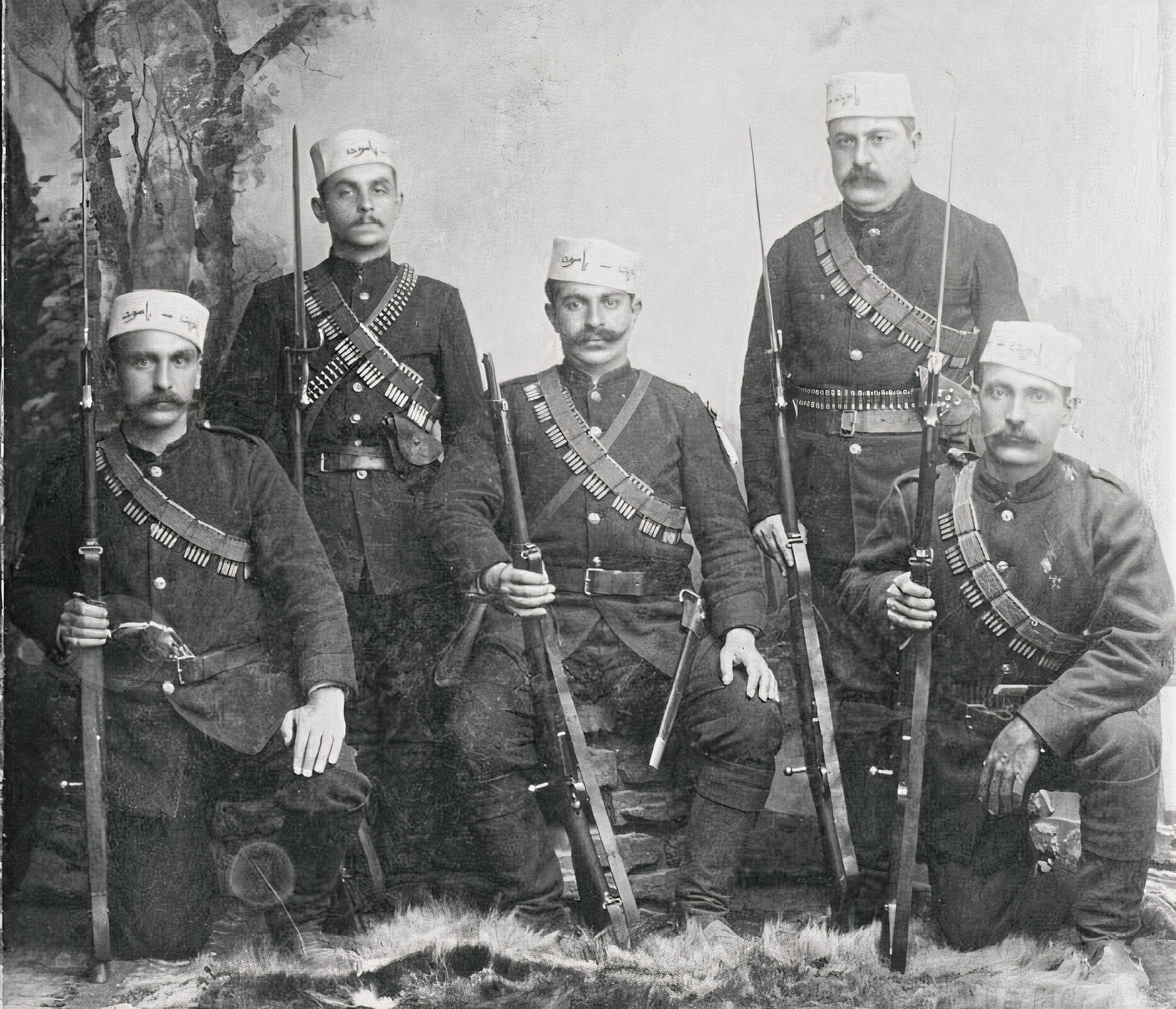
Celâl Bayar (2nd from left), who would later become the 3rd President of Modern Turkey, was among the volunteer troops who took action to suppress the rebellion

On 27 April the Assembly held a meeting behind closed doors under the presidency of Said Pasha. In order to remove the Sultan, a fatwa was needed. So, a fatwa drawn up in the form of question and was given to scholars to answer and sign. A scholar by the name of Nuri Efendi was brought to sign the fatwa. Initially, Nuri Efendi was unsure whether three crimes raised in the question were carried out by Abdul Hamid II. He initially suggested that it would better to ask the Sultan to resign. It was insisted that Nuri Efendi sign the fatwa. However Nuri Efendi continued to refuse. Finally, Mustafa Asim Efendi convinced him and so the fatwa was signed by him and then it was signed by the newly appointed Shaykh al-Islam, Mehmed Ziyâeddin Efendi, legalising it. The fatwa complete with the answer was now read to the assembled members:

If an imam of the Muslims tampers with and burns the sacred books.
If he appropriates public money.
If after killing imprisoning and exiling his subjects unjustly, he swears to amend his ways and then perjures himself.
If he causes civil war and bloodshed among his own people.
If it is shown that his country will gain peace by his removal and if it be considered by those who have power that this imam should abdicate or be deposed.
Is it lawful that one of these alternatives be adopted.
The answer is "Olur" (it is permissible).

Then the Assembly unanimously voted that Sultan Abdul Hamid should be deposed.

== Allegations of foreign support ==
Some writers have accused the British, led by Sir Gerald Fitzmaurice (1865–1939), Chief Dragoman of the British Embassy, of being the hidden hand behind a reactionary religious uprising. The British government had already supported actions against constitutionalists in an attempt to mute the effect of increasing German sympathizers in the Ottoman Empire since the 1880s. According to these sources, this countercoup was directed specifically against the CUP's Salonica (Thessaloniki) branch, which had outmatched the British-sympathizing Monastir (Bitola) Branch.

== Aftermath and legacy ==
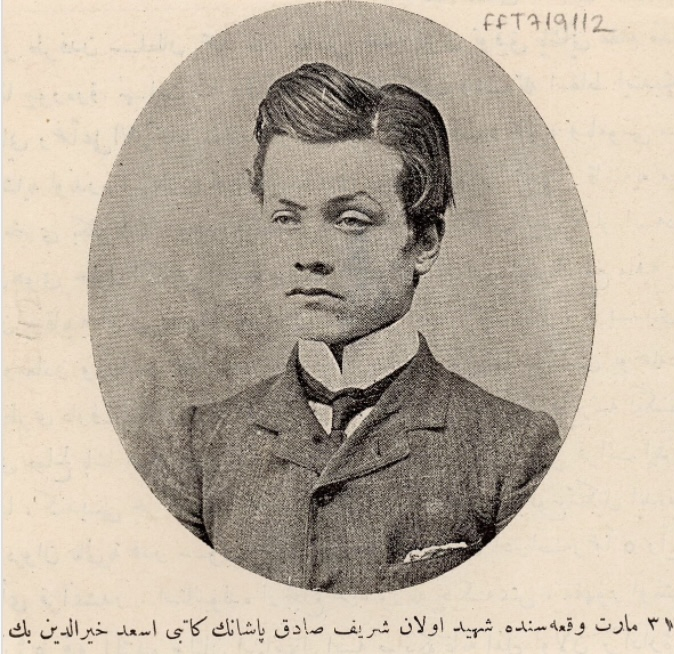
Esad Hayreddin Bey, one of the soldiers killed during the event

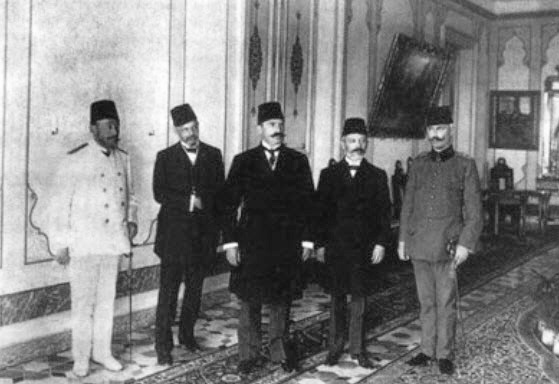
Delegation of the Ottoman Parliament to Sultan Abdul Hamid II. Left to right: Rear Admiral Arif Hikmet Pasha, Emanuel Karasu Efendi, Essad Pasha Toptani, Aram Efendi and Colonel Galip Bey (Pasiner), April 1909.

The failure of the counter-coup allowed the Committee of Union and Progress to regain power and form a new government. As a result of this incident, the position of the Grand Vizier changed, with Ahmet Tevfik Pasha assuming the role. The constitution was restored for the third time (after earlier attempts in 1876 and 1908), and both parliamentary chambers convened to depose Abdul Hamid II. Four CUP members composed of one Armenian, one Jew and two Muslim Albanians went to inform the sultan of his dethronement, with Essad Pasha Toptani being the main messenger saying "the nation has deposed you". Some Muslims expressed dismay that non Muslims had informed the sultan of his deposition. Abdul Hamid was replaced by his younger brother, who took the name Mehmed V. The sultan directed his anger toward Essad Toptani, whom he considered a traitor due to his family's ties to royal patronage, such as his gains in privileges and key positions in the Ottoman government. Albanians involved in the counterrevolutionary movement were executed such as Halil Bey from Krajë which caused indignation among the conservative Muslims of Shkodër.

Following the 31 March Incident, the CUP took measures to suppress the interests of ethnic minorities within Ottoman society. Societies advocating for minority rights, such as the Society of Arab Ottoman Brotherhood, were outlawed, and publications with radical Islamic rhetoric were prohibited.

Under the multi-religious "balancing policies" of the CUP which aimed to achieve "Ottomanisation" by promoting Ottoman nationalism over ethnic or religious nationalism among the Empire's diverse subjects. These measures stirred some nationalist sentiments among non-Turkish populations, contributing to a national identity that resisted conservative Islam.

=== Impact on international relations ===
While Germany was perturbed with the deposition of their ally Abdul Hamid, the CUP eventually proved just as willing to stoke pan-Islamism. With military reforms bearing fruit in the army, German arms dealers reassessed the situation. Through the Turkologist Ernst Jäckh, financing for the Berlin-Baghdad railway resumed, and a large loan was procured for further modernization projects for arms and barracks. Kaiser Wilhelm II ultimately did not mind the fall of his friend Abdul Hamid and the entrenchment of the Young Turks.

=== Memorial ===
The Monument of Liberty (Ottoman Turkish: Abide-i Hürriyet) was erected in 1911 in Şişli district of Constantinople as a memorial to the 74 soldiers killed in action during this event.

== See also ==
- Sir Gerard Lowther, 1st Baronet
