= Hasan Fehmi =

Hasan Fehmi may refer to:

- Hasan Fehmi Pasha (1836–1910), Ottoman statesman
- Hasan Fehmi (journalist) (1874–1909), Ottoman journalist
- Hasan Fehmi Ataç (1879–1961), Turkish MP of Gümüşhane
- Hasan Fehmi Güneş (1934–2021), Turkish politician and minister of interior
