= Dişbudak =

Dişbudak can refer to the following villages in Turkey:

- Dişbudak, Adıyaman
- Dişbudak, Gönen
- Dişbudak, Keşan
- Dişbudak, Lapseki
