= Geyikli (disambiguation) =

Geyikli can refer to:

- Geyikli
- Geyikli, Gönen
- Geyikli, Kastamonu
- Geyikli, Köprüköy
- Geyikli, Kozluk
