= Bayramiç (disambiguation) =

Bayramiç can refer to:

- Bayramiç
- Bayramiç, Gelibolu
- Bayramiç, Gönen
