= Mevlan =

Mevlan is a given name. Notable people with the name include:

- Mevlan Adili (born 1994), Macedonian footballer
- Mevlan Murati (Macedonian: Мевљан Мурати; born 5 March 1994), Macedonian professional footballer
- Nuriye Ulviye Mevlan Civelek (1893–1964), Turkish women's rights advocate
