= Women's World (Ottoman magazine) =

Defunct Turkish women's magazine

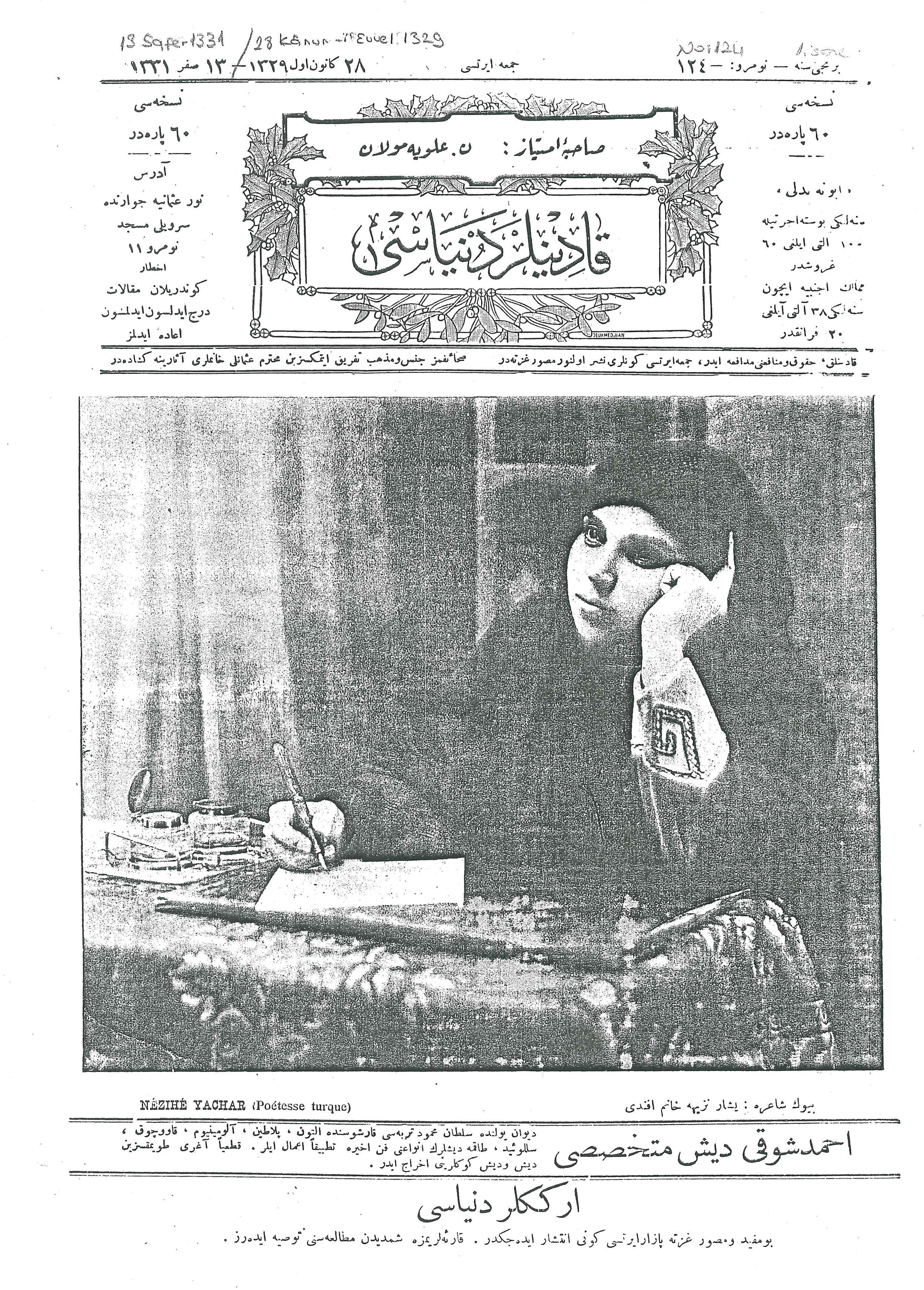
- The writer Yaşar Nezihe on the cover of the 124th issue of the Ottoman feminist magazine Kadınlar Dünyası
- Editor-in-Chief: Emine Seher Hanim (issues 1–108)
- Frequency: Daily (for the first 100 days), then weekly
- Format: 4 pages (issues 1–100); 16 pages with images by time of final publication
- Total circulation: >3,000
- Founder: Nuriye Ulviye Mevlan Civelek
- Founded: 4 April 1913
- Final issue: 21 May 1921
- Country: Turkey

Women's World (Turkish: Kadınlar Dünyası) was a women's magazine that was published in Turkey from 4 April 1913, after the Balkan Wars, until 1921. The founder of the magazine was Nuriye Ulviye Mevlan Civelek. It was published by women writers in the Ottoman Society for the Defence of Women's Rights (Turkish: Osmanlı Müdafaa-i Hukuk-ı Nisvan Cemiyeti).

The magazine's purpose was to increase women's rights and freedoms, to raise awareness of women and to enable them to be active in work and social life. It was the first explicitly feminist magazine of the Ottoman Empire, and the first to publish photographs of Ottoman Muslim women. The first 100 issues of Women's World, copies of which are in the archives of the Women's Works Library and Information Center Foundation, were transliterated into Roman script and republished by the foundation in 2009.

== Background ==
Building on the societal change that took place through the Tanzimat and the Constitutional Monarchy, education beyond primary school became available to women for the first time, and women started to be more active in the Turkish press. The Ottoman women's movement began to demand rights, in particular working to increase women's access to education and paid work, to abolish polygamy, and to reform dress codes, especially with respect to the peçe, an Islamic veil.

== Founding ==
In April 1913 Nuriye Ulviye Mevlan Civelek founded Women's World magazine with the legacy of her husband, Hulusi Bey. Civelek also established the Ottoman Society for the Defense of Women's Rights (also translated as the Association for the Defence of the Rights of Ottoman Women, in Turkish: Osmanlı Müdâfaa-i Hukuk-ı Nisvan Cemiyeti), to campaign for new rights and a freer social life for women. The association was established either in 1912 or 1913.

Women's World called on all women to fight for their rights, with a stated goal 'to defend the rights and interests of womanhood'. The first issue of the magazine explained their position:

"Until our rights are recognised in public law, until men and women are equal in every profession, Kadınlar Dünyası will not welcome men in its pages... Yes, some of the Ottoman men defend us Ottoman women. We see that and we thank them. However, we Ottoman women have our own ways and manners, and male writers can understand neither this, nor our psychology. Let them please leave us alone and not make toys for their dreams out of us. We can defend our rights by our own efforts." (Kadınlar Dünyası Editorial 1913).

== Publication ==
The first issue of the magazine was published on 4 April 1913, and it appeared daily for the first hundred issues. Initially, each issue was four-pages, without pictures. After the 100th issue, the journal had 16 pages with illustrations, and was published weekly. The magazine broke new ground as the first to publish photographs of Ottoman Muslim women.

The magazine owned their own printing press, and all staff from the editor, the writers, the typesetters and the printers, were women. After it was printed in the Serbesti Printing House in Binbirdirek, it was distributed centrally in the Marifet Library in Beşiktaş, and then local distribution and sales were made in similar libraries.

The French influence in the Ottoman Empire was also reflected in the magazine, and the French name "Monde Féminin" was placed on the bottom corner of the cover. A French supplement was given for a short time between issues 121 and 128. The reason for this supplement is explained in the magazine as "to ensure the mutual dialogue of our brothers and sisters in Europe".

Although there is no exact information about the circulation of Women's World, an advertisement published in the 165th issue gives clues; the advertisement announces that 3,000 copies of the magazine will be printed due to paper shortages and that readers should subscribe to avoid the trouble of finding the magazine. Considering the war conditions of the period, this number is remarkable.

The editor-in-chief of the magazine was Emine Seher Hanim until the 108th issue. Regular contributors included Mükerrem Belkıs, Atiye Şükran, Aliye Cevat, Safiye Büran, Aziz Haydar (1881–?), Nimet Cemil, Meliha Cenan, Belkıs Şevket, Fatma Zerrin, Seniye Ata, Sacide and Mes'adet Bedirhan. Haydar also opened and financed a private school for girls.

== Contents ==
Women's World, which was written by and for women, included a large number of advertisements, as well as editorials, essays, short tales, translations, and audience letters, all of which addressed women's duties and problems. In contrast to other magazines aimed at women at the time, it drew contributions from women from all sectors of society. The focus of the magazine was the visibility of women in social life, participation in working life, reorganization of the rules on clothing outside the home, improving the education of girls, providing higher education for women, preventing marriages by arrangement, and improving the family.

The magazine, which is a pioneering example of the struggle for independent and solidarity women in the Ottoman Empire, is noteworthy not only for its openness to women writers but also for its wide coverage of letters from its readers, which led to a diversity of viewpoints and the opportunity to respond to readers' concerns.

== Closure ==
The Istanbul Library has 204 issues of Women's World in their catalogue. The last issue was published on 21 May 1921.

== Reception and legacy ==
Women's World advocated a "women's revolution" that would protect the rights of every woman, regardless of nationality, religion or social status. Considering the nationalist environment of the period, triggered especially by the Balkan Wars, the importance of this principle can be understood. In this respect, Women's World differs from other women's publications of the period, such as Ladies' Mahsus Gazette, which were dominated by nationalist rhetoric and that only accepted contributions from intellectual women. For this reason, Women's World is considered the first feminist publication in the Ottoman Empire. Historian Serpil Çakır considers Kadınlar Dünyası "the most radical of the Ottoman women’s journals, in that it did not allow male writers to write in its columns".

Women's World uses the word "feminism" as well as "Hukuk-i nisvan" (women's rights) and gives wide coverage of discussions on feminism. In response to the criticisms directed at the magazine by men that feminism is a word of foreign origin and therefore “not a concept belonging to this culture”, it replied that words such as “telegraph” and “tram” are not Turkish, but are adopted and used by everyone.

Women's World advocated for women's rights in general but also ran campaigns on specific issues. As a result of one such campaign, seven women telephone operators were employed at the national telephone company. A campaign centred around Women's World to allow women access to higher education led directly to the opening of The Women's University İnas Dârülfunûnu (now a part of Istanbul University) in September 1914, followed by the Academy of Fine Arts for Women, İnas Sanayi-i Nefise Mektebi.

The magazine received attention, congratulations and encouragement from the foreign press, and reporters Grace Ellison from The Times and Odette Feldman from the Berliner Tageblatt visited the editorial offices.

Ulviye Mevlan's husband, journalist Mevlanzade Rıfat, also established the magazine Men's World (Turkish Erkekler Dünyası) in order to support women's struggle for rights, although only one issue of the magazine was published.

In 2009, the first 100 issues of Women's World were transliterated into Roman script and republished by the Women's Works Library and Information Center Foundation.

== See also ==
- Women in Turkey
- Education in Turkey
