= Çakmak, Gönen =

Village in Turkey

Çakmak
- Neighbourhood
- Location in Turkey Çakmak (Marmara)
- Coordinates: 40.090°N 27.737°E
- Country: Turkey
- Province: Balıkesir
- District: Gönen
- Population (2022): 186
- Time zone: UTC+3 (TRT)

Çakmak is a neighbourhood in the municipality and district of Gönen, Balıkesir Province in Turkey. Its population is 186 (2022).
