= Gaybular, Gönen =

Village in Turkey

Gaybular
- Neighbourhood
- Location in Turkey Gaybular (Marmara)
- Coordinates: 40°02′02″N 27°31′23″E
- Country: Turkey
- Province: Balıkesir
- District: Gönen
- Population (2022): 245
- Time zone: UTC+3 (TRT)

Gaybular is a neighbourhood in the municipality and district of Gönen, Balıkesir Province in Turkey. Its population is 245 (2022).
