= Canbaz, Gönen =

Village in Turkey

Canbaz
- Neighbourhood
- Location in Turkey Canbaz (Marmara)
- Coordinates: 40.019°N 27.605°E
- Country: Turkey
- Province: Balıkesir
- District: Gönen
- Population (2022): 107
- Time zone: UTC+3 (TRT)

Canbaz is a neighbourhood in the municipality and district of Gönen, Balıkesir Province in Turkey. Its population is 107 (2022).
