= Ulukır, Gönen =

Village in Turkey

Ulukır
- Neighbourhood
- Location in Turkey Ulukır (Marmara)
- Coordinates: 40°14′27″N 27°37′28″E
- Country: Turkey
- Province: Balıkesir
- District: Gönen
- Population (2022): 386
- Time zone: UTC+3 (TRT)

Ulukır is a neighbourhood in the municipality and district of Gönen, Balıkesir Province in Turkey. Its population is 386 (2022).
