= Gönen =

- District and municipality
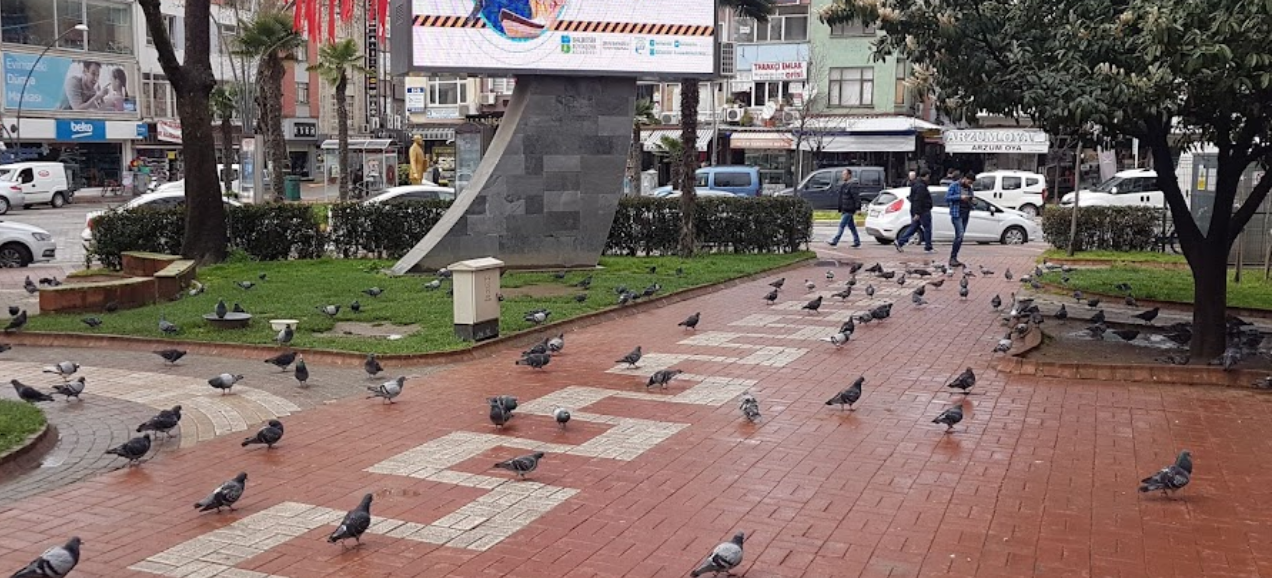
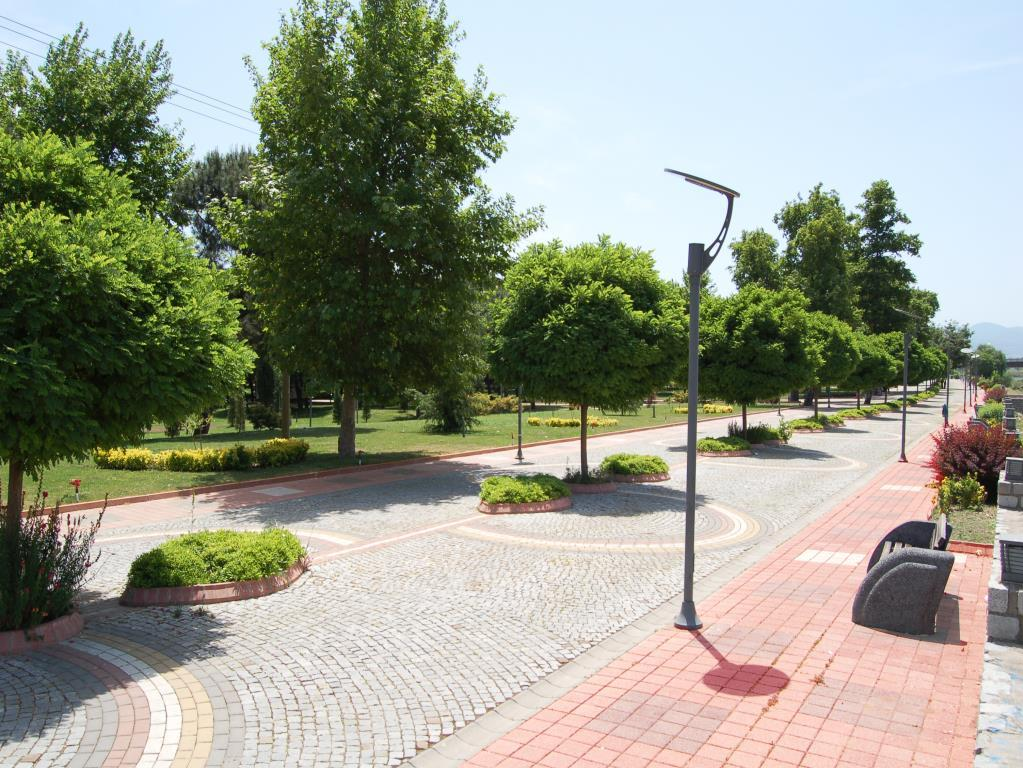
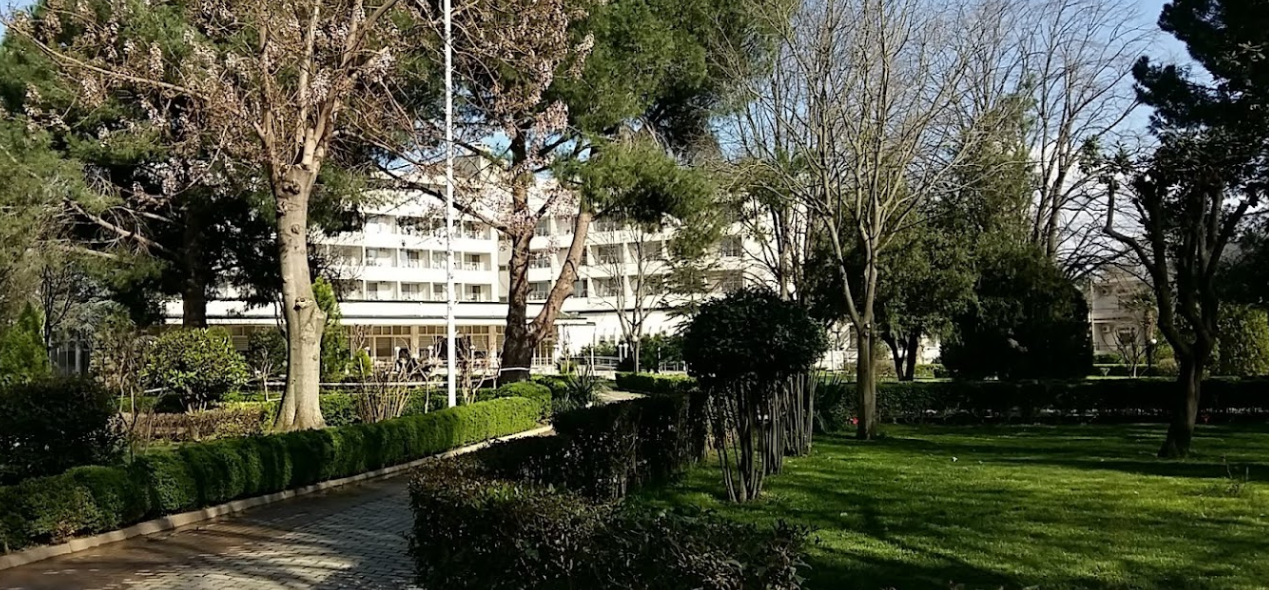
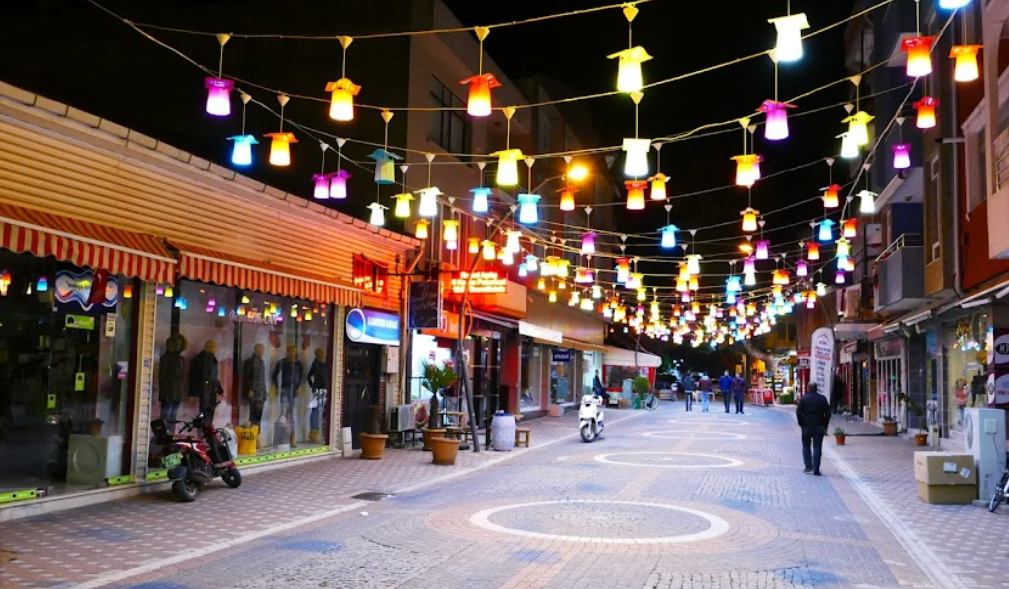

- Map showing Gönen District in Balıkesir Province

- Location within Turkey Location within Marmara
- Coordinates: 40°6′30″N 27°39′3″E
- Country: Turkey
- Province: Balıkesir

Government
  - Mayor: İbrahim Palaz (CHP)
- Area: 1,162 km^{2} (449 sq mi)
- Elevation: 33 m (108 ft)
- Population (2022): 74,871
  - Density: 64.43/km^{2} (166.9/sq mi)
- Time zone: UTC+3 (TRT)
- Postal code: 10900
- Area code: 0266
- Website: www.balikesirgonen.bel.tr

Gönen is a municipality and district of Balıkesir Province, Turkey. Its area is 1,162 km^{2}, and its population is 74,871 (2022). It lies on the southern part of Marmara Sea. The town is mostly known for its therapeutic hot springs, leather processing and rice production.

== Location ==
The town is surrounded by Bandırma in the northeast, Biga and Yenice in the west, Marmara Sea and Gulf of Erdek and Balya in the south. Elevation is 33 metres (108 ft) above sea level.Green Gönen

== Names and etymology ==
The oldest known name of the town is Asepsus (Ασεψούς in Ancient greek). This was also the name of the brook, that flows next to the city center and was crossed by the Roman Aesepus Bridge. Research shows that the subsequent name was Artemea (Αρτεμέα), a derivation of the Greek goddess Artemis.

After the Ottoman conquest the name Gönen was used. The etymological source of that name is still disputed. Widely accepted possibilities are:

- Non-Turkish possibilities:
  - Ka-wana : A word meaning "Sheepland/Sheep Country" in Luwian
  - Germenon : A word meaning "Hot Spring"
  - Giunan : A word meaning "Greek" (Yion in ancient Greek), becoming "Giunen" and then "Gonen" in Turkish
- Possible meanings in Turkish:
  - A small pond that dries in summer, small pond, placid water
  - Humid, wet, well-watered.

Also, some sources indicate that there was a nomadic tribe of the "Yörükan community" bearing the name "Gönen","Gönan" or "Gönenlü". The tribe was loosely based around Adana and Maraş.

== History ==
According to Evliya Çelebi's Seyahatname (In which he collected the notes of his journeys), Gönen was used by the governors of Bursa as a summer holiday location, where they enjoyed the therapeutic uses of the hot springs.

On 18 March 1953, Gönen suffered a M7.3 earthquake which left 50 dead in Gönen and hundreds of buildings damaged. a previous devastating earthquake had occurred here in 1440 AD.

== Composition ==
There are 101 neighbourhoods in Gönen District:

- 100.Yıl
- Akçaali
- Akçapınar
- Alacaoluk
- Alaettin
- Alaşar
- Altay
- Armutlu
- Asmalıdere
- Atıcıoba
- Ayvalıdere
- Babayaka
- Bakırlı
- Balcı
- Balcıdede
- Bayramiç
- Beyoluk
- Bostancı
- Buğdaylı
- Büyüksoğuklar
- Çakmak
- Çalıca
- Çalıoba
- Canbaz
- Çatak
- Çifteçeşmeler
- Çiftlikalanı
- Çığmış
- Çınarlı
- Çınarpınar
- Çobanhamidiye
- Dereköy
- Dişbudak
- Dumanalanı
- Ekşidere
- Fındıklı
- Gaybular
- Gebeçınar
- Gelgeç
- Geyikli
- Gökçesu
- Gündoğan
- Gündoğdu
- Güneşli
- Hacımenteş
- Hacıvelioba
- Hafızhüseyinbey
- Hasanbey
- Havutça
- Hodul
- Ilıcak
- Ilıcaoba
- İncirli
- Kalburcu
- Kalfaköy
- Kaplanobası
- Karaağaç Alanı
- Karalarçiftliği
- Karasukabaklar
- Karşıyaka
- Kavakalanı
- Kavakoba
- Keçeler
- Killik
- Kınalar
- Kocapınar
- Koçbayırı
- Körpeağaç
- Korudeğirmen
- Köteyli
- Küçüksoğuklar
- Kumköy
- Küpçıktı
- Kurtuluş
- Malkoç
- Muratlar
- Ömerler
- Ortaoba
- Osmanpazar
- Paşaçiftliği
- Pehlivanhoca
- Plevne
- Reşadiye
- Rüstem
- Saraçlar
- Sarıköy
- Şaroluk
- Sebepli
- Söğütköy
- Suçıktı
- Tahtalı
- Taştepe
- Tırnova
- Turplu
- Tütüncü
- Tuzakçı
- Üçpınar
- Ulukır
- Üzümlü
- Yeniakçapınar
- Yürükkeçidere

== Climate ==
Climate data for Gönen (1991-2020)
Month	Jan	Feb	Mar	Apr	May	Jun	Jul	Aug	Sep	Oct	Nov	Dec	Year
Mean daily maximum °C (°F)	9.7 (49.5)	11.0 (51.8)	14.2 (57.6)	19.0 (66.2)	24.3 (75.7)	29.0 (84.2)	30.7 (87.3)	30.7 (87.3)	27.2 (81.0)	21.8 (71.2)	16.2 (61.2)	11.3 (52.3)	20.4 (68.8)
Daily mean °C (°F)	5.3 (41.5)	6.2 (43.2)	8.7 (47.7)	12.5 (54.5)	17.5 (63.5)	22.2 (72.0)	24.5 (76.1)	24.5 (76.1)	20.4 (68.7)	15.8 (60.4)	10.8 (51.4)	7.0 (44.6)	14.6 (58.3)
Mean daily minimum °C (°F)	1.6 (34.9)	2.2 (36.0)	3.9 (39.0)	6.6 (43.9)	11.0 (51.8)	15.3 (59.5)	18.0 (64.4)	18.6 (65.5)	14.4 (57.9)	10.9 (51.6)	6.4 (43.5)	3.6 (38.5)	9.4 (48.9)
Average precipitation mm (inches)	86.3 (3.40)	84.3 (3.32)	68.3 (2.69)	55.2 (2.17)	39.5 (1.56)	31.0 (1.22)	11.0 (0.43)	13.6 (0.54)	43.1 (1.70)	73.7 (2.90)	76.2 (3.00)	100.0 (3.94)	682.2 (26.87)
Average precipitation days (≥ 1.0 mm)	8.9	9.1	8.1	7.2	5.2	3.7	1.9	2.1	4.3	6.6	6.9	10.6	74.6
Average relative humidity (%)	82.8	79.9	76.1	74.1	72.3	67.5	66.3	68.5	71.8	79.2	82	83.5	75.3
Source: NOAA NCEI

== Transport ==
City/Town	Distance
Bandırma	45 km
Balıkesir	145 km
Çanakkale	150 km
Bursa	155 km

Using available high speed ferry services, it takes 2 hours to reach Istanbul. The only train route available is to İzmir, but this is mostly used for cargo, rather than passenger transportation. Local air service is available through Bursa. International flights are handled through İstanbul and İzmir.
