= Dumanalanı, Gönen =

Village in Turkey

Dumanalanı
- Neighbourhood
- Location in Turkey Dumanalanı (Marmara)
- Coordinates: 40°08′07″N 27°31′52″E
- Country: Turkey
- Province: Balıkesir
- District: Gönen
- Population (2022): 27
- Time zone: UTC+3 (TRT)

Dumanalanı is a neighbourhood in the municipality and district of Gönen, Balıkesir Province in Turkey. Its population is 27 (2022).

This region has a Mediterranean climate. The climate is similar to Gönen district, but it is colder and rainier throughout the year.
