= Osmanlı Müdafaa-i Hukuk-ı Nisvan Cemiyeti =

Women's organization in the Ottoman Empire

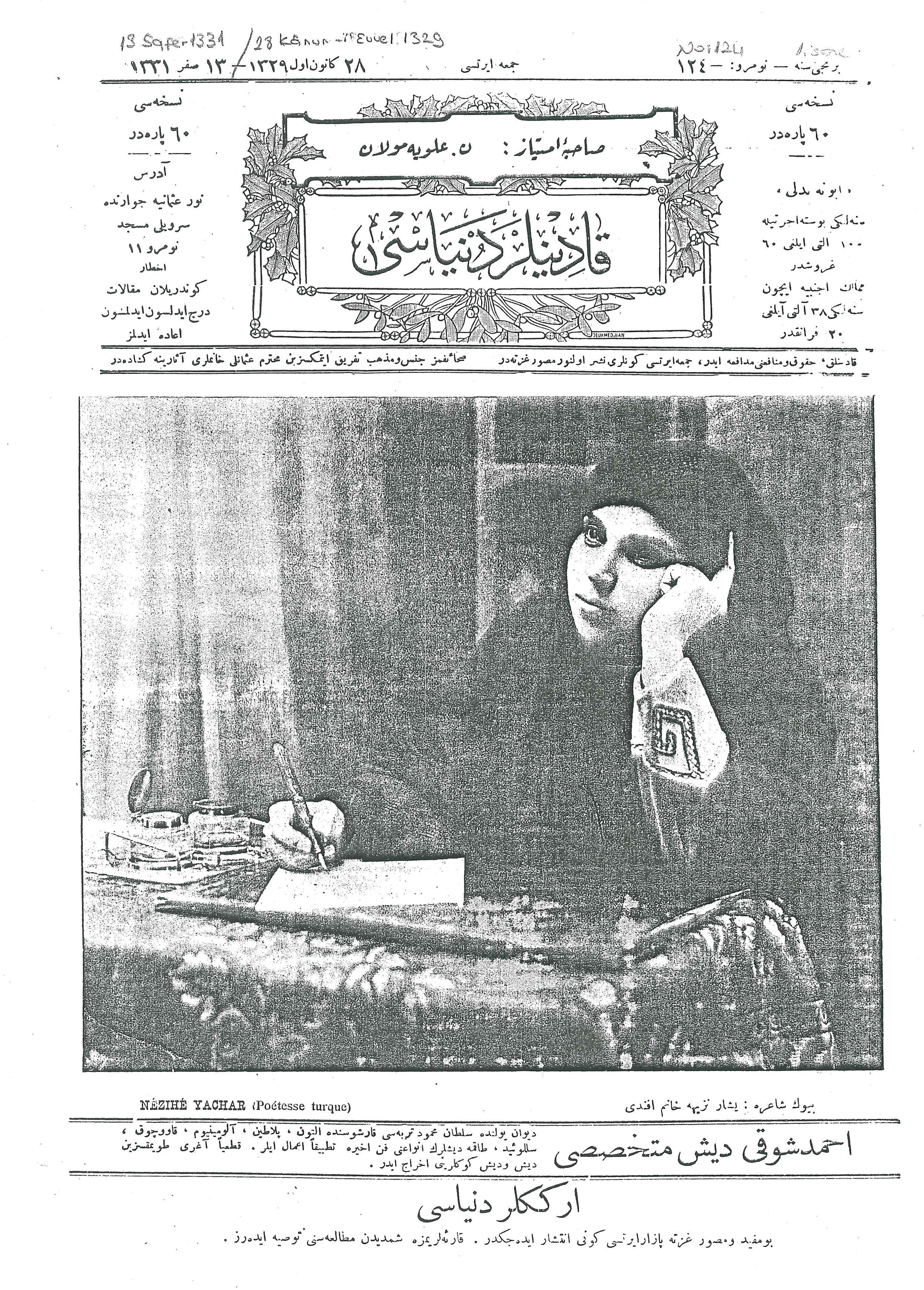
Kadınlar Dünyası

Osmanlı Müdafaa-ı Hukûk-ı Nisvan Cemiyeti (Ottoman Society for the Defense of Women's Rights) was a women's organization in the Ottoman Empire, founded in 1913. It was the first Muslim women's organization as well as the main women's suffrage organization in Ottoman Empire and later day Turkey.

== History ==
The issue of women's rights had been discussed during the Tanzimat era of modernization reforms in the 19th century, when girls' schools had been founded and a women's press emerged. However, it was not until after the Revolution of 1908 that it became possible to establish a political organization to actively work for women's rights. The Osmanlı Müdafaa-ı Hukûk-ı Nisvan Cemiyeti was founded by Nuriye Ulviye Mevlan Civelek in 1913. It became the main force within the new Turkish women's movement.

The organization mainly worked through the women's magazine Women's World (Turkish: Kadınlar Dünyası), which had been established the same year. The magazine voiced the demands of the organization. The Osmanlı Müdafaa-ı Hukûk-ı Nisvan Cemiyeti advocated for women's liberation and participation in society alongside men by educating and enrolling women in the work force.

It also spoke in favor of dress reform and advocated the removal of the veil, at least by replacing the full covering veil with a simple headscarf. The Kadınlar Dünyası was the first Muslim magazine to publish photographs of women (highly controversial at the time) and featured unveiled women dressed in modern costumes, primarily members and contributors of the Osmanlı Müdafaa-ı Hukûk-ı Nisvan Cemiyeti and the Kadınlar Dünyası.

== See also ==
- Sade Giyinen Hanımlar Cemiyeti
