= Yürükkeçidere, Gönen =

Village in Turkey

Yürükkeçidere
- Neighbourhood
- Location in Turkey Yürükkeçidere (Marmara)
- Coordinates: 40.130°N 27.564°E
- Country: Turkey
- Province: Balıkesir
- District: Gönen
- Population (2024): 64
- Time zone: UTC+3 (TRT)

Yürükkeçidere is a neighbourhood in the municipality and district of Gönen, Balıkesir Province in Turkey. Its population is 50 (2022).
