= Balcı, Gönen =

Village in Turkey

Balcı
- Neighbourhood
- Location in Turkey Balcı (Marmara)
- Coordinates: 40.053°N 27.595°E
- Country: Turkey
- Province: Balıkesir
- District: Gönen
- Population (2022): 179
- Time zone: UTC+3 (TRT)

Balcı is a neighbourhood in the municipality and district of Gönen, Balıkesir Province in Turkey. Its population is 179 (2022).
