= Atıcıoba, Gönen =

Village in Turkey

Atıcıoba
- Neighbourhood
- Location in Turkey Atıcıoba (Marmara)
- Coordinates: 40.085°N 27.566°E
- Country: Turkey
- Province: Balıkesir
- District: Gönen
- Population (2022): 138
- Time zone: UTC+3 (TRT)

Atıcıoba is a neighbourhood in the municipality and district of Gönen, Balıkesir Province in Turkey. Its population is 138 (2022).
