= Bakırlı, Gönen =

Village in Turkey

Bakırlı
- Neighbourhood
- Location in Turkey Bakırlı (Marmara)
- Coordinates: 40.098°N 27.626°E
- Country: Turkey
- Province: Balıkesir
- District: Gönen
- Population (2022): 211
- Time zone: UTC+3 (TRT)

Bakırlı is a neighbourhood in the municipality and district of Gönen, Balıkesir Province in Turkey. Its population is 211 (2022).
