= Alacaoluk, Gönen =

Village in Turkey

Alacaoluk
- Neighbourhood
- Location in Turkey Alacaoluk (Marmara)
- Coordinates: 40°05′56″N 27°31′00″E
- Country: Turkey
- Province: Balıkesir
- District: Gönen
- Population (2022): 62
- Time zone: UTC+3 (TRT)

Alacaoluk is a neighbourhood in the municipality and district of Gönen, Balıkesir Province in Turkey. Its population is 62 (2022).
