= Fındıklı, Gönen =

Village in Turkey

Fındıklı
- Neighbourhood
- Location in Turkey Fındıklı (Marmara)
- Coordinates: 39.962°N 27.537°E
- Country: Turkey
- Province: Balıkesir
- District: Gönen
- Population (2022): 366
- Time zone: UTC+3 (TRT)

Fındıklı is a neighbourhood in the municipality and district of Gönen, Balıkesir Province in Turkey. Its population is 366 (2022).

Climate

It is famous for its Black Sea-like nature and has one of the coldest climates in Gönen district. This village is heavily forested and its climate is similar to the Rainforest type in the north (with colder winters and drier summers). It is one of the first places where it snows in Gönen district.
