= Gündoğan, Gönen =

Village in Turkey

Gündoğan
- Neighbourhood
- Location in Turkey Gündoğan (Marmara)
- Coordinates: 40.17°N 27.63°E
- Country: Turkey
- Province: Balıkesir
- District: Gönen
- Population (2022): 1,328
- Time zone: UTC+3 (TRT)

Gündoğan is a neighbourhood in the municipality and district of Gönen, Balıkesir Province in Turkey. Its population is 1,328 (2022).
