= Çatak, Gönen =

Village in Turkey

Çatak
- Neighbourhood
- Location in Turkey Çatak (Marmara)
- Coordinates: 39.965°N 27.673°E
- Country: Turkey
- Province: Balıkesir
- District: Gönen
- Population (2022): 76
- Time zone: UTC+3 (TRT)

Çatak is a neighbourhood in the municipality and district of Gönen, Balıkesir Province in Turkey. Its population is 76 (2022).
