= Çığmış, Gönen =

Village in Turkey

Çığmış
- Neighbourhood
- Location in Turkey Çığmış (Marmara)
- Coordinates: 40°09′27″N 27°33′37″E
- Country: Turkey
- Province: Balıkesir
- District: Gönen
- Population (2022): 70
- Time zone: UTC+3 (TRT)

Çığmış is a neighbourhood in the municipality and district of Gönen, Balıkesir Province in Turkey. Its population is 70 (2022).
