= Bostancı, Gönen =

Village in Turkey

Bostancı
- Neighbourhood
- Location in Turkey Bostancı (Marmara)
- Coordinates: 40.214°N 27.692°E
- Country: Turkey
- Province: Balıkesir
- District: Gönen
- Population (2022): 466
- Time zone: UTC+3 (TRT)

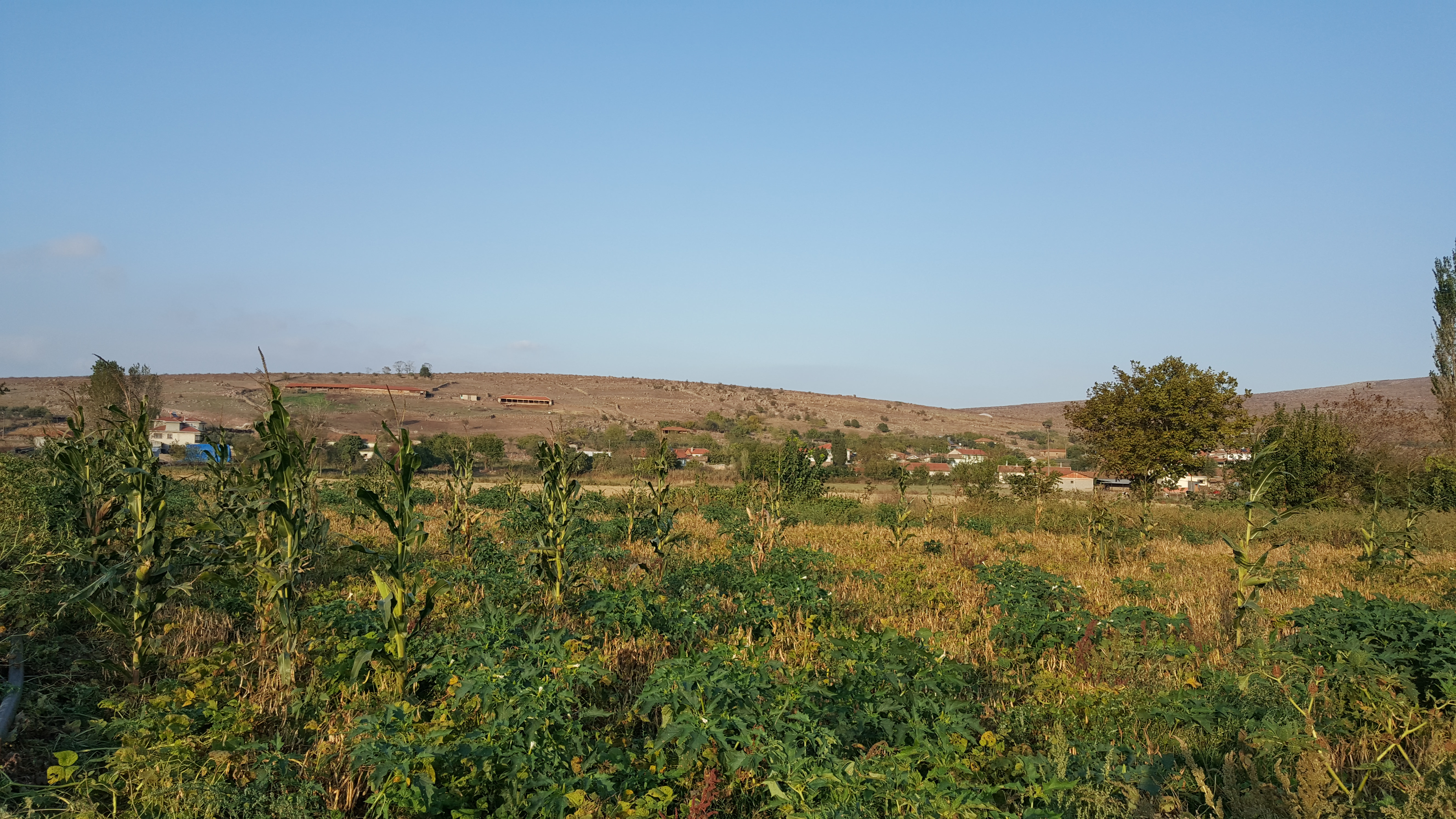

Bostancı is a neighbourhood in the municipality and district of Gönen, Balıkesir Province in Turkey. Its population is 466 (2022).
