= Büyüksoğuklar, Gönen =

Neighbourhood in Balıkesir Province, Turkey

Büyüksoğuklar
- Neighbourhood
- Location in Turkey Büyüksoğuklar (Marmara)
- Coordinates: 40°12′00″N 27°49′17″E
- Country: Turkey
- Province: Balıkesir
- District: Gönen
- Population (2022): 232
- Time zone: UTC+3 (TRT)

Büyüksoğuklar is a neighbourhood in the municipality and district of Gönen, Balıkesir Province in Turkey. Its population is 232 (2022).
