= Çiftlikalanı, Gönen =

Village in Turkey

Çiftlikalanı
- Neighbourhood
- Location in Turkey Çiftlikalanı (Marmara)
- Coordinates: 40°02′03″N 27°42′59″E
- Country: Turkey
- Province: Balıkesir
- District: Gönen
- Population (2022): 37
- Time zone: UTC+3 (TRT)

Çiftlikalanı is a neighbourhood in the municipality and district of Gönen, Balıkesir Province in Turkey. Its population is 37 (2022).
