= Babayaka, Gönen =

Village in Turkey

Babayaka
- Neighbourhood
- Location in Turkey Babayaka (Marmara)
- Coordinates: 40°08′54″N 27°36′34″E
- Country: Turkey
- Province: Balıkesir
- District: Gönen
- Population (2022): 154
- Time zone: UTC+3 (TRT)

Babayaka is a neighbourhood in the municipality and district of Gönen, Balıkesir Province in Turkey. Its population is 154 (2022).
