= Gelgeç, Gönen =

Village in Turkey

Gelgeç
- Neighbourhood
- Location in Turkey Gelgeç (Marmara)
- Coordinates: 40°11′56″N 27°33′02″E
- Country: Turkey
- Province: Balıkesir
- District: Gönen
- Population (2022): 135
- Time zone: UTC+3 (TRT)

Gelgeç is a neighbourhood in the municipality and district of Gönen, Balıkesir Province in Turkey. Its population is 135 (2022).
