= Balcıdede, Gönen =

Village in Turkey

Balcıdede
- Neighbourhood
- Location in Turkey Balcıdede (Marmara)
- Coordinates: 40°02′37″N 27°36′30″E
- Country: Turkey
- Province: Balıkesir
- District: Gönen
- Population (2022): 88
- Time zone: UTC+3 (TRT)

Balcıdede is a neighbourhood in the municipality and district of Gönen, Balıkesir Province in Turkey. Its population is 88 (2022).
