= Çobanhamidiye, Gönen =

Village in Turkey

Çobanhamidiye
- Neighbourhood
- Location in Turkey Çobanhamidiye (Marmara)
- Coordinates: 40°01′30″N 27°42′42″E
- Country: Turkey
- Province: Balıkesir
- District: Gönen
- Population (2022): 265
- Time zone: UTC+3 (TRT)

Çobanhamidiye is a neighbourhood in the municipality and district of Gönen, Balıkesir Province in Turkey. Its population is 265 (2022).
