= Çalıoba, Gönen =

Village in Turkey

Çalıoba
- Neighbourhood
- Location in Turkey Çalıoba (Marmara)
- Coordinates: 40°10′45″N 27°43′40″E
- Country: Turkey
- Province: Balıkesir
- District: Gönen
- Population (2022): 122
- Time zone: UTC+3 (TRT)

Çalıoba is a neighbourhood in the municipality and district of Gönen, Balıkesir Province in Turkey. Its population is 122 (2022).
