= Hacımenteş, Gönen =

Village in Turkey

Hacımenteş
- Neighbourhood
- Location in Turkey Hacımenteş (Marmara)
- Coordinates: 40°09′33″N 27°45′52″E
- Country: Turkey
- Province: Balıkesir
- District: Gönen
- Population (2022): 28
- Time zone: UTC+3 (TRT)

Hacımenteş is a neighbourhood in the municipality and district of Gönen, Balıkesir Province in Turkey. Its population is 28 (2022).
