= Çınarpınar, Gönen =

Village in Turkey

Çınarpınar
- Neighbourhood
- Location in Turkey Çınarpınar (Marmara)
- Coordinates: 40°05′43″N 27°34′28″E
- Country: Turkey
- Province: Balıkesir
- District: Gönen
- Population (2022): 47
- Time zone: UTC+3 (TRT)

Çınarpınar is a neighbourhood in the municipality and district of Gönen, Balıkesir Province in Turkey. Its population is 47 (2022).
