= Action Army =

Group within the Ottoman Army which suppressed the 1909 countercoup

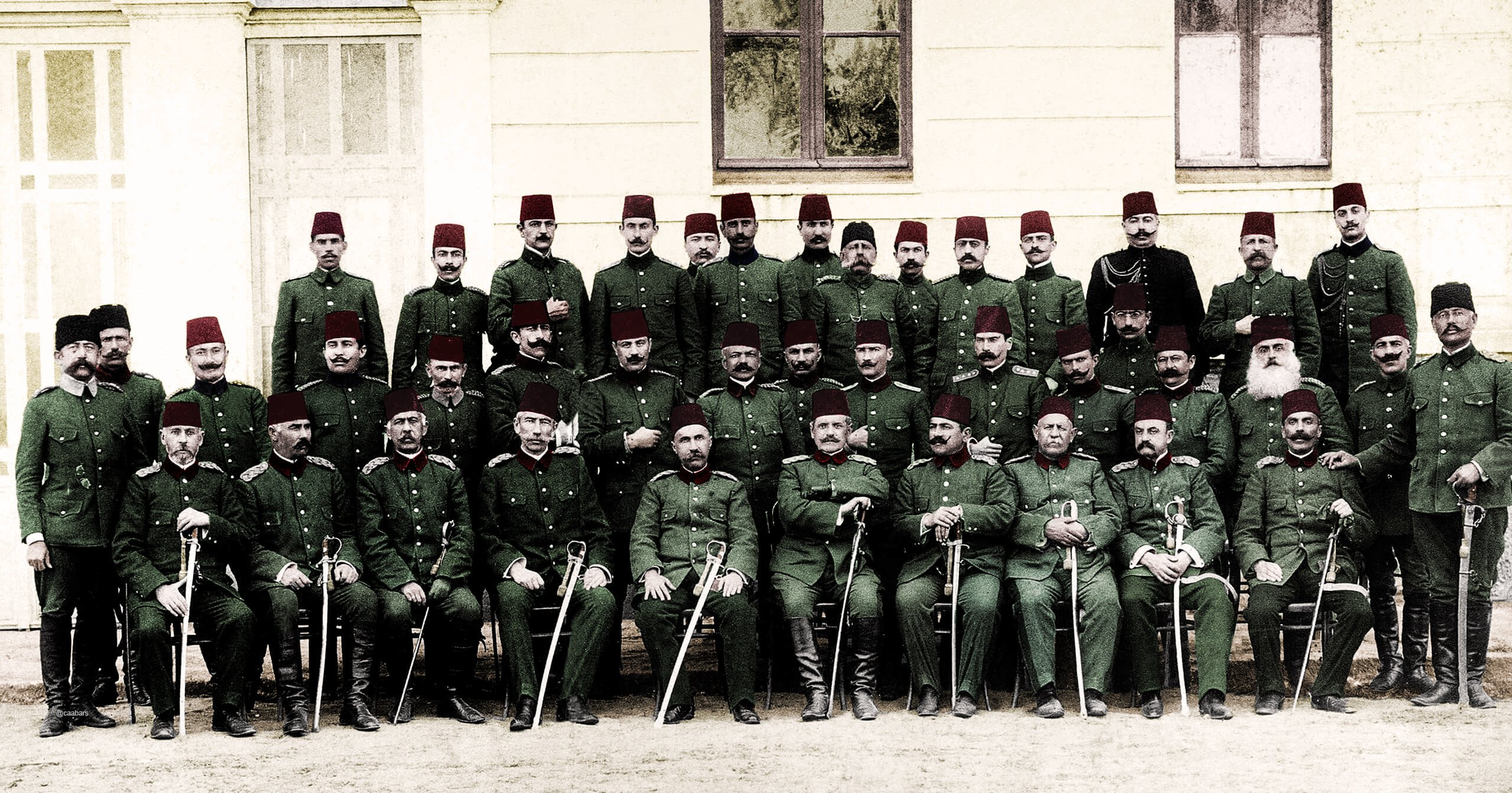
Together with the Turkish Action Army Staff and the officers of the I. Corps at the III. Army Headquarters in Thessaloniki (13 April 1909)

The Action Army (Turkish: Hareket Ordusu), also translated as the Army of Action or Operation Army, was a rebellion force formed by elements of the Ottoman Army sympathetic to the Committee of Union and Progress (CUP) during the 31 March Incident, sometimes referred to as the 1909 countercoup. Mobilised in Selanik (modern Thessaloniki) by Mahmud Shevket Pasha, it occupied Istanbul and successfully suppressed the uprising in the 31 March Incident.

== Background ==
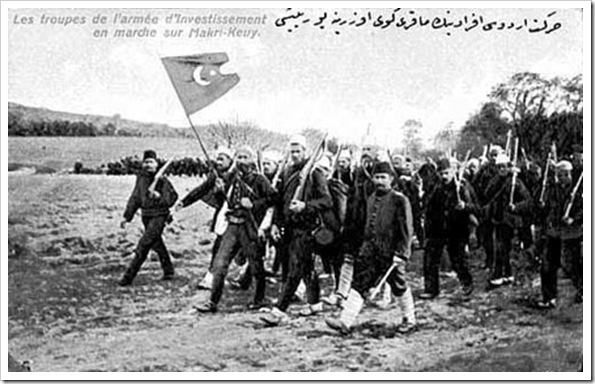
The Action Army marching on Makri Keuy (modern Bakırköy)

The 1908 Young Turk Revolution, led by the Committee of Union and Progress, forced Sultan Abdul Hamid II to restore a system of constitutional monarchy, ushering in the Second Constitutional Era. The 1909 countercoup was instigated by a mutiny of dissatisfied troops in Istanbul, who were joined by reactionary religious protestors demanding a return to autocracy under Abdul Hamid and sharia (sacred law). With the resignation of Hüseyin Hilmi Pasha's cabinet the mutiny developed into a wider political crisis.

== Composition ==
The Action Army was organised by Mahmud Shevket Pasha, commander of the Third Army based in Selanik. A number of staff officers opposed to the countercoup gathered in Selanik to join the force. It was also supported by divisions from the Second Army stationed in Adrianople (modern Edirne).

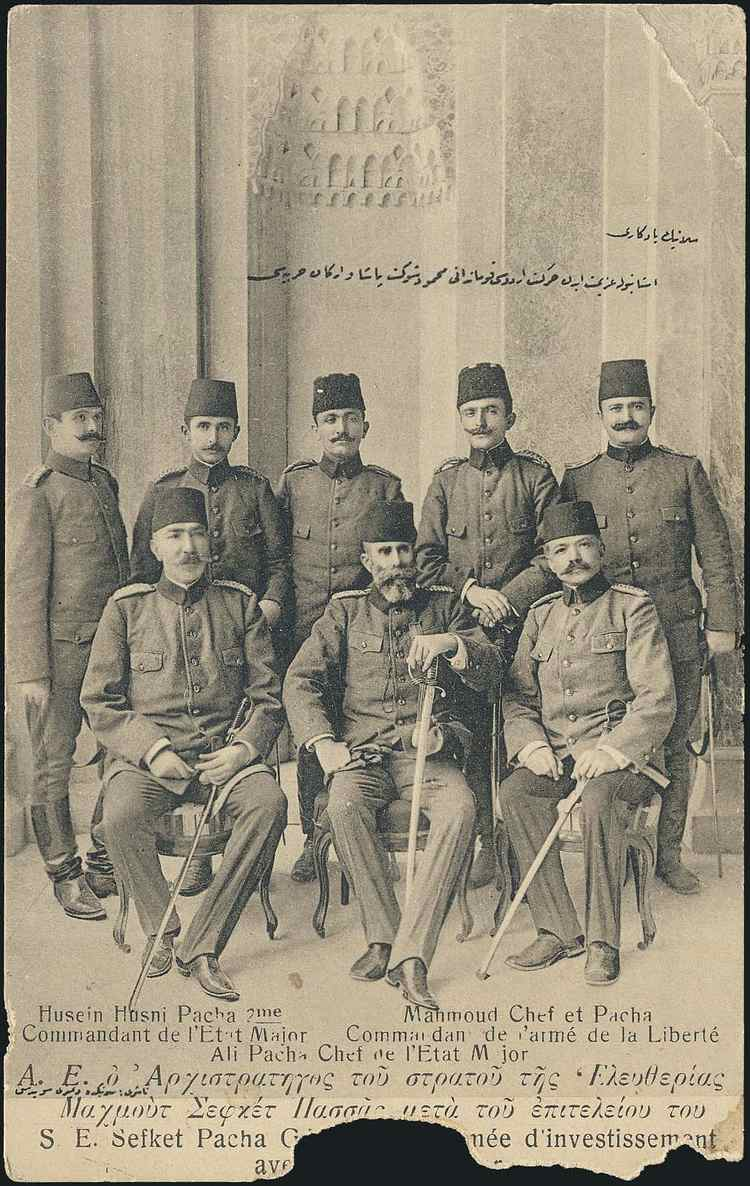
Staff of the Action army. To Şevket Pasha's left, Hüseyin Hüsnü, behind Hüsnü and second from left Ismet Pasha, to his right İsmail Hakkı Bey, to his right Enver Bey.

The force numbered around 20,000–25,000 Ottoman soldiers and was supplemented by 15,000 volunteers, including 4,000 Bulgarians, 2,000 Greeks and 700 Jews. Çerçiz Topulli and Bajram Curri brought 8,000 Albanians troops, and Major Ahmed Niyazi Bey arrived with 1,800 men from Resne.

== Legacy ==
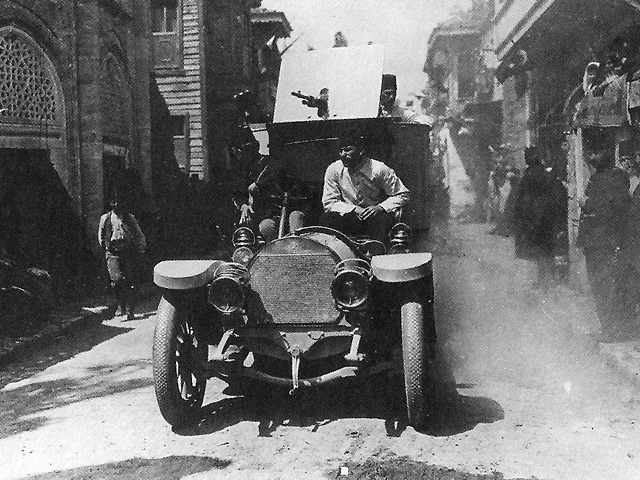
Action Army forces entering Istanbul

Some have compared the Action Army to a band of marauders (çapulcu in Turkish). One such example is Shaykh Nazim in some of his discourses. Mustafa Kemal Bey was involved as a captain.

== Marching song ==
Turkish

Selanik'tan çıktılar, İstanbul'u tuttular,
İstibdadı yıktılar,
Kimdir onlar?
Hareket ordusu!

Adu yoluna durdular, kılıca el vurdular,
Zalimleri kırdılar,
Kimdir onlar?
Hareket ordusu!

English

They left Thessaloniki, they captured Istanbul,
They destroyed the tyranny,
Who are they?
The Action Army!

They set out on the road to the foe, they put their hand to the sword,
They smashed the tyrants,
Who are they?
The Action Army!
