= Ayvalıdere, Gönen =

Village in Turkey

Ayvalıdere
- Neighbourhood
- Location in Turkey Ayvalıdere (Marmara)
- Coordinates: 40.236°N 27.645°E
- Country: Turkey
- Province: Balıkesir
- District: Gönen
- Population (2022): 45
- Time zone: UTC+3 (TRT)

Ayvalıdere is a neighbourhood in the municipality and district of Gönen, Balıkesir Province in Turkey. Its population is 45 (2022).
