= Ekşidere, Gönen =

Village in Turkey

Ekşidere
- Neighbourhood
- Location in Turkey Ekşidere (Marmara)
- Coordinates: 40°02′53″N 27°34′58″E
- Country: Turkey
- Province: Balıkesir
- District: Gönen
- Population (2022): 215
- Time zone: UTC+3 (TRT)

Ekşidere is a neighbourhood in the municipality and district of Gönen, Balıkesir Province in Turkey. Its population is 215 (2022).
