= Sade Giyinen Hanımlar Cemiyeti =

Turkish women's rights organization

Sade Giyinen Hanımlar Cemiyeti was an Ottoman women's rights organization, founded in 1918. It focused on the liberation of women via dress reform, and played a part in the campaign against compulsory hijab (veiling) in Turkey.

== History ==
Women's rights became an issue of public debate in the Ottoman Empire in the second half of the 19th century, after the modernization reforms of the Tanzimat era, which introduced some moderate reforms such as girls' schools, education of female teachers and a women's press. No women's movement could however organize until the Young Turk Revolution of 1908 made it legal to create political organizations.

The Sade Giyinen Hanımlar Cemiyeti was founded in 1918 to campaign for a reform in women's dress, specifically to promote unveiling. They promoted the active participation of women in public society by encouraging them to educate themselves and become professional, which would give them financial independence and give them freedom, in parallel with becoming useful members of society. They viewed a dress reform and the liberation of women from veiling as necessary for them to achieve this public position, and saw the veil as an obstacle for women's active participation in society. Dress reform an unveiling was therefore the main issue and focus of the association.

Within the newly organized women's movement in Ottoman Turkey - mainly the Osmanlı Műdafaa-ı Hukûk-ı Nisvan Cemiyeti and its organ, which also promoted unveiling - there were at this time an issue of debate on how the new woman would be dressed in Turkey after she discarded the traditional veiling. In the 1910s there were no formal law mandating veiling, and a minority of progressive Muslim women already dress in Western fashion and appeared unveiled, but this was controversial in practice and not seen as respectable by public opinion. The Sade Giyinen Hanımlar Cemiyeti argued, that it was possible for women to unveil without being immodest or disrespectful to religion.

The campaign of the organization was achieved after the fall of the Ottoman Empire a couple of years after the foundation of the Sade Giyinen Hanımlar Cemiyeti. After the foundation of the Republic of Turkey by Mustafa Kemal Atatürk in 1923. Mustafa Kemal (Atatürk) had the ambition to transform Turkey into a new modern secular state. In 1925, the Turkish government introduced a new Family Law modelled after the Swiss Family Law, and in the same year, it banned Mahmud II's reformation hat for men to be Westernise, the fez. Mustafa Kemal viewed modern clothing as an essential visual symbol of the new secular nation and encouraged both women and men to wear modern fashion, but in contrast to his law against traditional wear for men, he never introduced a ban against the hijab. The modernization reform program of Mustafa Kemal Pasha in Turkey abolished sex segregation and encouraged women to unveil as a part of a social revolution in order to make Turkey a modern state. He appeared in public with his wife Latife Uşaki unveiled, and arranged formal state receptions with dinner and dance where men and women could mingle, to encourage women to leave seclusion and adopt modern clothing, and from the mid-1920s, upper- and middle class Turkish women started to appear unveiled in public.

== See also ==
- Kanoun-e-Banovan
