= Kocapınar, Gönen =

Village in Turkey

Kocapınar
- Neighbourhood
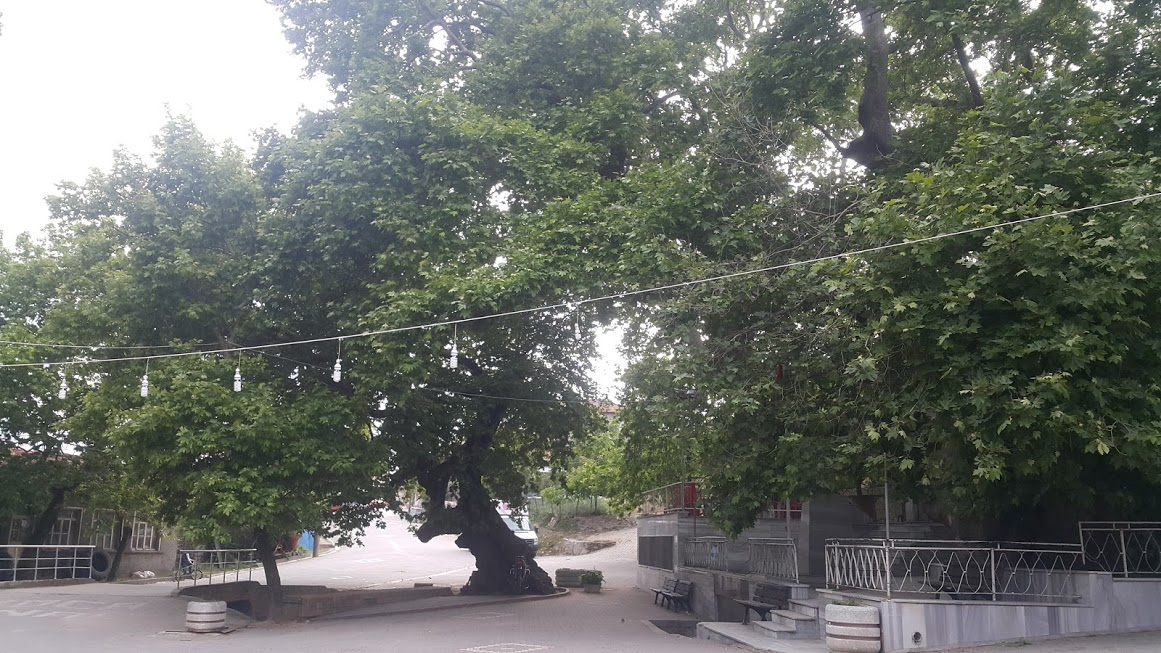

- Location within Turkey Location within Marmara
- Coordinates: 39.968°N 27.716°E
- Country: Turkey
- Province: Balıkesir
- District: Gönen
- Population (2022): 410
- Time zone: UTC+3 (TRT)

Kocapınar is a neighbourhood in the municipality and district of Gönen, Balıkesir Province in Turkey. Its population is 410 (2022).
