= Çalıca, Gönen =

Village in Turkey

Çalıca
- Neighbourhood
- Location in Turkey Çalıca (Marmara)
- Coordinates: 39.982°N 27.747°E
- Country: Turkey
- Province: Balıkesir
- District: Gönen
- Population (2022): 89
- Time zone: UTC+3 (TRT)

Çalıca is a neighbourhood in the municipality and district of Gönen, Balıkesir Province in Turkey. Its population is 89 (2022).
