= Akçapınar, Gönen =

Village in Turkey

Akçapınar
- Neighbourhood
- Location in Turkey Akçapınar (Marmara)
- Coordinates: 40°06′49″N 27°35′04″E
- Country: Turkey
- Province: Balıkesir
- District: Gönen
- Population (2022): 127
- Time zone: UTC+3 (TRT)

Akçapınar is a neighbourhood in the municipality and district of Gönen, Balıkesir Province in Turkey. Its population is 127 (2022).
