= Nuriye Ulviye Mevlan Civelek =

Turkish suffragist and journalist (1893–1964)

- Born: Nuriye Ulviye Yediç; 1893; Hacıvelioba, Gönen, Ottoman Empire
- Died: 9 April 1964 (aged 70–71); Kırıkhan, Hatay Province, Turkey
- Other names: Nuriye Ulviye, Nuriye Ulviye Bey, Ulviye Mevlan, Nuriye Ulviye Civelek, Ulviye Civelek, Nuriye Ulviye Mevlan Civelek
- Occupations: Journalist, women's rights activist
- Years active: 1913–1964
- Known for: establishing the first Muslim women's organization in Ottoman Turkey
- Spouses: Hulusi Bey (m. 1906) Mevlanzade Rifat Bey (m. 1913, div. 1923) Ali Civelek (m. 1925)

Nuriye Ulviye Mevlan Civelek (1893 – 9 April 1964) was a Turkish women's rights advocate, suffragist, journalist and founder of the first feminist women's magazine and Muslim women's rights organization in Turkey. The magazine was the first to publish a photograph of a Muslim woman.

== Early life ==
Nuriye Ulviye Yediç was born in 1893 to Safiye Hanım and Mahmut Yediç probably in Hacıvelioba, Gönen, Ottoman Empire, though some sources give her birthplace as Syria and others indicate it was in central Turkey in Göreme. Her father was a farmer and was of Circassian heritage having been forced to leave the North Caucasus after the conquest of Circassia by the Russian Empire. Due to financial setbacks, the family was living in impoverished conditions and sent their daughter to live at the Yıldız Palace at the age of six. She was raised there and received instruction on proper behavior, palace rules and religion. As was customary, she was married at age thirteen in 1906. Her husband, Hulusi Bey, was a foster brother of the sultan and died soon after the marriage.

== Career ==
Using money she inherited, Bey founded the magazine Women's World (Turkish: Kadınlar Dünyası) using the name Nuriye Ulviye on 4 April 1913. Within the next month, on May 28, 1913, she founded the Ottoman Society for the Defense of Women’s Rights (Turkish: Osmanlı Müdâfaa-i Hukuk-ı Nisvan Cemiyeti), with the aim to improve women's education and employment opportunities and reform dress codes. Though the association was primarily an organization of Muslim women, there were ethnic minority members as well as European journalists.

In the beginning, the magazine was published daily. After 100 issues, she began publishing it on a weekly basis and after the 108th issue (probably around 7 September 1913) she began signing her articles as Ulviye Mevlan, having taken the surname of her new husband, Rıfat Mevlan (also sometimes shown as Mevlanzâde Rıfat Bey), a journalist and politician. The journal was the first magazine to publish the photograph of a Muslim woman. None of the staff nor writers were male; Mevlan excluded men because men excluded women from legal participation in society.

"I kept on thinking about how we could make changes in our submissive and useless lives. To move forwards I believe both practical and spiritual courage are necessary. We are now in an age of reform and enlightenment. I knew that to advance in society, we had to develop a modern personality, mind and soul. In this age of awakening, and with a new society based on advances in the social sciences, I decided to publish a magazine that would encourage women to take the necessary developmental steps."

— Nuriye Ulviye with the signature of Kadınlar Dünyası, "Terakkiye Doğru", Kadınlar Dünyası, 1913, no. 5, pp. 2–3.

In her articles, Mevlan elucidated clear goals including women' right to higher education, equal pay for women and admission of women to civil service posts, and reiterated the theme that improvement in women's lives would also improve men's lives. She also argued that women should be able to wear a headscarf instead of the veil, should have equal rights within marriage, and condemned the practice of arranged marriage. As a result of her campaigns, women gained some significant successes, as in 1913 seven women were hired at the telephone office and in 1914, İnâs Darülfünunu a woman's university offering courses in sciences and literature was opened in Istanbul. From 1913 to 1914, Women’s World, also published a French edition aimed at increasing dialogue between European feminists and Association members.

Mevlan operated Women's World until 1921. At that time the Turkish War of Independence was being waged and Mevlan's husband, as a supporter of Kurdish independence would be deported as one of the 150 personae non gratae of Turkey in 1923. In 1927, Mevlan divorced and began operating a boarding house for students. In 1931, she married a medical student, Ali Muharrem Civelek, from Antioch who had housed with her during his studies at the Faculty of Medicine. Upon completion of his studies, the couple left Istanbul and relocated to Kırıkhan.

Civelek died on 9 April 1964 in Kırıkhan, Hatay Province, Turkey and was buried in Asri Cemetery in Antakya, Hatay Province, Turkey.

== Legacy ==
After her death, a public library bearing her name was established in 1967 by her husband. By 2004, the library housed over 9,000 books. There is also a street in Kırıkhan which bears her name and in the cemetery where she was buried, her husband installed a fountain to her memory. In 1967, in the same cemetery, the Turkish Women's Council (Turkish: Türkiye Kadınlar Konseyi) dedicated a commemorative plaque in her name.
