= Armutlu, Gönen =

Village in Turkey

Armutlu
- Neighbourhood
- Location in Turkey Armutlu (Marmara)
- Coordinates: 40.190°N 27.531°E
- Country: Turkey
- Province: Balıkesir
- District: Gönen
- Population (2022): 109
- Time zone: UTC+3 (TRT)

Armutlu is a neighbourhood in the municipality and district of Gönen, Balıkesir Province in Turkey. Its population is 109 (2022).
