= Dereköy, Gönen =

Village in Turkey

Dereköy
- Neighbourhood
- Location in Turkey Dereköy (Marmara)
- Coordinates: 40.167°N 27.590°E
- Country: Turkey
- Province: Balıkesir
- District: Gönen
- Population (2022): 165
- Time zone: UTC+3 (TRT)

Dereköy is a neighbourhood in the municipality and district of Gönen, Balıkesir Province in Turkey. Its population is 165 (2022).
