= Çifteçeşmeler, Gönen =

Village in Turkey

Çifteçeşmeler
- Neighbourhood
- Location in Turkey Çifteçeşmeler (Marmara)
- Coordinates: 40°16′17″N 27°33′05″E
- Country: Turkey
- Province: Balıkesir
- District: Gönen
- Population (2022): 302
- Time zone: UTC+3 (TRT)

Çifteçeşmeler is a neighbourhood in the municipality and district of Gönen, Balıkesir Province in Turkey. Its population is 302 (2022).
