= Geyikli, Gönen =

Village in Turkey

Geyikli
- Neighbourhood
- Location in Turkey Geyikli (Marmara)
- Coordinates: 40.176°N 27.483°E
- Country: Turkey
- Province: Balıkesir
- District: Gönen
- Population (2022): 180
- Time zone: UTC+3 (TRT)

Geyikli is a neighbourhood in the municipality and district of Gönen, Balıkesir Province in Turkey. Its population is 180 (2022).
