= Hasanbey, Gönen =

Village in Turkey

Hasanbey
- Neighbourhood
- Location in Turkey Hasanbey (Marmara)
- Coordinates: 40.130°N 27.643°E
- Country: Turkey
- Province: Balıkesir
- District: Gönen
- Population (2022): 1,436
- Time zone: UTC+3 (TRT)

Hasanbey is a neighbourhood in the municipality and district of Gönen, Balıkesir Province in Turkey. Its population is 1,436 (2022).
