= Bayramiç, Gönen =

Village in Turkey

Bayramiç
- Neighbourhood
- Location in Turkey Bayramiç (Marmara)
- Coordinates: 40.112°N 27.812°E
- Country: Turkey
- Province: Balıkesir
- District: Gönen
- Population (2022): 194
- Time zone: UTC+3 (TRT)

Bayramiç is a neighbourhood in the municipality and district of Gönen, Balıkesir Province in Turkey. Its population is 194 (2022).
