= Dişbudak, Gönen =

Village in Turkey

Dişbudak
- Neighbourhood
- Location in Turkey Dişbudak (Marmara)
- Coordinates: 40.246°N 27.522°E
- Country: Turkey
- Province: Balıkesir
- District: Gönen
- Population (2022): 129
- Time zone: UTC+3 (TRT)

Dişbudak is a neighbourhood in the municipality and district of Gönen, Balıkesir Province in Turkey. Its population is 129 (2022).
