= Hasanbey Zardabi Natural History Museum =

- Established: 1930
- Location: Baku, Azerbaijan
- Type: Natural history museum

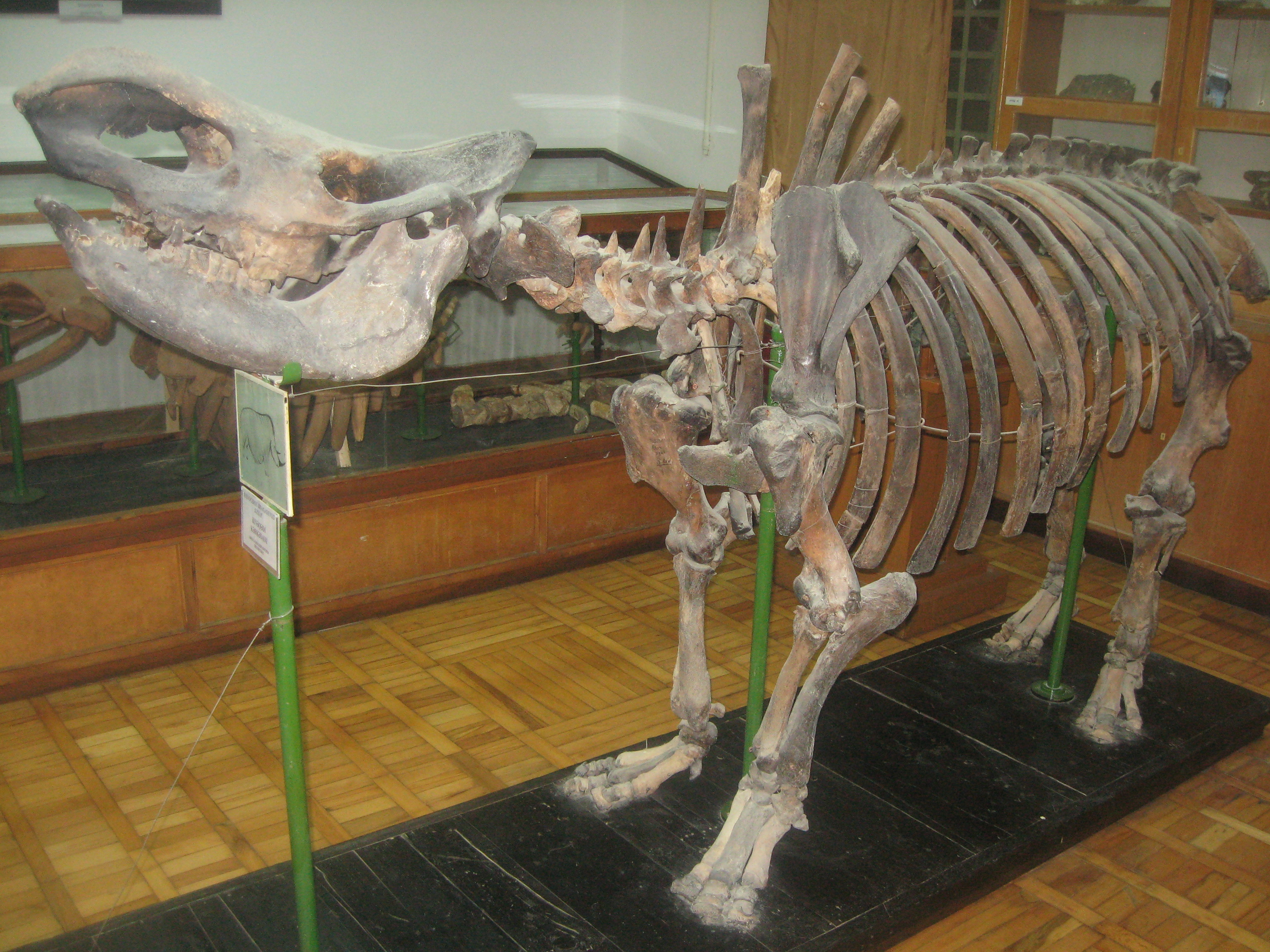
Skeleton of Rhinoceros binagadensis (Pleistocene), which was found in Binagadi Tar Pit (north western Baku). Natural History Museum named after Hasanbey Zardabi. Baku, Azerbaijan

The Hasanbey Zardabi Natural History Museum (Azerbaijani: Həsən bəy Zərdabi adına Təbiət Tarixi Muzeyi) is a natural history museum in Baku, Azerbaijan. The museum bears the name of Hasan bey Zardabi, an Azerbaijani journalist and intellectual, and founder of the first Azeri-language newspaper Akinchi ("The Ploughman") in 1875. The museum operates under the auspices of the Institute of Geology and Geophysics of Azerbaijan.

== Structure ==
The museum has two departments: a geology department that has samples of metallic and nonmetallic natural resources and minerals and rocks of Azerbaijan and a zoology department. The general collection of the museum numbers more than 1400 different items. The biological department exhibits numerous skeletons and fragments of animal bones found during field work and treated by researchers.

== Research ==
The research activities of the Natural History Museum have developed in several directions, focused especially on paleontological sites. The main research focuses on the study of the Binagadi quaternary and the Eldar late Sarmatian hipparion faunas, Pirekishkuli Maykop vertebrate fauna, numerous sites of primitive people, as well as Azokh cave and others.

== Collections ==
In the collection of the quaternary fauna of Binagadi, there are 41 species of mammals, 110 species of birds, 2 reptiles, 1 amphibian, 107 insects and 22 species of plants. Among those are near-complete fossilized skeletons of horses, deer, gazelles and saigas that don't live in the territory of Azerbaijan anymore. The oldest exhibit is the teeth of an ichthyosaur from the Cretaceous period, more than 120 million years old. The Eldar fauna consists of 23 representatives of various forms of vertebrate animals. In addition, the museum also has two types of hipparions (mammals of the horse family), the Sarmatian whale and the lower jaw of a mastodon. The museum also exhibits the upper jaw, teeth and tusks of the Southern Mammoth which lived in the country, 600000 years ago and was discovered in Mingachevir in 2001. The museum also contains the mounted specimen and skeleton of the only Persian Leopard recorded in the Absheron Peninsula, killed by locals in 1945.

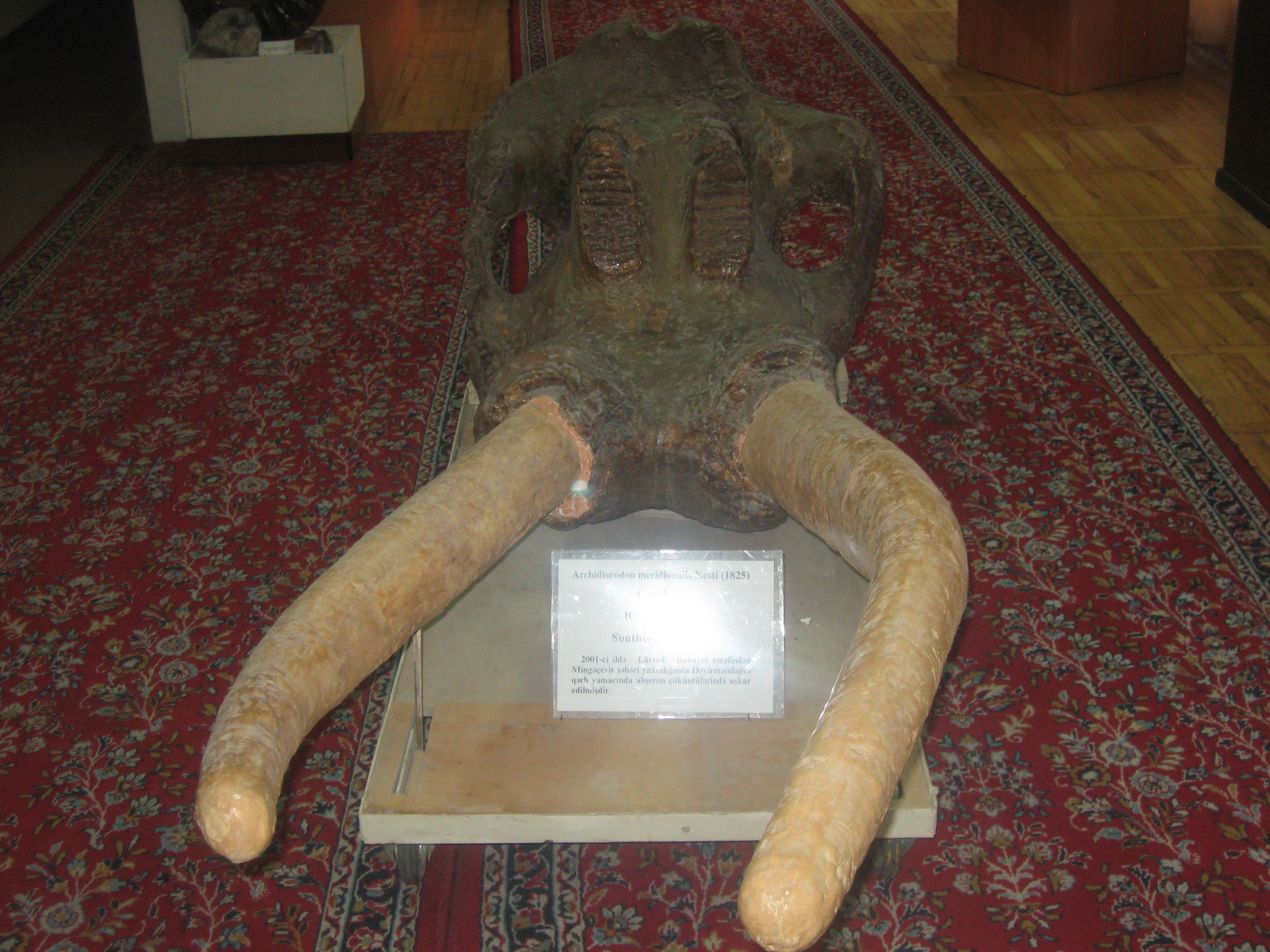
Skull of Southern elephant (Archiodiscodon meridionalis Nesti) in Natural History Museum named after Hasanbey Zardabi. Baku, Azerbaijan. The skeleton of this elephant was found by Lutfali Babayev in 2001 near Mingachevir town, on western slope of Dayirmandag mountain.

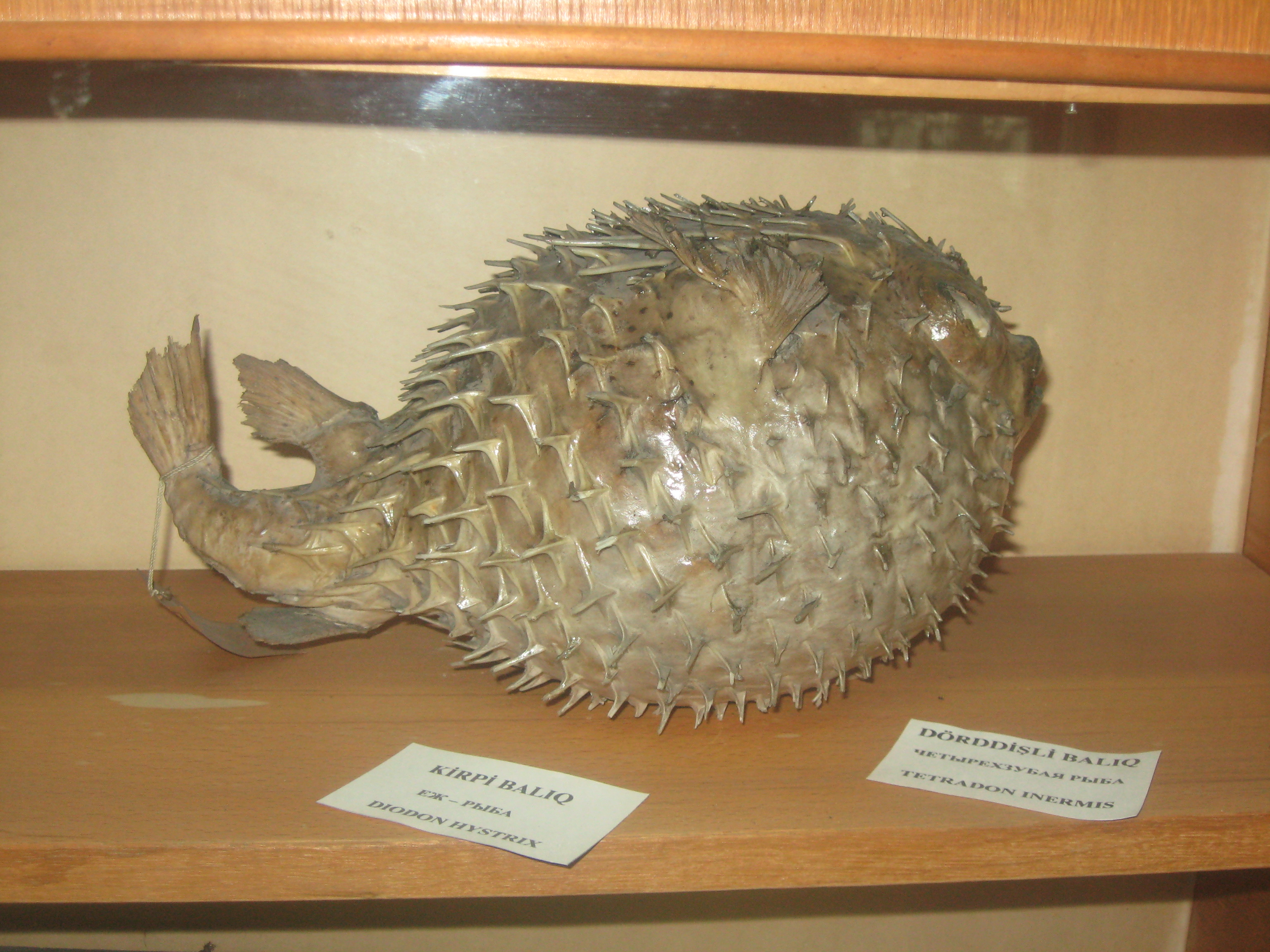
A mounted Diodon hystrix. Natural History Museum named after Hasanbey Zardabi. Baku, Azerbaijan
