= Hacıvelioba, Gönen =

Village in Turkey

Hacıvelioba
- Neighbourhood
- Location in Turkey Hacıvelioba (Marmara)
- Coordinates: 40°02′55″N 27°38′52″E
- Country: Turkey
- Province: Balıkesir
- District: Gönen
- Population (2022): 239
- Time zone: UTC+3 (TRT)

Hacıvelioba is a neighbourhood in the municipality and district of Gönen, Balıkesir Province in Turkey. Its population is 239 (2022).
