= Mevlanzade Rifat Bey =

Ottoman Kurdish journalist and poet

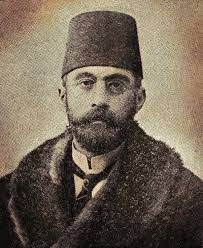
Mevlanzade Rifat Bey

Mevlanzade Rifat Bey (1869 in Constantinople – 1930 in Sulaymaniyah), was an Ottoman Kurdish journalist and poet.

== Early life and family ==
Mevlanzade's grandfather was called Mehmed Bey. he was one of the notable personages of Sulaymaniyah and descended from Khâlid-i Shahrazuri. Mevlanzade's father was Abdurrahman Nacim Efendi who was born in the Şehrizor district of Sulaymaniyah, Abdurrahman entered into the Ottoman civil service and became head of Diyarbakır Province Court and later head of the Beirut Court of Appeals, he was also a poet and died in Harpoot in 1895. Mevlanzade's wife was Nuriye Ulviye Mevlan Civelek.

== Journalism and exile ==
Mevlanzade Rifat Bey was one of the most notable and widely read journalists of the Ottoman Empire. He was the owner and editor in chief of Serbestî and friend of the slain journalist Hasan Fehmi. Due to his opposition to the Ottoman government, he spent most of his life in exile including France, Yemen, Egypt, Syria and Greece. An opponent of Abdul Hamid II, he was initially a member of the Young Turk central committee but later one of its most ardent critics and later a member of the Freedom and Accord Party. He was among the few public figures in the Ottoman state who condemned CUP policies against the Armenians, noting that the deportations carried out were systematically planned by the Young Turks as a means to solving the Armenian question by genocide.

Mevlanzade also opposed Mustafa Kemal Atatürk; he travelled to Iraq in October 1921, supplied with Greek funds, to prepare for a Kurdish revolt against the Kemalists. He was named as one of the 150 personae non gratae of Turkey.

He was an opponent in three different periods, firstly against Abdul Hamid II, secondly against the Committee of Union and Progress led by Enver Pasha and thirdly against Mustafa Kemal Atatürk.

== Kurdish nationalism ==
He extensively lobbied the British, French and Greeks for support in establishing an independent Kurdistan. He met with Dimitrios Gounaris to this end. Mevlanzade was also a prominent member of the Society for the Elevation of Kurdistan, and defended the Fourteen Points by Woodrow Wilson, according to which the rights of all nationalities within the Ottoman Empire are to be considered. He continued to advocate for the establishment of an independent Kurdish nation (Kurdistan) to serve as a homeland for the Kurds.

Mevlanzade Rifat also acted as the liaison between the Kurds in Khoybun and the Armenians. He was close friend of Celadet Bedir Khan and Süreyya Bedir Khan whose articles he published.

He was the official spokesman of the Society for the Elevation of Kurdistan president Abdulkadir Ubeydullah.
