= Hasan Fehmi (journalist) =

Ottoman journalist

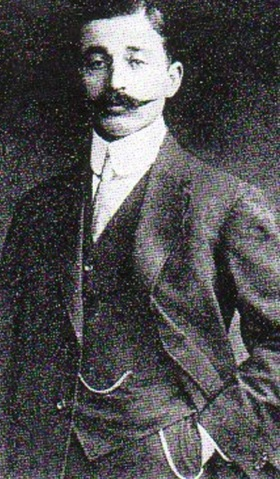
- Born: 1874
- Died: April 7, 1909 (aged 34–35); Istanbul, Turkey
- Occupation: editor-in-chief of Serbestî

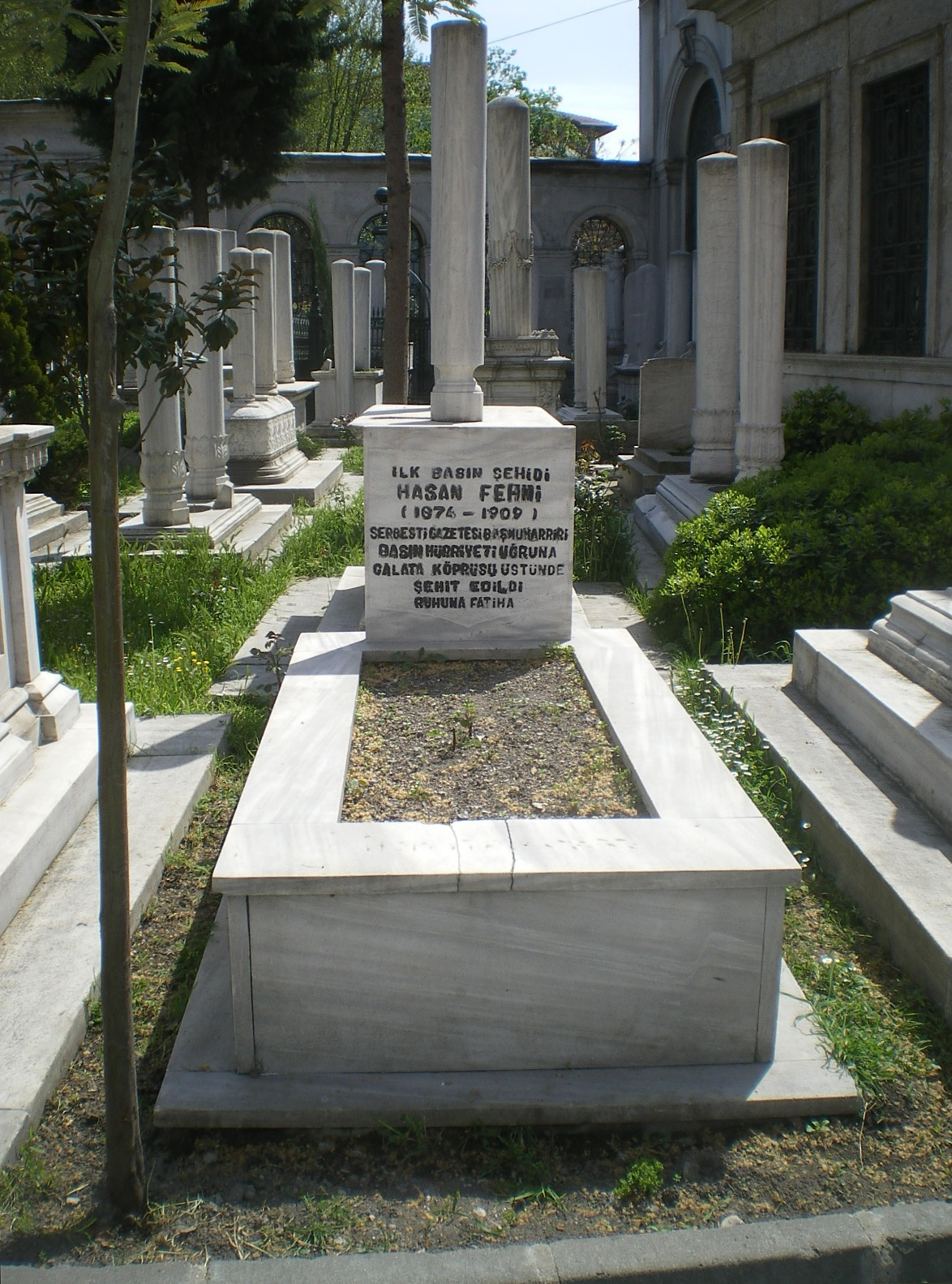
The grave of Hasan Fehmi

Hasan Fehmi Bey (1874 – April 7, 1909) was an Ottoman journalist, who was the editor-in-chief of Serbestî, an Ottoman newspaper owned by Mevlanzade Rifat Bey, in which he wrote articles against the newly emerging Committee of Union and Progress (CUP).

Serbestî was an anti-CUP daily newspaper owned by the brother of the sultan. In March 1909, the paper published a series of articles critical of the CUP. On April 7, 1909, Fehmi was murdered by unidentified assailants as he was crossing the Galata Bridge in Istanbul with his friend Şakir Bey, a deposed subgovernor. Şakir survived his injuries. On April 8, the front page of Serbestî contained a single line invoking the Al-Fatiha for Fehmi's soul.

The situation in Constantinople deteriorated rapidly. The opposing Liberal Party accused the CUP of having Fehmi murdered; others claimed the real perpetrator was from the palace. The Volkan daily newspaper openly accused the CUP of being responsible for Fehmi's murder.

== Legacy ==
Fehmi's funeral was attended by more than 50,000 people and quickly turned into a mass, anti-CUP demonstration. It is largely accepted that Fehmi's murder in 1909, the murder of editor Ahmet Samim 1910, journalist Zeki Bey in 1911, and the attempted murder of Hüseyin Cahit Yalçın during the 31 March incident were all connected to their criticism of the CUP.

He was buried at the tomb (türbe) of Sultan Mahmud II on Divan Yolu Caddesi in Istanbul.
