= Alaettin, Gönen =

Village in Turkey

Alaettin
- Neighbourhood
- Location in Turkey Alaettin (Marmara)
- Coordinates: 40.185°N 27.691°E
- Country: Turkey
- Province: Balıkesir
- District: Gönen
- Population (2022): 237
- Time zone: UTC+3 (TRT)

Alaettin is a neighbourhood in the municipality and district of Gönen, Balıkesir Province in Turkey. Its population is 237 (2022).
