= Alaettin Tahir =

Alahettin Tahir
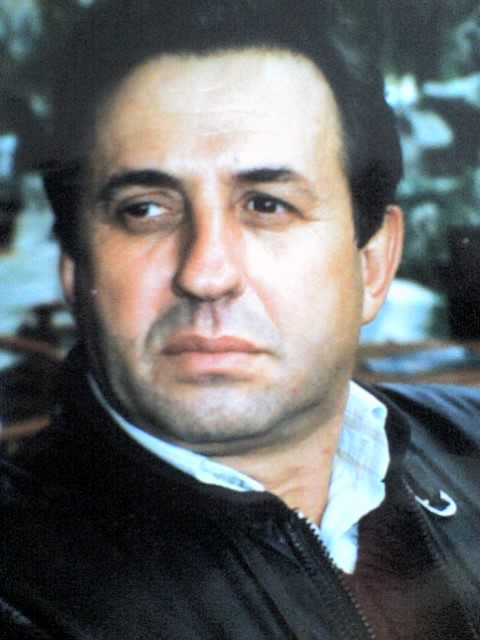
- Born: April 23, 1949; Skopje, Republic of Macedonia
- Died: January 28, 2004; Skopje, Republic of Macedonia
- Occupations: Author, journalist

Alahettin Tahir (Macedonian: Алаетин Тахир, Skopje, Republic of Macedonia, April 23, 1949 – Skopje, January 28, 2004) is a well-known Macedonian author, researcher and journalist of Turkish descent.

Tahir studied philosophy at the University of Skopje, after graduating from high school in Skopje. In 1969, he was given the post secretary of the monthly magazine Sesler (Sounds), published in Turkish language in Skopje. Later he worked as a journalist and editor of the culture section of the newspaper Birlik (Unity), published also in Turkish in Skopje. Tahir in the late 1970s began to work at the Turkish Language Department of Skopje Television (now Macedonian Television). He died on 28 January 2004 in his hometown, Skopje.

== Bibliography ==
- Apartment 18 (short stories, 1972)
- Portrait (short stories, 1980)

== Awards ==
- Award for short story of the newspaper Birlik
- Award for short story of the newspaper Tan
- Award for short story of the magazine Cevren
