= Serbestî =

Newspaper in the Ottoman Empire

Serbestî

Serbestî (Ottoman Turkish for "Liberty") was an Ottoman newspaper. It was founded in 1908 by Mevlanzade Rifat Bey, who in 1924 would become one of the 150 personae non gratae of the newly established Republic of Turkey, because the paper and its founder had an oppositional and hostile stance to the independence movement led by Mustafa Kemal.

The paper opposed the progressive Committee of Union and Progress (CUP), which was coming into power at the time of its founding. The editor-in-chief of Serbestî, Hasan Fehmi Bey, was murdered on 6 April 1909 by unknown assailants. Following this incident Mevlanzade Rifat Bey left Istanbul and settled in Paris where he published Serbestî for a short period. Next he went to Egypt and published the paper there until February 1910 when it was banned. Following his return to the Ottoman Empire he resumed the publication of Serbestî in İstanbul on 12 July 1912. However, it was banned by the Ottoman authorities in September 1912. The paper was restarted later and published until 1923 with some interruptions.
