= Volkan (newspaper) =

Daily newspaper in the Ottoman Empire (1908–1909)

- Type: Daily newspaper
- Founder: Derviş Vahdeti
- Editor-in-chief: Derviş Vahdeti
- Founded: 11 December 1908
- Ceased publication: 20 April 1909
- Political alignment: Pan-Islamist
- Language: Ottoman Turkish
- Headquarters: Constantinople

Volkan (Ottoman Turkish: وولقان) was a short-lived daily newspaper published in Constantinople, Ottoman Empire. The paper was in circulation between 1908 and 1909 and was one of the Islamist publications which were launched in the Second Constitutional period.

== History and profile ==
Volkan was started by Derviş Vahdeti in Constantinople on 11 December 1908. Vahdeti asked for financial support from Sultan Abdulhamit before launching the paper. However, this request was not accepted.

The publisher of Volkan was Derviş Vahdeti. He edited the daily until 20 April 1909 when he was arrested. At the beginning the paper was supportive of the new constitution and relatively liberal. However, following the establishment of the Mohammadan Union by Vahdeti on 5 March 1909 the paper became its organ and an ardent critic of the Committee of Union and Progress (CUP). The political program of the Union was featured in the paper on 3 March.

Volkan published the articles by Said Nursî, future leader of the Nur movement. The paper began to feature articles in a militant style over time. It presented a synthesis of mysticism and popular Islam and opposed to the secularism of the government. It also criticized the influence of the minorities and foreign representatives in the Empire. Vahdeti argued in Volkan that the CUP should obey the Islamic principles. The paper also featured anti-Semitic materials written by Derviş Vahdeti and other contributors. All these were in sharp contrast to the ideology of the CUP making the paper a device for the counterrevolution. On 12 April 1909, eight days before its closure, Volkan made a call for a riot against the CUP rule arguing that the CUP leaders should leave the country. The paper produced a total of 110 issues during its run.

=== Spin-offs ===
In the 1940s a magazine with same name was published in Istanbul which shared the political stance of the paper.
