= Ottoman entry into World War I =

Entrance of the Ottoman Empire into the First World War

The Ottoman Empire's entry into World War I began on 29 October 1914 when two recently purchased ships of its navy, which were still crewed by German sailors and commanded by their German admiral, carried out the Black Sea Raid, a surprise attack against Russian ports. Russia replied by declaring war on 1 November 1914. (Note: Russia still used the Julian calendar so the declaration was dated 20 October 1914 O.S.) Russia's allies, Britain and France, declared war on the Ottoman Empire on 5 November 1914. The reasons for the Ottoman action were not immediately clear. The Ottoman government had declared neutrality in the war and negotiations with both sides were underway.

The decision would ultimately lead to the deaths of hundreds of thousands of Ottoman citizens, the Armenian genocide, the dissolution of the empire, and the abolition of the Ottoman Caliphate.

== Background ==
In the early 20th century, the Ottoman Empire had a reputation as the "sick man of Europe" after a century of slow relative decline. The Ottomans were weakened by political instability, military defeat, civil strife and uprisings by national minorities.

The economic resources of the Ottoman Empire were depleted by the cost of the First Balkan War in 1912 and Second Balkan War in 1913. The French, British, and Germans had offered financial aid. A pro-German faction, which was influenced by the former Ottoman military attaché in Berlin Enver Pasha, opposed the pro-British majority in the Ottoman cabinet and tried to secure closer relations with Germany. In December 1913, the Germans sent General Otto Liman von Sanders and a military mission to Constantinople. The geographical position of the Ottoman Empire meant that Russia, France, and Britain had a mutual interest in the Ottomans's neutrality in a European war.

In 1908, the Young Turks seized power in Constantinople and installed Sultan Mehmed V as a figurehead in 1909. The new regime implemented a program of reform to modernise the Ottoman political and economic system and to redefine its racial character. The Young Turks restored the Ottoman constitution of 1876 and reconvened the Ottoman parliament, which effectively started the Second Constitutional Era. The Young Turk movement members, which was once underground, established declared political parties. Among them were major parties the Committee of Union and Progress (CUP) and the Freedom and Accord Party, also known as the Liberal Union or Liberal Entente (LU). A general election was held in October and November 1908 in which the CUP became the majority party.

Germany, an enthusiastic supporter of the new regime, provided investment capital. German diplomats gained influence and German officers assisted in training and re-equipping the Ottoman Army, but Britain remained the predominant power in the region.

The Ottoman Army faced many challenges including the Italo-Turkish War in 1911, the Balkan Wars from 1912 to 1913, unrest on the periphery such as in the Yemen Vilayet and the Hauran Druze Rebellion, and continuous political unrest in the empire such as the 31 March Incident and coups in 1912 and 1913. At the onset of the First World War, the Ottoman Army had already been involved in continuous fighting for three years.

The international political climate in the early 20th century was a multipolar one, with no single or two states pre-eminent. Multipolarity had traditionally afforded the Ottomans the ability to play off one power against the others, which occurred several times with consummate skill, according to the author Michael Reynolds. Germany had supported Abdul Hamid II's regime and acquired a strong foothold. Initially, the newly-formed CUP and LU turned to Britain. The Ottomans hoped to break France and Germany's hold and acquire greater autonomy for the Porte by encouraging Britain to compete against Germany and France.

Hostility toward Germany increased when its ally Austria-Hungary annexed Bosnia and Herzegovina in 1908. The pro-CUP Tanin went so far as to suggest that Vienna's motive in carrying out this act was to strike a blow against the constitutional regime and provoke a reaction to bring about its fall. Two prominent CUP members, Ahmed Riza and Dr. Nazim, were sent to London to discuss the possibility of cooperation with Sir Edward Grey, the British Foreign Secretary, and Sir Charles Hardinge, a senior Foreign Office official.

Our habit was to keep our hands free, though we made ententes and friendships. It was true that we had an alliance with Japan, but it was limited to certain distant questions in the Far East. (Note: Regarding the alliance's provisions for mutual defense, it was aimed for Japan to enter the First World War on the British side.)
The [Ottoman delegate] replied that Empire was the Japan of the Near East (alluding to Meiji Restoration period which spanned from 1868 to 1912), and that we already had the Cyprus Convention which was still in force.
I said that they had our entire sympathy in the good work they were doing in the Empire; we wished them well, and we would help them in their internal affairs by lending them men to organise customs, police, and so forth, if they wished them.

— Edward Grey, 1st Viscount Grey of Fallodon

In early 1914, in the aftermath of the Balkan Wars, the CUP became convinced that only an alliance with Britain and the Entente could guarantee the survival of what remained of the empire. Sir Louis du Pan Mallet who became Britain's Ambassador to the Porte in 1914, noted:

Turkey's way of assuring her independence is by an alliance with us or by an undertaking with the Triple Entente. A less risky method would be by a treaty or Declaration binding all the Powers to respect the independence and integrity of the present Turkish dominion, which might go as far as neutralization, and participation by all the Great Powers in financial control and the application of reform.

— Sir Louis du Pan Mallet

The CUP would not accept such proposals since it felt betrayed by what it considered was the European Powers' bias against the Ottomans during the Balkan Wars and so it had no faith in Great Power declarations regarding the empire's independence and integrity. The termination of European financial control and administrative supervision was one of the principal aims of CUP's movement. Ambassador Mallet seemed totally oblivious to this.

=== Russian position ===
Russia's expanding economy was quickly becoming dependent on the Ottoman Straits for exports. A quarter of Russian products passed through the Straits. Control of the Straits and Constantinople were high priorities for Russian diplomatic and military planning. During the public disorders of the Young Turk Revolution and 31 March Incident, Russia considered landing troops in Constantinople. In May 1913, the German military mission assigned Otto Liman von Sanders to help train and reorganize the Ottoman army. That was intolerable for the Russians, and Russia developed a plan for invading and occupying either the Black Sea port of Trabzon or the eastern Anatolian town of Bayezid in retaliation. Russia could not find a military solution for a full invasion, which the small occupation might become.

As there was to be no solution by the naval occupation of Constantinople, the next option was to improve the Russian Caucasian Army. In supporting its army, Russia established local links to regional groups within the Empire. It resolved that the army and navy, as well as the ministries of finance, trade and industry, would work together to solve the transport problem, achieve naval supremacy, and increase the number of men and artillery pieces assigned to amphibious operations. Russian Army would need to carry out these operations during mobilisation. They also attempted to expand Russia's Caucasian rail network toward the Ottoman Empire. Russia demanded the implementation of an Armenian reform package.

=== German position ===
More than any other country, Germany had been paying favourable attention to the Ottoman Empire in preceding decades. There was collaboration in terms of finance, trade, railroads, and military advice. In 1913, German General Liman von Sanders started working to modernise the Ottoman Army. When the war began, he was given command of the defence of Gallipoli, which was a defeat for the Allies.

Germany had harboured imperial ambitions since 1890, which had not been successful. By 1909, it became clear that the Germans would not prevail in the Anglo-German naval arms race. Even with its technological superiority, Germany's energy infrastructure was unable to support battleships in distant waters. Germany was weak relative to the other European colonial powers and sought a strategic alliance with the Ottomans. The Baghdad Railway would have advanced Germany's imperial ambitions, including the settlement of Germans in Anatolia, and given the Germans greater flexibility in transporting their troops to the Persian Gulf and then to British India. As soon as the railway was proposed, it became a point of tension between the Germans and the British. The latter considered southern Persia to be within their sphere of influence, and that German influence should not have been projected there.

However, in June 1914, Berlin agreed not to construct the line south of Baghdad. They also agreed to recognise Britain's preponderant interest in the region. The issue was resolved to the satisfaction of both sides and did not play a role in causing the war.

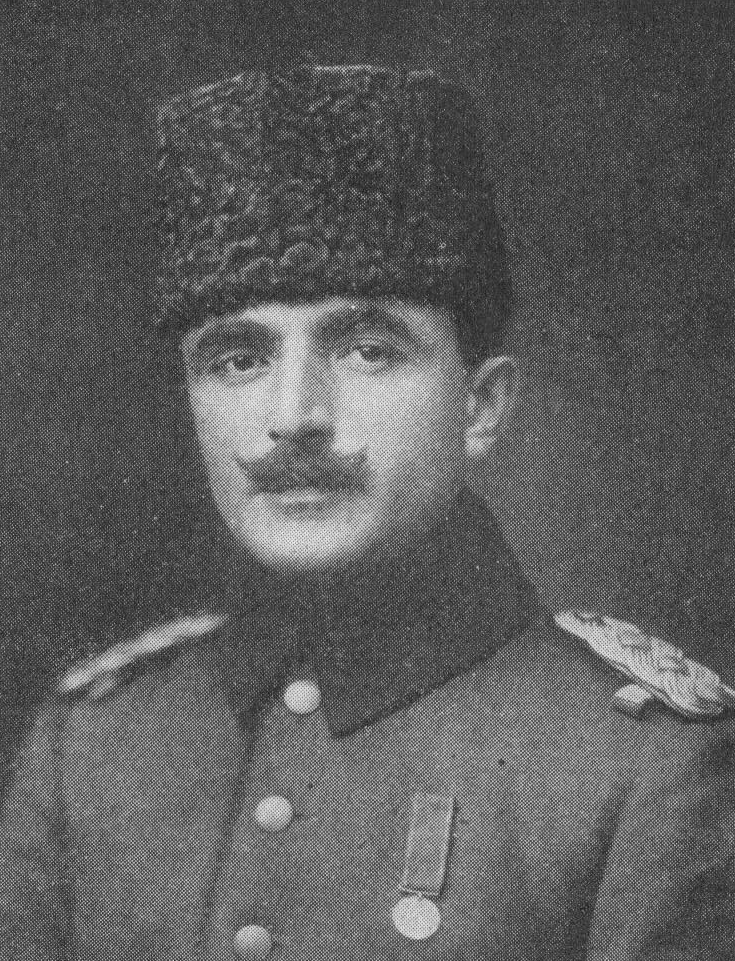
Enver Bey, later Enver Pasha, Ottoman Minister of War

== Alliances ==
During the July Crisis over the murder of Archduke Franz Ferdinand in 1914, German diplomats offered the Ottomans an anti-Russian alliance and territorial gains in Caucasia, north-western Iran and Trans-Caspia. The pro-British faction in the cabinet was isolated because the British ambassador had taken leave until 18 August. As the crisis deepened in Europe, the Ottomans had a policy to obtain a guarantee of territorial integrity and other potential advantages. They were unaware that the British might enter a European war. On 30 July 1914, two days after the outbreak of the war in Europe, the Ottoman leaders agreed to form a secret Ottoman-German Alliance against Russia. The alliance did not require them to undertake military action.

On 22 July, Ottoman Minister of War Enver Pasha proposed an Ottoman–German alliance to Baron Hans Freiherr von Wangenheim, the German ambassador in Constantinople. Germany turned down the proposal since it considered the Ottomans as having nothing of value to offer. Grand Vizier Said Halim Pasha had made similar propositions to the Austro-Hungarian ambassador. Enver had been military attaché in Berlin from 1909 to 1911. Despite this his relations with the German military mission, mainly personal relation to Otto Liman von Sanders, were not good. He put his faith in his soldiers and army and deeply resented German military intervention. Neither diplomat accepted the proposals. Cemal Pasha was sent to Paris in July 1914 for the same purpose and returned to Constantinople with French military decorations but no alliance. Initially, the Ottoman government, especially Minister of State Talaat Pasha, had advocated siding with the British. The British declined the offer.

On 28 July 1914, Winston Churchill asked for the requisition of two modern warships being built by British shipyards for the Ottoman navy. They were Sultân Osmân-ı Evvel, which had been completed and was making preparations to leave, and Reşadiye. Despite questions about the legality of such a seizure, the request was granted at a Cabinet meeting on 31 July, together with an offer to the Ottomans to pay for the ships. On 2 August, the British requisitioned them, which alienated pro-British elements in Constantinople. Enver Pasha, knowing that the Ottomans would lose them, had offered to sell the ships to Germany in a renewed attempt at obtaining an alliance. After Enver's 22 July approach to Germany had been rejected, Kaiser Wilhelm II ordered for an alliance to be reconsidered. Renewed negotiations started on 28 July, involving Enver, Talaat and Said Halim Pasha. In the resulting secret defensive treaty, signed on 1 August, Germany undertook to defend the Ottomans' territory if it was threatened. The Ottomans would join with Germany if German treaty obligations with Austria-Hungary forced it into war but would not fight on Germany's side unless Bulgaria also did so.

The German government offered SMS Goeben and SMS Breslau to the Ottoman Navy as replacements to gain influence. The British pursuit of Goeben and Breslau failed when the Ottoman government opened the Dardanelles to allow them passage to Constantinople, despite being required under international law as a neutral party to block military shipping.

On 2 August 1914, the Ottoman Empire ordered general mobilisation but announced that it would remain neutral. The Ottoman authorities expected mobilisation to be complete within four weeks. Said Halim wanted to have time to see the development of events before any more engagements with Germany. He wanted to see the conclusion of the negotiations with Romania, Bulgaria and Greece. Said Halim took two decisions. Firstly, he directed the German ambassador not to interfere with military affairs and German commander General Liman von Sanders not to interfere with politics. Secondly, he directed negotiations to be reopened with the French and Russian ambassadors. On 9 August, Enver Pasha assigned von Sanders to the First Army. Russia interpreted the assignment as an improvement of the Strait defences. Instead, Sanders was cut from the high-level decision cycle by being in the First Army. In the middle of August, he officially requested to be released and return to Germany. He was surprised when his staff relayed the information regarding the Battle of Odessa.

On 3 August, the Ottoman government officially declared neutrality.

On 5 August, Enver informed the Russians that he was willing to reduce the number of troops along the Russian frontier and strengthen the garrison in East Thrace to prevent Bulgaria or Greece from considering joining the Central Powers. On 9 August, Said informed the Germans that Romania had approached Constantinople and Athens about forming a trilateral Ottoman–Greek–Romanian neutrality pact.

On 6 August 1914, at 1:00 am, Said Halim summoned the German ambassador to his office to inform him that the Cabinet had decided unanimously to open the Straits to the German battlecruiser Goeben and light cruiser Breslau, which were being pursued by ships of the Royal Navy, and to any Austro-Hungarian vessels accompanying them. Said then presented Wangenheim with six proposals, not conditions, which the ambassador immediately accepted and were signed later that day:

1. Support in abolishing the foreign capitulations.
2. Support in negotiating agreements with Romania and Bulgaria.
3. If any Ottoman territories were occupied by enemies of Germany during the course of the war, Germany would not make peace until they were evacuated.
4. If Greece entered the war and was defeated by the Ottoman Empire, the Aegean Islands would be returned to the Ottomans.
5. An adjustment to the Ottoman border in the Caucasus to bring it up to Muslim-inhabited Russian Azerbaijan.
6. A war indemnity.

The German government later approved the proposals since it appeared that they would come into play only if Germany was in a position to dictate terms at the peace conference.

Wangenheim, on the behalf of the German government, secretly purchased Ikdam, the empire's largest newspaper. Its new ownership began to abuse Britain, France, and Russia continuously as Islam's greatest enemies and reminded its readers that the German Emperor was the self-proclaimed "protector" of Islam. Increasingly large numbers of Germans, both civilians and soldiers, began to arrive in Constantinople. As American ambassador Henry Morgenthau, Sr. reported, they filled all the cafes and marched through the streets "in the small hours of the morning, howling and singing German patriotic songs" while German officers were "rushing through the streets every day in huge automobiles".

On 9 August 1914, following Said Halim Pasha's 2 August decision, Enver communicated with Russian Ambassador Mikhail Nikolayevich von Giers. The talks reached a point that Enver proposed an Ottoman-Russian Alliance that day. Historians have developed two positions on Enver's proposal. One group believes the proposal was a ruse to hide the German alliance. The other group believes Enver was acting along the decision of Said Halim, and they were still sincerely attempting to find a viable solution to keep the Ottomans out of war. It is clear that no Ottoman leaders were committed to war, but they were trying to maximise their options.

On 19 August 1914, an Ottoman–Bulgarian alliance was signed in Sofia during the opening month of the First World War, although both signatories were then neutral. Minister of the Interior Talaat Pasha and President Halil Bey of the Chamber of Deputies signed the treaty on behalf of the Ottoman Empire, and Prime Minister Vasil Radoslavov signed on behalf of the Kingdom of Bulgaria. The Ottoman Empire and Bulgaria showed sympathy to each other because they suffered as a result of the territories lost with the conclusion of the Balkan Wars. They also held bitter relations with Greece. It was natural and beneficial for them to work for the development of policies that enabled them to gain better positions within the region. The Ottoman–Bulgarian alliance may have been a prerequisite for Bulgaria joining the Central Powers after the Ottomans entered the war.

On 9 September 1914, the Porte unilaterally repealed the capitulations granted to foreign powers. The British, French, Russian, Italian, Austro-Hungarian and German ambassadors signed a joint note of protest, but the Austro-Hungarian and German ambassadors privately informed the Grand Vizier that they would not press the issue. On 1 October, the Ottoman government raised its customs duties, which had been controlled by the Ottoman Public Debt Administration, and closed all foreign post offices.

On 28 September, the Ottoman government closed the Turkish Straits to international shipping in defiance of the 1841 London Straits Convention regulating the use of the Straits. This caused an immense blow to the Russian economy since Straits were vital for Russian commerce and for communications between the Western Allies and Moscow.

On 2 October, the British cabinet decided to drop its century-long support for the Ottomans against Russian threats. The decision was that the Russian alliance was more important. The decision was made in order to keep Russia out of Prague, Vienna, Budapest, Belgrade, Bucharest and Sofia by giving it Constantinople after the Ottomans were defeated. Russia had always desired control of Constantinople and the Straits, primarily so that it could have free access to the Mediterranean Sea, and so it agreed to these terms in November.

== Entry ==
Ahmet Cemal Pasha, the navy minister and commander-in-chief of the Ottoman fleet, had close contact with the British through the British Military Mission to help the Ottomans to improve the Ottoman Navy. Admiral Arthur Limpus had headed the Mission from April 1912. Rear Admiral Wilhelm Anton Souchon commanded the Mediterranean squadron of the Imperial German Navy, consisting of the battlecruiser SMS Goeben and the light cruiser SMS Breslau. At the outbreak of war between Germany and Britain, elements of the British Mediterranean Fleet pursued the German ships, which evaded the British fleet and arrived at Messina in neutral Italy on 4 August 1914. The Italian authorities insisted on the Germans departing within 24 hours, as required by international law. Admiral Souchon learned that Austria-Hungary would provide no naval aid in the Mediterranean and that the Ottoman Empire was still neutral and that therefore he should no longer make for Constantinople. Souchon chose to head for Constantinople anyway.

On 6 August 1914, at 1:00 am, Grand Vizier Said Halim Pasha summoned the German ambassador to his office to inform him that the Cabinet had decided unanimously to open the Straits to Goeben and Breslau and to any Austro-Hungarian vessels accompanying them.

On 9 August, the Grand Vizier requested for the Goeben to be transferred to Ottoman control "by means of a fictitious sale", but the German government in Berlin refused. On the afternoon of 10 August, before any agreement had been reached, the German ships reached the entry of the Dardanelles and Enver authorised their admittance into the Straits. The Vizier objected that the presence of the ships was premature and could trigger an Entente declaration of war before the necessary agreement with Bulgaria had been reached. He renewed his request for a fictitious sale.

On 11 August 1914, Souchon's ships arrived at Constantinople, having escaped the British pursuit. Winston Churchill stated about the escape of the ships:

Admiral Souchon was cruising irresolutely about the Greek islands endeavoring to make sure that he would be admitted by the Turks to the Dardanelles. He dallied 36 hours at Denusa and was forced to use his telltale wireless on several occasions. It was not until the evening of the 10th that he entered the Dardanelles, and the Curse descended irrevocably upon Ottoman Empire and the East.

— Winston Churchill First Lord of the Admiralty

On 16 August, Cemal Pasha presided over the formal commissioning of the Goeben and the Breslau, which were renamed Yavuz Sultan Selim and Midilli respectively, and their officers and crews into the Ottoman Navy. The sailors put on the fez. In light of the British seizure of the Ottoman dreadnoughts, the "purchase" of the German ships was a propaganda victory for the Ottomans at home. Souchon's real title is unknown. As a German commander of a fleet in a foreign country, Souchon was under the aegis of Ambassador Wangenheim. Germany had a military mission under General Otto Liman von Sanders accredited to Turkey on 27 October 1913. Souchon was not part of the military mission and had little to do with Sanders. At that point, Said Halim feared that neither Souchon nor his ships were under Ottoman control.

In September 1914, the British naval mission to the Ottomans, which had been in place since 1912, was recalled because of the increasing concern that the Ottomans would enter the war. Rear Admiral Souchon of the Imperial German Navy took command of the Ottoman navy. Acting without orders from the Ottoman government, the German commander of the Dardanelles fortifications ordered the passage closed on 27 September, which added to the impression that the Ottomans were pro-German. The German naval presence and the success of the German armies in Europe gave the pro-German faction in the Ottoman government sufficient influence over the pro-British faction to declare war on Russia.

On 14 September, Enver directed Souchon to take his ships into the Black Sea and fire upon any Russian vessel that they encountered. That was problematic in many ways. The directive, which went over the head of Navy Minister Cemal Pasha, was presumably issued by Enver as acting commander-in-chief although Souchon's place in the chain of command was unclear. Said Halim forced a cabinet vote on the issue of Enver's directive, and it was revoked. At the same time, Souchon wanted to "conduct training cruises". Souchon complained to Wangenheim, who authorised him to approach the Ottoman government directly. Talks between the German admiral and Said Halim were held on 18 September. Said Halim, who was also assured by Wangenheim, was unhappy about this request. Said Halim feared that neither Souchon nor his ships were under Ottoman control. The British naval mission was vacated by Admiral Limpus on 15 September and it was proposed that Souchon should take over the departing admiral's role. In early September, a German naval mission comprising about 700 sailors and coastal defence specialists under Admiral Guido von Usedom arrived to bolster the defences of the Straits. As per the naval mission headed by Guido von Usedom, Souchon was to receive a one-year commission in the Ottoman Navy, which would place him directly under the orders of Cemal Pasha. Also, Germans were forbidden to conduct exercises in the Black Sea.

On 24 September 1914, Admiral Souchon was commissioned in the Ottoman Navy with the rank of Vice Admiral and thus had direct command of instruments of war. Liman von Sanders never reached that level of independence. Souchon's allegiance to the Ottoman Empire was questionable, but through him Germany could use the Ottoman war machine independently.

Said Halim brought Souchon and his ships "somewhat" under Ottoman control. There was an ineffective command relationship between the Ottomans and Souchon. Navy Minister Ahmet Cemal Pasha appropriately ignored those events in his memoir. Cemal Pasha also paused his memories between 12 and 30 October.

On 22 October 1914 Enver issued a secret order to Souchon: "The Turkish fleet will secure naval mastery in the Black Sea. Seek the Russian navy and attack it without prior declaration of war."

Two ships and One Admiral

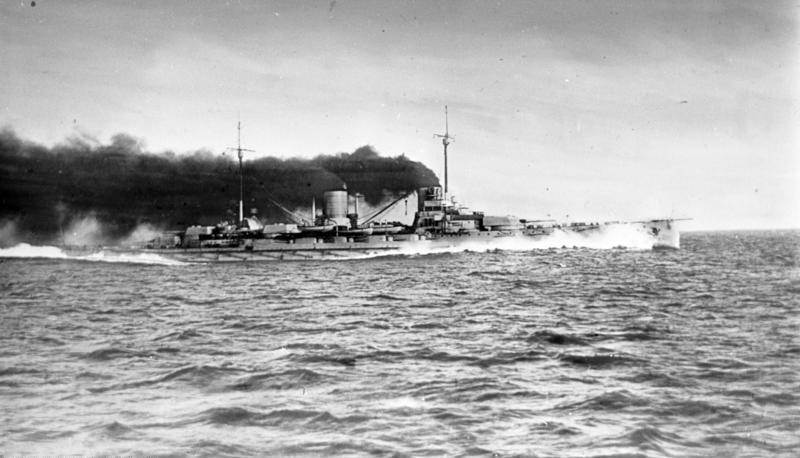
Battlecruiser SMS Goeben

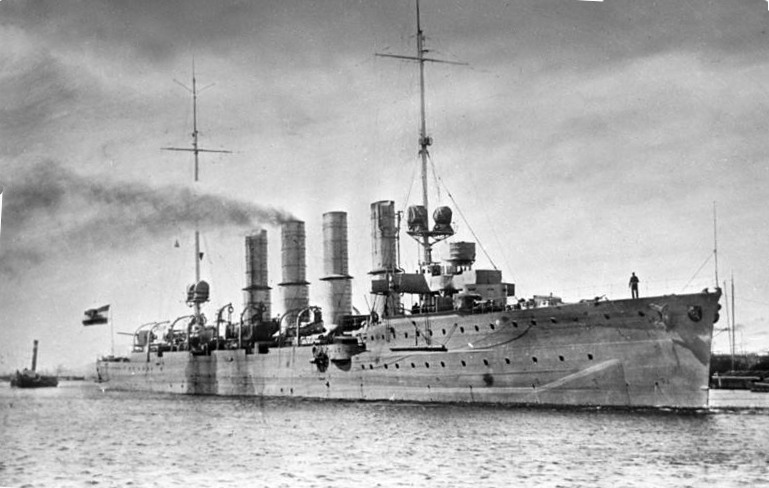
Light cruiser SMS Breslau

Wilhelm Souchon

=== Casus belli ===
In October, Cemal Pasha instructed senior officials that Souchon was entitled to issue orders. Cemal Pasha did not write why he gave the order in his memoir. Souchon, at his commission to the Ottoman Navy, agreed not to exercise in the Black Sea. Souchon took his heavily flagged and bedecked ships out to the Black Sea.

On 25 October, Enver instructed Souchon to manoeuvre in the Black Sea and to attack the Russian fleet "if a suitable opportunity presented itself". That was not passed through the normal chain of command, and the Ministry of Navy ignored it. The Ottoman cabinet, including Sait Halim, was not informed.

On 26 October, the Ottoman Navy received orders for the supply of the ships stationed at the Haydarpaşa. Ships were declared to be leaving for a reconnaissance exercise. There was also a sealed order from Souchon.

On 28 October, the Ottoman fleet reorganized in four combat wings. Each went to separate locations along the Russian coast.

On 29 October, Souchon was on his preferred warship Goeben in the first wing, accompanied by several destroyers. He opened fire on shore batteries on Sevastopol, at 6:30 am. The Breslau reached the Black Sea port of Theodosia exactly 6:30 am. He informed the local authorities that hostilities began in two hours. He shelled the port from 9 am until 10 pm Then he moved to Yalta and sank several small Russian vessels. At 10:50 am, he was at Novorossiysk where he informed the locals, fired on shore batteries and laid 60 mines. Seven ships in the port were damaged and one sunk by the third wing. Two destroyers engaged the Battle of Odessa (1914) at 6:30 am. They sank two gunboats and damaged granaries.

On 29 October, the Allies presented a note to Grand Vizier Said Halim Pasha to indicate that they had made an agreement with Egypt and that any hostility towards Egypt would be treated as a declaration of war.

On 29 October, the entire Ottoman fleet returned to Constantinople. Enver wrote a congratulatory letter at 5:50 pm.

=== Declaration ===
The Ottomans refused an Allied demand to expel German naval and military missions. The Ottoman Navy destroyed a Russian gunboat on 29 October at 6:30 am at the Battle of Odessa during the Black Sea Raid.

On 31 October, the Ottomans formally entered the war on the side of the Central Powers.

On 1 November 1914, Russia declared war on the Ottomans. The first conflict with Russia was the Bergmann Offensive of the Caucasus Campaign on 2 November 1914.

On 2 November, the Grand Vizier expressed regret to the Allies for the operations of the Navy. Russian Minister of Foreign Affairs Sergey Sazonov declared that it was too late and that Russia considered the raid an act of war. The Ottoman Cabinet explained in vain that hostilities had begun without its sanction by German officers serving in the Navy. The Allies insisted on reparations to Russia, the dismissal of German officers from the Goeben and Breslau and the internment of the German ships until the end of the war.

On 3 November, the British ambassador left Constantinople. The same day, a British naval squadron off the Dardanelles bombarded the outer defensive forts at Kum Kale on the northern Asian coast and Seddülbahir on the southern tip of the Gallipoli Peninsula. A British shell hit a magazine in one of the forts, knocked the guns off their mounts and killed 86 soldiers.

On 5 November, before the Ottoman government had responded, the United Kingdom and France also declared war on the Ottomans. The and started the Caucasus Campaign with an offensive against the Russians to regain their former provinces.

On 6 November, the Mesopotamian campaign started with a British landing at Basra.

On 11 November, Sultan Mehmed V declared a jihad against the Entente powers. (Note: Using the Rumi calendar, the declaration was dated 29 Teşrin-i Evvel 1330.)

On 13 November, there was a ceremony in which justification of the war was presented to Sultan Mehmed V.

On 14 November came the official declaration of war by the CUP, the party that dominated the chamber. The Chamber's declaration could be stated as a "declaration of existence of the war". The entire affair was completed in three days.

The Ottomans prepared an offensive against Egypt in early 1915 and aimed to occupy the Suez Canal, which would block the Mediterranean route to India and the Far East. The war began in August 1914 in Europe, and the Ottoman Empire had joined the war on the side of Germany and Austria-Hungary within three months. Hew Strachan wrote in 2001 that, in hindsight, Ottoman belligerence was inevitable once Goeben and Breslau had been allowed into the Dardanelles and that delays were caused by Ottoman unreadiness for war and Bulgarian neutrality, rather than policy uncertainty.

Date	Declarer	On
1914
1 November	(Russian Empire) Russia	Ottoman Empire
5 November	(United Kingdom of Great Britain and Ireland) United Kingdom; France	Ottoman Empire
2 December	(Kingdom of Serbia) Serbia	Ottoman Empire
3 December	(Kingdom of Montenegro) Montenegro	Ottoman Empire
5 December	(Empire of Japan) Japan	Ottoman Empire
1915
21 August	(Kingdom of Italy) Italy	Ottoman Empire
1916
30 August	Ottoman Empire	(Kingdom of Romania) Romania
1917
27 June	(Kingdom of Greece) Greece	Ottoman Empire

== Reactions ==
The Battle of Odessa instigated a crisis environment within the Ottoman leadership. Sait Halim and Mehmet Cavit Bey strongly protested to Enver. They argued that the attack was weak and in dispersed naval raids and so it was only a political provocation, rather than as a serious naval operation. Talat told Wangenheim that the entire cabinet, excluding Enver, opposed the naval action.

Over the next two days there was chaos in Ottoman politics. Sait Halim and several others offered their resignations. Finance Minister Mehmet Cavit Bey was one of four ministers to resign and declared, "It will be our country's ruin—even if we win." Casualties at Gallipoli validated his comment. Although the engagement is considered a "victory" for the Ottomans, they suffered the staggering loss of up to 250,000 soldiers out of an army of 315,500.

This chaos showed signs of resolving itself when Enver explained to Talat his reasons for a pro-interventionist stance. However, the largest calming effect came from Russia declaring war on 1 November. Sait Halim found himself talking to Russia, Britain, and France in turn.

== Military preparedness ==
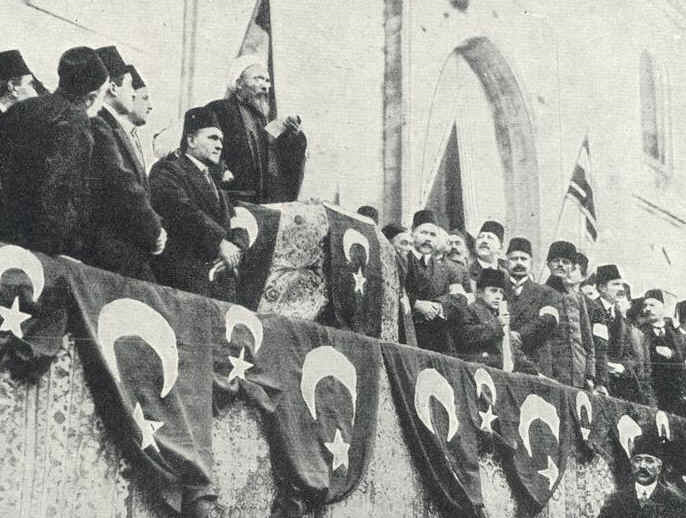
Fetva emini Ali Haydar Efendi declaring a jihad against the Entente Powers

A new military conscription law had been prepared after the Young Turk Revolution by the Ministry of War in October 1908. According to the law, all subjects between the ages of 20 and 45 were to fulfill mandatory military service. The law allowed for more than 1 million soldiers to be mobilised by the state in attempt to be better prepared for the war. According to A History of the Modern Middle East (2018) by William L. Cleveland, the declining empire had various unlikely successes during the war and "its ability to endure four years of total warfare testified to the tenacity with which its civilian and military populations defended the Ottoman order."

On 13 November 1914, at a ceremony in Sultan Mehmed V's presence and with the relics of the Prophet, a jihad (holy war) was proclaimed. Five juridical opinions legitimised the call, which was for the first time for all Muslims, particularly those in territories ruled by the colonial powers of Britain, France and Russia, to rise against the infidel. There was some enthusiasm for the appeal to the Muslim community at large among Arab clerics, but the Sharif of Mecca's support was critical. Sharif Husayn refused to associate himself by stating that it may provoke a blockade and possibly the bombardment of the ports of the Hijaz by the British, which controlled the Red Sea and Egypt. The reaction from the wider Islamic world was muted. In Egypt and India, for instance, juridical opinions asserted that it was obligatory to obey the British.

The main burden of providing combat manpower fell on the Turkish peasantry of Anatolia, which accounted for some 40% of the total Ottoman population at the outset of the war.

== Analysis ==
Several factors conspired to influence the Ottoman government and to encourage it to enter the war. According to Kemal Karpat:

Ottoman entry into the war was not the consequence of careful preparation and long debate in the parliament (which was recessed) and press. It was the result of a hasty decision by a handful of elitist leaders who disregarded democratic procedures, lacked long-range political vision, and fell easy victim to German machinations and their own utopian expectations of recovering the lost territories in the Balkans. The Ottoman entry into war prolonged it for two years and allowed the Bolshevik revolution to incubate and then explode in 1917, which in turn profoundly impacted the course of world history in the 20th century.

=== Russian threat ===
Russia was the pivotal factor politically. When Britain was drawn into the Triple Entente and began to cultivate relations with Russia, the Porte became distrustful. The Porte had gradually drifted, with opposition from the parliament, into close political relations with Germany. The relationship between the United Kingdom and France had encouraged Italy to seize Tripoli. The Russians' desires for Straits for open access to the Mediterranean and Atlantic Ocean from its Black Sea ports were well known. Those conditions put the United Kingdom, France, and Russia against Germany. Even the pro-Entente Cemal Pasha recognised that the Ottomans had no choice but to agree with Germany and the Central Powers to avoid being left isolated in another moment of crisis.

The Porte's policy would naturally be inclined toward dependence on Berlin. The Ottoman-German alliance promised to isolate Russia. In exchange for money and future control over Russian territory, the Ottoman government abandoned a neutral position and sided with Germany.

=== Christians perceived as fifth column ===
Violence associated with the Greek genocide had already begun before the assassination of Archduke Franz Ferdinand. A few months later, the Special Organization enlarged the scope of its anti-Christian activities into what would become the Armenian genocide and Assyrian genocide.

=== Financial position ===
The total pre-war debt of the Ottomans was US$716,000,000 (equivalent to $22.23 billion in 2024). France held 60% of the total, Germany held 20%, and the United Kingdom had 15%. Siding with Germany, put the Ottomans in the position to settle their debts or even receive a war indemnity. Indeed, on the day of the signing of the alliance with Germany, the government announced the end of foreign debt repayments. The German ambassador proposed a joint protest with the Ottomans' other creditor—states on the grounds that international regulations could not be unilaterally abrogated, but no agreement could be reached on the text of the protest note.

=== Inevitability of war ===
The undisputed point in all of those arguments is that a small group of politicians tied the state to the Central Powers. The more important question is what choices it had. The Ottomans tried to remain neutral for as long as they could.

==== Risk all ====
The Ottomans were portrayed as risking everything to resolve regional issues. The Ottomans did not have finely-tuned war aims. Neither Germany nor any of the other Central Powers had to make significant concessions to formulate the German–Ottoman alliance, which created a strategic problem for the Entente. Some historians have argued that the Ottomans went unwillingly into the war despite the actions of Enver Pasha. His celebration of the Battle of Odessa separated him from other cabinet members. It is proposed that Enver knew the consequences of Odessa beforehand. His defence made him appear complicit even if he was not.

== See also ==
- Causes of World War I
  - Historiography of the causes of World War I
  - Austro-Hungarian entry into World War I
  - German entry into World War I
  - British entry into World War I
  - French entry into World War I
  - Italian entry into World War I
- Diplomatic history of World War I
- International relations of the Great Powers (1814–1919)
- Central Powers
- Home front during World War I covering all major countries

== Bibliography ==
- Akın, Yiğit (2018). When the War Came Home: The Ottomans' Great War and the Devastation of an Empire. Stanford University Press.
- Aksakal, Mustafa (2010). The Ottoman Road to War in 1914: The Ottoman Empire and the First World War. Cambridge University Press. ISBN 978-0-521-17525-8.
- Aksakal, Mustafa. "‘Holy War Made in Germany’? Ottoman Origins of the 1914 Jihad." War in History 18.2 (2011): 184-199.
- Aspinall-Oglander, C. F. (1929). Military Operations Gallipoli: Inception of the Campaign to May 1915. History of the Great War Based on Official Documents by Direction of the Historical Section of the Committee of Imperial Defence. Vol. I (1st ed.). London: Heinemann. OCLC 464479053.
- Balakian, Peter (2004). The Burning Tigris: The Armenian Genocide and America's Response. Harpercollins. ISBN 978-0060558703.
- Balki, Ali et al. "War Decision and Neoclassical Realism: The Entry of the Ottoman Empire into the First World War" War in History (2018) pp 1–28 https://doi.org/10.1177/0968344518789707 online
- Beckett, F.W. "Turkey's Momentous Moment" History Today (June 2013) 63#6 pp 47–53
- Beşikçi, Mehmet (2012). The Ottoman Mobilization of Manpower in the First World War. Brill. ISBN 978-90-04-22520-6.
- Bozarslan, Hamit. "The Ottoman Empire." in John Horne. ed. A Companion to World War I (2010): 494–507.
- Broadbent, H. (2005). Gallipoli: The Fatal Shore. Camberwell, Victoria: Viking/Penguin. ISBN 0-670-04085-1.
- Carlyon, Les (2001). Gallipoli. Sydney: Pan Macmillan. ISBN 978-0-7329-1089-1.
- Cornelissen, Christoph, and Arndt Weinrich, eds. Writing the Great War - The Historiography of World War I from 1918 to the Present (2020) free download; full coverage for major countries.
- Erickson, Edward J. (2001). Ordered to Die: A History of the Ottoman Army in the First World War. Westport, CT: Greenwood. ISBN 978-0-313-31516-9.
- Erickson, Edward J. (2013). Ottomans and Armenians: A Study in Counterinsurgency. Palgrave Macmillan. ISBN 978-1137362209.
- Fewster, Kevin; Basarin, Vecihi; Basarin, Hatice Hurmuz (2003) [1985]. Gallipoli: The Turkish Story. Crow's Nest, NSW: Allen & Unwin. ISBN 978-1-74114-045-3.
- Finkel, Caroline (2007). Osman's Dream: The History of the Ottoman Empire. Basic Books. ISBN 978-0-465-00850-6.
- Gingeras, Ryan. Fall of the Sultanate: The Great War and the End of the Ottoman Empire, 1908-1922 (Oxford UP, 2016).
- Hamilton, Richard F.; Herwig, Holger H. (2005). Decisions for War, 1914–1917. Cambridge: Cambridge University Press. ISBN 978-0-51119-678-2.
- Haythornthwaite, Philip (2004) [1991]. Gallipoli 1915: Frontal Assault on Turkey. Campaign Series. London: Osprey. ISBN 978-0-275-98288-1.
- Holmes, Richard, ed. (2001). The Oxford Companion to Military History. Oxford: Oxford University Press. ISBN 978-0-19-866209-9.
- Howard, Michael (2002). The First World War. Oxford: Oxford University Press. ISBN 978-0-19-285362-2.
- Karpat, Kemal H. "The entry of the ottoman empire into world war I." Belleten 68.253 (2004): 1-40. online
- Karsh, Efraim; Karsh, Inari (1999), Empires of Sand (hardback), Cambridge: Harvard University Press, ISBN 978-0-67425152-6
- Kayalı, Hasan. "The Ottoman Experience of World War I: Historiographical Problems and Trends," Journal of Modern History (2017) 89#4: 875–907. https://doi.org/10.1086/694391.
- Keegan, John (1998). The First World War. London: Pimlico. ISBN 978-0-7126-6645-9.
- Kent, Marian (1996). The Great Powers and the End of the Ottoman Empire. Routledge. ISBN 0714641545.
- Macfie, A. L. The End of the Ottoman Empire, 1908-1923 (1998).
- Massie, Robert (2004). Castles of Steel: Britain, Germany and the winning of the Great War. Random House. ISBN 0-224-04092-8.
- Nicolle, David (2008). The Ottomans: Empire of Faith. Thalamus Publishing. ISBN 978-1902886114.
- Öncü, Edip. "The beginnings of Ottoman-German partnership: diplomatic and military relations between Germany and the Ottoman Empire before the First World War" (MA thesis Bilkent University, 2003); online, reviews the Turkish language scholarship.
- Penix, Matthew David. "The Ottoman Empire in the first world war: A rational disaster" (MA thesis Eastern Michigan U. 2013). online, bibliography pp 58–66
- Reynolds, Michael A. (2011). Shattering Empires: The Clash and Collapse of the Ottoman and Russian Empires 1908–1918. Cambridge University Press. p. 324. ISBN 978-0521149167.
- Smith, C. Jay. "Great Britain and the 1914-1915 Straits Agreement with Russia: The British Promise of November 1914." American Historical Review 70.4 (1965): 1015–1034. online
- Strachan, Hew (2001). The First World War, Volume 1: To Arms. New York: Oxford University Press. ISBN 0-19-926191-1.
- Trumpener, Ulrich. (2003). "The Ottoman Empire" in Richard F. Hamilton and Holger H. Herweg, eds. The Origins of World War I pp 337–55
- Trumpener, Ulrich (1962). "Turkey's Entry into World War I: An Assessment of Responsibilities". Journal of Modern History. 34 (4): 369–80. doi:10.1086/239180. S2CID 153500703.
- Trumpener, Ulrich. "Liman von Sanders and the German-Ottoman alliance." Journal of Contemporary History 1.4 (1966): 179-192 online.
- Trumpener, Ulrich. Germany and the Ottoman Empire, 1914-1918 (1968)
- Weber, Frank G. Eagles on the crescent: Germany, Austria, and the diplomacy of the Turkish alliance, 1914-1918 (Cornell UP, 1970).
