= Bulgarian–Ottoman convention (1915) =

1915 treaty between Bulgaria and the Ottoman Empire

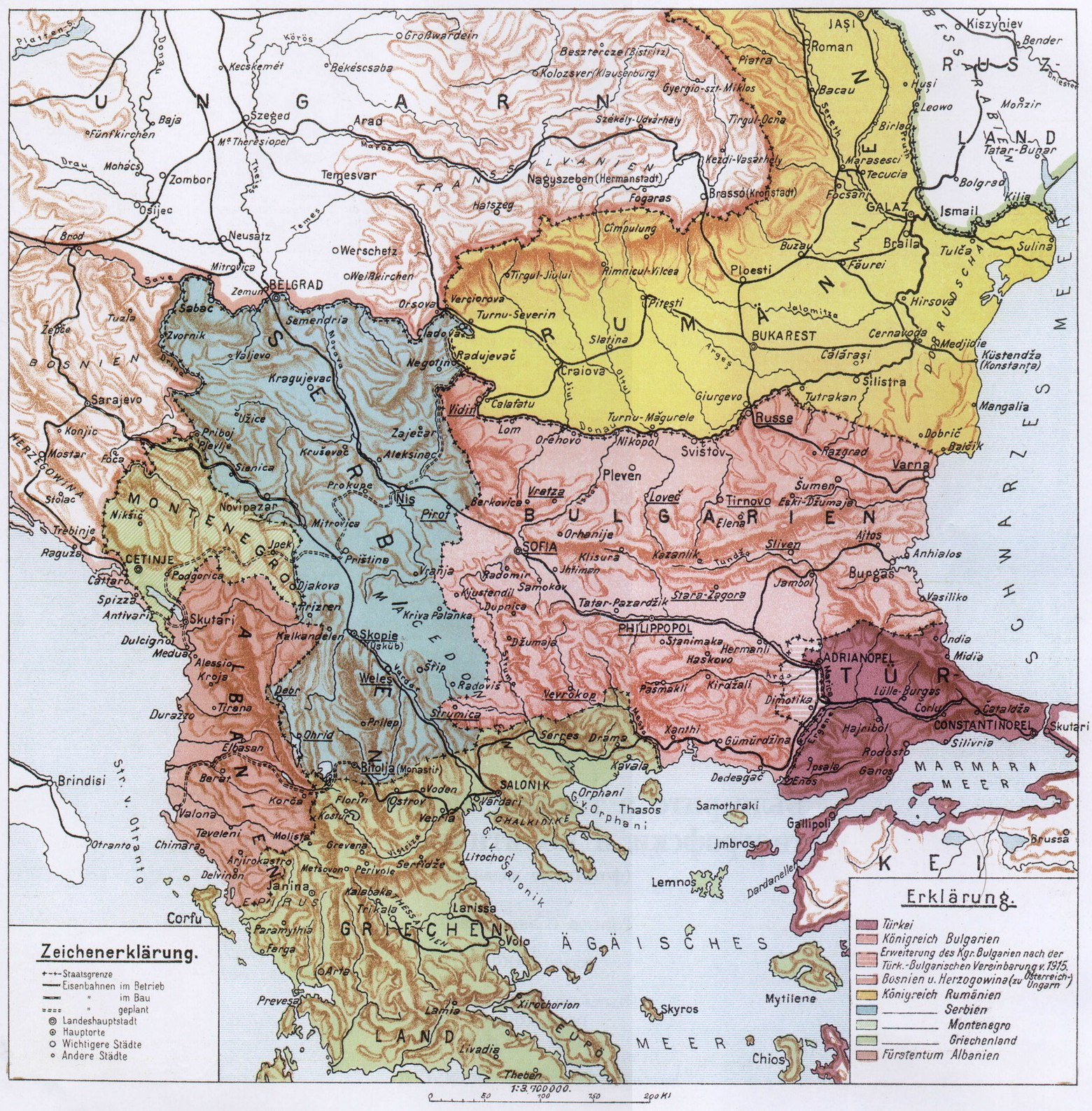
Map of the territorial changes (horizontal shaded lines) of the Convention of Sofia

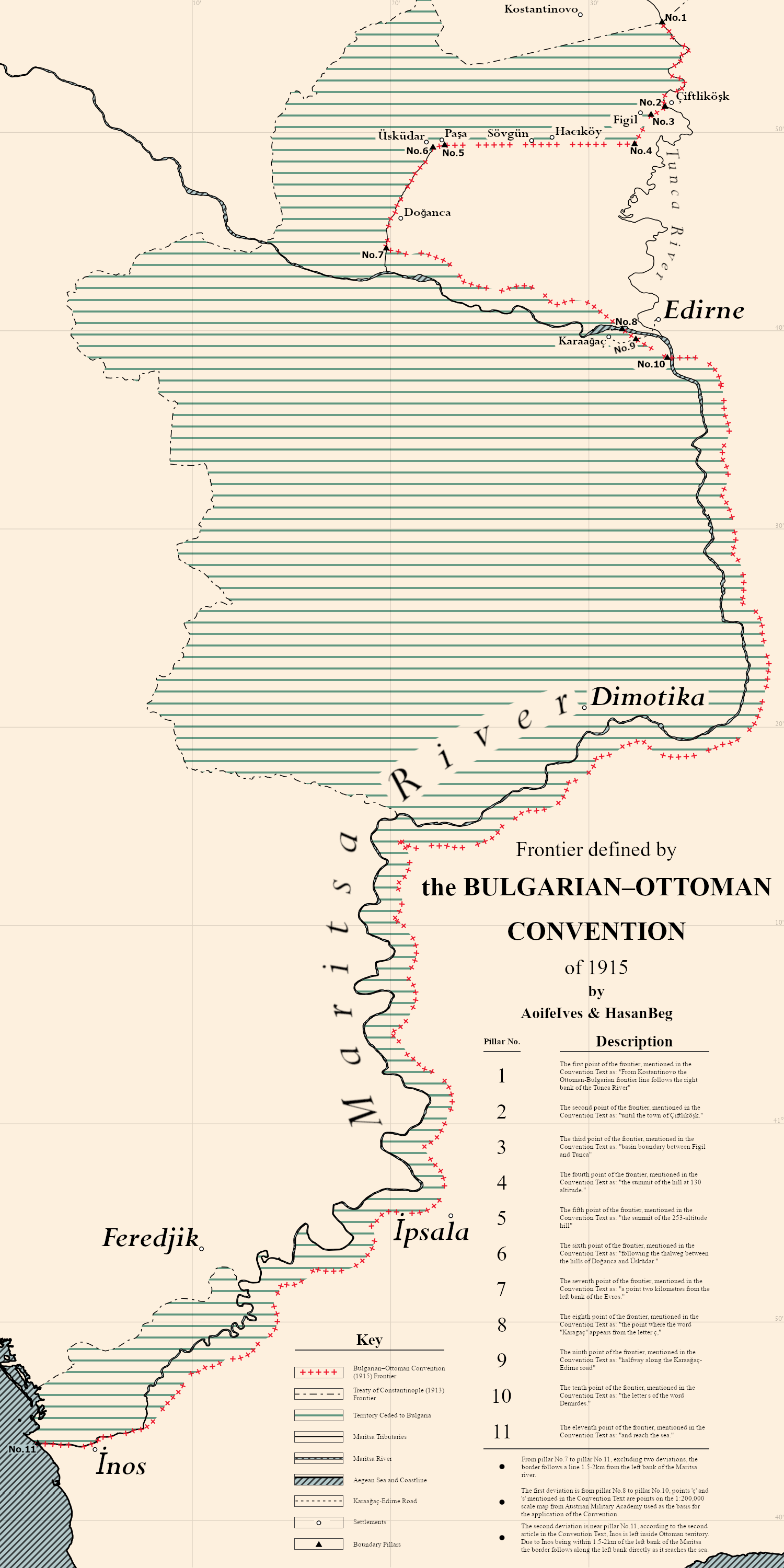
Closer view of the same

Territory ceded to Bulgaria by the Ottoman Empire

The convention of Sofia between Bulgaria and the Ottoman Empire (Turkey) was signed on 6 September (24 August O.S.) 1915. It rectified the border between the two countries in Bulgaria's favour in order to bring Bulgaria into the First World War on the side of the Central Powers.

A defensive alliance between Bulgaria and Turkey had been concluded on 19 August 1914, but negotiations for Bulgaria's intervention in the war did not begin between the two parties until May 1915. It quickly became clear that Bulgaria sought a rectification of the border, and Germany and Austria-Hungary put pressure on their Ottoman ally to accept. The Austro-Hungarians for their part were convinced that a Turco-Bulgarian alliance would keep Greece and Romania neutral. The German ambassador to Turkey, Hans von Wangenheim, was unconvinced by the proposed alliance, believing that Romanian neutrality could only be secured by Austro-Hungarian territorial concessions. The Austro-Hungarian ambassador, Johann von Pallavicini, convinced the Ottomans to accept a border rectification, but Bulgaria initially refused to consider abandoning their neutrality—the only condition on which the Ottomans would yield territory.

On 6 August 1915, the British launched an offensive on Gallipoli that exposed Turkey's grave shortage of munitions. On 17 August, the Turkish minister of war, Enver Pasha, wrote to the German chief of staff, Erich von Falkenhayn, to see if an Austro-German offensive against Serbia was forthcoming. When told that it hinged on Bulgaria's intervention, which in turn hinged on a Turco-Bulgarian pact, the Ottomans reached a quick agreement with Bulgaria on 22 August. They ceded the Maritsa river and its left bank to a depth of 1.5 kilometres. This gave Bulgaria control of the railway to the Aegean port of Dedeagach. It also left Edirne (Adrianople) vulnerable to Bulgarian attack, but signature of the accord was dependent on a military convention being signed between Bulgaria, Austria-Hungary and Germany.

In addition to the Bulgarian-Ottoman convention, Bulgaria also signed a treaty of alliance with Germany and a military convention between Germany, Austria-Hungary and Bulgaria in Sofia on 6 September. Bulgaria agreed to allow the transit of German and Austro-Hungarian supplies through its territory to the Ottoman Empire and to invade Serbia with a large force. By November, Turkey's critical supply problem, which had threatened to destroy the regime in August, had been resolved.

== Sources ==
- A. R. H. (1920). "The New Boundaries of Bulgaria". The Geographical Journal. 55 (2): 127–38. doi:10.2307/1781586. JSTOR 1781586.
- Hall, Richard C. (2011). "Bulgaria in the First World War". The Historian. 73 (2): 300–15. doi:10.1111/j.1540-6563.2011.00293.x. S2CID 142538427.
- Silberstein, Gerard E. (1967). "The Serbian Campaign of 1915: Its Diplomatic Background". American Historical Review. 73 (1): 51–69. doi:10.2307/1849028. JSTOR 1849028.
