= Cyprus Convention =

1878 secret agreement on Cyprus between the UK and the Ottoman Empire

The Cyprus Convention of 4 June 1878 was a secret agreement reached between the United Kingdom and the Ottoman Empire which granted administrative control of Cyprus to Britain (see British Cyprus), in exchange for its support of the Ottomans during the Congress of Berlin. Provisions in the Convention retained Ottoman rights over the territory of Cyprus.

This agreement was the result of secret negotiations that took place earlier in 1878. The Convention was abrogated by the British on 5 November 1914, when Britain and the Ottoman Empire found themselves at war with each other following the Ottoman entry into World War I.

== British administration established, 1878 ==
The Sultan, Abdul Hamid II, ceded the administration of Cyprus to Britain, in exchange for guarantees that Britain would use the island as a base to protect the Ottoman Empire against possible Russian aggression. The British had been offered Cyprus three times (in 1833, 1841, and 1845) before accepting it in 1878.

In the mid-1870s, Britain and other European powers were faced with preventing Russian expansion into areas controlled by a weakening Ottoman Empire. Russia was trying to fill the power vacuum by expanding the Czar's empire west and south toward the warm water port of Constantinople and the Dardanelles. British administration of Cyprus was intended to forestall such an expansion. In June 1878, clandestine negotiations between Britain and the Porte culminated in the Cyprus Convention, by which "His Imperial Majesty the Sultan further consents to assign the island of Cyprus to be occupied and administered by England."

There was some opposition to the agreement in Britain, especially from Liberal leader William Ewart Gladstone. When Gladstone returned to power he did not return the island. Greek Cypriot nationalism made its presence known to the new rulers, when, in a welcoming speech at Larnaca for the first British High Commissioner to Cyprus, the bishop of Kition expressed the hope that the British would expedite the unification of Cyprus and Greece as they had previously done with the Ionian Islands. Thus, the British were confronted at the very beginning of their administration with the reality that enosis was vital to many Greek Cypriots.

The island served Britain as a key military base on the sea route to British India, which was then Britain's most important overseas possession. In 1906, a new harbour at Famagusta was completed, increasing the importance of Cyprus as a strategic naval outpost protecting the approaches to the Suez Canal. Early in the First World War the Ottoman Empire joined the Central Powers, and on 5 November 1914 Britain annexed Cyprus, bringing an end to the Convention following the Ottoman entry into World War I.

== Cyprus Tribute ==
The terms of the Convention provided that the excess of the island's revenue over the expenditures for government should be paid as an "annual fixed payment" by Britain to the Sultan. This provision enabled the Porte to assert that it had not ceded or surrendered Cyprus to the British, but had merely temporarily turned over administration. Because of these terms, the action was sometimes described as a British leasing of the island. The "Cyprus Tribute" became a major source of discontent underlying later Cypriot unrest.

Negotiations eventually determined the sum of the annual fixed payment at exactly 92,799 pounds sterling, eleven shillings, and three pence. Governor Ronald Storrs later wrote that the calculation of this sum was made with "all that scrupulous exactitude characteristic of faked accounts." The Cypriots found themselves not only paying the tribute, but also covering the expenses incurred by the new colonial administration, creating a steady drain on an already poor economy.

From the start, the matter of the Cyprus Tribute was severely exacerbated by the fact that the money was never paid to the Ottomans. Instead it was deposited in the Bank of England to pay off Ottoman Crimean War loans (guaranteed by both Britain and France) on which the Ottomans had defaulted. This arrangement greatly disturbed the Ottomans as well as the Cypriots. The small sum left over went into a contingency fund, which further irritated the Sublime Porte. Public opinion on Cyprus held that the Cypriots were being forced to pay a debt with which they were in no way connected. Agitation against the tribute was incessant, and the annual payment became a source of nationalist anger towards the British.

There was also British opposition to the tribute. Undersecretary of State for the Colonies Winston Churchill visited Cyprus in 1907 and, in a report on his visit, declared, "We have no right, except by force majeure, to take a penny of the Cyprus Tribute to relieve us from our own obligations, however unfortunately contracted." Parliament soon voted a permanent annual grant-in-aid of 50,000 pounds sterling to Cyprus and reduced the tribute accordingly.

== Annexation of Cyprus by Britain, 1914, ends Convention ==
Following the outbreak of the First World War, the Ottoman Empire decided to join the war on the side of the Central Powers, and on 5 November 1914 the British formally annexed Cyprus as a Crown colony. At the same time, the Ottoman Khedivate of Egypt and the Sudan was declared to be the Sultanate of Egypt, a British protectorate.
