= German–Ottoman alliance =

Alliance in WW1 between the Ottoman Empire and German Empire

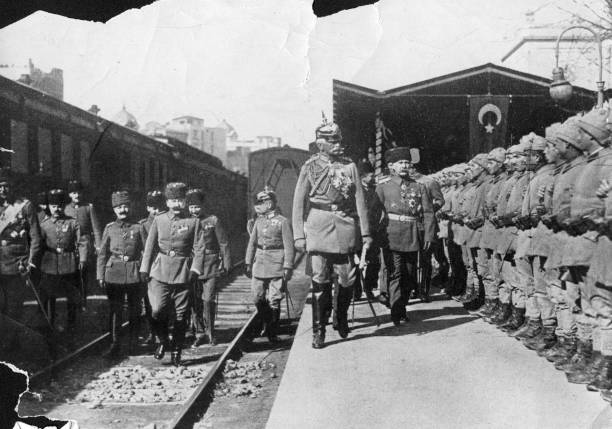
General August von Mackensen inspects soldiers of the Ottoman Empire

The German–Ottoman alliance was ratified by the German Empire and the Ottoman Empire on August 2, 1914, shortly after the outbreak of World War I. It was created as part of a joint effort to strengthen and modernize the weak Ottoman military and to provide Germany with safe passage into the neighbouring British colonies.

== Background ==
In the eve of the First World War, the Ottoman Empire was in ruinous shape. It had lost substantial territory in disastrous wars, its economy was in shambles and its subjects were demoralized. The Empire needed time to recover and to carry out reforms, but the world was sliding into war and it would need to take a position. After the Italo-Turkish War and Balkan Wars, the Empire's resources were completely drained. Remaining neutral and focusing on recovery became impossible on the outbreak of the First World War, so the Empire needed to ally with one camp or the other. It did not have adequate quantities of weaponry or machinery, and lacked the financial means to purchase new ones. The Sublime Porte's only option was to establish an alliance with a European power; it did seem to not really matter which one. Talat Pasha, the Minister of Interior, wrote in his memoirs: "Turkey needed to join one of the country groups so that it could organize its domestic administration, strengthen and maintain its commerce and industry, expand its railroads, in short, to survive and to preserve its existence."

=== Negotiating alliances ===
Most European powers were not interested in joining an alliance with the ailing Ottoman Empire. Already, at the beginning of the Turco-Italian War in Northern Africa, Grand Vizier Sait Halim Pasha had expressed need for an alliance, and asked Ottoman ambassadors to find out whether the European capitals would be interested. Only Russia seemed amenable, but only under conditions that would have amounted to a Russian protectorate over Ottoman lands. It was impossible to form an alliance with the French, as France's main ally was Russia, the long-time enemy of the Ottoman Empire dating back to the War of 1828. Britain declined an Ottoman request.

Ottoman Sultan Mehmed V specifically wanted the Empire to remain a non-belligerent nation. However, he was largely a figurehead, without real control of the government. Pressure from some of Mehmed's senior advisors led the Empire to enter an alliance with Germany and the Central Powers.

Germany had harboured imperial ambitions since 1890, which had not borne fruit, and by 1909, it became clear that Germans would not prevail in the Anglo-German naval arms race. Even with technological superiority, Germany's energy infrastructure would be unable to support battleships in distant waters. Germany was weak relative to the other European colonial powers, and sought a strategic alliance with the Ottoman Empire. The Baghdad Railway would have advanced Germany's imperial ambitions, including the settlement of Germans in Anatolia, and given the Germans greater flexibility in transporting their troops to the Persian Gulf and on to British Raj. As soon as the railway was proposed, it became a point of tension between Germany and the UK, since the latter considered southern Persia their sphere of influence, where German power shouldn't have been projected.

Germany needed the Ottoman Empire on its side. The Orient Express had run directly to Constantinople since 1889, and prior to the First World War, the Sultan had consented to a plan to extend it through Anatolia to Baghdad under German auspices. That would strengthen the Ottoman Empire's link with the industrialized Europe and give Germany easier access to its African colonies and to trade markets in British India.

However, in June 1914 Berlin agreed not to construct the line south of Baghdad, and to recognise Britain's preponderant interest in the region. The issue was resolved to the satisfaction of both sides and did not play a role in causing the war.

== Treaty with Germany ==
A secret treaty was concluded between the two empires on August 2, 1914. The Ottomans were to enter the war on the side of the Central Powers one day after the German Empire declared war on Russia. The alliance was ratified on 2 August by many high-ranking Ottoman officials including Grand Vizier Said Halim Pasha, the Minister of War Enver Pasha, the Interior Minister Talat Pasha, and Head of Parliament Halil Bey. Austria-Hungary adhered to the Ottoman–German treaty on 5 August.

However, not all members of the Ottoman government accepted the alliance. There was no signature from the Sultan Mehmed V, who was nominally in charge of the army but had little power. The third member of the cabinet of the Three Pashas, Cemal Pasha, also did not sign the treaty, as he had tried to form an alliance with France.

Berlin grew annoyed as the Ottomans stalled, but offered two ships and a large loan. Two German cruisers reached Dardanelles with great difficulties on 10th August, and on 16th they were transferred to the Ottoman Navy, which was very popular with local population because Britain requisitioned two Ottoman battleships earlier.

In August, Germany—still expecting a swift victory—was content for the Ottoman Empire to remain neutral. The mere presence of a powerful warship like Goeben in the Sea of Marmara would be enough to occupy a British naval squadron guarding the Dardanelles. However, following German reverses at the First Battle of the Marne in September, and with Russian successes against Austria-Hungary, Germany began to regard the Ottoman Empire as a useful ally. Tensions began to escalate when the Ottoman Empire closed the Dardanelles to all shipping on 27 September, blocking Russia's exit from the Black Sea—that accounted for over 90 percent of Russia's import and export traffic.

On 10 October 1914 a gold loan agreement to finance Ottoman mobilization with 5 millions liras (worth 2 months of Ottoman total public spending or about 10 months of warfare by contemporary estimates) was signed, and on October 29 the Ottomans entered the war after their fleet bombarded Russian ports on orders from Enver Pasha.

On January 22, 1915, a more general alliance was signed between the Ottoman Empire and Germany that was to last five years. On September 28, 1916, the two agreed not to sign a separate peace with the Allies. In October 1917, the 1915 treaty was amended to enhance military cooperation between the empires. On March 21, 1916, Austria-Hungary joined the Ottoman-German pact. The Alliance was terminated on 7 November 1918, after the Armistice of Mudros.

== See also ==
- Ottoman entry into World War I
- Diplomatic history of World War I
- Germany–Turkey relations
- Pursuit of Goeben and Breslau
- Ottoman–Bulgarian alliance
- Middle Eastern theatre of World War I
