= Ottoman–Bulgarian alliance =

1914 alliance between the Ottoman Empire and Bulgaria

An Ottoman–Bulgarian (or Turco-Bulgarian) alliance was signed in Sofia on 19 August (6 August O.S.) 1914 during the opening month of the First World War, although at the time both the signatories were neutral. The Minister of the Interior, Talaat Pasha, and President Halil Bey of the Chamber of Deputies signed the treaty on behalf of the Ottoman Empire (Turkey) and Prime Minister Vasil Radoslavov on behalf of the Kingdom of Bulgaria. The Ottoman–Bulgarian alliance was probably a prerequisite for Bulgaria's joining the Central Powers after Turkey entered the war in November.

The treaty of alliance had seven articles. It was a purely defensive pact: it obligated a signatory to go to war only if the other was attacked by another Balkan country. The two powers also agreed not to attack any other Balkan country without first consulting each other. Article IV left open the possibility of Ottoman troops traversing Bulgarian soil to attack another power. In the event of a conflict without prior consultation they pledged neutrality. Bulgaria promised to notify Turkey of any mobilisation on its part, and in Article V Turkey agreed to negotiate an affirmation of the neutrality of Romania. Furthermore, the treaty was to be kept secret and to last for the duration of the general European war. Although shrouded in secrecy like the treaty with Germany negotiated by Minister of War Enver Pasha on 2 August, the Bulgarian treaty was a more coherent and purposeful document.

After the signing, the Ottomans continued to press for an expanded offensive alliance directed at Russia, but to no avail. On 22 August (9 August O.S.), Grand Vizier Sait Halim rejected the interpretation of the Ottoman–German alliance whereby Turkey was bound to go to war when Germany did. He ordered the government ministers to pursue negotiations in different directions: with Romania, Russia, Greece and France. When negotiations for an anti-Russian alliance with Romania also failed, on 30 August the Ottomans suggested to their German allies that a Bulgarian alliance directed at Serbia and Greece was more feasible. The Germans objected, but the Ottomans sent a colonel to Sofia to begin negotiations with the Bulgarian general staff anyway. Even after entering the war, the Ottomans did not make the Germans aware of the existence of their Bulgarian treaty until 17 December 1914; and the Bulgarians did not actually agree to enter the war on the side of the Central Powers until the Convention of Sofia of 6 September 1915.

== Sources ==
- Erickson, Edward J. (2001). Ordered to Die: A History of the Ottoman Army in the First World War. Westport, CT: Greenwood.
- Silberstein, Gerard E. (1967). "The Serbian Campaign of 1915: Its Diplomatic Background". American Historical Review. 73 (1): 51–69. doi:10.2307/1849028. JSTOR 1849028.
- Silberstein, Gerard E. (1970). The Troubled Alliance: German–Austrian Relations, 1914 to 1917. Lexington: University Press of Kentucky.
- Trumpener, Ulrich (1962). "Turkey's Entry into World War I: An Assessment of Responsibilities". Journal of Modern History. 34 (4): 369–80. doi:10.1086/239180. S2CID 153500703.
- Trumpener, Ulrich (1966). "Liman von Sanders and the German-Ottoman Alliance". Journal of Contemporary History. 1 (4): 179–92. doi:10.1177/002200946600100407. S2CID 154099517.
