= Kaiserreich =

Kaiserreich (lit. 'Kaiser's realm') is a German term for an empire, i.e. a state ruled by an emperor. It was used retrospectively (Deutsches Kaiserreich, German Empire) to refer to the state officially styled German Reich (Deutsches Reich), for the period from 1871 to 1918.

Kaiserreich may also refer to:

- Holy Roman Empire (Heiliges Römisches Reich, 800/962–1806)
- Austrian Empire (Kaisertum Österreich, 1804–1867)
- Austro-Hungarian Empire (Kaiserliche und königliche Monarchie Österreich-Ungarn, 1867–1918)
- German Reich (Deutsches Reich, 1871–1945)
- Kaiserreich: Legacy of the Weltkrieg, a mod for the grand strategy game Hearts of Iron IV
