= Central Powers =

Military coalition in World War I

- 1914–1918
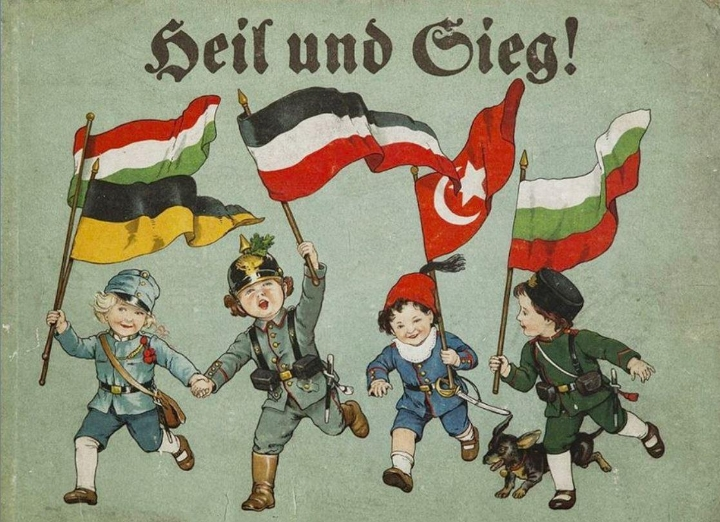
- Children's book cover personifying the four members of the Central Powers

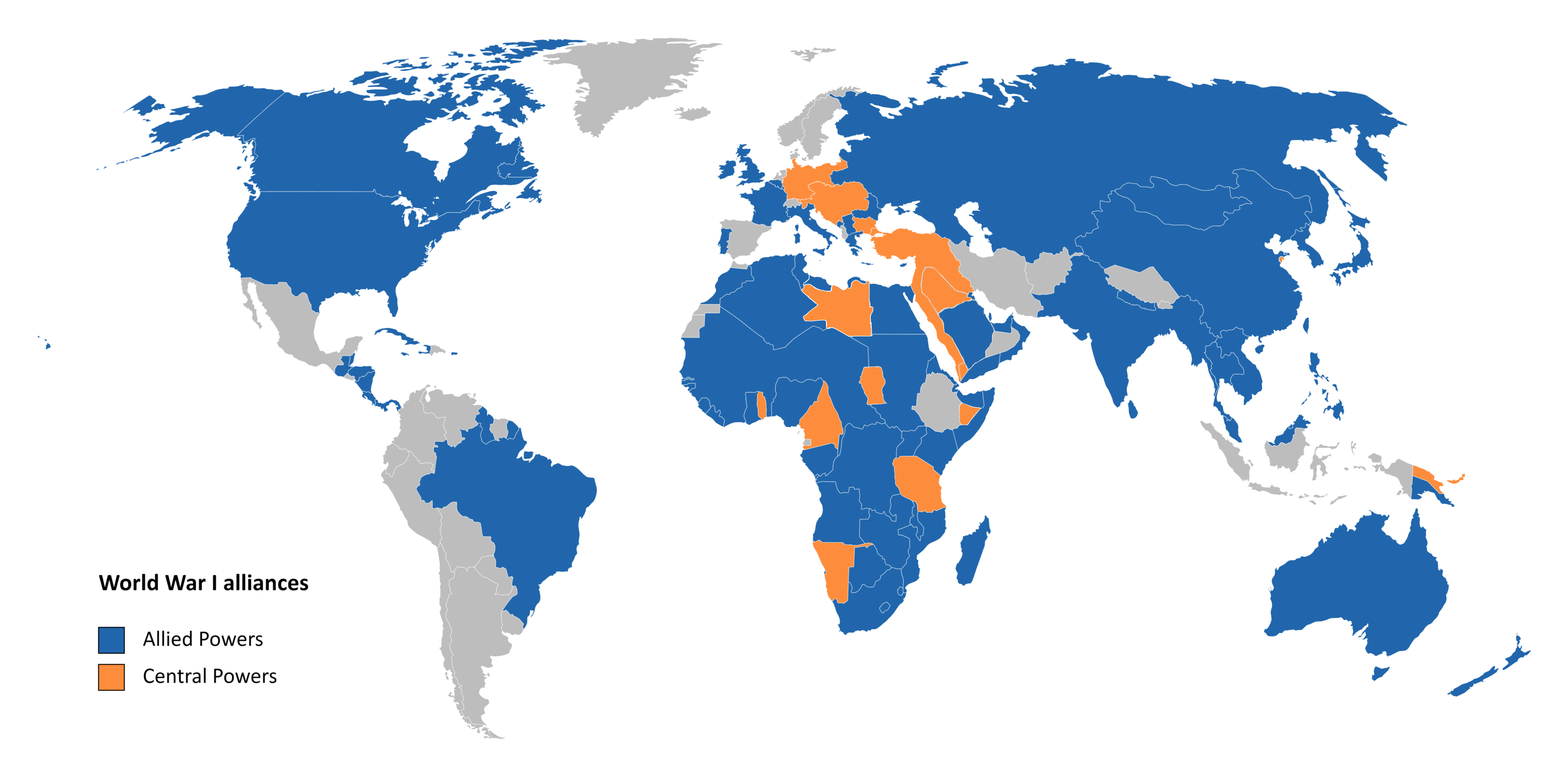
- Central Powers, and their colonies around the world, in orange
- Status: Military alliance
- Key Members: Germany; Austria-Hungary; Ottoman Empire; Bulgaria (from 1915)
- Historical era: World War I
  - Established: 1914
  - Dissolved: 1918
Preceded by
Dual Alliance (1879)
German–Ottoman alliance
Bulgaria–Germany treaty (1915)
Triple Alliance (1882)

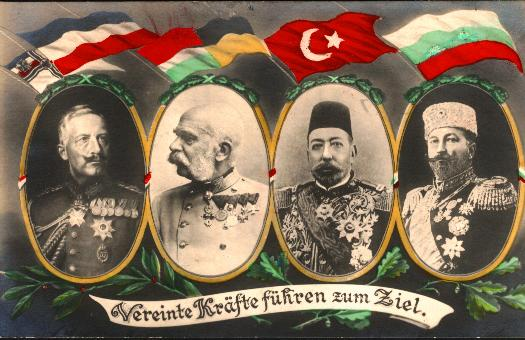
Leaders of the Central Powers (left to right): Wilhelm II of Germany; Franz Joseph I of Austria-Hungary; Mehmed V of the Ottoman Empire; Ferdinand I of Bulgaria; The caption reads: "Vereinte Kräfte führen zum Ziel"; ("United Powers Lead to the Goal")

The Central Powers, also known as the Central Empires, (Note: German: Mittelmächte; Hungarian: Központi hatalmak; Ottoman Turkish: اتفاق دولتري, romanized: İttıfâq Devletleri, Bağlaşma Devletleri; Bulgarian: Централни сили, romanized: Centralni sili) were one of the two main coalitions that fought in World War I (1914–1918). It consisted of the German Empire, Austria-Hungary, the Ottoman Empire, and the Kingdom of Bulgaria; this was also known as the Quadruple Alliance. (Note: German: Vierbund, Hungarian: Központi hatalmak, Ottoman Turkish: دورتلى اِتَّفَاق, romanized: Dörtlü İttıfâq, Bulgarian: Четворен съюз, romanized: Četvoren sūjuz)

The Central Powers' origin was the alliance of Germany and Austria-Hungary in 1879. Despite having nominally joined the Triple Alliance before, Italy did not take part in World War I on the side of the Central Powers and later joined on the side of the Allies. The Ottoman Empire and Bulgaria did not join until after World War I had begun. The Central Powers faced, and were defeated by, the Allied Powers, which themselves had formed around the Triple Entente. They dissolved in 1918 after they lost the war.

== Name ==
The name 'Central Powers' is derived from the location of its member countries. All four were located between the Russian Empire in the east and France and the United Kingdom in the west. The Central Powers too used the name in their languages respectively, with the exception of Turkish, in which the Central Powers were called the دولتري, İttıfâq Devletleri, or Bağlaşma Devletleri, 'Allied States'.

== Collaboration ==
Germany had plans to create a Mitteleuropa economic association. Members would include Austria-Hungary, Germany, and others.

== History ==
=== Alliance formation ===
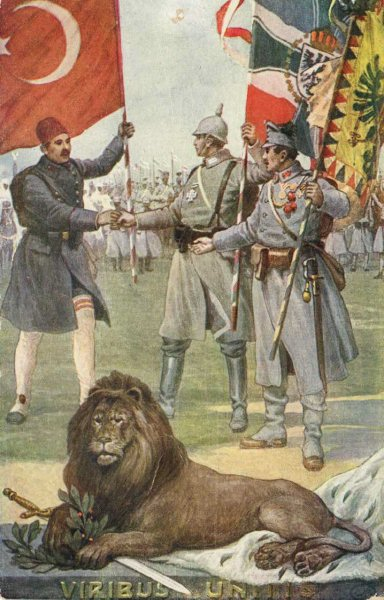
The Ottomans enter the conflict: propaganda postcard.

On 28 July 1914, Austria-Hungary, supported by Germany, declared war on Serbia. Germany then supported its only reliable and dependable ally, the Dual Monarchy, and attempted to localize the Austro-Serbian conflict, without success.

Officially neutral at the outbreak of the conflict, the Ottoman Empire was nevertheless bound to Germany by a secret treaty; for nearly two months, the Ottoman government maneuvered, pursued a policy favorable to German interests, and prepared for war but did not formally commit. The autumn of 1914 was marked by the strategic failure of Germany and the Dual Monarchy, and on 29 October 1914, an action by cruisers sold to the Ottoman Empire in August 1914 prompted the Ottoman Empire's entry into the war alongside the Central Powers.

=== Bulgarian intervention ===
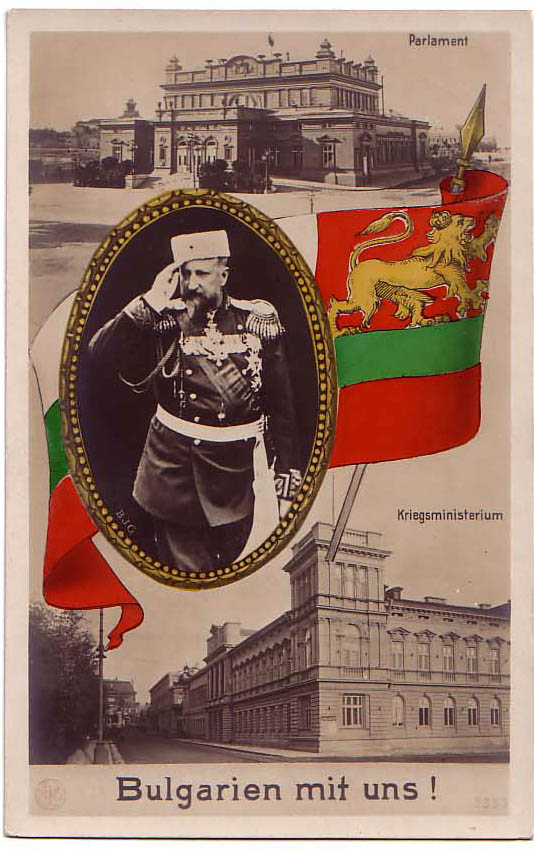
German propaganda postcard magnifying Bulgaria's intervention in the conflict. Inscription: Bulgarien mit uns! Bulgaria with us!.

Throughout 1915, the Bulgarian government was courted by both alliance blocs, but, faced with the distant and hypothetical promises of the Allies, the government aligned with Germany and its allies, signing an alliance treaty with the Central Powers, the Dual Monarchy, and the Ottoman Empire; the signing of this treaty solidified Germany's alliances until 29 September 1918, the date when the armistice between Bulgaria and the Allies took effect.

Thus, King Ferdinand tied his country to the alliance bloc that guaranteed rapid annexations over its Serbian rivals.

Under this convention, the Bulgarian government agreed to subordinate its army to directives issued by the German Emperor.

== Main member states ==
Nation	Date of entry
Austro-Hungarian Empire	28 July 1914
German Empire	1 August 1914
Ottoman Empire	29 October 1914
Tsardom of Bulgaria	14 October 1915

At the start of the war, the Central Powers consisted of the German Empire and the Austro-Hungarian Empire. The Ottoman Empire joined later in 1914, followed by the Tsardom of Bulgaria in 1915.

=== German Empire ===
==== War justifications ====
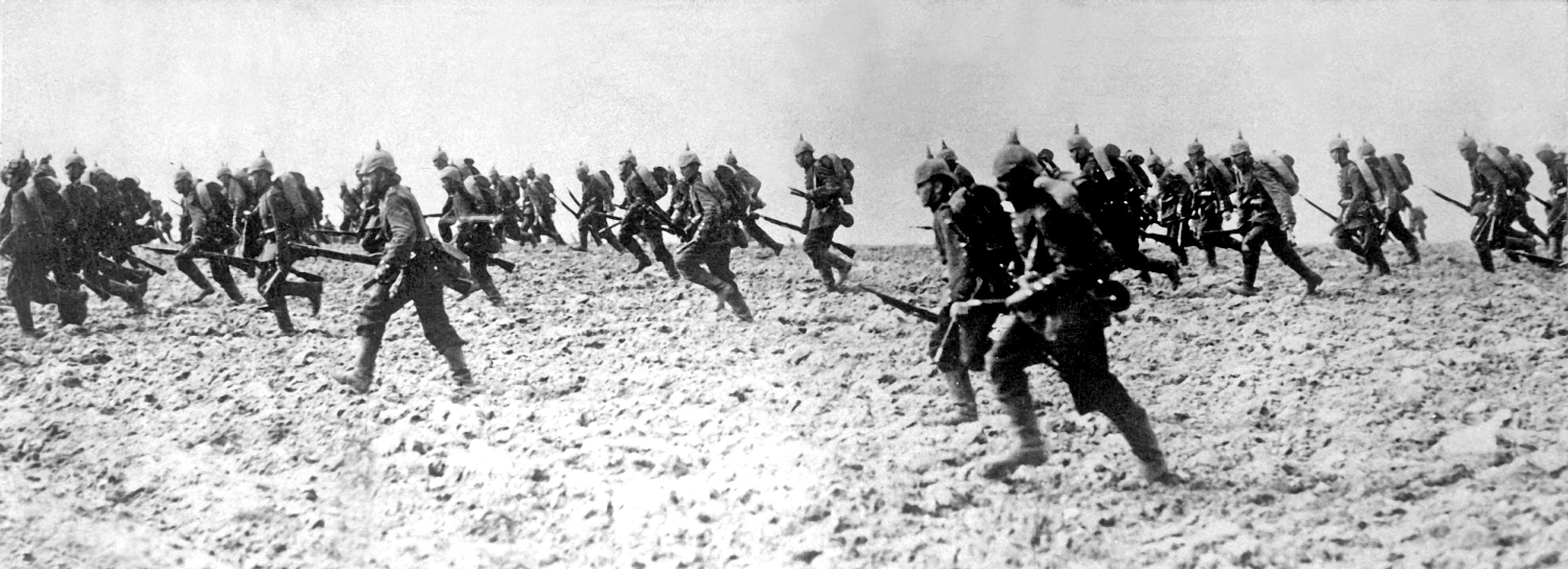
German soldiers on the battlefield in August 1914 on the Western Front, shortly after the outbreak of war

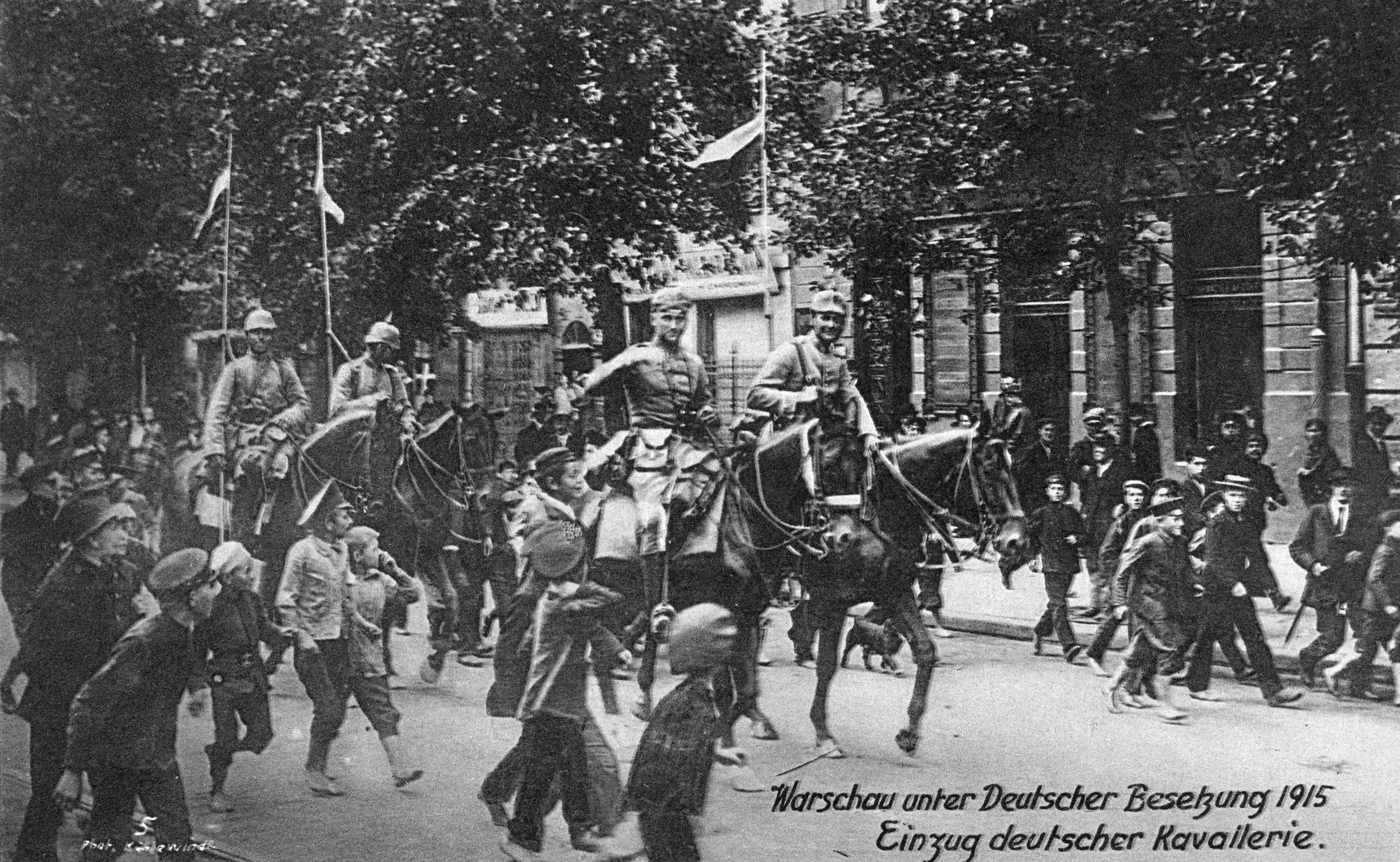
German cavalry entering Warsaw in 1915

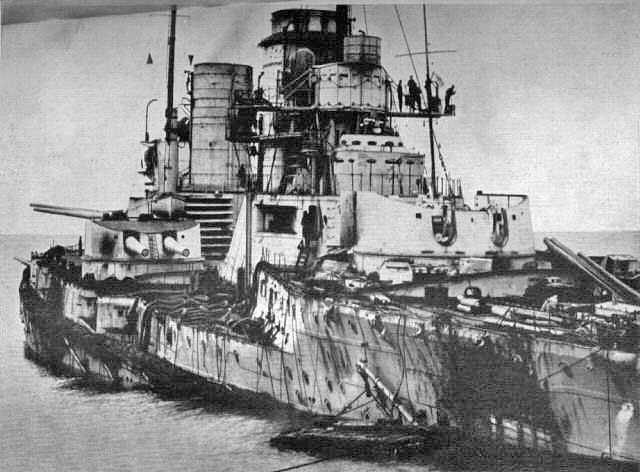
German battlecruiser SMS Seydlitz heavily damaged after the Battle of Jutland

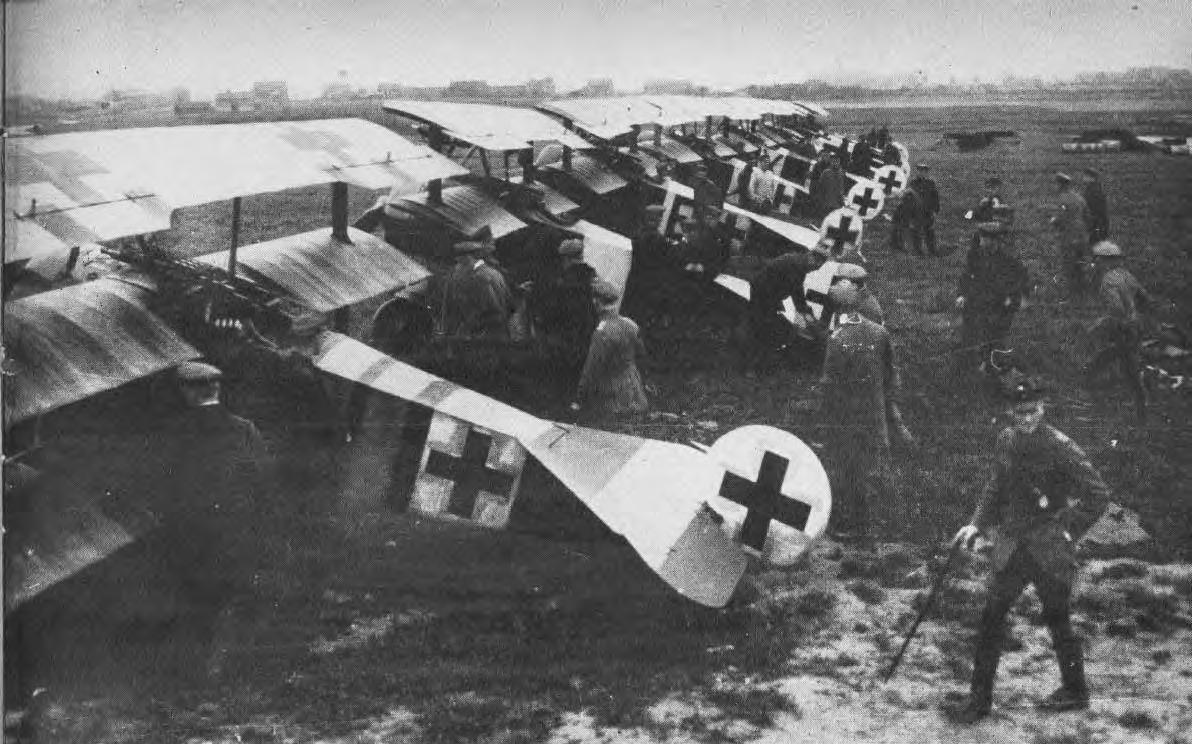
German Fokker Dr.I fighter aircraft of Jasta 26 at Erchin in German-occupied France

In early July 1914, in the aftermath of the assassination of Austro-Hungarian Archduke Franz Ferdinand and faced with the prospect of war between Austria-Hungary and Serbia, Kaiser Wilhelm II and the German government informed the Austro-Hungarian government that Germany would uphold its alliance with Austria-Hungary and defend it from possible Russian intervention if a war between Austria-Hungary and Serbia took place. When Russia enacted a general mobilization, Germany viewed the act as provocative. The Russian government promised Germany that its general mobilization did not mean preparation for war with Germany but was a reaction to the tensions between Austria-Hungary and Serbia. The German government regarded the Russian promise of no war with Germany to be nonsense in light of its general mobilization, and Germany, in turn, mobilized for war. On 1 August, Germany sent an ultimatum to Russia stating that since both Germany and Russia were in a state of military mobilization, an effective state of war existed between the two countries. Later that day, France, an ally of Russia, declared a state of general mobilization.

In August 1914, Germany attacked Russia, citing Russian aggression as demonstrated by the mobilization of the Russian army, which had resulted in Germany mobilizing in response.

After Germany declared war on Russia, France, with its alliance with Russia, prepared a general mobilization in expectation of war. On 3 August 1914, Germany responded to this action by declaring war on France. Germany, facing a two-front war, enacted what was known as the Schlieffen Plan, which involved German armed forces moving through Belgium and swinging south into France and towards the French capital of Paris. This plan was hoped to quickly gain victory against the French and allow German forces to concentrate on the Eastern Front. Belgium was a neutral country and would not accept German forces crossing its territory. Germany disregarded Belgian neutrality and invaded the country to launch an offensive towards Paris. This caused Great Britain to declare war against the German Empire, as the action violated the Treaty of London that both nations signed in 1839 guaranteeing Belgian neutrality.

Subsequently, several states declared war on Germany in late August 1914, with Italy declaring war on Germany in August 1916, the United States in April 1917, and Greece in July 1917.

==== Colonies and dependencies ====
===== Europe =====
The German Empire had incorporated the province of Alsace-Lorraine, after successfully defeating France in the Franco-Prussian War. However, the province was still claimed by French revanchists, leading to its return to France at the Treaty of Versailles.

===== Africa =====
The German Empire was late to colonization, only beginning overseas expansion in the 1870s and 1880s. Colonization was opposed by much of the government, including chancellor Otto von Bismarck, but it became a colonial power after participating in the Berlin Conference. Then, private companies were founded and began settling parts of Africa, the Pacific, and China. Later these groups became German protectorates and colonies.

Cameroon was a German colony existing from 1884 until its complete occupation in 1915. It was ceded to France as a League of Nations mandate at the war's end.

German East Africa was founded in 1885 and expanded to include modern-day Tanzania (except Zanzibar), Rwanda, Burundi, and parts of Mozambique. It was the only German colony to not be fully conquered during the war, with resistance by commander Paul von Lettow-Vorbeck lasting until November 1918. Later it was surrendered to the Allies in 1919 and split between the Belgian Congo, Portuguese Mozambique, and the newly founded colony of Tanganyika.

South West Africa, modern-day Namibia, came under German rule in 1885 and was made into a League of Nations mandate of South Africa following its invasion in 1915.

Togoland, now part of Ghana, was made a German protectorate in 1884. However, after a swift campaign, it was occupied by the Allies in 1915 and divided between French Togoland and British Togoland.

===== Asia =====
The Jiaozhou Bay Leased Territory was a German dependency in East Asia leased from China in 1898. Japanese forces occupied it following the Siege of Tsingtao.

The Austro-Hungarian Empire had a foreign concession in Tianjin which was swiftly invaded by China in 1917. The German concessions in Tianjin and Hankou were also invaded.

===== Pacific =====
German New Guinea was a German protectorate in the Pacific. It was occupied by Australian forces in 1914.

German Samoa had been a German protectorate since the Tripartite Convention. It was occupied by the New Zealand Expeditionary Force in 1914.

=== Austro-Hungarian Empire ===
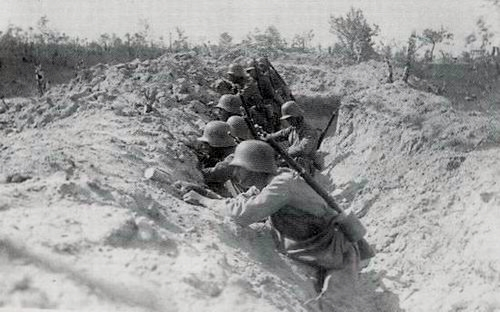
Austro-Hungarian soldiers in a trench on the Italian front

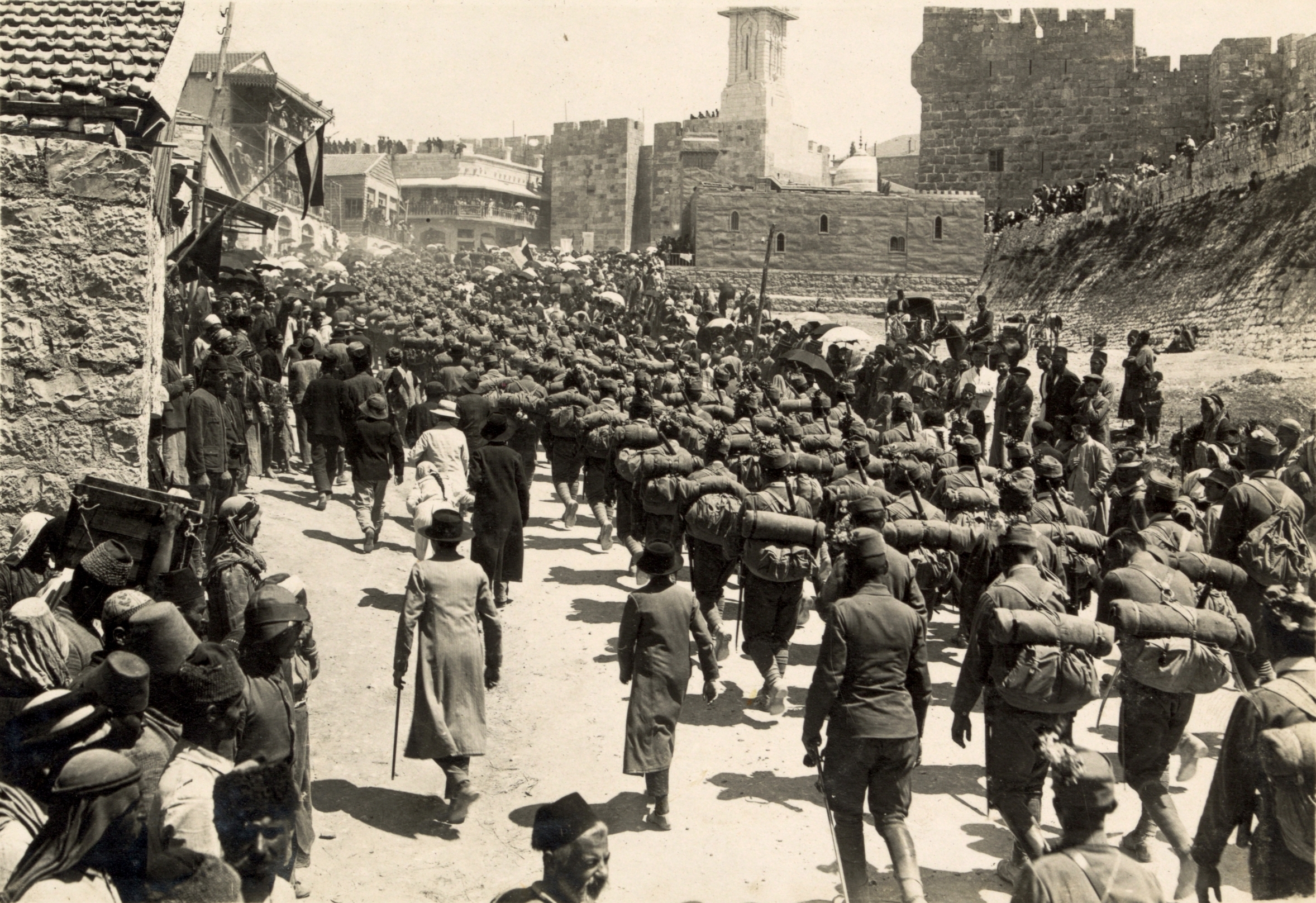
Austro-Hungarian soldiers marching up Mount Zion in Jerusalem in the Ottoman Empire, during the Middle Eastern campaign

==== War justifications ====
Austria-Hungary regarded the assassination of Archduke Franz Ferdinand as having been orchestrated with the assistance of Serbia. The country viewed the assassination as setting a dangerous precedent of encouraging the country's South Slav population to rebel and threaten to tear apart the multinational country. Austria-Hungary sent a formal ultimatum to Serbia demanding a full-scale investigation of Serbian government complicity in the assassination and complete compliance by Serbia in agreeing to the terms demanded by Austria-Hungary. Serbia submitted to accept most of the demands. However, Austria-Hungary viewed this as insufficient and used this lack of full compliance to justify military intervention. These demands have been viewed as a diplomatic cover for an inevitable Austro-Hungarian declaration of war on Serbia.

Russia had warned Austria-Hungary that the Russian government would not tolerate Austria-Hungary invading Serbia. However, with Germany supporting Austria-Hungary's actions, the Austro-Hungarian government hoped that Russia would not intervene and that the conflict with Serbia would remain a regional conflict.

Austria-Hungary's invasion of Serbia resulted in Russia declaring war on the country, and Germany, in turn, declared war on Russia, setting off the beginning of the clash of alliances that resulted in the World War. In support of his German ally, on Thursday, 6 August 1914, Emperor Franz Joseph signed the declaration of war on Russia.

==== Territory ====
Austria-Hungary was internally divided into two states with their own governments, joined through the Habsburg throne. Austria, also known as Cisleithania, contained various duchies and principalities but also the Kingdom of Bohemia, the Kingdom of Dalmatia, and the Kingdom of Galicia and Lodomeria. Hungary (Transleithania) was composed of the Kingdom of Hungary and the Kingdom of Croatia-Slavonia. In Bosnia and Herzegovina, sovereign authority was shared by both Austria and Hungary.

=== Ottoman Empire ===
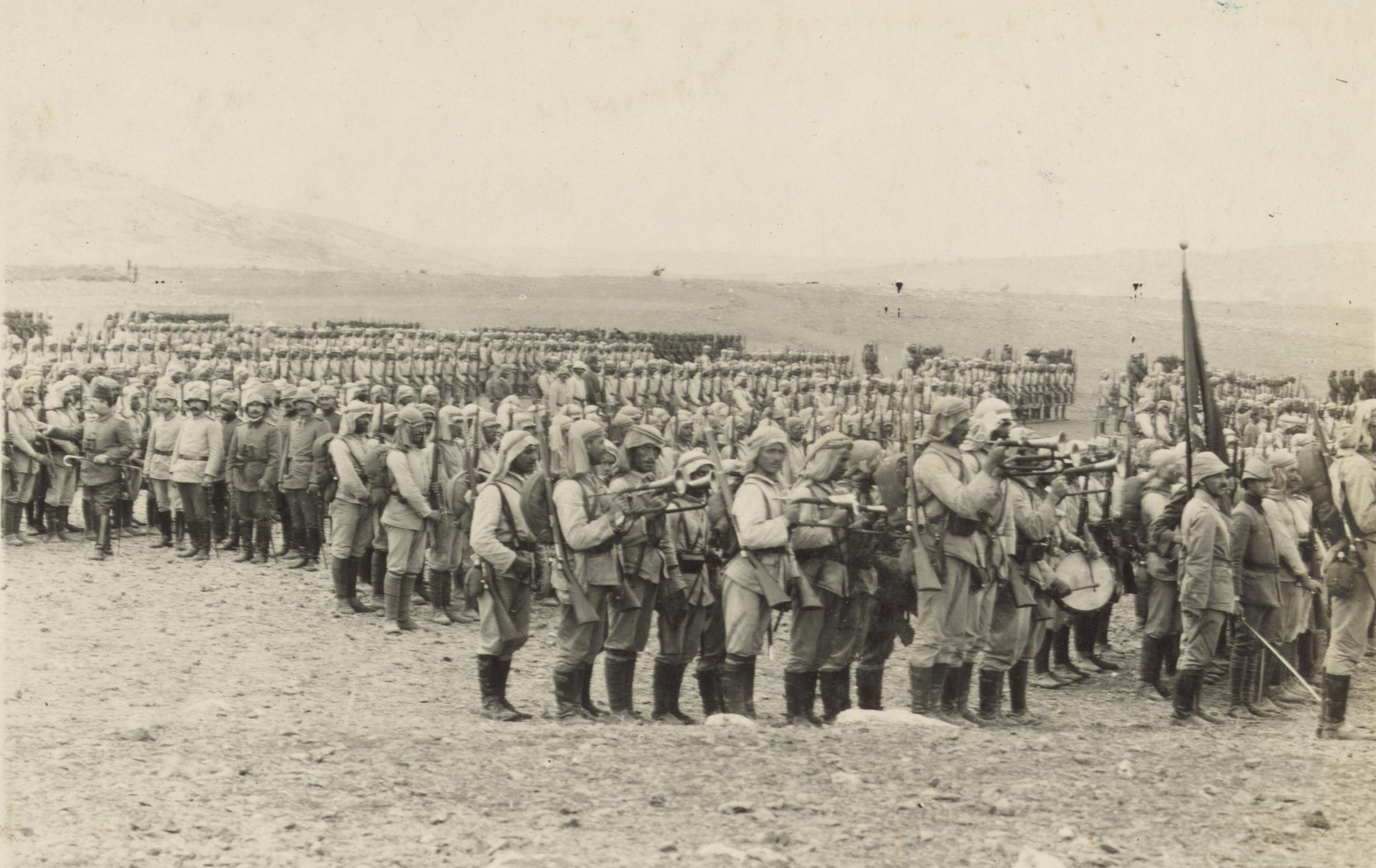
Ottoman soldiers in military preparations for an assault on the Suez Canal in 1914

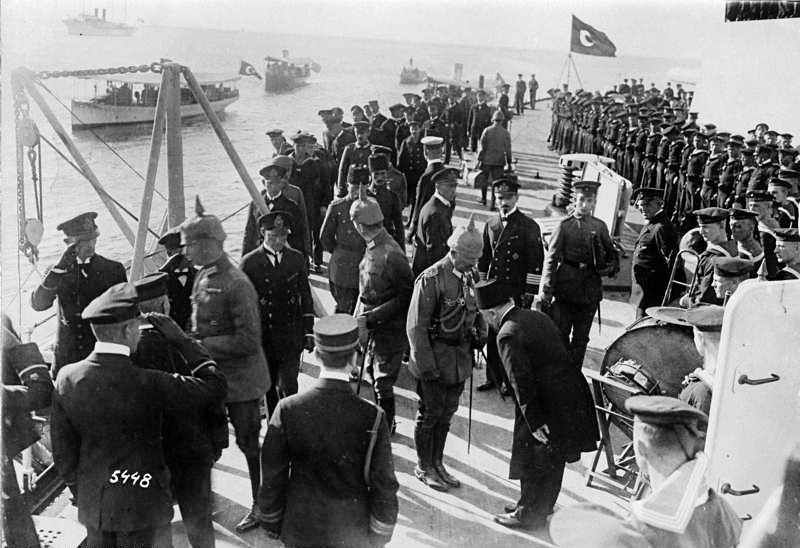
Kaiser Wilhelm II visiting the Turkish cruiser Yavuz Sultan Selim during his stay in Istanbul in October 1917 as a guest of Sultan Mehmed V

==== War justifications ====
The Ottoman Empire joined the war on the side of the Central Powers in November 1914. The Ottoman Empire had gained strong economic connections with Germany through the Berlin-to-Baghdad railway project that was still incomplete at the time. The Ottoman Empire made a formal alliance with Germany signed on 2 August 1914. The alliance treaty expected that the Ottoman Empire would become involved in the conflict in a short amount of time. However, for the first several months of the war, the Ottoman Empire maintained neutrality though it allowed a German naval squadron to enter and stay near the strait of Bosphorus. Ottoman officials informed the German government that the country needed time to prepare for conflict. Germany provided financial aid and weapons shipments to the Ottoman Empire.

After pressure escalated from the German government demanding that the Ottoman Empire fulfill its treaty obligations, or else Germany would expel the country from the alliance and terminate economic and military assistance, the Ottoman government entered the war with the recently acquired cruisers from Germany, along with their own navy, launching a naval raid on the Russian ports of Odessa, Sevastopol, Novorossiysk, Feodosia, and Yalta, thus engaging in military action in accordance with its alliance obligations with Germany. Shortly after, the Triple Entente declared war on the Ottoman Empire.

=== Bulgaria ===
==== War justifications ====
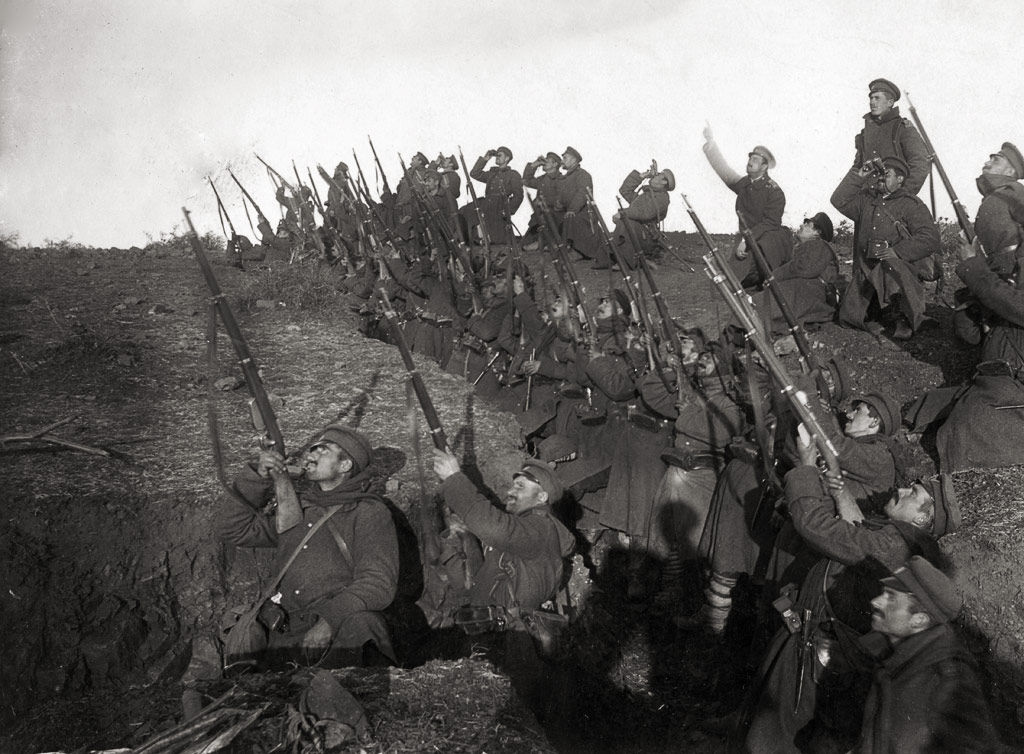
Bulgarian soldiers firing at incoming aircraft

After Bulgaria's defeat in July 1913 at the hands of Serbia, Greece and Romania, it signed a treaty of defensive alliance with the Ottoman Empire on 19 August 1914. Bulgaria was the last country to join the Central Powers, which it did in October 1915 by declaring war on Serbia. It invaded Serbia in conjunction with German and Austro-Hungarian forces.

Bulgaria held claims on the region of Vardar Macedonia then held by Serbia following the Balkan Wars of 1912–1913 and the Treaty of Bucharest (1913). As a condition of entering the war on the side of the Central Powers, Bulgaria was granted the right to reclaim that territory.

== Co-belligerents ==
Flag of the South African Republic

=== South African Republic ===
In opposition to offensive operations by the Union of South Africa, which had joined the war, Boer army officers of what is now known as the Maritz Rebellion "refounded" the South African Republic in September 1914. Germany assisted the rebels, with some operating in and out of the German colony of German South-West Africa. The rebels were all defeated or captured by South African government forces by 4 February 1915.

=== Senussi Order ===
Flag of the Senussi

The Senussi Order was a Muslim political-religious tariqa (Sufi order) and clan in Libya, previously under Ottoman control, which had been lost to Italy in 1912. In 1915, they were courted by the Ottoman Empire and Germany, and Grand Senussi Ahmed Sharif as-Senussi declared jihad and attacked the Italians in Libya and the British in Egypt in the Senussi Campaign.

=== Sultanate of Darfur ===
In 1915, the Sultanate of Darfur renounced allegiance to the Sudanese government and aligned with the Ottomans. They were able to contact them via the Senussi. Prior to this they were a British ally. The Anglo-Egyptian Darfur Expedition preemptively invaded to prevent an attack on Sudan. A small force was sent after the sultan and he was killed in action in November 1916. The invasion ended with an Anglo-Egyptian victory in November 1916.

=== Zaian Confederation ===
The Zaian Confederation began to fight against France in the Zaian War to prevent French expansion into Morocco. The fighting lasted from 1914 and continued after the First World War ended, to 1921. The Central Powers (mainly the Germans) began to attempt to incite unrest to hopefully divert French resources from Europe.

=== Dervish State ===
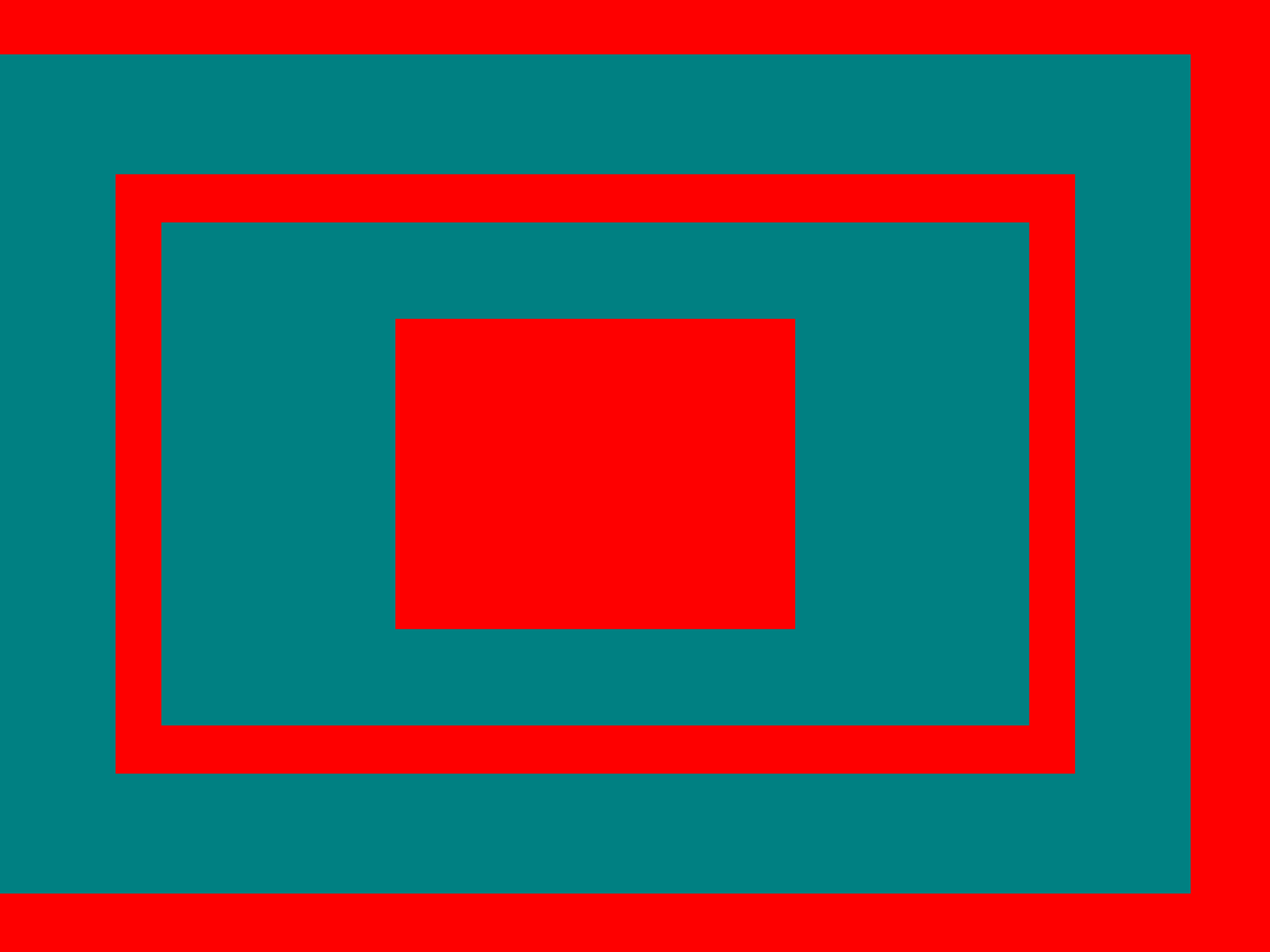
Flag of the Dervish

The Dervish State fought against the British, Ethiopian, Italian, and French Empires between 1896 and 1925. During World War I, the Dervish State received many supplies from the German and Ottoman Empires to carry on fighting the Allies. However, aerial raids eventually led to its collapse in 1920.

=== Kathiri Sultanate ===
Starting in 1915, al-Mansur b. Ghalib al-Kathiri, the Kathiri Sultan, corresponded with ‘Ali Sa‘id Basha, the Ottoman military commander at Lahej through the former's envoy, Bin ‘Ubaydillah. al-Mansur hoped to gain Ottoman support to defeat his historical rival, the British-aligned Qu'aiti Sultanate, and rule Hadhramaut as a sultan under Ottoman suzerainty. Basha encouraged al-Mansur to ally himself with the Ottoman Empire, but could not make realistic promises of military support. By October 1917, open conflict had broken out between the Kathiri and the Qu'aiti; on the 13th, James Stewart, the resident at Aden, reported that the Qu'aiti had destroyed two Kathiri dhars (military posts) in a recent engagement near Seiyun. On 22 December 1917, it was reported that the Kathiris had attacked Qu'aiti troops at Bab-es-Sir.

Contrary to their sultan, al-Mansur's subjects wished to maintain good relations with Britain and considered the conflict contrary to their economic interests. Facing increasing domestic pressure and an absence of Ottoman military support, al-Mansur lacked the political capital to continue hostilities. On 7 June 1918, al-Mansur signed the Aden agreement, placing the Kathiri Sultanate under Qu'aiti sovereignty and, by extension, subsuming it into the Aden Protectorate. al-Ghurfa, under the influence of the Bin 'Abdat dynasty, rejected the Aden agreement and seceded from the Kathiri Sultanate, remaining independent until 1945.

=== Client states ===
Both the Ottomans and Germans had client states, they are listed below.

Client state	State in charge
Poland	Germany
Lithuania	Germany
Belarus	Germany
Ukraine	Germany
Crimea	Germany
Courland and Semigallia	Germany
United Baltic Duchy	Germany
Georgia	Germany
Don Republic	Germany
Finland	Germany
Kuban People's Republic	Germany
Jabal Shammar	Ottoman Empire
Mountain Republic	Ottoman Empire
Azerbaijan Democratic Republic	Ottoman Empire
Republic of Aras	Ottoman Empire
Qatar	Ottoman Empire
Yemen	Ottoman Empire

== Nations supported by the Central Powers ==
States listed in this section were not officially members of the Central Powers. Still, during the war, they cooperated with one or more Central Powers members on a level that makes their neutrality disputable.

=== Ethiopia ===
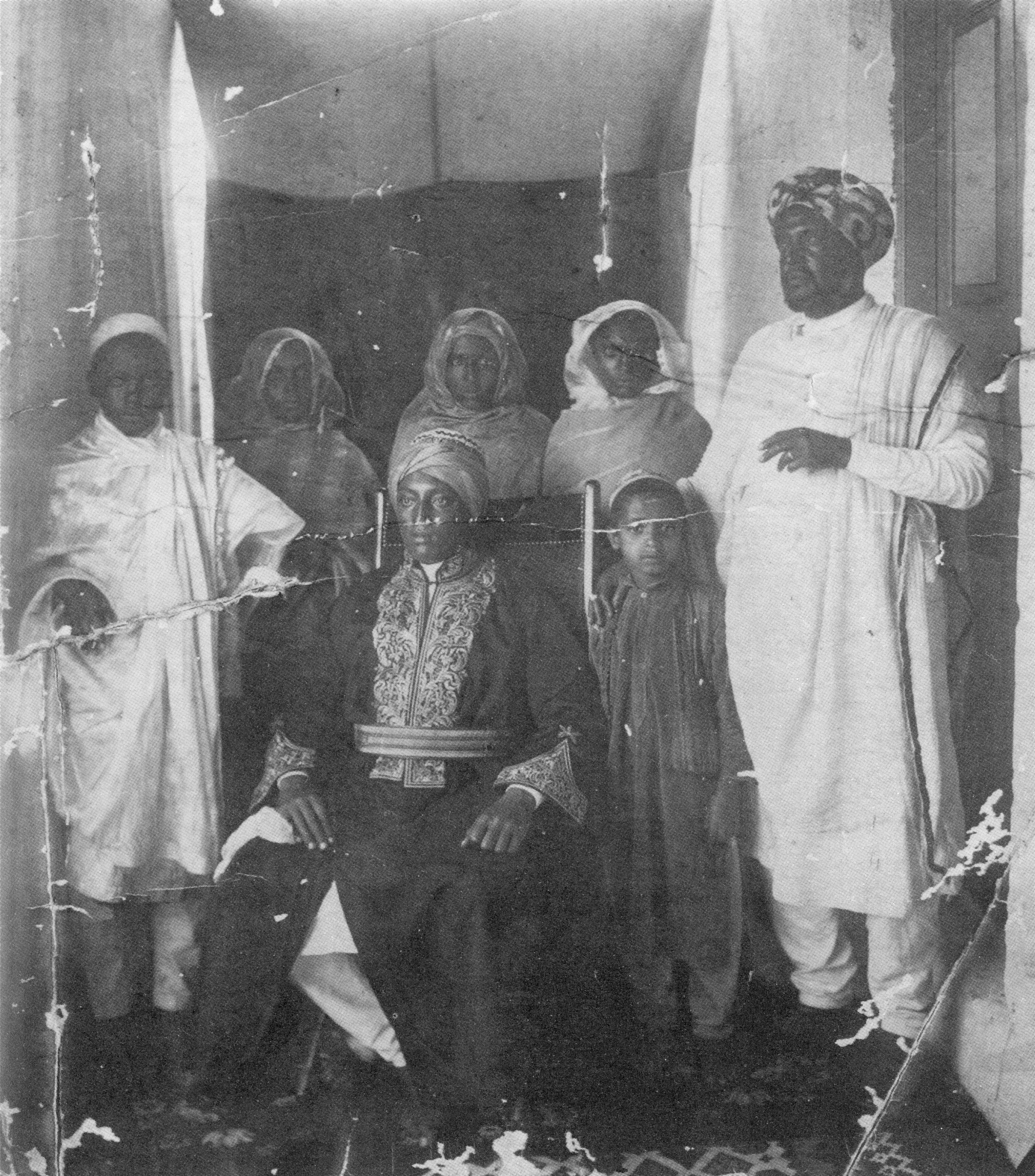
Lij Iyasu, ruler of Ethiopia until 1916 pictured in his Ottoman-style turban with governor Abdullahi Sadiq

The Ethiopian Empire was officially neutral throughout World War I but widely suspected of sympathy for the Central Powers between 1915 and 1916. At the time, Ethiopia was one of only two fully independent states in Africa (the other being Liberia) and a major power in the Horn of Africa. Its ruler, Lij Iyasu, was widely suspected of harbouring pro-Islamic sentiments and being sympathetic to the Ottoman Empire. The German Empire also attempted to reach out to Iyasu, dispatching several unsuccessful expeditions to the region to attempt to encourage it to collaborate in an Arab Revolt-style uprising in East Africa. One of the unsuccessful expeditions was led by Leo Frobenius, a celebrated ethnographer and personal friend of Kaiser Wilhelm II. Under Iyasu's directions, Ethiopia probably supplied weapons to the Muslim Dervish rebels during the Somaliland Campaign of 1915 to 1916, indirectly helping the Central Powers' cause.

The Allies jointly pressured the aristocracy for the designated emperor's removal on 10 September 1916 stating he was a threat to both the Allies and Ethiopia. Fearing the rising influence of Iyasu and the Ottoman Empire, the Christian nobles of Ethiopia conspired against Iyasu. Iyasu was first excommunicated by the Ethiopian Orthodox Patriarch and eventually deposed in a coup d'état on 27 September 1916. Zewditu, was installed on the throne and Ras Tafari Makonnen, her regent, was less inclined to favour the Ottomans.

=== Liechtenstein ===
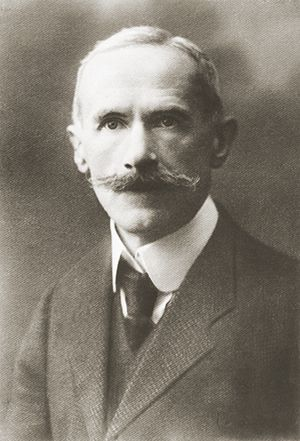
Leopold Freiherr von Imhof, Governor of Liechtenstein from 1914 to 1918

Liechtenstein was officially neutral throughout World War I, though the general population and government was supportive of the Central Powers, particularly Austria-Hungary, with which the two countries had been in a customs union since 1852. However, from September 1914 food deliveries from Austria-Hungary began to decrease, which quickly soured the initial war support. By 1916 all food deliveries from Austria-Hungary had ceased, which forced Liechtenstein to seek closer ties with Switzerland in order to ensure food deliveries continued. From 1916, Liechtenstein was embargoed by the Entente countries due to its connections with the Central Powers; this caused mass unemployment in the country. The government remained sympathetic to the Central Powers until 7 November 1918, when the November 1918 Liechtenstein putsch took place and a new government took power.

=== Kingdom of Greece ===
The Kingdom of Greece was in a political dispute with Venizelists. The Central Powers supported the royalists until King Constantine's abdication in 1917.

=== Romania ===
Following their armistice with the Central Powers, Romania was involved in the Russian Civil War against both the Whites and the Reds. Romania fought alongside the Central Powers until it rejoined the war against them on 10 November 1918.

=== Kelantan ===
Kelantanese rebels were supported by the Ottoman and German Empires during their anti-colonial uprising against the British Empire in 1915.

== Non-state combatants ==
Other movements supported the efforts of the Central Powers for their own reasons, such as the radical Irish Nationalists who launched the Easter Rising in Dublin in April 1916; they referred to their "gallant allies in Europe". However, most Irish Nationalists supported the British and allied war effort up until 1916, when the Irish political landscape was changing. In 1914, Józef Piłsudski was permitted by Germany and Austria-Hungary to form independent Polish legions. Piłsudski wanted his legions to help the Central Powers defeat Russia and then side with France and the UK and win the war with them. Below is a list of these non-state combatants.

- Ahl Haydara Mansur
- Albanian Muslim rebels
- IMRO
- Irish Citizen Army
- Irish Republican Brotherhood
- Irish Volunteers
- White Guard (Finland)
- Polish Legions

== Armistice and treaties ==
Bulgaria signed an armistice with the Allies on 29 September 1918, following a successful Allied advance in Macedonia. The Ottoman Empire followed suit on 30 October 1918 in the face of British and Arab gains in Palestine and Syria. Austria and Hungary concluded ceasefires separately during the first week of November following the disintegration of the Habsburg Empire and the Italian offensive at Vittorio Veneto; Germany signed the armistice ending the war on the morning of 11 November 1918 after the Hundred Days Offensive, and a succession of advances by New Zealand, Australian, Canadian, Belgian, British, French and US forces in north-eastern France and Belgium. There was no unified treaty ending the war; the Central Powers were dealt with in separate treaties.

Central Powers by date of armistice and Surrender
Country	Name of Armistice	Date
Sanusiyya	Modus vivendi of Acroma	16 April 1917
Bulgaria	Armistice of Salonica	29 September 1918
Ottoman Empire	Armistice of Mudros	30 October 1918
Austria-Hungary (Austrian Portion)	Armistice of Villa Giusti	4 November 1918
Germany	Armistice of Compiègne	11 November 1918
Kingdom of Hungary	Armistice of Belgrade	13 November 1918
German East Africa	Surrender at Abercorn	25 November 1918

Central Powers treaties
Country	Treaty of	Results	Date signed
Weimar Republic (Germany)	Versailles	Germany was required to demilitarize the Rhineland, to reduce their army to 100,000 men, and the navy to 15,000 sailors, and to pay 132 billion gold marks (US$33 billion). Tanks, submarines, and an air force were all forbidden.	28 June 1919
Republic of German-Austria (Austria)	Saint-Germain		10 September 1919
Bulgaria	Neuilly		27 November 1919
Hungary	Trianon	Hungary lost 72% of its total land area, and 31% of ethnic Hungarians became minorities in the neighboring countries (Romania, Czechoslovakia, Yugoslavia, Austria).	4 June 1920
Ottoman Empire/Turkey	Sèvres/Lausanne	The Treaty of Sèvres caused resentment among the Turkish populace of the Ottoman Empire and resulted in the outbreak of the Turkish War of Independence, after which the Treaty of Lausanne was signed.	10 August 1920/24 August 1923

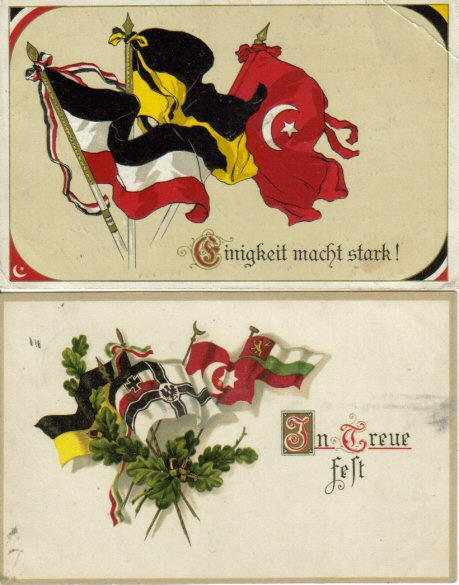
A postcard depicting the flags of the Central Powers' countries

Poster for a 1916 charity bazaar raising funds for widows and orphans of the Central Power states; the poster appears to deliberately omit the name of the Ottoman Empire/Turkey and its flag (instead showing a plain red banner)

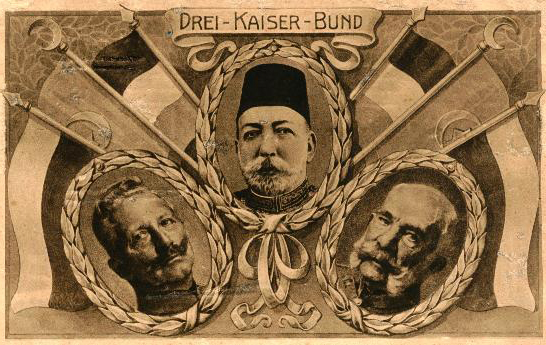
The leaders of the Central Powers in 1914

== Leaders ==
Leaders of the Central Powers
Portrait	Leader	Title	Time period
	Franz Joseph I	Emperor of Austria and Apostolic King of Hungary	1848–1916
	Karl I	Emperor of Austria and Apostolic King of Hungary	1916–1918
	Wilhelm II	German Emperor	1888–1918
	Mehmed V	Sultan of the Ottoman Empire	1909–1918
	Mehmed VI	Sultan of the Ottoman Empire	1918–1922
	Ferdinand I	Tsar of Bulgaria	1887–1918
	Ali Dinar	Sultan of Darfur	1899–1916
	Manie Maritz	Leader of the Maritz Rebellion	1914–1915
	Mohammed Abdullah Hassan	Emir of the Dervish State	1896–1920
	Ahmed Sharif as-Senussi	Leader of the Senussi	1902–1933
	Saud bin Abdulaziz	Emir of Jabal Shammar	1908–1920
	Fatali Khan Khoyski	Prime Minister of Azerbaijan	1918–1919
	Pavlo Skoropadskyi	Hetman of Ukraine	1918–1918

== Statistics ==
Proportions of Central Powers' fatalities

Economic statistics of the Central Powers (Note: All figures presented are for the year 1913.)
Country		Population (millions)	Area (million km^{2})	GDP ($ billion)	GDP per capita ($)
Germany (1914)	Mainland	67.0	0.5	244.3	3,648
Germany (1914)	Colonies	10.7	3.0	6.4	601
Germany (1914)	Total	77.7	3.5	250.7	3,227
Austria-Hungary (1914)		50.6	0.6	100.5	1,980
Ottoman Empire (1914)		23.0	1.8	25.3	1,100
Bulgaria (1915)		4.8	0.1	7.4	1,527
Total		156.1	6.0	383.9	2,459
Allies, total, November 1914		793.3	67.5	1,096.5	
UK, France and Russia only		259.0	22.6	622.8	

Military statistics of the Central Powers
Country	Mobilized	Killed in action	Wounded	Missing in action	Total casualties	Casualties as % of total force mobilized
Germany	13,250,000	2,037,000 (13.65%)	6,267,143	1,152,800	9,456,943	71%
Austria-Hungary	7,800,000	1,494,200 (11.82%)	3,620,000	2,200,000	7,314,200	94%
Ottoman Empire	3,056,000	771,884 (10.84%)	763,163	250,000	1,785,000	60%
Bulgaria	1,200,000	75,844 (6.32%)	153,390	27,029	255,263	21%
Total	25,257,321	4,378,928	10,803,533	3,629,829	18,812,290	75%

== Disintegration ==
=== Waning solidarity ===
As the war lasted longer than expected, Germany's allies gradually sought to remove themselves from its sphere of its influence. Thus, the death of Francis Joseph and the accession of his successor Charles marked a paradigm shift in relations between Germany and the Dual Monarchy. Indeed, the young emperor quickly sought to distance himself from the policy pursued in Germany: this distancing was materialized by the transfer of the Austro-Hungarian Armeeoberkommando, the high command, from Teschen, near Pless, the seat of the OHL, to Baden, near Vienna; this move was intended, according to its architects, to loosen Germany's grip on the Dual Monarchy.

Moreover, from 1916, Dual Monarchy leaders sought to exit the conflict at all costs, aware of the risks of disintegration if the war continued.

Finally, the peace treaties of early 1918 led to the fall of the Bulgarian government of Vasil Radoslavov and its replacement by Aleksandar Malinov, less loyal to the 1915 alliance. Feeling cheated by the division of the 1915 and 1916 conquests, Bulgarian leaders fueled discontent with the conflict, funding press campaigns unfavorable to Germany and the Dual Monarchy.

=== Bulgarian defection ===
Under the command of Louis Franchet d'Espèrey, Franco-Serbian troops launched a breakthrough offensive against Bulgarian units weakened by privations, plagued by desertions, pacifist propaganda, and exhausted by three years of positional warfare in Macedonia. This breakthrough quickly shattered the Macedonian front and dismantled the Bulgarian position through the Maneuver of Uskub by Franco-Serbian troops.

Faced with this alarming situation, the German high command ordered the deployment of occupation troops from Ukraine to the Balkans and the organization of a front south of Niš. Moreover, on 28 September 1918, Erich Ludendorff ordered the commander of the few German divisions positioned in the Balkans to redeploy around Sofia to ensure Bulgaria's continued commitment alongside its Quadruple Alliance partners; this attempt to counter Bulgaria's unilateral initiative failed immediately due to the speed of the armistice negotiations between Allied plenipotentiaries and Bulgarian representatives.

== See also ==
- Central Powers intervention in the Russian Civil War
- Color books, transcripts of official documents released by each nation early in the war
- Diplomatic history of World War I
- Home front during World War I covering all major countries
- International relations (1814–1919)
- Axis powers
- Kaiserreich (disambiguation)
- Spa Conferences (First World War)
