= Reşid Pasha =

Reşid Pasha, Reşit Pasha, Reshid Pasha or Rashid Pasha may refer to:

== People ==
- Reşid Mehmed Pasha (1780–1839), Ottoman general and Grand Vizier
- Mustafa Reşid Pasha (1800–1858), Ottoman statesman and architect of the Tanzimat reforms
- Mehmed Rashid Pasha (ca. 1825–1871), reformist Ottoman governor of Syria Vilayet
- Reşid Akif Pasha (1863–1920), Ottoman statesman and governor
- Ahmet Reşit Rey (1870–1956), Ottoman statesman and Turkish member of parliament
- Reshid Pasha, Ottoman governor of the Basra Vilayet administrative district

== Other uses ==
- Reşid Pasha Palace, now housing the Baltalimanı Osteopathic Hospital, in Baltalimanı, Istanbul, Turkey
