= Mehmed Hâdî Pasha =

Ottoman politician (c. 1861–1932)

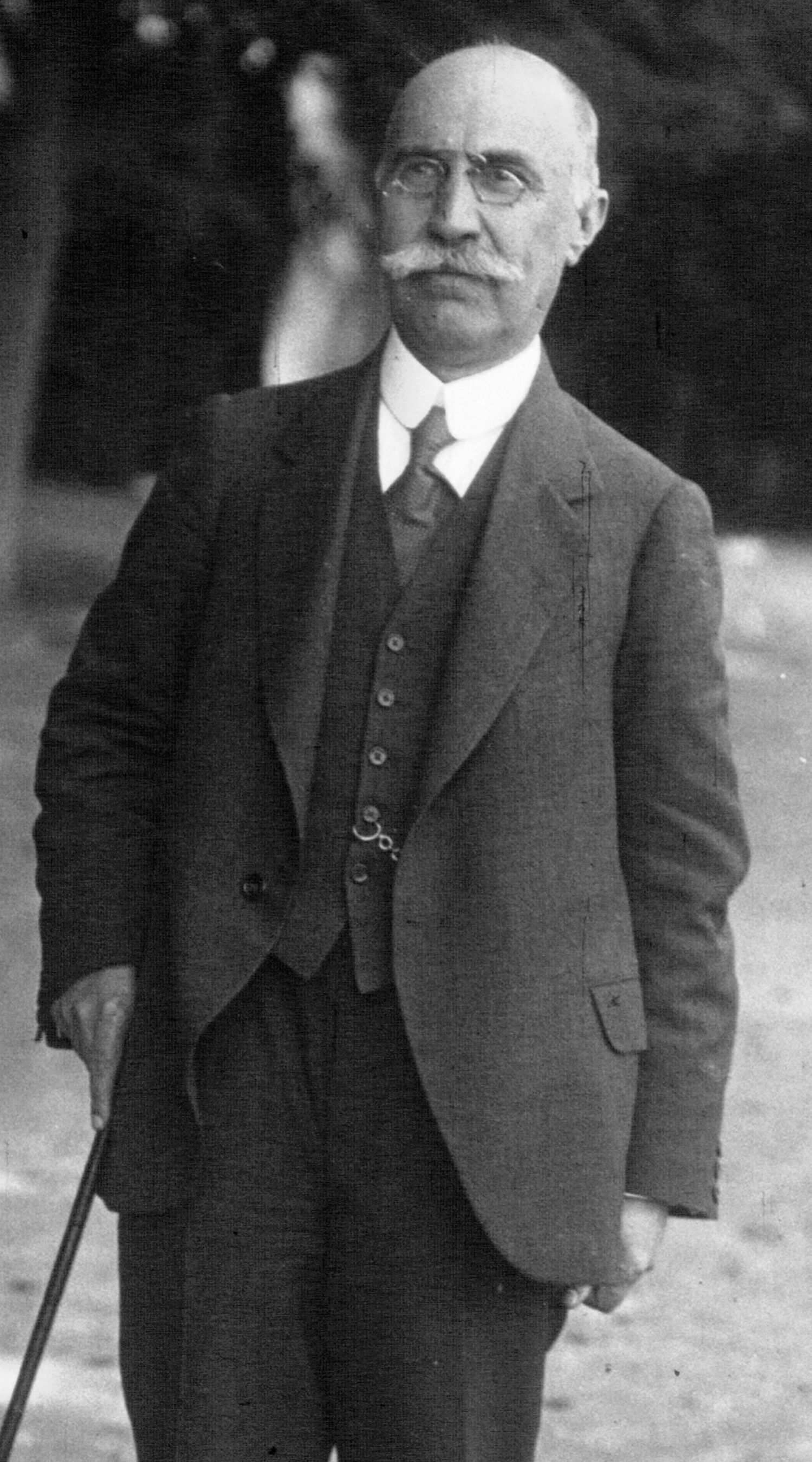

Personal details
- Born: c. 1861 Baghdad, Ottoman Empire
- Died: 1932 Berat, Albanian Kingdom
- Party: Freedom and Accord Party
- Occupation: Politician

Mehmed Hâdî Pasha (Turkish: Bağdatlı Mehmet Hâdî Paşa; c. 1859–1932) was an Ottoman general, statesman, and a member of the Freedom and Accord Party.

Early in his military career, he was posted to Yemen Vilayet, where he led the campaign against El-Idrisi's (and other) uprisings. He was decorated for his service there, and emerged with the rank of General and the title of Pasha.

In 1909, Hadi Pasha was declared governor (vali) of Kosovo Vilayet.

He was General Chief-of-Staff during the Balkan Wars of 1912–13 during which he successfully defended Istanbul against the Bulgarians. He retired from the Ottoman Military before the First World War and served as a Senator and a cabinet minister twice (for Education and Agriculture).

Hadi Pasha led the Ottoman delegation to Paris in 1920 to negotiate and there he signed the controversial Treaty of Sèvres, along with Reşat Halis and Rıza Tevfik.

Because of his role in this, Hadi Pasha was considered one of the 150 persona non grata by the Republic of Turkey, along with the other signatories of the treaty and the Ottoman imperial family itself. He was thereafter exiled to Berat, Albania, where he died in 1932.
