= Mehmet Ali Gerede =

Interior Minister
- In office 1919–1919
- Monarch: Mehmed VI
- Prime Minister: Damat Ferid Pasha
- Preceded by: Ahmet Reşit Rey
- Succeeded by: Ali Kemal

Personal details
- Died: 16 October 1939 Istanbul

Mehmet Ali Bey, later Mehmet Ali Gerede, was a Turkish politician who was one of the last Ministers of the Interior of the Ottoman Empire.

== Biography ==
He was the son of Police Minister Kâmil Pasha, and Hafize Hanım, a Kurd hailing from Batman. He was married with Eleanor Louisa Bendon (Nilüfer Gerede) from Great Britain.

Mehmet Ali Bey rejoined the Freedom and Accord Party when it was refuonded in 1919. He was elected honorary member of the English Friendship Society in 1920. After the proclamation of the Republic, he was deported along with other 150 personae non gratae of Turkey. He lived from 1924 until 1938 in exile in Paris, where he began to publish a newspaper with the name La République Enchainé ("The Chained Republic"). The first issue of the newspaper in 1930 was an attack on Mustafa Kemal Atatürk. Four days before Atatürk's death in 1938, Mehmed Ali took advantage of an amnesty and returned to Turkey together with his family.

He took the adopted surname "Gerede" after the 1934 Surname Law.

Mehmet Ali Bey died in Istanbul on 16 October 1939.
