= Salih Hulusi Pasha =

Grand Vizier of the Ottoman Empire (1920)

Grand Vizier of the Ottoman Empire
- In office 8 March 1920 – 5 April 1920
- Monarch: Mehmed VI
- Preceded by: Ali Rıza Pasha
- Succeeded by: Damat Ferid Pasha

Minister of War
- In office 28 April 1909 – 12 January 1910
- Monarch: Mehmed V
- Preceded by: Ali Riza Pasha
- Succeeded by: Mahmud Şevket Pasha

Minister of Interior
- In office June 1922 – 4 November 1922
- Monarch: Mehmed VI
- Prime Minister: Ahmet Tevfik Pasha
- Preceded by: Ali Riza Pasha

Personal details
- Born: 1864 Istanbul, Ottoman Empire
- Died: 1939 (aged 74–75) Istanbul, Turkey

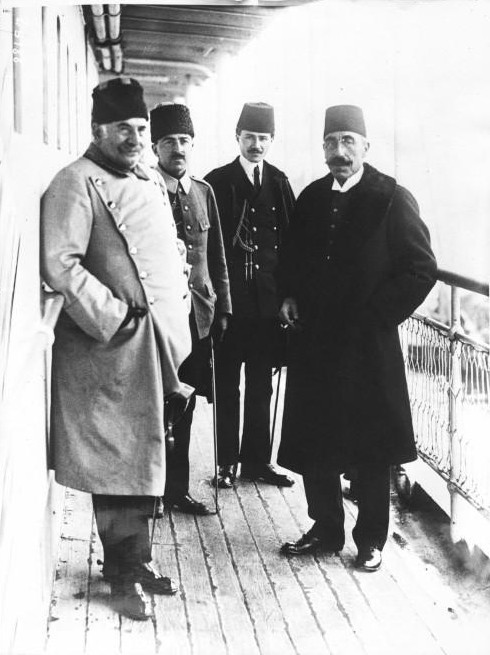
Salih Hulusi Pasha (right) with Nazim Pasha, before his departure for the London Conference of 1912–1913

Salih Hulusi Pasha (Ottoman Turkish: صالح خلوصي پاشا; Adyghe: Къэрзэч Сэлихь-Хьулуси, romanized: Qərzəç Səlih-Hulusi; 1864–1939), known as Salih Hulusi Kezrak after the Turkish Surname Law of 1934, was one of the last Grand Viziers of the Ottoman Empire, under the reign of the last Ottoman Sultan Mehmed VI, between 8 March 1920 and 2 April 1920. Since he had been unable to form a government, and as part of the chain of events following the occupation of Istanbul by the Allies (particularly the arrests of a number of deputies of the Ottoman Parliament), he was dismissed from office by the sultan under foreign pressure on 2 April. His dismissal was to be followed by the official closure of the Parliament itself on 5 April, thus putting an end to the Second Constitutional Era of the Ottoman Empire.

In terms of effective shaping of policies by the remaining Ottoman state structure, his office (as well as his predecessor Ali Rıza Pasha's) are usually considered as mere intervals between the two offices of Damat Ferid Pasha, the signatory of the Treaty of Sèvres.

Prior to his premiership, Salih Hulusi Pasha held the office of the Minister of the Marine under two preceding governments and also under his successor Ahmed Tevfik Pasha. At a time when Turkey had two governments, he was often charged with contacts with the rising Ankara government set up by Mustafa Kemal Pasha. With the end of the Ottoman monarchy, Hulusi Salih Pasha retired from politics. Later he joined the military and played a significant role in the crushing of the Kurdish lead Ararat rebellion in 1930. Having adopted the surname "Kezrak" under the 1934 Surname Law in Turkey, Hulusi Pasha died in 1939 in Istanbul.

Kezrak's father, Ferik Dilaver Pasha, was a Circassian Lieutenant general in the Ottoman Navy, who published Dilaver Pasha Regulations during his service as Minister of Mining in 1865.

== See also ==
- List of Ottoman grand viziers
- Second Constitutional Era (Ottoman Empire)

Political offices
Preceded by Ali Rıza Pasha	Grand Vizier of the Ottoman Empire; 8 March 1920 – 5 April 1920	Succeeded by Damat Ferid Pasha
