= Ali Rıza Pasha =

Grand Vizier of the Ottoman Empire from 1919 to 1920

Ali Rıza علی رضا پاشا Pasha
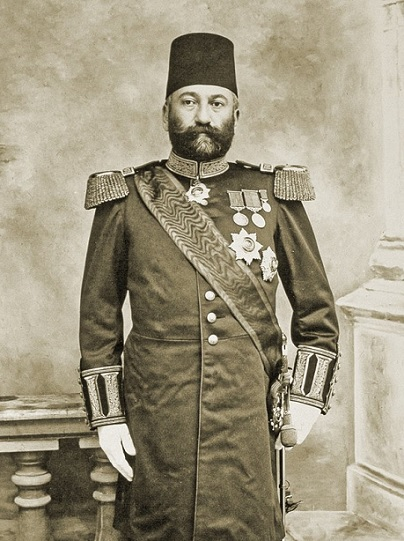

Grand Vizier of the Ottoman Empire
- In office 14 October 1919 – 2 March 1920
- Monarch: Mehmed VI
- Preceded by: Damat Ferid Pasha
- Succeeded by: Salih Hulusi Pasha

Minister of Interior
- In office June 1921 – June 1922
- Monarch: Mehmed VI
- Prime Minister: Ahmet Tevfik Pasha
- Preceded by: Mustafa Arif Bey
- Succeeded by: Salih Hulusi Pasha

Personal details
- Born: 1860 Constantinople, Ottoman Empire (now Istanbul, Turkey)
- Died: 1932 (aged 71–72) Istanbul, Turkey

Ali Rıza Pasha (1860–1932) was an Ottoman statesman and field marshal, who was one of the last Grand Viziers of the Ottoman Empire, under the reign of the last Ottoman Sultan Mehmed VI, between 14 October 1919 and 2 March 1920.

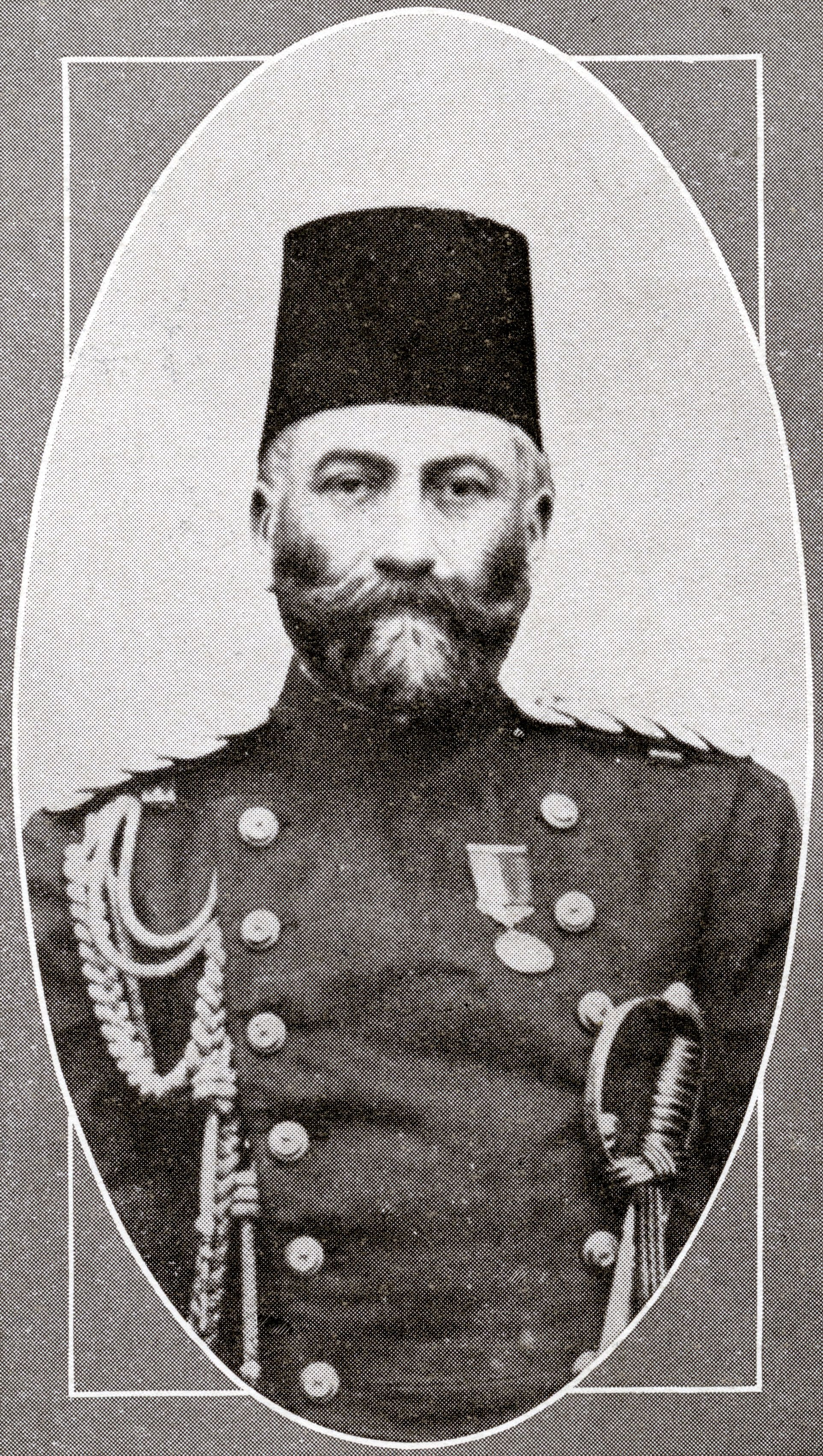
Ali Rıza Pasha, c. 1912

== Biography ==
He was born in 1860 in Istanbul, son of a gendarme major. He graduated from the Ottoman Military College in 1886. During the Greco-Turkish War of 1897, he served as the Director of the Military Operations Department. He held military and administrative posts such as the Governorship of Manastır in 1903, after which he was exiled to Libya upon the pressure exercised by Russia, for his alleged responsibility for the assassination of a Russian consul of the city. In 1905, he was appointed to Yemen where he suppressed an uprising. He joined the Freemasonry lodge Obedience of Véritas.

With the beginning of the Second Constitutional Era in the Ottoman Empire in 1908, he became War Minister in grand vizier Kıbrıslı Mehmed Kâmil Pasha's government but had to be removed due to objections raised by the Committee of Union and Progress. He was re-appointed to the same ministry in the Hüseyin Hilmi Pasha's cabinet in 1909 but resigned because of the 31 March Incident.

He served as Commander-in-Chief of the Western Army in the Balkan Wars, which erupted before he even had the time to assume his duties. Never favored by the CUP, his career plateaued during World War I. He was appointed as grand vizier on 2 October 1919, a post he held for five months, during the Occupation of Istanbul.

Recognizing the inevitability of an agreement with the National Forces organized in Anatolia, he established contact with the Representative Committee and sent Salih Pasha to Amasya to meet with Mustafa Kemal Pasha. He promised to take the Representative Committee's requests into consideration in the cabinet he would form. However, he began efforts to seize the National Forces' administrative power and abolish the Representative Committee. He was forced to resign before he could do so in 1920 under pressure from the Allied Powers. He served as Minister of Public Works and Minister of the Interior in the last Ottoman cabinet of 1922.

In terms of effective shaping of policies by the remaining Ottoman state structure, his office (as well as his successor Hulusi Salih Pasha's) are usually considered as mere intervals between the two offices of Damat Ferid Pasha, the signatory of the Treaty of Sèvres.

He died in Erenköy, Istanbul, on October 31, 1932, and is buried in İçerenköy Cemetery.

== See also ==
- List of Ottoman grand viziers
- Second Constitutional Era (Ottoman Empire)

Political offices
Preceded by Damat Ferid Pasha	Grand Vizier of the Ottoman Empire; 2 October 1919 – 8 March 1920	Succeeded by Hulusi Salih Pasha
