= Rıza Tevfik Bölükbaşı =

Turkish poet and philosopher, one of the signatories of armistice of Mondros (1869-1949)

Rıza Tevfik (Bölükbaşı) Bey
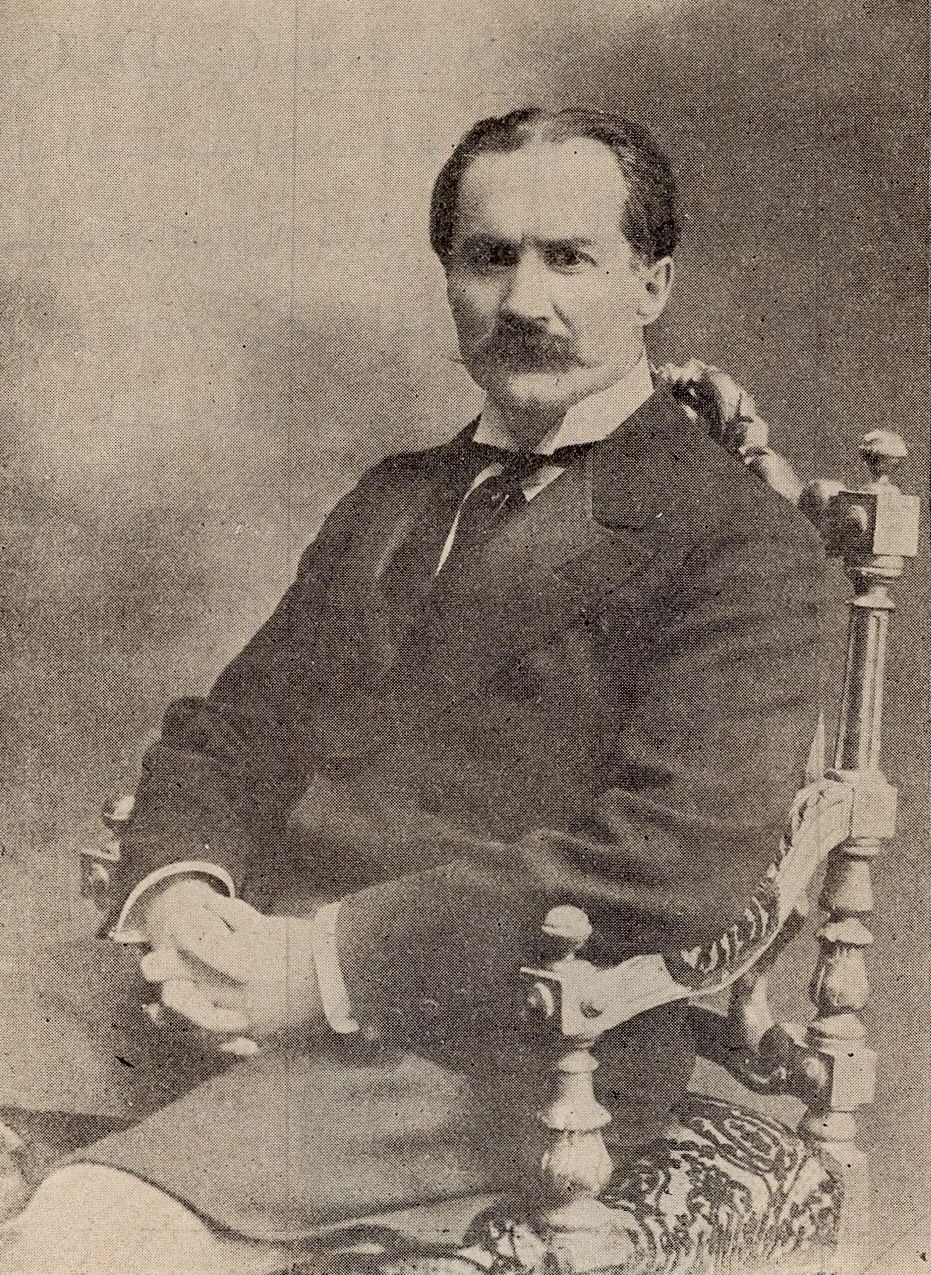
- Rıza Tevfik in 1910

Personal details
- Born: 1869 Mustafapaşa, Adrianople Vilayet, Ottoman Empire
- Died: 31 December 1949 (aged 80) Istanbul, Turkey
- Relations: Debre-i Ahmet Durmuş (Grandfather); Besim Tevfik (Brother)
- Parent: Hoca Mehmet Tevfik Efendi (Father)
- Occupation: Politician

Rıza Tevfik Bey (Rıza Tevfik Bölükbaşı after the Turkish Surname Law of 1934; 1869 – 31 December 1949) was an Ottoman and later Turkish philosopher, poet, politician of liberal signature and a community leader (for some members among the Bektashi community) of the late-19th-century and early-20th-century. A polyglot, he is most remembered in Turkey for being one of the four Ottoman signatories of Treaty of Sèvres, for which reason he was included in 1923 among the 150 personae non gratae of Turkey, and he spent 20 years in exile until he was given amnesty by Turkey in 1938, and returned in 1943. He is the author of the Gallipoli Diaries.

== Early life and career ==
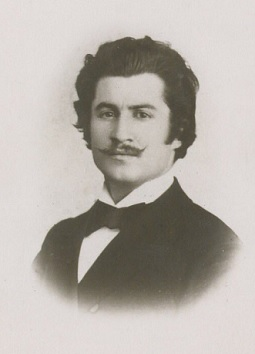
Rıza Tevfik in his early days

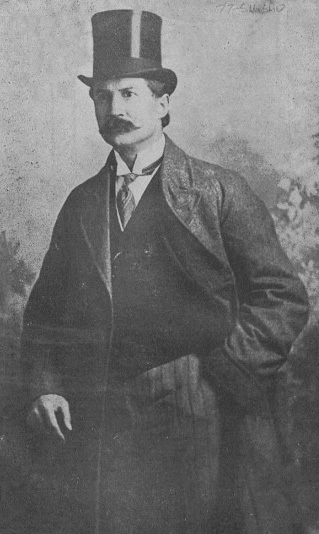
Rıza Tevfik departing to London in 1912

Rıza Tevfik was born in 1869 in Mustafapaşa, today Svilengrad in Bulgaria, to an Albanian father and Circassian mother, who died when he was young. He had a brother Besim, who would later commit suicide in Edirne. Placed in a Jewish school in Constantinople by his father, who was a prefect, Rıza Tevfik learned Spanish and French at an early age. He was remarked as a restless personality during his student years, first in the famed Galatasaray High School, and then in the Imperial School of Medicine (Tıbbiye), and he was arrested and incarcerated several times, not falling short of inciting fellow inmates to revolt during his prison months. He graduated in 1897 and became a doctor. In 1907, he joined the Committee of Union and Progress (CUP), and was one of that party's deputies for Edirne in the Chamber of Deputies (the popularly elected lower house of the re-established Ottoman Parliament) of 1908. He split with the CUP in 1911, joining for a short while the newly founded opposition Freedom and Accord Party (Liberal Entente), and was vehemently opposed to its entry of the Ottoman Empire into World War I.

== Political career in the Ottoman Empire ==
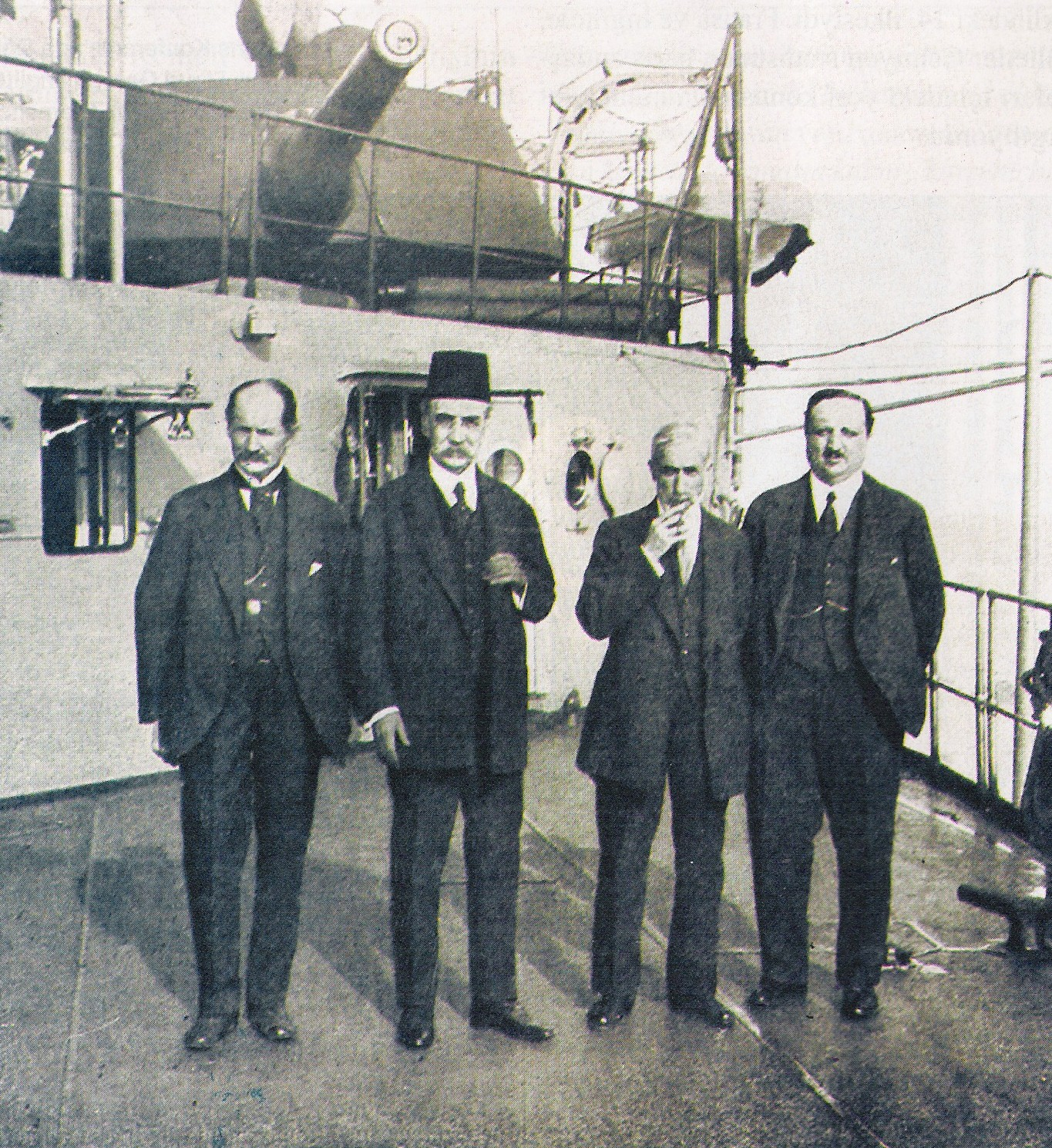
Rıza Tevfik (far left) with the three other representatives at the Treaty of Sèvres; the grand vizier Damat Ferid Pasha, minister of finance Mehmet Tevfik Biren, and the ambassador Reşat Halis; on board an Allied warship taking them to the Paris Peace Conference

Rıza Tevfik was named the Minister of Education of the Ottoman Empire (Turkish: Maarif Nazırı) in several cabinets (11 November 1918 – 12 January 1919) formed after the fall of the CUP and the Ottoman Empire's defeat in World War I. He was also appointed to the Senate (the upper house of the Ottoman Parliament) by the sultan, of which he became President twice (24 May – 18 June 1919 and 31 July – 21 October 1920).

He was one of the four signatories of the stillborn Treaty of Sèvres, being included in the delegation to the Paris Peace Conference by the grand vizier Damat Ferid Pasha, although he occupied no official position at the time of the negotiations, simply being a professor in Istanbul University. He wrote how "It is insolence to object to a state like England, which represents civilization", and that "European civilization will cleanse Anatolia of this harmful pest", referring to Turkish Nationalists.

Since he was one of the signatories of the abortive treaty, he was included in the 150 persona non grata of Turkey after the Turkish victory in the Turkish War of Independence, and he had to leave Turkey in late 1922.

== Exile, return to Turkey, and death ==
Rıza Tevfik lived in the United States, Cyprus, Hejaz, Jordan (where he was made the director of the National Museum and Library in 1925), and Lebanon during the following 20 years, until he could return to Turkey in the frame of a 1938 amnesty. He returned to Turkey in 1943. He adopted the last name Bölükbaşı after the 1934 Surname Law. In the meantime, he had had his collection of poetry published in Nicosia.

He resumed work as a university professor in Istanbul until his death on 31 December 1949. Aside from his poetry and his articles on philosophy, he is also notable for his translations into Turkish for most of the poems of Omar Khayyam.
