= Reshid Akif Pasha =

Ottoman statesman

Reşid Akif Paşa
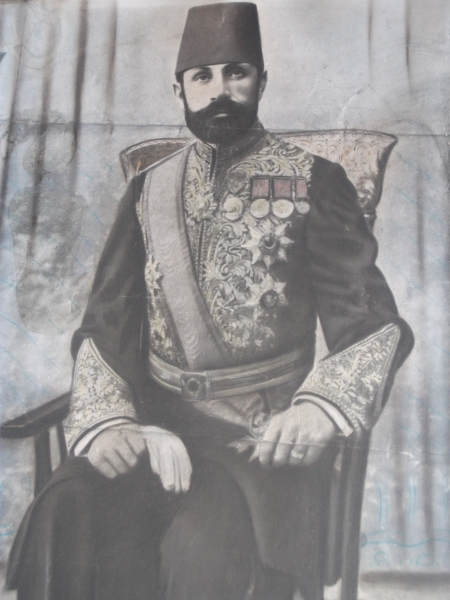
- Born: 1863; Ioannina, Ioannina Eyalet
- Died: 15 April 1920 (aged 56–57); Constantinople (now Istanbul), Ottoman Empire
- Occupation: Statesman
- Known for: Testimony about the Armenian genocide

Reshid Akif Pasha (Turkish: Reşit Akif Paşa, Albanian: Reshid Aqif Pasha; 1863 – 15 April 1920), was an Ottoman statesman of Albanian descent during the last decades of the Ottoman Empire. Throughout his career as a politician, Reshid Akif Paşa served as governor, minister of the interior, and in the Council of State. He is also noted for providing important testimony in the aftermath of the Armenian genocide.

== Life and career ==
Reshid Akif was born in Ioannina, today's Greece, in 1863 and was of Albanian ethnicity. He was the son of Mehmet Ali Pasha, an Ottoman statesman and governor. Akif then moved to Constantinople (now Istanbul) to study at Galatasaray High School. He became a politician and the governor of Sivas in 1901. He served as governor until 1908. He eventually moved to Istanbul where he was appointed as minister of the interior on 6 August 1909 for a few months, but resigned on health grounds; in the same year he became a member of the Senate of the Ottoman Empire.

After Talat Pasha's resignation in 1918, Reşid Akif was appointed to the Council of State under Ahmed Izzet Pasha's government. However, Izzet Pasha's cabinet was dissolved, and Akif Pasha again resigned a few weeks after appointment. He was then appointed to the new Council of Ministers in 1918 by the government of Damat Ferid Pasha.

== Armenian Genocide testimony ==
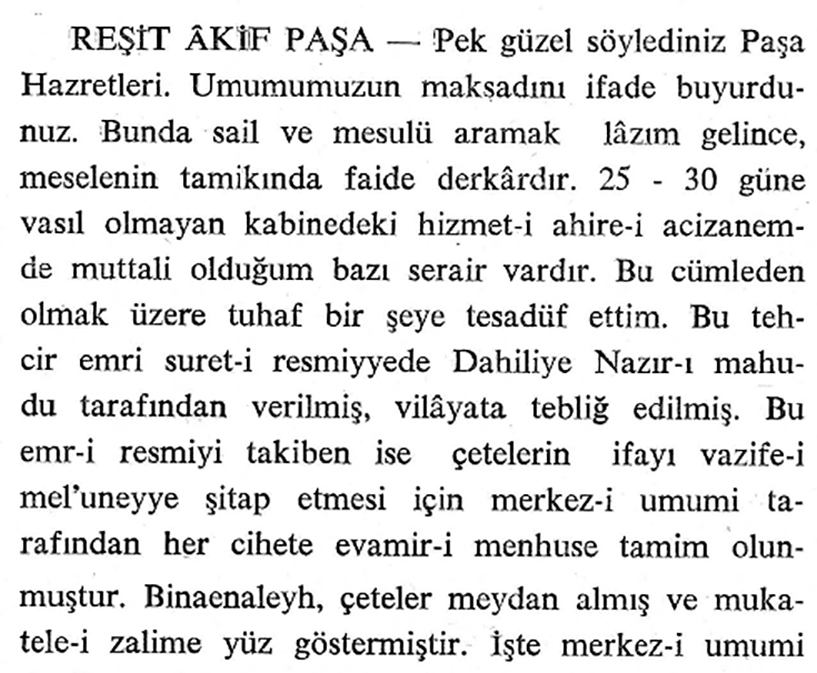
Reshid Akif Pasha's testimony published by the Grand National Assembly of Turkey in the Meclis-i Ayan Zabıt Ceridesi.

Reshid Akif Pasha is known for providing important testimony on the Armenian genocide during a session of the Ottoman parliament on 21 November 1918. Akif Pasha stated that during his short tenure as the president of the Council of State, he uncovered documents pertaining to the deportation of Armenians. The documents displayed the process in which official statements made use of vague terminology when ordering deportation only to be clarified by special orders ordering "massacres" sent directly from the Committee of Union and Progress headquarters or often the residence of Talat Pasha himself.

He testified as follows:

While humbly occupying my last post in the Cabinet, which barely lasted 25 to 30 days, I became cognizant of some secrets. I came across something strange in this respect. It was this official order for deportation, issued by the notorious Interior Ministry and relayed to the provinces. However, following [the issuance of] this official order, the Central Committee [of Union and Progress] undertook to send an ominous circular order to all points [in the provinces], urging the expediting of the execution of the accursed mission of the brigands. Thereupon, the brigands proceeded to act and the atrocious massacres were the result. (Note: Original Turkish: 25–30 güne vasıl olmayan (İzzet Paşa) kabine(sin)deki yakın dönemdeki hizmetinde öğrendiğim bazı gizli şeyler vardır. Bu cümleden olmak üzere tuhaf bir şeye tesadüf ettim. Bu tehcir emri resmi olarak mahut Dahiliye Nazırı (Talat) tarafından verilmiş, vilayetlere tebliğ edilmiş. Bu resmi emri takiben ise çetelerin koşup melun vazifelerini yerine getirmeleri için Merkez-i Umumi (İttihat Terakki yönetimi) tarafından uğursuz emirler her yöne tamim (emir) olunmuştur. Binaenaleyh, çeteler meydan almış ve mukatale-i zalime (zalim katliam) yüz göstermiştir.)

He continued by saying: "I am ashamed as a Muslim, I am ashamed as an Ottoman statesman. What a stain on the reputation of the Ottoman Empire, these criminal people ..."

The testimony was considered "extremely remarkable and noteworthy" by the contemporaneous local press. It was published by many newspapers in its entirety due to its "special importance". Historian Vahakn Dadrian has concluded that his statements are the "most incriminating evidence" for the systematic killings of the Armenian Genocide.

== Death and legacy ==
Reshid Akif Pasha died on 15 April 1920 in Constantinople. He is best remembered as an Ottoman politician who provided important testimony in the aftermath of the Armenian genocide. An elementary school in Zara, Turkey, is named after him.

== See also ==
- Witnesses and testimonies of the Armenian genocide
