= Treaty of Sèvres =

Unratified 1920 treaty signed between the Ottoman Empire and the Allies

The Treaty of Peace Between the Allied Powers and the Ottoman Empire Traité de paix entre les Puissances alliées et associées et la Turquie
- Signed: 10 August 1920
- Location: Manufacture nationale de Sèvres, Sèvres, France
- Condition: Ratification by the Ottoman Empire and the four principal Allied Powers
- Parties: Principal Allied Powers: British Empire; • United Kingdom; • Canada; • Australia; • New Zealand; • South Africa; • India; France; Italy; Japan; Allied Powers: Armenia; Belgium; Greece; Hejaz; Poland; Portugal; Romania; Kingdom of Serbs, Croats and Slovenes; Czechoslovakia; Central Power; Ottoman Empire
- Depositary: French Government
- Languages: French (primary), English, Italian

Full text
- Treaty of Sèvres at Wikisource

The Treaty of Sèvres (French: Traité de Sèvres) was a 1920 treaty signed between some of the Allies of World War I and the Ottoman Empire, but not ratified. The treaty would have required the cession of large parts of Ottoman territory to France, the United Kingdom, Greece, and Italy, as well as creating large occupation zones within the Ottoman Empire. It was one of a series of treaties that the Central Powers signed with the Allied Powers after their defeat in World War I. Hostilities had already ended with the Armistice of Mudros.

The treaty was signed on 10 August 1920 in an exhibition room at the Manufacture nationale de Sèvres porcelain factory in Sèvres, France.

The Treaty of Sèvres marked the beginning of the partitioning of the Ottoman Empire. The treaty's stipulations included the renunciation of most territory not inhabited by Turkish people and their cession to the Allied administration.

The ceding of Eastern Mediterranean lands saw the introduction of novel polities, including the British Mandate for Palestine and the French Mandate for Syria and Lebanon.

The terms stirred hostility and Turkish nationalism. The treaty's signatories were stripped of their citizenship by the Grand National Assembly, led by Mustafa Kemal Pasha, which ignited the Turkish War of Independence. Hostilities with Britain over the neutral zone of the Straits were narrowly avoided in the Chanak crisis of September 1922, when the Armistice of Mudanya was concluded on 11 October, leading the former Allies of World War I to return to the negotiating table with the Turks in November 1922. The 1923 Treaty of Lausanne, which superseded the Treaty of Sèvres, ended the conflict and saw the establishment of the Republic of Turkey.

== Negotiations ==
=== Ottoman Empire ===
The representatives of the Allied powers submitted the draft peace treaty they had prepared at the San Remo Conference (18–26 April 1920) and requested a response from the Ottoman government within a month. Former Grand Vizier Tevfik Pasha sent the draft agreement, which he found "incompatible with the concepts of independence and even statehood", to the government. The Ottoman government formed a commission to edit the proposal, and sent back their recommendations to the Allies powers on 25 June 1920. The Allied powers sternly rebuked Istanbul that they could expect to make any changes to the draft they previously prepared, other than a few minor, unimportant changes, and requested a response within ten days. Press in the capital was partial to the Sublime Porte with many concluding that there was no other choice but to accept the treaty.

Before making the final decision on the treaty, Sultan Mehmed VI convened another Sultanate Council on 22 July 1922 (the first one was called in May 1919 after the Greek landing at Smyrna), so that responsibility for treaty could be shifted to them. Government members, members of the Senate, former grand viziers, high-ranking officers, and leading figures of the ulema and bureaucracy were invited to the council. The number of delegates was 57 (down from 131 of the previous council), and did not include politicians affiliated with the Turkish National Movement. Care was taken not to invite representatives of the Defense of Rights movement and those with a Unionist political identity and background.

The council began deliberations by discussing a July 17 telegram from the Minister of the Interior Reşit Bey, who was in Paris, stating that the Allied Powers did not accept Ottoman reservations on the draft treaty. On July 20 the council announced that there was no other option but to approve the treaty. Grand Vizier Damat Ferid Pasha gave a speech, stating that the country had come to this point due to ten years of terrible mistakes instigated by the Committee of Union and Progress, but that Istanbul was still entrusted to the Turks because of the trust the Allies had in the Sultan, and that there was no other solution than accepting the treaty. Other statesmen like Mustafa Sabri Efendi and Hâdî Pasha gave speeches in support of the treaty. A vote was held in which all delegates supported the signature of the treaty, except for Topçu Feriki Rıza Pasha, who abstained.

== Summary ==
Signed between Allied and Associated Powers and Ottoman Empire at Sèvres
	Parts	Articles
I	The Covenant of the League of Nations	1-26
II	Frontiers of Turkey	27-35
III	Political Clauses	36-139
IV	Protection of Minorities	140-151
V	Military, Naval and Air Clauses	152-207
VI	Prisoners of War and Graves	208-225
VII	Penalties	226-230
VIII	Financial Clauses	231-260
IX	Economic Clauses	261-317
X	Aerial Navigation	318-327
XI	Ports, Waterways and Railways	328-373
XII	Labour (Part XIII of Versailles Treaty)	374-414
XIII	Miscellaneous Provisions	415-433

== Parties ==
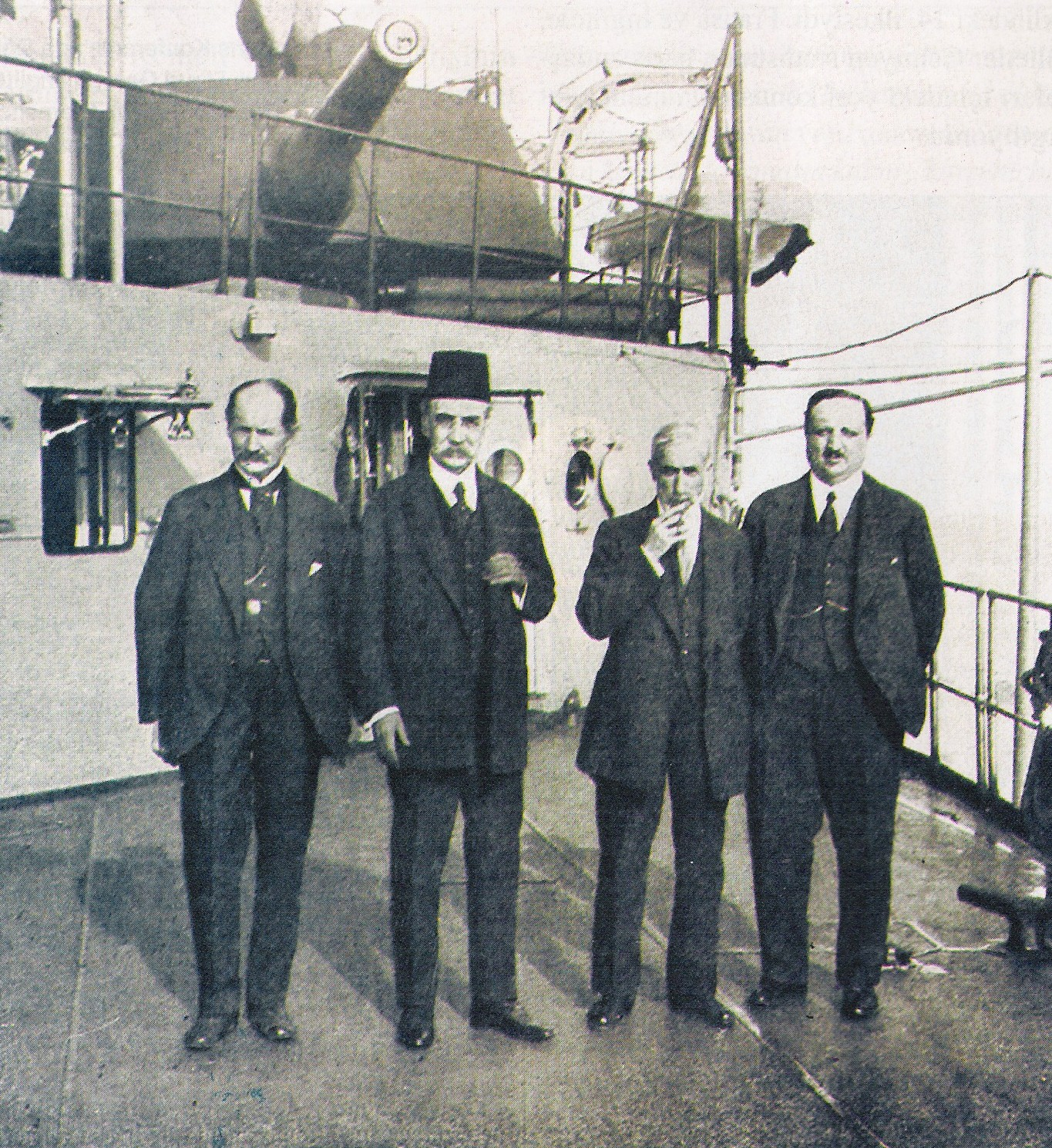
The Ottoman delegation at Sèvres: Left to right: Rıza Tevfik Bölükbaşı, Grand Vizier Damat Ferid Pasha (wearing fez), minister of finance Mehmet Tevfik Biren, and ambassador Reşat Halis

George Dixon Grahame signed for the United Kingdom, Alexandre Millerand for France, and Count Lelio Longare for Italy. One Allied power, Greece, did not accept the borders as drawn, mainly because of the political change after the 1920 Greek legislative election, and so never ratified the treaty.

There were three signatories for the Ottoman Empire:

1. Former Ottoman General Staff Hadi Pasha,
2. President of the Council of State Rıza Tevfik Bölükbaşı,
3. Second secretary of the Ottoman embassy in Bern, Reşat Halis.

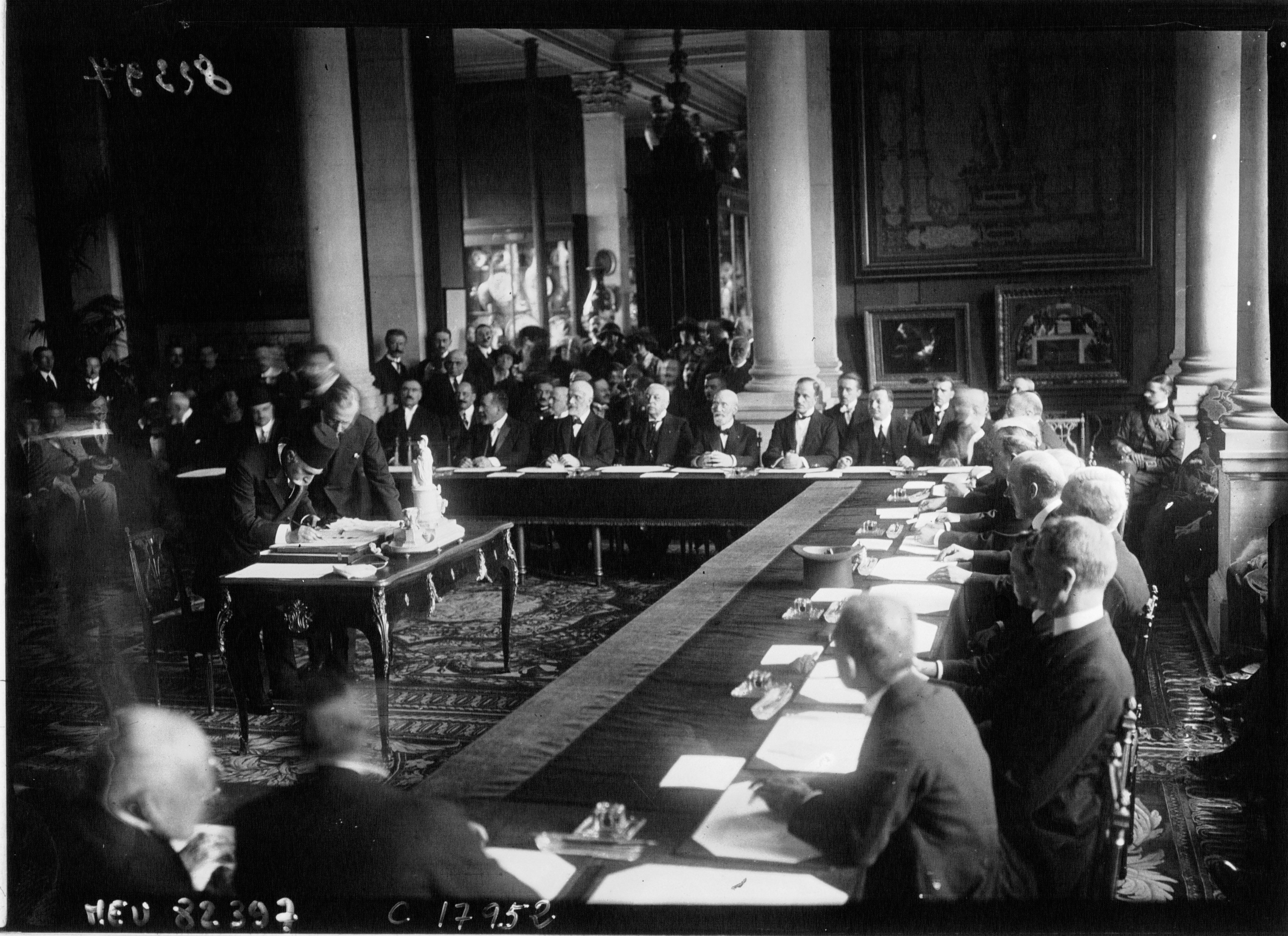
Mehmed Hâdî Pasha signs the Treaty of Sèvres

Grand Vizier Damat Ferid Pasha was present at the negotiations, but not a signatory to the treaty.

The Russian Soviet Federative Socialist Republic was not a party to the treaty because it had negotiated the Treaty of Brest-Litovsk with the Ottoman Empire in 1918.

The Treaty of Versailles was signed with the German Empire before the Treaty of Sèvres and annulled German concessions in the Ottoman sphere, including economic rights and enterprises.

Also, France, Britain, and Italy signed a Tripartite Agreement on the same date. It confirmed Britain's oil and commercial concessions and turned the former German enterprises in the Ottoman Empire over to a tripartite corporation.

The United States, having refused in the Senate to assume a League of Nations mandate over Armenia, decided not to participate in the partitioning of the Ottoman Empire. The US wanted a permanent peace as quickly as possible, with financial compensation for its military expenditure. However, after the Senate rejected the Armenian mandate, the only US hope was its inclusion in the treaty by the influential Greek Prime Minister Eleftherios Venizelos.

== Provisions ==
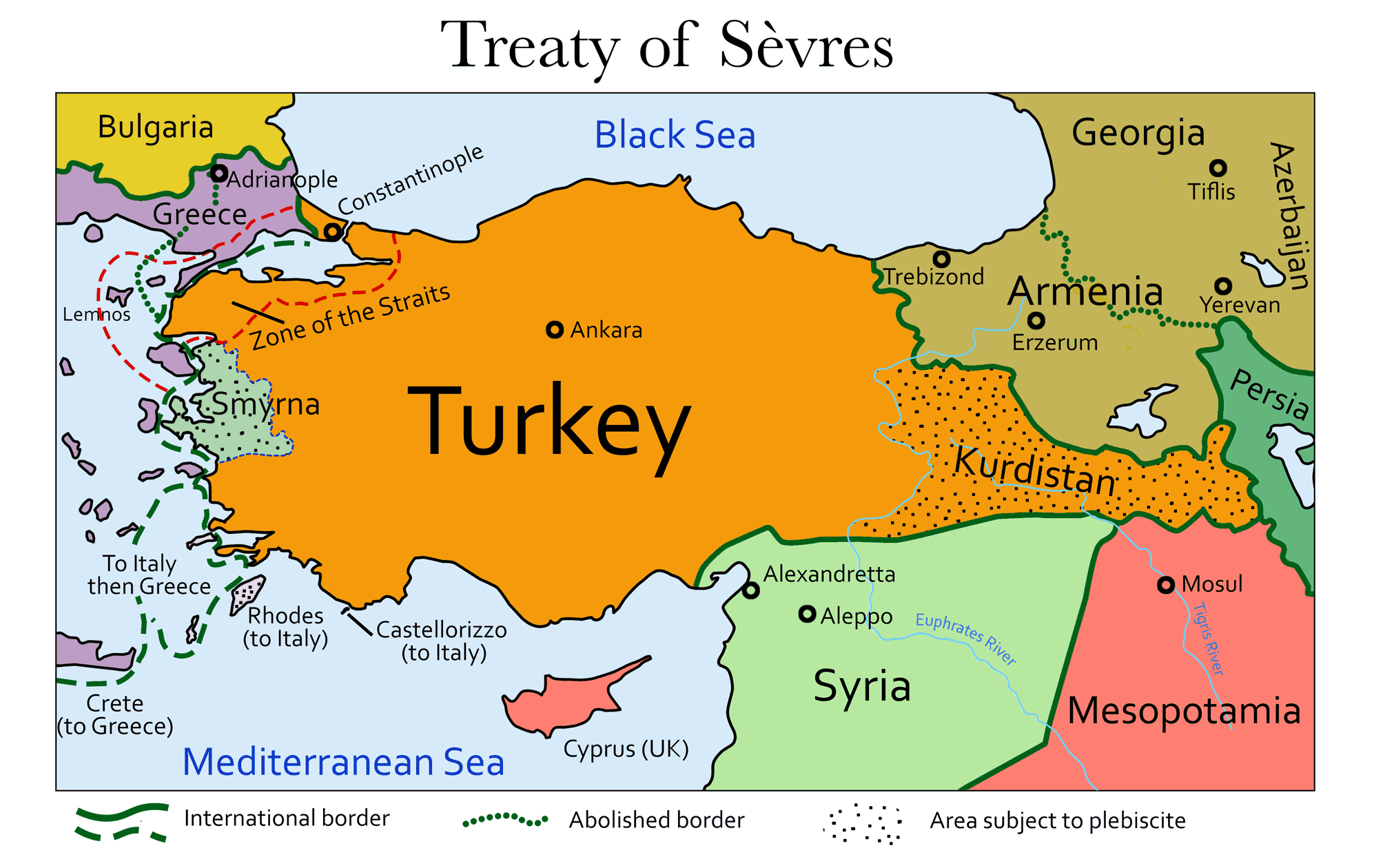
Partition of the Ottoman Empire according to the Treaty of Sèvres and the Greco-Italian Treaty

The treaty imposed a number of territorial losses on Turkey and had a number of provisions that applied to the territory recognised as belonging to Turkey.

=== Non-territorial ===
==== Financial restrictions ====
The Allies were to control the Ottoman Empire's finances, such as approving and supervising the national budget, implementing financial laws and regulations and totally controlling the Ottoman Bank. The Ottoman Public Debt Administration, instituted in 1881, was redesigned to include only British, French, and Italian bondholders. The Ottoman debt problem had dated back to the time of the Crimean War (1854–1856) during which the Ottoman Empire had borrowed money from abroad, mainly from France. Also the capitulations of the Ottoman Empire, which had been abolished in 1914 by Talaat Pasha, were restored.

The empire was required to grant freedom of transit to people, goods, vessels etc. passing through its territory, and goods in transit were to be free of all customs duties. Future changes to the tax system, the customs system, internal and external loans, import and export duties and concessions would need the consent of the financial commission of the Allied Powers to be implemented. To forestall the economic repenetration of Germany, Austria, Hungary or Bulgaria, the treaty demanded the empire to liquidate the property of citizens of those countries living within its territories. The public liquidation was to be organized by the Reparations Commission. Property rights of the Baghdad Railway were to pass from German control.

==== Military restrictions ====
The Ottoman Army was to be restricted to 50,700 men, and the Ottoman Navy could maintain only seven sloops and six torpedo boats. The Ottoman Empire was prohibited from creating an air force. The treaty included an interallied commission of control and organisation to supervise the execution of the military clauses.

==== International trials ====
The treaty required determination of those responsible for the Armenian genocide. Article 230 of the Treaty of Sèvres required the Ottoman Empire to "hand over to the Allied Powers the persons whose surrender may be required by the latter as being responsible for the massacres committed during the continuance of the state of war on territory which formed part of the Ottoman Empire on August 1, 1914". However, the inter-allied tribunal attempt to prosecute war criminals as demanded by the Treaty of Sèvres was eventually suspended, and the men who orchestrated the genocide escaped prosecution and traveled relatively freely throughout Europe and Central Asia.

==== Communal relations ====
The Ottoman Empire was to ensure equal rights between Muslims and non-Muslims, return deportees to their homes, and restore property which was previously confiscated. All conversions to Islam since 1 November 1914 were to be annulled.

=== Foreign zones of influence ===
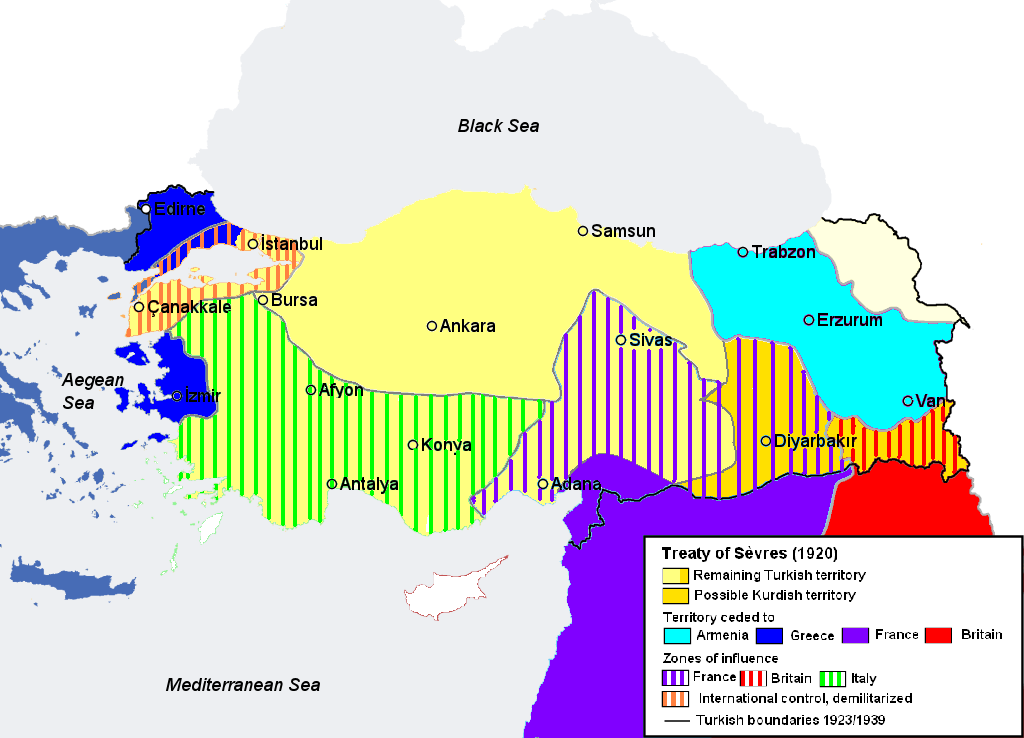
Treaty of Sèvres with zones of influence

==== France ====
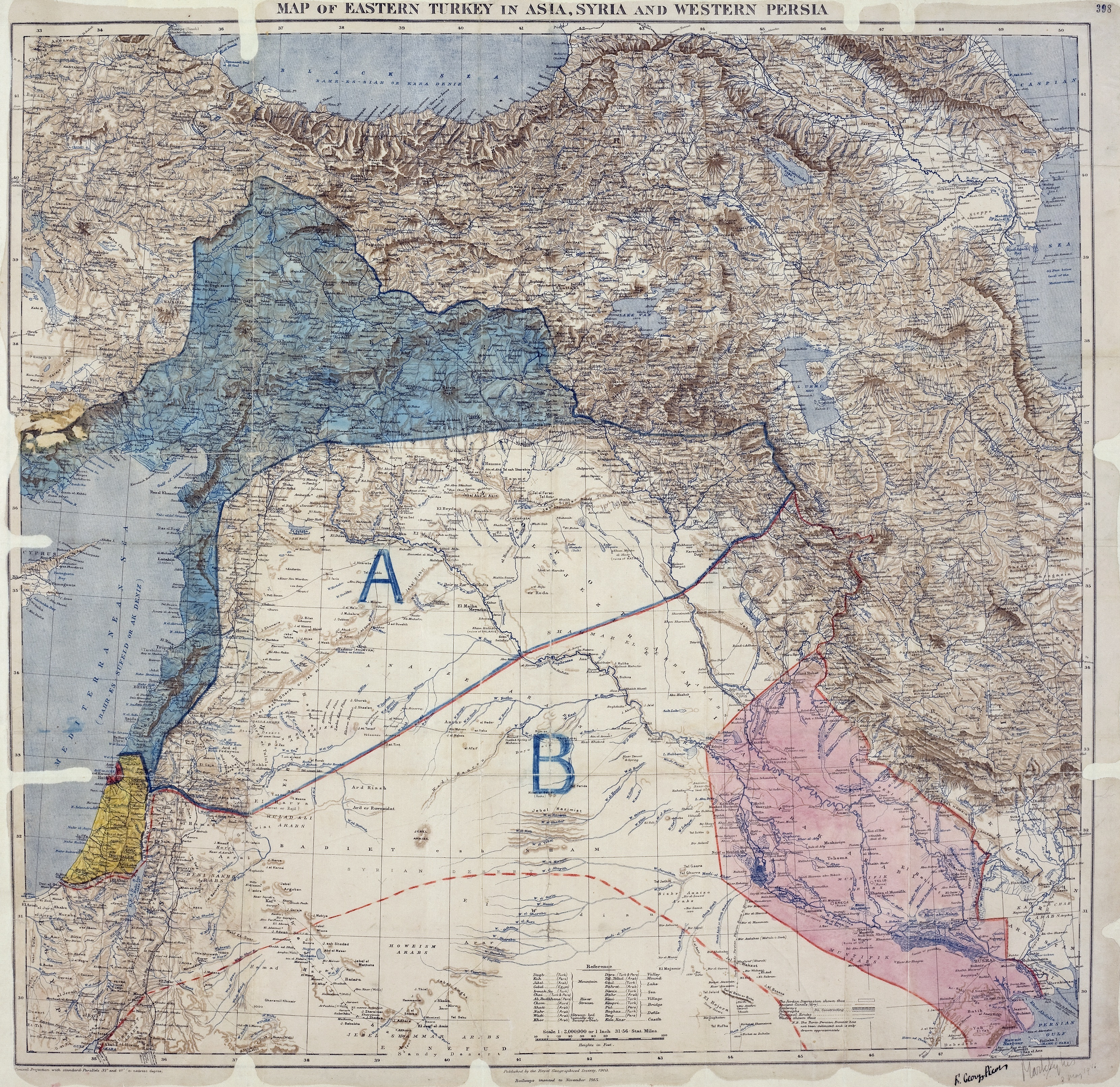
Sykes–Picot Agreement. After Franco-Turkish War, border redesigned with Treaty of Ankara

Within the territory retained by Turkey under the treaty, France received Syria and neighbouring parts of southeastern Anatolia, including Antep, Urfa, and Mardin. Cilicia, including Adana, Diyarbakır and large portions of east-central Anatolia all the way north to Sivas and Tokat, were declared a zone of French influence on Sykes–Picot Agreement.

==== Greece ====
The expansion of Greece from 1832 to 1947 showing in yellow territories awarded to Greece by the Treaty of Sèvres but lost in 1923

The Greek government administered the occupation of Smyrna from 21 May 1919. A protectorate was established on 30 July 1922. The treaty transferred "the exercise of her rights of sovereignty to a local parliament" but left the region within the Ottoman Empire. The treaty had Smyrna to be administered by a local parliament, with a plebiscite overseen by the League of Nations after five years to decide if Smyrna's citizens wished to join Greece or to remain in the Ottoman Empire. The treaty accepted Greek administration of the Smyrna enclave, but the area remained under Turkish sovereignty. To protect the Christian population from attacks by the Turkish irregulars, the Greek army expanded its jurisdiction also to nearby cities creating the so-called "Smyrna Zone".

==== Italy ====
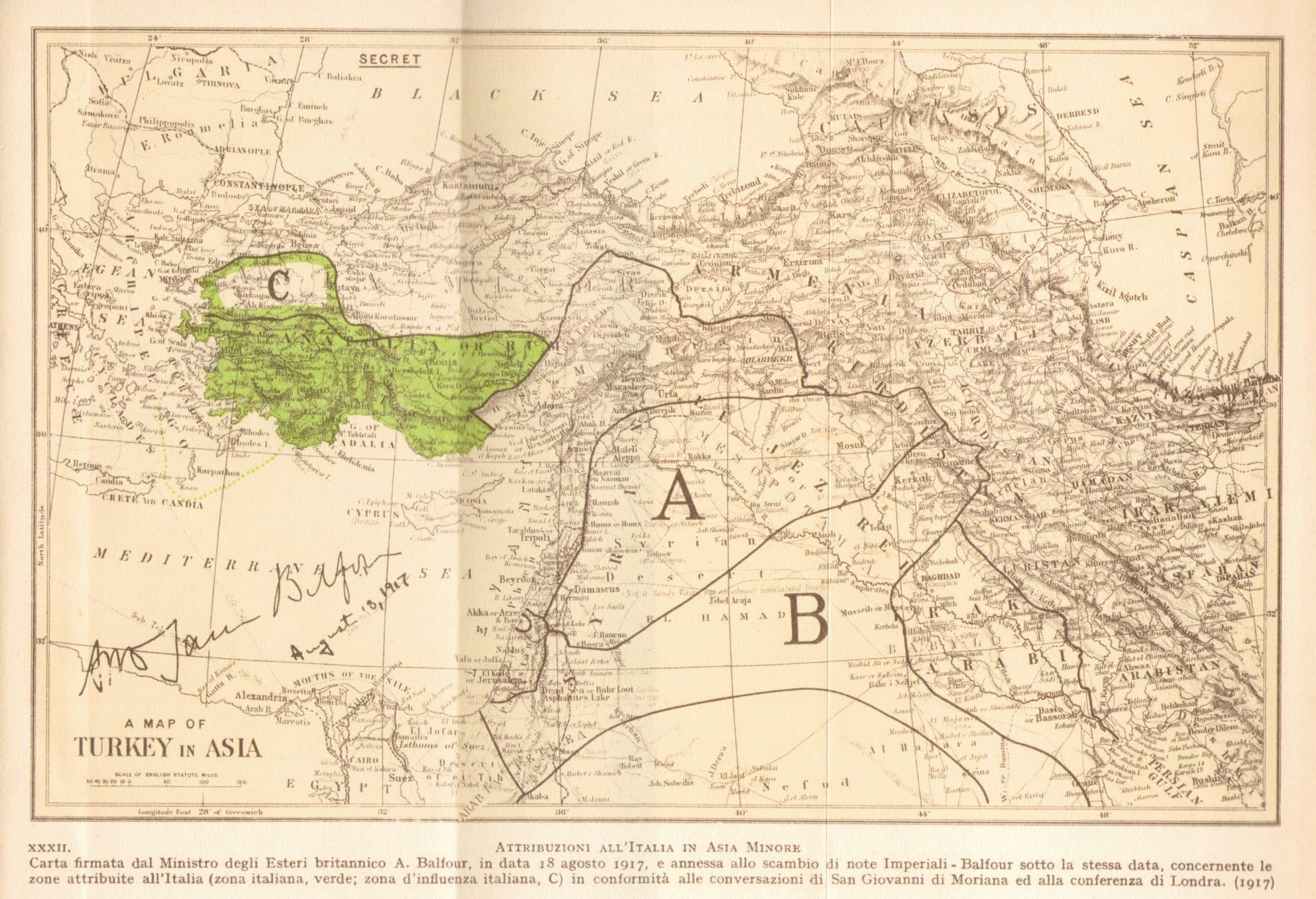
Map of the Agreement of Saint-Jean-de-Maurienne, signed in August 1917. The dotted green line in the Aegean Sea notes the Italian Islands of the Aegean, already under Italian control.

Italy was formally given possession of the Dodecanese Islands, which had been under Italian occupation since the Italo-Turkish War of 1911–1912 despite the Treaty of Ouchy according to which Italy should have returned the islands to the Ottoman Empire. Large portions of southern and west-central Anatolia, including the port city of Antalya and the historic Seljuk capital of Konya, were declared to be an Italian zone of influence on Agreement of Saint-Jean-de-Maurienne. Antalya Province had been promised by the Triple Entente to Italy in the Treaty of London, and the Italian colonial authorities wished the zone to become an Italian colony under the name of Lycia.

=== Territorial provisions ===
Date	States Square miles (km²)						
1914	Ottoman Empire 1,589,540 km^{2} (613,724 sq mi)						
1918 (Sèvres Treaty)	Ottoman Empire; 453,000 km^{2} (174,900 sq mi)	Wilsonian Armenia; 160,000 km^{2} (60,000 sq mi)	Syria; 350,000 km^{2} (136,000 sq mi)	Independent Kurdish State; 370,000 km^{2} (143,000 sq mi)	Hejaz; 260,000 km^{2} (100,000 sq mi)	Asir; 91,000 km^{2} (35,000 sq mi)	Yemen; 190,000 km^{2} (75,000 sq mi)

==== Zone of the Straits ====
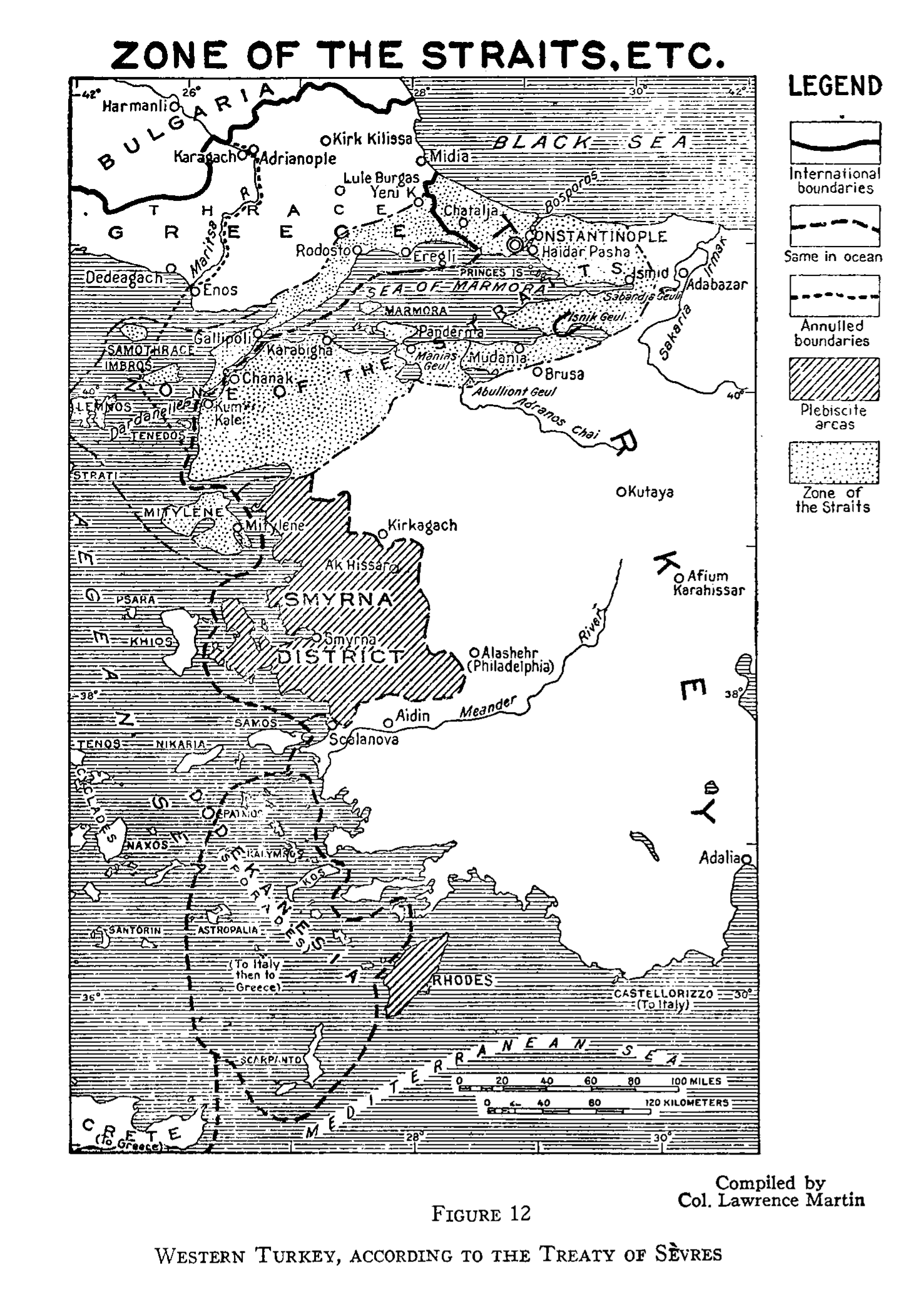
1920 map of Western Turkey, showing the Zone of the Straits in the Treaty of Sèvres

A Zone of the Straits was proposed to include the Bosporus, the Dardanelles, and the Sea of Marmara. Navigation would be open in the Dardanelles in times of peace and war alike to all vessels of commerce and war, regardless of flag. That would effectively lead to the internationalisation of the waters, which were not to be subject to blockade, and no act of war could be committed there except to enforce decisions of the League of Nations.

==== Free zones ====
Certain ports were to be declared to be of international importance. The League of Nations insisted on the complete freedom and the absolute equality in treatment at such ports, particularly regarding charges and facilities, to ensure that economic provisions in commercially-strategic places were carried out. The regions were to be called "free zones". The ports were Constantinople from San Stefano to Dolmabahçe, Haidar-Pasha, Smyrna, Alexandretta, Haifa, Basra, Trabzon, and Batum.

==== Thrace ====
Eastern Thrace (up to the Chatalja line), the islands of Imbros and Tenedos and the islands of the Sea of Marmara were ceded to Greece. The waters surrounding the islands were declared international territory and left to the administration of the "Zone of the Straits".

==== Kurdistan ====
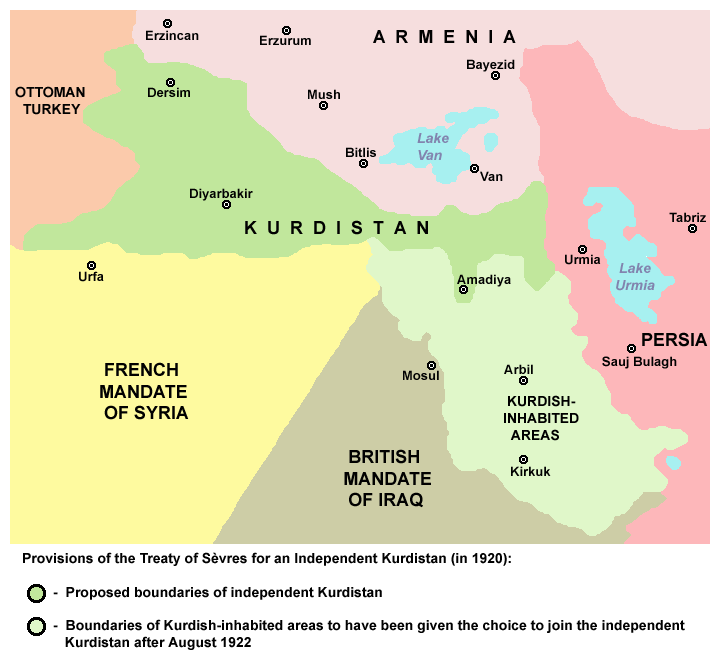
Provisions of the Treaty of Sèvres for an independent Kurdistan (in 1920)

The Kurdistan region, including Mosul Province, was scheduled to have a referendum to decide its fate.

There was no general agreement among Kurds on what the borders of Kurdistan should be because of the disparity between the areas of Kurdish settlement and the political and administrative boundaries of the region. The outlines of Kurdistan as an entity had been proposed in 1919 by Şerif Pasha, who represented the Society for the Elevation of Kurdistan (Kürdistan Teali Cemiyeti) at the Paris Peace Conference. He defined the region's boundaries as follows:

The frontiers of Turkish Kurdistan, from an ethnographical point of view, begin in the north at Ziven, on the Caucasian frontier, and continue westwards to Erzurum, Erzincan, Kemah, Arapgir, Besni and Divick (Divrik?); in the south they follow the line from Harran, Sinjar Mountains, Tel Asfar, Erbil, Süleymaniye, Akk-el-man, Sinne; in the east, Ravandiz, Başkale, Vezirkale, that is to say the frontier of Persia as far as Mount Ararat.

That caused controversy among other Kurdish nationalists, as it excluded the Van Region (possibly as a sop to Armenian claims to that region). Emin Ali Bedir Khan proposed an alternative map that included Van and an outlet to the sea via what is now Turkey's Hatay Province. Amid a joint declaration by Kurdish and Armenian delegations, Kurdish claims concerning Erzurum vilayet and Sassoun (Sason) were dropped, but arguments for sovereignty over Ağrı and Muş remained.

Neither proposal was endorsed by the treaty of Sèvres, which outlined a truncated Kurdistan on what is now Turkish territory (leaving out the Kurds of Iran, British-controlled Iraq and French-controlled Syria). The current Iraqi–Turkish border was agreed upon in July 1926.

Article 63 explicitly granted the full safeguard and protection to the Assyro-Chaldean minority, but that provision was dropped in the Treaty of Lausanne.

==== Armenia ====
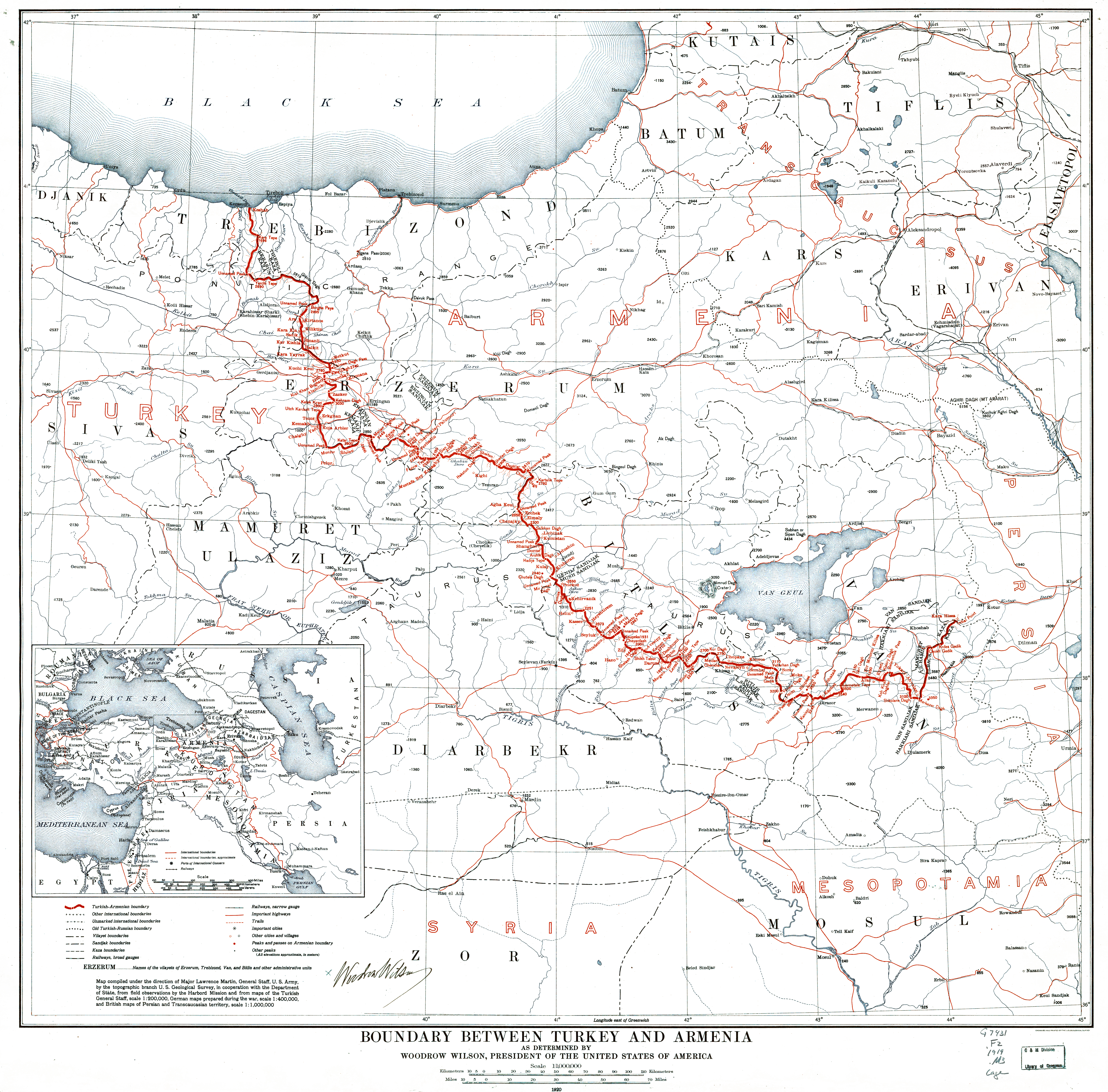
The First Republic of Armenia, with the western borders defined by US President Woodrow Wilson

Armenia was recognised as a "free and independent" state in Section VI "Armenia", Articles 88-93. By Article 89, "Turkey and Armenia, as well as the other High Contracting Parties agree to submit to the arbitration of the President of the United States of America the question of the frontier to be fixed between Turkey and Armenia in the vilayets of Erzerum, Trebizond, Van and Bitlis, and to accept his decision thereupon, as well as any stipulations he may prescribe as to access for Armenia to the sea, and as to the demilitarisation of any portion of Turkish territory adjacent to the said frontier".

The treaty specified that the frontiers between Armenia and Azerbaijan and Georgia were to be determined by direct negotiation between those states, with the Principle Allied Powers making the decision if those states fail to agree.

==== British Mandate for Iraq ====
The details in the treaty regarding the British Mandate for Iraq were completed on 25 April 1920 at the San Remo Conference. The oil concession in the region was given to the British-controlled Turkish Petroleum Company (TPC), which had held concessionary rights to Mosul Province. British and Iraqi negotiators held acrimonious discussions over the new oil concession. The League of Nations voted on the disposition of Mosul, and the Iraqis feared that without British support, Iraq would lose the area. In March 1925, the TPC was renamed the "Iraq Petroleum Company" (IPC) and granted a full and complete concession for 75 years.

==== British Mandate for Palestine ====
The three principles of the British Balfour Declaration regarding Palestine were adopted in the Treaty of Sèvres:

Article 95: The High Contracting Parties agree to entrust, by application of the provisions of Article 22, the administration of Palestine, within such boundaries as may be determined by the Principal Allied Powers, to a Mandatory to be selected by the said Powers. The Mandatory will be responsible for putting into effect the declaration originally made on 2 November 1917 by the British Government, and adopted by the other Allied Powers, in favour of the establishment in Palestine of a national home for the Jewish people, it being clearly understood that nothing shall be done which may prejudice the civil and religious rights of existing non-Jewish communities in Palestine, or the rights and political status enjoyed by Jews in any other country.

==== French Mandate for Syria and Lebanon ====
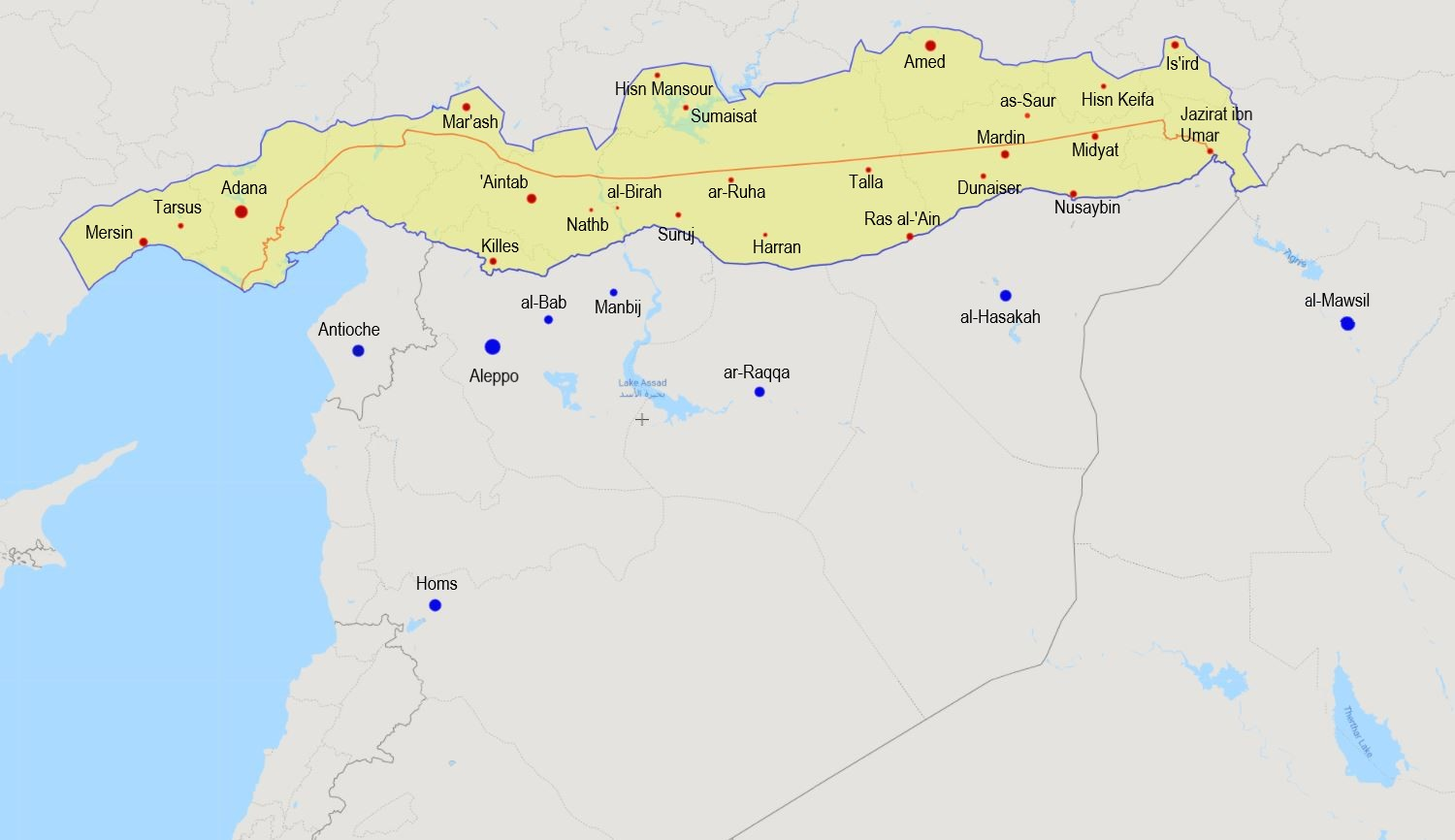
Syrian Northern Sanjaks ceded to Turkey by France in the Treaty of Ankara 1921 (area shaded in yellow). The orange line shows the Treaty of Sèvres border

The French Mandate was settled at the San Remo Conference: it comprised the region between the basin of the Euphrates River and the Syrian Desert on the east and the Mediterranean Sea on the west, and extended from the Nur Mountains in the north to Egypt in the south. This represented an area of about 60,000 sq mi (160,000 km^{2}) with a population of about 3,000,000, including Lebanon and an enlarged Syria, both of which were later reassigned under a League of Nations Mandate. The region was divided under the French into five governments as follows: Aleppo, from the Euphrates region to the Mediterranean, which included the autonomous Sanjak of Alexandretta (modern-day Hatay); Damascus, including Damascus, Hama, Homs and the Hauran; Greater Lebanon, extending from Tripoli to Palestine; the Alawite State, comprising the coast between the Sanjak of Alexandretta and Greater Lebanon, and the Jabal Druze State, around the city of As-Suwayda. Faisal ibn Husayn, who had been proclaimed king of Syria by a Syrian National Congress in Damascus in March 1920, was ejected by the French in July the same year. The next year, he became king of Iraq.

==== Kingdom of Hejaz ====
The Kingdom of Hejaz, on the Arabian Peninsula, was granted international recognition and had an estimated area of 100,000 sq mi (260,000 km^{2}) and a population of about 750,000. The main cities were the Holy Places of Mecca, with a population of 80,000, and Medina, with a population of 40,000. Under the Ottomans, it had been the vilayet of Hejaz, but during the war, it became an independent kingdom under British influence.

== Abandonment ==
The Treaty of Sèvres imposed terms on the Ottoman Empire that were far more severe than those imposed on the German Empire by the Treaty of Versailles. France, Italy and Britain had secretly begun planning the partitioning of the Ottoman Empire as early as 1915. The open negotiations covered a period of more than 15 months, started at the Paris Peace Conference of 1919, continued at the Conference of London of February 1920 and took definite shape only after the San Remo Conference in April 1920. The delay occurred because the powers could not come to an agreement, which, in turn, hinged on the outcome of the Turkish National Movement. The Treaty of Sèvres was never ratified, and after the Turkish War of Independence, most of the Treaty of Sèvres's signatories signed and ratified the Treaty of Lausanne in 1923 and 1924.

While the Treaty of Sèvres was still under discussion, the Turkish national movement under Mustafa Kemal Pasha split with the monarchy, based in Istanbul, and set up a Turkish Grand National Assembly in Ankara in April 1920. The so-called Ankara government closely monitored the preparation of the draft treaty and its acceptance by the Istanbul government. On June 7, 1920, the Grand National Assembly passed a law declaring all treaties signed by the Istanbul Government since 16 March 1920 (the formal occupation of Istanbul) invalid.

On 18 October, the government of Damat Ferid Pasha was replaced by a provisional one under Ahmed Tevfik Pasha as Grand Vizier, who announced an intention to convene the Senate to ratify the Treaty of Sèvres if national unity was achieved. That required seeking the co-operation of Mustafa Kemal, who expressed disdain for the treaty and started a military assault. As a result, the Turkish government issued a note to the Entente that the ratification of the treaty was impossible at the time.

Eventually, Mustafa Kemal succeeded in the Turkish War of Independence and forced most of the former wartime Allies to return to the negotiating table at Lausanne.

Aside from Mustafa Kemal's armed opposition to the treaty in Anatolia, Arabs in Syria were unwilling to accept French rule, the Turks around Mosul attacked the British, and Arabs were up in arms against British rule in Baghdad. There was also disorder in Egypt.

== Subsequent treaties ==
During the Turkish War of Independence, the Turkish Army successfully fought Greek, Armenian, and French forces and secured the independence of a territory similar to that of present-day Turkey, as was aimed at by the National Pact.

The Turkish national movement developed its own international relations with the Treaty of Moscow with Soviet Russia on 16 March 1921, the Accord of Ankara with France putting an end to the Franco-Turkish War, the Treaty of Alexandropol with the Armenians and the Treaty of Kars to fix the eastern borders.

Hostilities with Britain over the neutral zone of the Straits were narrowly avoided in the Chanak crisis of September 1922, when the Armistice of Mudanya was concluded on 11 October, leading the former Allies of World War I to return to the negotiating table with the Turks in November 1922. That culminated in 1923 in the Treaty of Lausanne, which replaced the Treaty of Sèvres and restored a large territory in Anatolia and Thrace to the Turks. Under the Treaty of Lausanne, France and Italy lost their zones of influence to areas of facilitated economic interaction, the Northern Syrian regions were separated from Ottoman Syria, Constantinople was not made an international city, and a demilitarised zone between Turkey and Bulgaria was established.

== See also ==
- Sèvres syndrome
- Paris Peace Conference
- Minority Treaties
- Sykes–Picot Agreement
- Agreement of Saint-Jean-de-Maurienne
