= Reşat Halis =

Ottoman Turkish politician

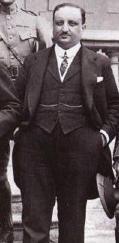
Reşat Halis, 1920

Reşat Halis (1883 – 1945) was an Ottoman liberal politician, diplomat, and minister in the cabinet of Damat Ferid Pasha. Being one of the signatories of the Treaty of Sèvres, he was declared personae non gratae by Turkey and exiled for his collaboration with Allied forces during the Allied occupation of Constantinople.
