= Mehmet Tevfik Biren =

Ottoman Turkish politician

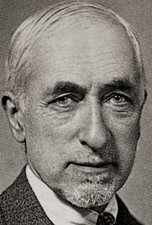
Mehmet Tevfik bey

Mehmet Tevfik Biren (1867 – 1956) was an Ottoman government official and liberal politician of the short-lived Ottoman Liberty Party. He was in favor of signing the Treaty of Sèvres. He was the son of an Ottoman bureaucrat and grew up in Istanbul. He studied civil administration until 1885 and following became the Mutsarrif of Jerusalem between 1897 until 1901. As he left Jerusalem, he became a Vali to several provinces of the Ottoman Empire, at the end becoming a Minister of Finance during the last Ottoman Government. Following the end of the First World War he was arrested by the Allied Forces and sent to Malta as one of the Malta Exiles.
