= Damat Ferid Pasha =

Grand Vizier of the Ottoman Empire (1853–1923)

Damat Mehmed Adil Ferid Pasha
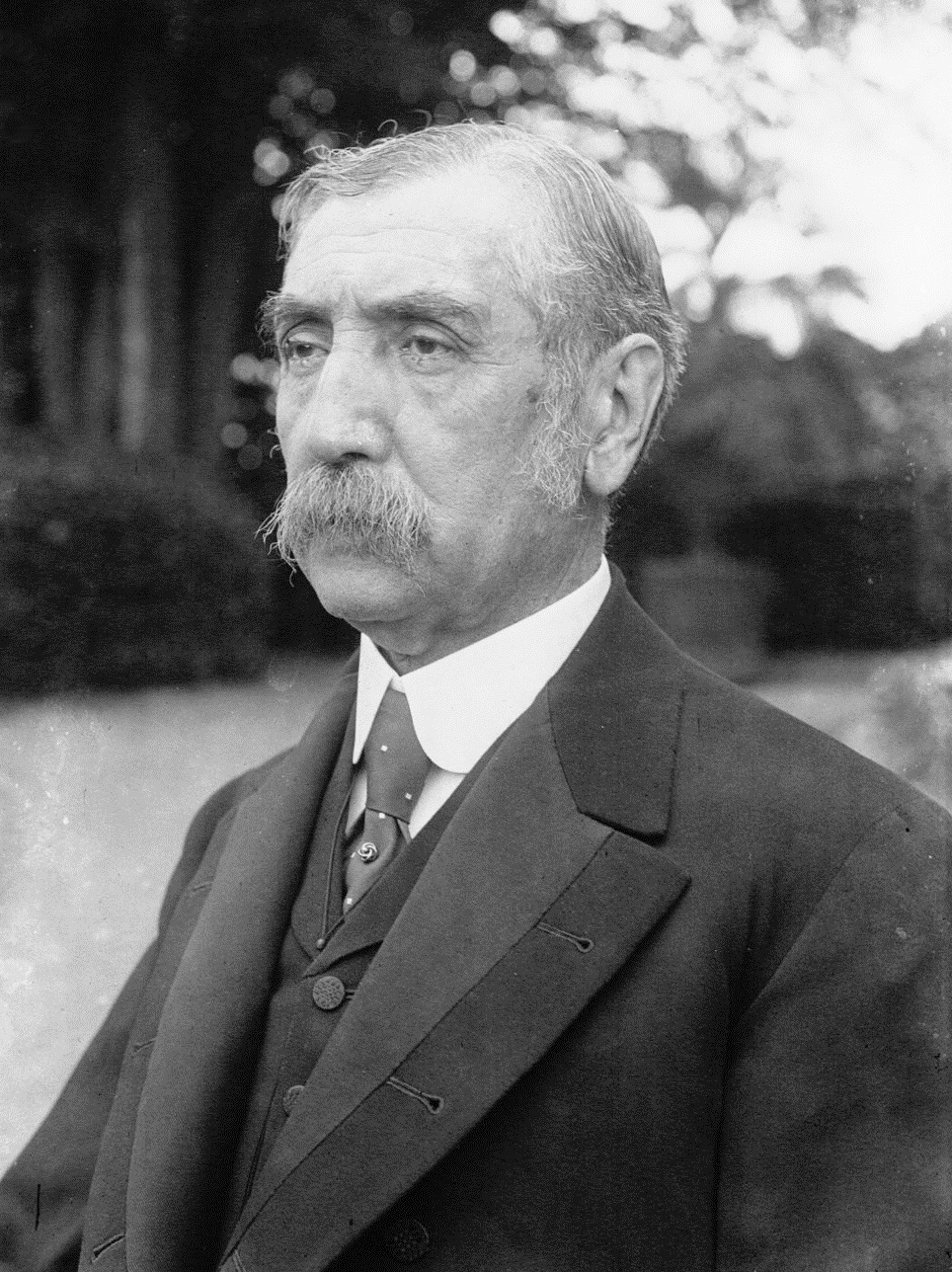
- 1919 photograph

Grand Vizier of the Ottoman Empire
- In office 4 March 1919 – 2 October 1919
- Monarch: Mehmed VI
- Preceded by: Ahmet Tevfik Pasha
- Succeeded by: Ali Rıza Pasha
- In office 5 April 1920 – 21 October 1920
- Monarch: Mehmed VI
- Preceded by: Salih Hulusi Pasha
- Succeeded by: Ahmet Tevfik Pasha

Personal details
- Born: 1853 Istanbul, Ottoman Empire
- Died: 6 October 1923 (aged 69–70) Nice, France
- Party: Freedom and Accord Party
- Spouse: Mediha Sultan

"Damat" Mehmed Adil Ferid Pasha (Ottoman Turkish: محمد عادل فريد پاشا Turkish: Damat Ferit Paşa; 1853 – 6 October 1923), known simply as Damat Ferid Pasha, was an Ottoman liberal statesman, who held the office of Grand Vizier, the de facto prime minister of the Ottoman Empire, during two periods under the reign of the last Ottoman Sultan Mehmed VI, the first time between 4 March 1919 and 2 October 1919 and the second time between 5 April 1920 and 21 October 1920. He was the Sultan's imperial brother-in-law (damat) through his marriage to his sister, Mediha Sultan. Officially, he was brought to the office a total of five times, since his cabinets were recurrently dismissed under various pressures and he had to present new ones. Because of his involvement in the Treaty of Sèvres, his collaboration with the occupying Allied powers, and his readiness to acknowledge atrocities against the Armenians, he was declared a traitor and subsequently a persona non grata in Turkey. He emigrated to Europe at the end of the Turkish War of Independence.

== Early life and career ==
Some claim that Mehmed Adil Ferid was born in 1853 in Constantinople as the son of Hasan İzzet Efendi, who was born in Potoci near Taşlıca (now Pljevlja, Montenegro). He was a member of the Council of State and Governor of Beirut and Sidon in 1857.

In 1879, Ferid was enrolled at the Schools of Islamic Charities in Sidon. He served several positions in Ottoman administration before he entered the foreign office of the Ottoman Empire and was assigned to different posts at embassies in Paris, Berlin, St. Petersburg, and London. He was one of the first to advocate rendering Turkish in the Latin alphabet instead of the Perso-Arabic alphabet.

He married a daughter of Abdülmecid I, Mediha Sultana, which earned him the title of "damat" ("bridegroom" to the Ottoman dynasty). After her husband Ahmed Necib Pasha's passing, it was determined that Ferid was the most eligible bachelor for the princess. His full brother-in-law was Şehzade Mehmed Vahdeddin, future Mehmed VI. His political career was essentially launched by this marriage. Like his father, he became a member of the Council of State and earned the title of vizier and pasha soon after the wedding in 1884. Through the ups and downs of Ferid's career, Mediha stood by her husband and used her influence to keep him from falling from grace. Ferid was likewise devoted to her, though Mediha never took down the photograph of her past husband from her room in the Baltalimanı palace.

Ferid's relationship with his brother-in-law was extremely poor. Mediha complained to Vahdeddin that Ferid had been showing too much interest in one of their servant girls. Ferid happened upon the two on a walk and the Şehzade hit him in the face with a horse whip.

Ferid served in the London embassy as a clerk, but his dream was to become the ambassador. Mediha lobbied her half-brother Abdul Hamid II appoint him there, but the sultan angrily refused. Spurned, Ferid stopped attending ceremonies at Yıldız, and retired into a private life in the Baltalimanı palace.

== Second Constitutional Era ==
After the 1908 revolution, he returned to public service as a member of the Senate of the Ottoman Parliament. Like many politicians of the time, he was initially a strong supporter of the Committee of Union and Progress. However the CUP did not show interest in him, so he withdrew his support. He was one of the founding members of the Freedom and Accord Party in 1911, favoring liberalism and more regional autonomy within the Empire, in opposition to the CUP. He served as its first president from 24 November 1911 to 3 June 1912.

During this time he obtained the reputation of a careerist charlatan. It was suggested that Damat Ferit Pasha be sent to the London conference to end the First Balkan War, but Grand Vizier Kâmil Pasha objected, saying "this man is crazy." He also hoped to be sent to Mudros to sign the armistice with the British to end the First World War, but Grand Vizier İzzet Pasha also kept him out for similar sentiments.

On 11 June 1919, he officially admitted the Ottoman states' complicity to massacres against Armenians and was a key figure and initiator of the Istanbul trials held directly after World War I to condemn to death the chief perpetrators of the genocide, who were notably CUP members and long-time rivals of his own Freedom and Accord Party. Later on, at the Paris Peace Conference, he denied that non-Muslims were specifically massacred during World War I, saying that three million Muslims had also died. He did not rejoin his political party after it was reestablished in the aftermath of World War I.

== Grand Vezierates ==
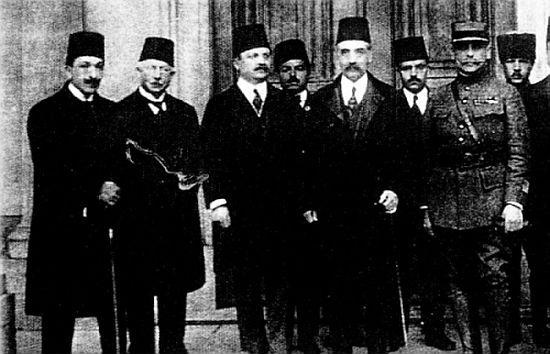
First from left, Ferid Pasha's step-son Sami Bey, third from left Ali Kemal Bey, to his right Ferid Pasha, visiting Galatasaray High School

He succeeded Ahmet Tevfik Pasha on 4 March 1919 and on 9 March initiated a campaign of arrests of former Unionist ministers: Halil Menteşe, Ali Fethi Okyar and Ali Münif Yeğenağa amongst others. Ferid Pasha was an ardent anglophile, who hoped to receive less harsh peace terms by presenting the Ottoman Empire as a more cooperative partner in the Eastern Mediterranean than Greece. He was known to say "After God, me and the Sultan rely on England". However his first term as grand vizier coincided with the Occupation of Smyrna by the Greek army and the ensuing turmoil. He was informed by the Assistant British High Commissioner Admiral Richard Webb the day before of Greece's intent to occupy Smyrna per Article VII of the Mudros terms on a phone call, causing him to faint and wake enraged of the Allied powers' perfidy. He was said to have concluded resistance was the only path forward, but it is unknown why he changed his mind. The occupation of Smyrna turned out to be catastrophic not only for Greece's international reputation, but also that of Ottoman anglophiles, and to that extent, Ferid's Pasha's government. He resigned the same day, but Sultan Mehmed VI reappointed him to the premiership.

Later that summer he was invited by the Allies to head an Ottoman delegation to the Paris Peace Conference. The Sultan assigned Tevfik Pasha to come along with him, as he didn't trust Ferid. Ferid presented the position that the Ottoman Empire must return to its pre-war borders, and was laughed out of the peace conference. Upon returning to Constantinople, he again resigned, but was again reappointed to the Grand Vizierate. He attempted to prevent the Sivas Congress from convening under the leadership of Mustafa Kemal Pasha, but this effort failed. Upon the conclusion of the congress, Kemal ordered Ottoman civil servants to cut communications with the capital, and initiated a wave of coups d'état against local governors resisting the nationalists. On 2 October 1919, Ferid's government again collapsed and he officially resigned for health reasons. Mehmed VI appointed Ali Rıza Pasha to the Sublime Porte to heed nationalist demands.

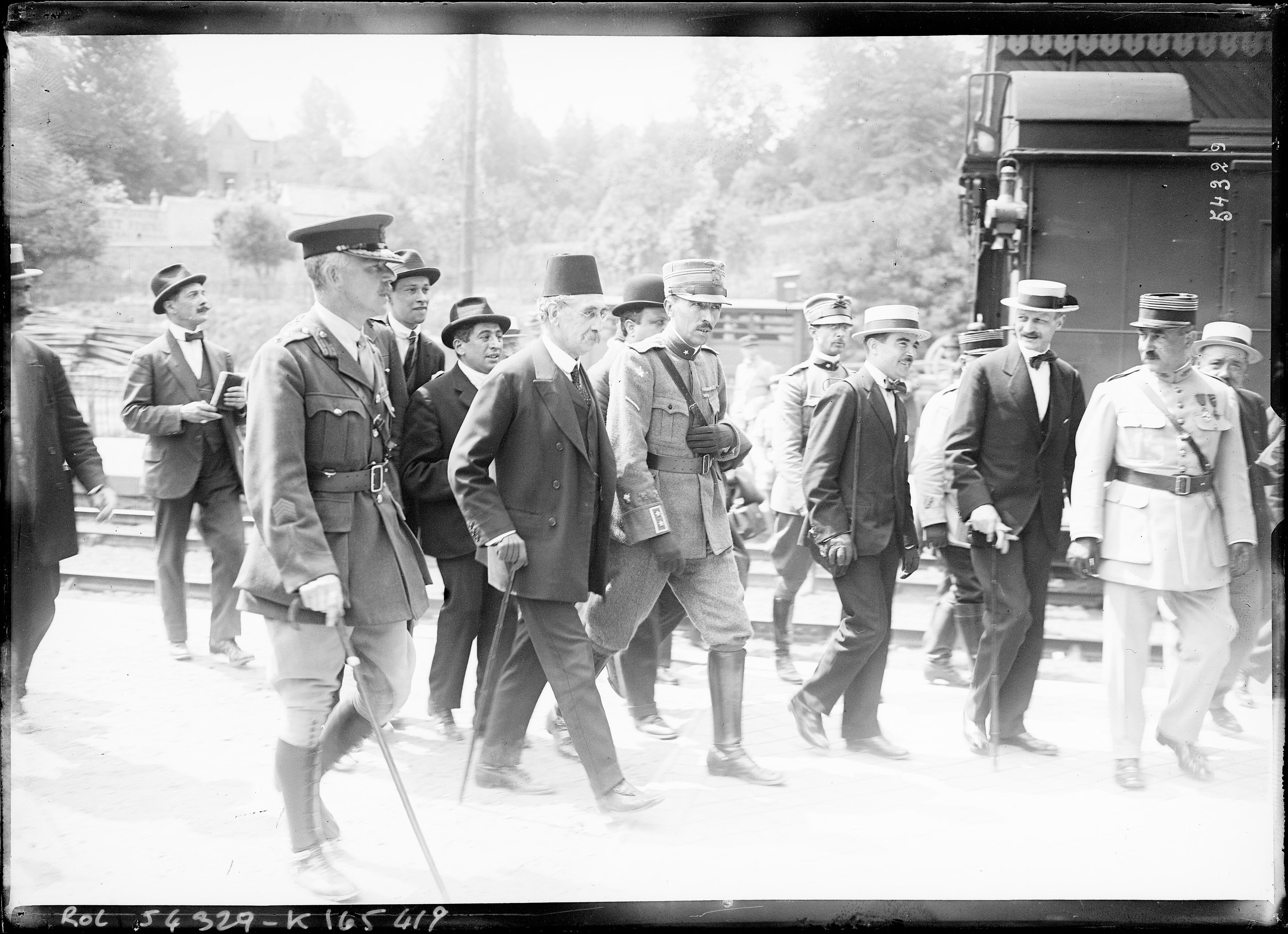
Ferid Pasha arriving at Vaucresson, 12 June 1919

After two short-lived governments under Rıza Pasha and Hulusi Salih Pasha, Sultan Mehmed VI had to call Ferid back to form a new government on 5 April 1920. He remained as Grand Vizier until 17 October 1920, forming two different cabinets in between.

Ferid's second term coincided with the closure of the Ottoman Parliament under pressure from the British and French forces of occupation. He organized the Disciplinary Forces against the nationalists, the Ahmed Anzavur rebellion, and then the Siege of Dolmabahçe Palace. Along with four other notables, he agreed to sign the Treaty of Sèvres, comprising disastrous conditions for Turkey, which caused an uproar of reaction towards him. A plan to assassinate him in early June 1920 failed when the lead conspirator Dramalı Rıza turned in his accomplices to the police, and Dramalı Rıza was executed.

Ferid Pasha was not one of the signatories of the Treaty itself, but together with the three signatories he would be nevertheless stripped of his citizenship by the Grand National Assembly during the week of the treaty's signature and would head the list of 150 persona non grata of Turkey after the Turkish War of Independence. In the face of continued allied duplicity, he and his step-son Sami Bey began to send weapons to the Turkish nationalists by building storage depots in his mansion and sending them off to smugglers.

== Later career and exile ==
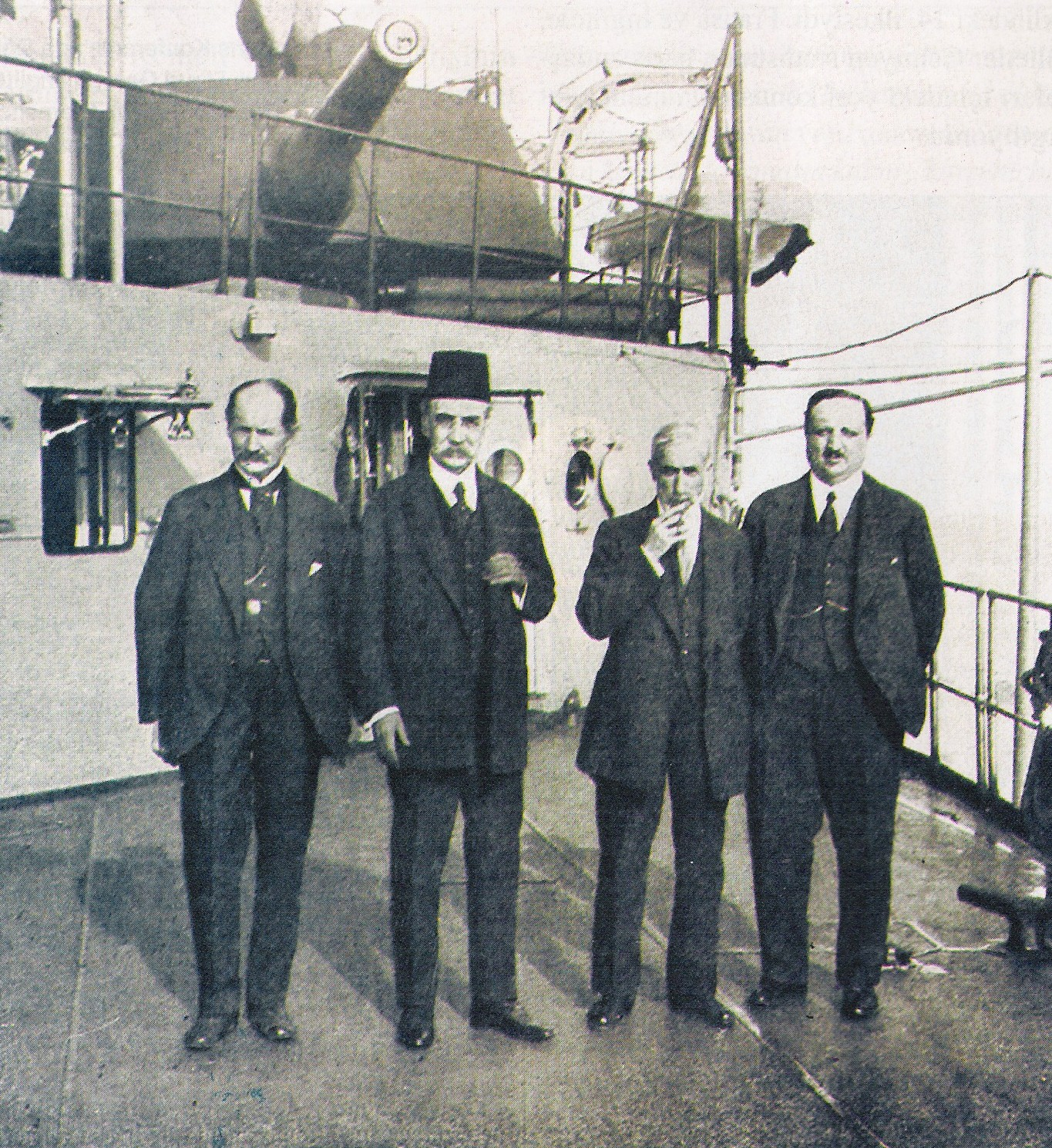
Damad Ferid Pasha (wearing the fez) with the three other signatories of the Treaty of Sèvres; to his right, Rıza Tevfik Bölükbaşı, to his left, minister of finance Mehmet Tevfik Biren and the ambassador Reşad Halis; on board an Allied warship taking them to the Paris Peace Conference.

Even after his dismissal, and the formation of a new Ottoman Government under Ahmet Tevfik Pasha, he remained widely disliked (especially in Anatolia). With the Turkish victory in the Greco-Turkish War, he and his family fled to Marseille on 22 September 1922. He died from duodenal cancer in Nice, France, on 6 October 1923, the same day that nationalist forces entered Constantinople, and was buried in the city of Sidon, Lebanon.

He wrote a 12 volume memoir which he entrusted to Reşad Halis, who was persona non grata in the Turkish Republic, and was exiled in Paris. Years later, when fuel was hard to come by in German-occupied France, Halis put these memoirs in his stove to heat his house.

== Personality and assessments ==
According to Tevfik Pasha, "he surpassed even the Franks [westerners] in being alafranga [western mannerisms]" ("alafrangalıkta Frenkleri bile geçmiş idi").

According to an article published in the conservative Tevhid-i Efkâr newspaper at the time of his death, "When he returned from London, he became a foreigner (alafranga) and eventually an enemy of Islam. The male and female servants in his house were all Greeks. In his words, speeches, and writings, he always talked of Greek and Latin proverbs, superstitions, and mythology. (...) In short, he became completely Westernized, but he was a man with a cosmopolitan spirit, completely devoid of national feelings."

For sporting manicured nails, common among upper class western men of the time, and wearing patent leather shoes, the gardeners of Baltalimanı referred to him as Gâvur Pasha.

Refik Halid Karay compared Ferid Pasha's leadership to one of an inept cavalryman:

...I can understand not getting off the back of a horse of fortune. Even staying until the last moment... But either that horse is used to you or you trust the bit and are sure of the blow of the whip... Otherwise, if there is neither familiarity in the horse, nor strength in the gun, nor fortitude in the hand, then a person turns into a clumsy clown in an acrobat’s shop!...

Despite the clarity in their politics and the sincerity in their ideas, Damad Ferid Pasha’s cabinets were always like this, they thought they could stand with a hidden power in a task that they could not accomplish without organization and support, and one day they would hold on to the head, tail, and mane of the animal and assume the position of a cavalryman on its back, but they couldn't do it.

== See also ==
- List of Ottoman grand viziers
- Chronology of the Turkish War of Independence

Political offices
Preceded by Ahmet Tevfik Pasha	Grand Vizier of the Ottoman Empire; 4 March 1919 – 2 October 1919	Succeeded by Ali Rıza Pasha
Preceded by Salih Hulusi Pasha	Grand Vizier of the Ottoman Empire; 5 April 1920 – 21 October 1920	Succeeded by Ahmet Tevfik Pasha
