= Ahmet Reşit Rey =

Turkish politician

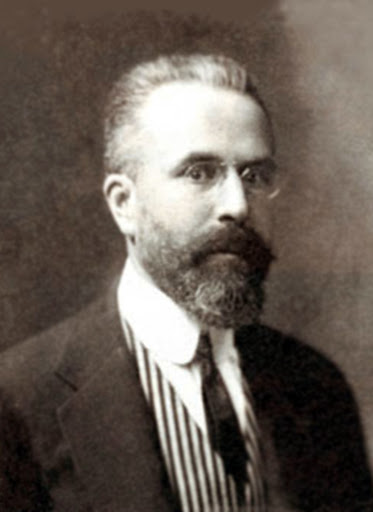

Personal details
- Born: 1870 Çankırı, Ottoman Empire
- Died: 1955 (aged 84–85) Istanbul, Turkey

Ahmet Reşit Rey (1870 – 1955) was an Ottoman liberal politician and government minister, who served as Interior Minister twice in 1912-1913 and in 1920, serving his second term in the cabinet of Damat Ferid Pasha. He was the father of composer Cemal Reşit Rey.
