= Turkish art =

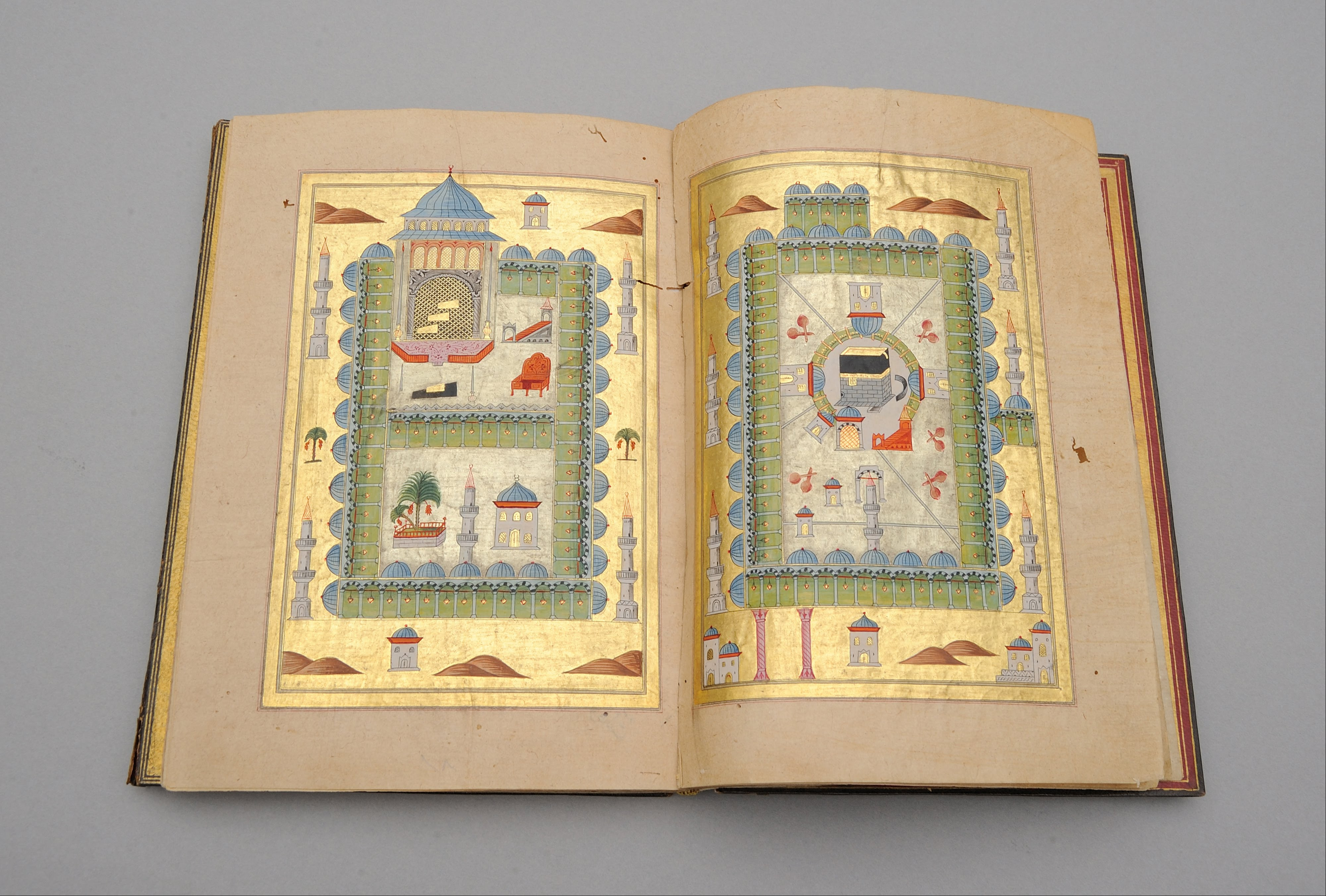
Ottoman illumination is an art form of the Ottoman Empire

Turkish art (Turkish: Türk sanatı) refers to all works of visual art originating from the geographical area of what is present day Turkey since the arrival of the Turks in the Middle Ages. Turkey also was the home of much significant art produced by earlier cultures, including the Hittites, Ancient Greeks, and Byzantines. Ottoman art is therefore the dominant element of Turkish art before the 20th century, although the Seljuks and other earlier Turks also contributed. The 16th and 17th centuries are generally recognized as the finest period for art in the Ottoman Empire, much of it associated with the huge Imperial court. In particular the long reign of Suleiman the Magnificent from 1520 to 1566 brought a combination, rare in any ruling dynasty, of political and military success with strong encouragement of the arts.

The nakkashane, as the palace workshops are now generally known, were evidently very important and productive, but though there is a fair amount of surviving documentation, much remains unclear about how they operated. They operated over many different media, but apparently not including pottery or textiles, with the craftsmen or artists apparently a mixture of slaves, especially Persians, captured in war (at least in the early periods), trained Turks, and foreign specialists. They were not necessarily physically located in the palace, and may have been able to undertake work for other clients as well as the sultan. Many specialities were passed from father to son.

== Seljuk period ==
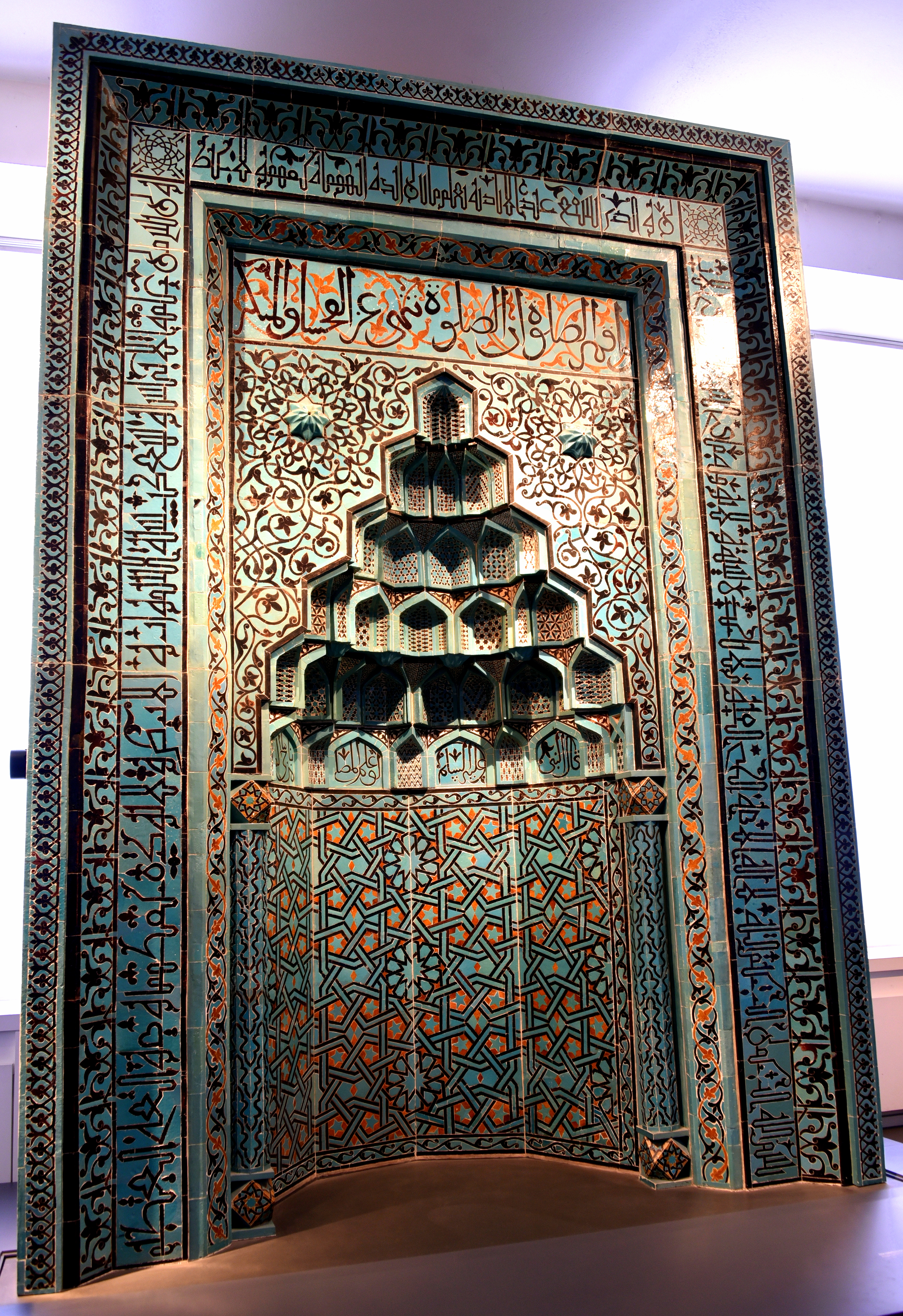
Tiled mihrab from the Beyhekim Mosque in Konya, 13th century CE, Museum of Islamic Art, Berlin

The Seljuks of Rum, who rose to power in Anatolia during the late 11th century, ruled a multi-ethnic territory that was only recently settled by Muslims. As a result, their architecture was eclectic and incorporated influences from many cultures in the region. Most Anatolian Seljuk buildings are constructed of dressed stone, with brick reserved for minarets. The use of stone in Anatolia is the biggest difference with the Seljuk buildings in Iran, which are made of bricks. This also resulted in more of their monuments being preserved up to modern times. In their construction of caravanserais, madrasas and mosques, the Anatolian Seljuks translated earlier Iranian Seljuk architecture of bricks and plaster into the use of stone.

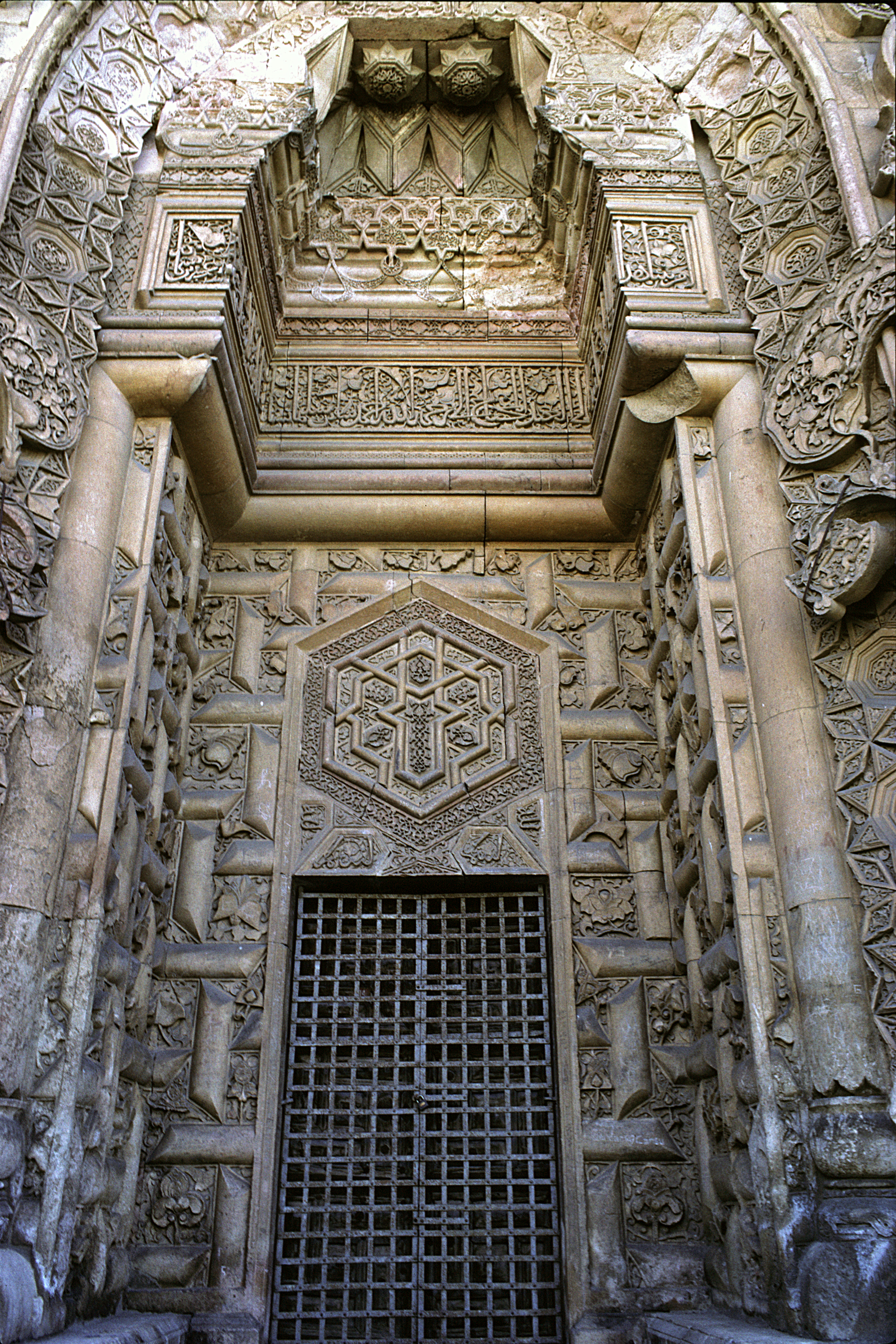
Stone-carved portal of the Great Mosque of Divriği, built by the House of Mengüjek in the early 13th century, under Anatolian Seljuk rule

Decoration in Anatolian Seljuk architecture was concentrated on certain elements like entrance portals, windows, and the mihrabs of mosques. Stone-carving was one of the most accomplished mediums of decoration, with motifs ranging from earlier Iranian stucco motifs to local Byzantine and Armenian motifs. Muqarnas was also used. The madrasas of Sivas and the Ince Minareli Medrese in Konya are among the most notable examples, while the Great Mosque and Hospital complex of Divriği is distinguished by the most extravagant and eclectic high-relief stone decoration around its entrance portals and its mihrab. Syrian-style ablaq striped marble also appears on the entrance portal of the Karatay Medrese and the Alaeddin Mosque in Konya. Although tilework was commonly used in Iran, Anatolian architecture innovated in the use of tile revetments to cover entire surfaces independently of other forms of decoration, as seen in the Karatay Medrese.

== Ottoman period ==
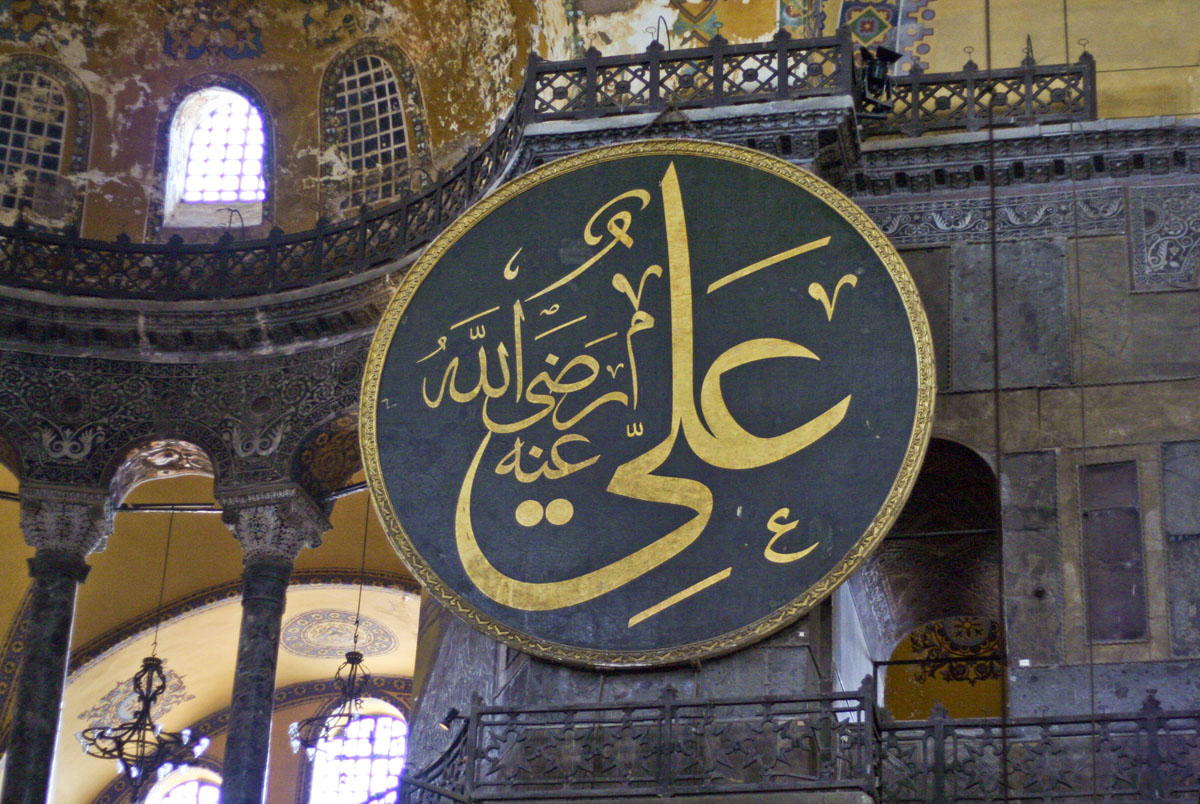
Thuluth script calligraphy of Ali decorating the Hagia Sophia Grand Mosque

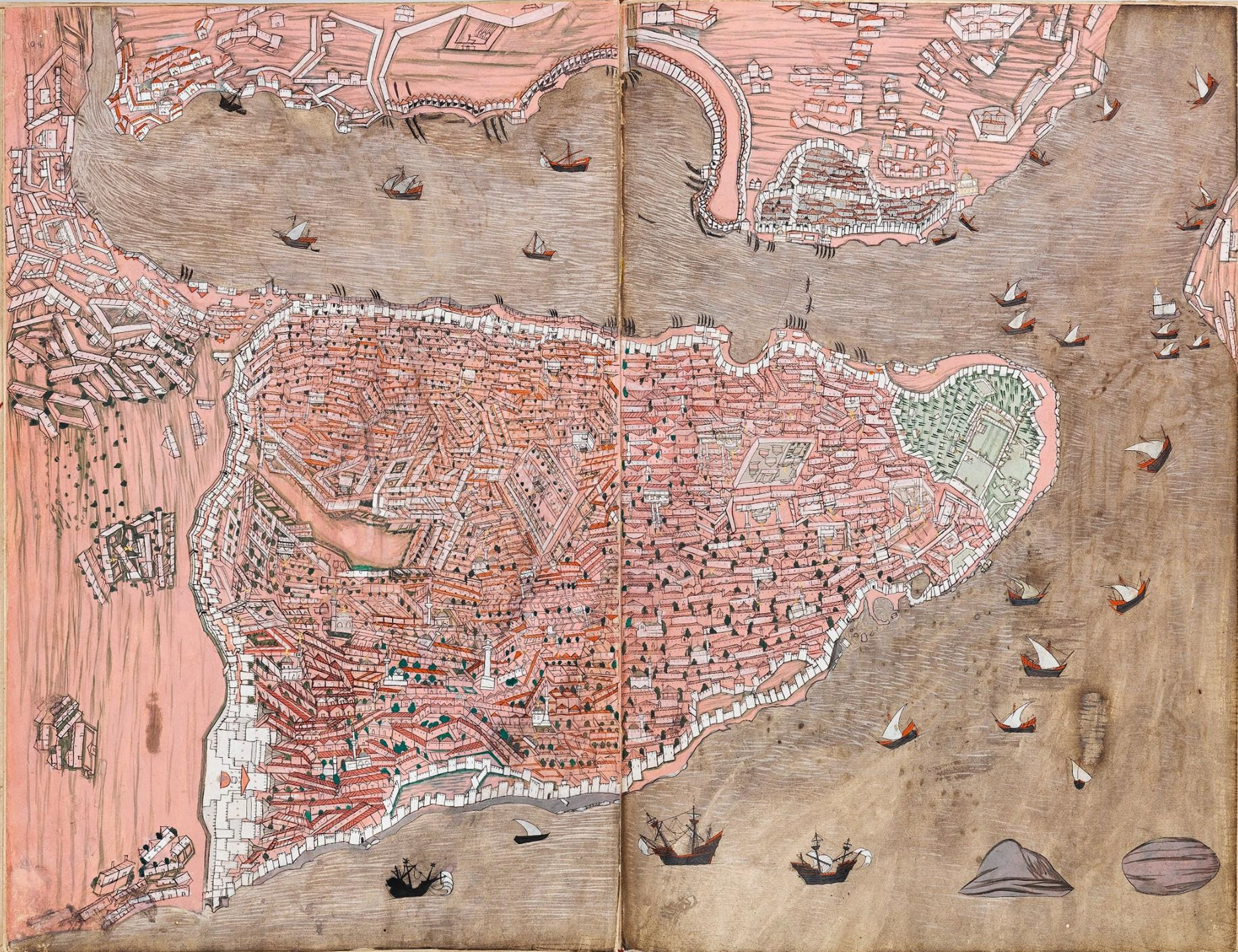
Map of Constantinople in Hunername-I, an example of Ottoman miniature

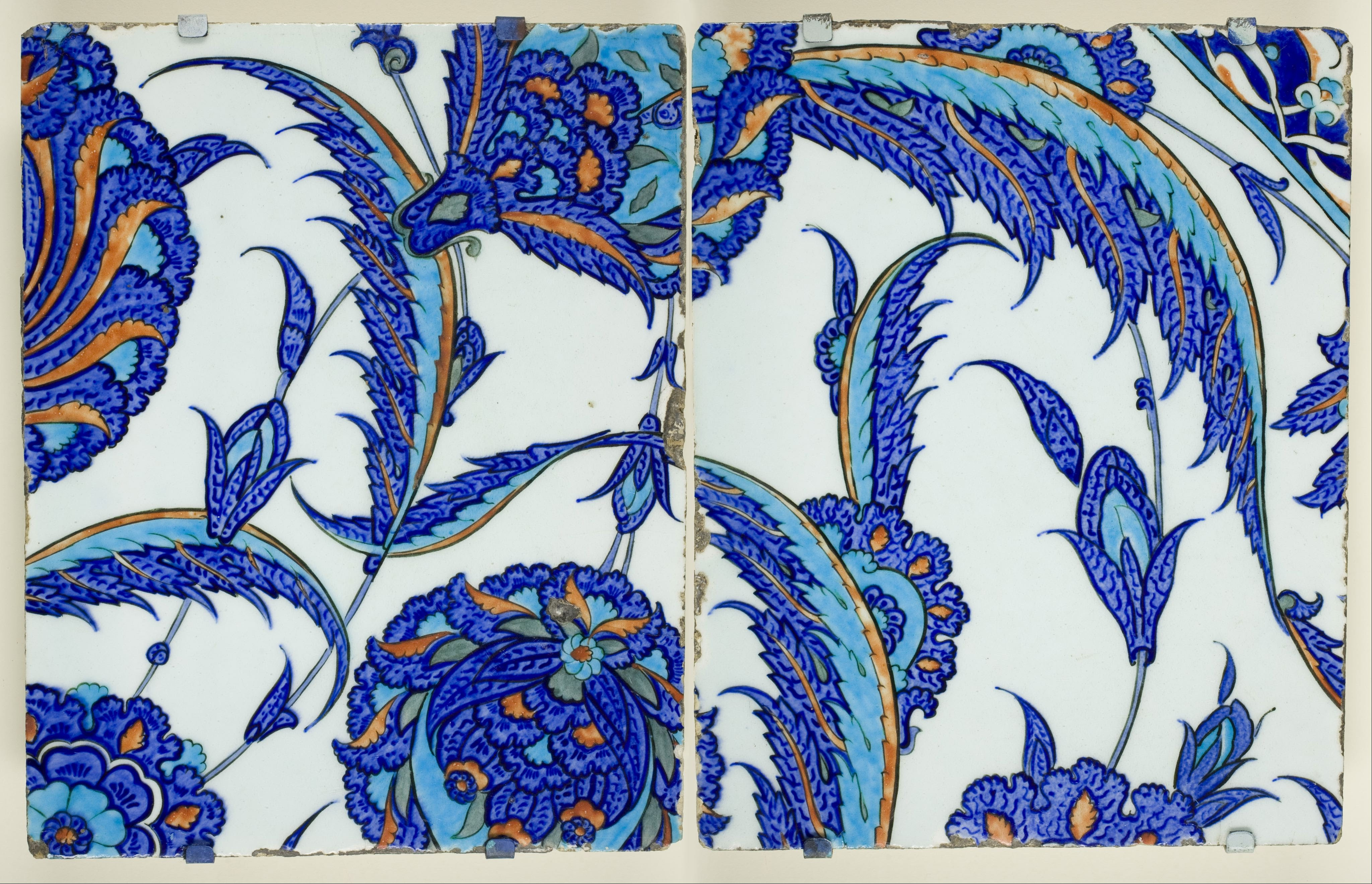
Two tiles, circa 1560, fritware, painted in blue, turquoise, red, green, and black under a transparent glaze, Art Institute of Chicago (Chicago, USA)

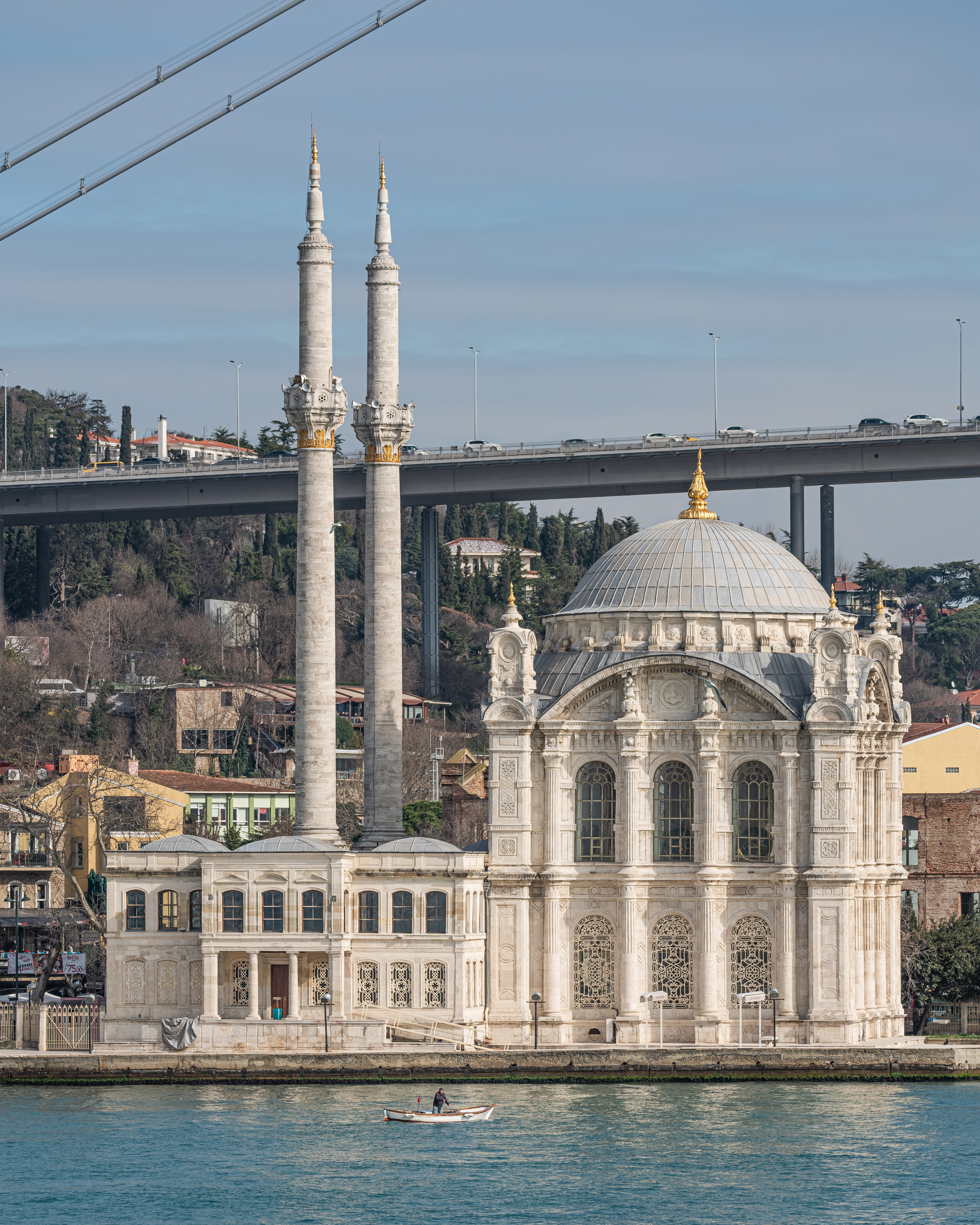
Ortaköy Mosque is a neo-baroque example of the Westernization of late Ottoman architecture

Ottoman architecture developed traditional Islamic styles, with some technical influences from Europe, into a highly sophisticated style, with interiors richly decorated in coloured tiles, seen in palaces, mosques and turbe mausolea.

Other forms of art represented developments of earlier Islamic art, especially those of Persia, but with a distinct Turkish character. As in Persia, Chinese porcelain was avidly collected by the Ottoman court, and represented another important influence, mainly on decoration. Ottoman miniature and Ottoman illumination cover the figurative and non-figurative elements of the decoration of manuscripts, which tend to be treated as distinct genres, though often united in the same manuscript and page.

The reign of the Ottomans in the 16th and early 17th centuries introduced the Turkish form of Islamic calligraphy. This art form reached the height of its popularity during the reign of Suleiman the Magnificent (1520–66). As decorative as it was communicative, Diwani was distinguished by the complexity of the line within the letter and the close juxtaposition of the letters within the word. The hilya is an illuminated sheet with Islamic calligraphy of a description of the Islamic prophet Muhammad. The tughra is an elaborately stylized formal signature of the sultan, which like the hilya performed some of the functions of portraits in Christian Europe. Book covers were also elaborately decorated.

Other important media were in the applied or decorative arts rather than figurative work. Pottery, especially İznik pottery, jewellery, hardstone carvings, Turkish carpets, woven and embroidered silk textiles were all produced to extremely high standards, and carpets in particular were exported widely. Other Turkish art ranges from metalwork, carved woodwork and furniture with elaborate inlays to traditional Ebru or paper marbling.

=== 18th to 20th centuries ===
In the 18th and 19th centuries Turkish art and architecture became more heavily influenced by contemporary European styles, leading to over-elaborated and fussy detail in decoration. European-style painting was slow to be adopted, with Osman Hamdi Bey (1842–1910) for long a somewhat solitary figure. He was a member of the Ottoman administrative elite who trained in Paris, and painted throughout his long career as a senior administrator and curator in Turkey. Many of his works represent the subjects of Orientalism from the inside, as it were.

Alongside the broader European influences on decoration, the period also saw the synthesis of foreign techniques with traditional Ottoman tastes to create new art forms. A notable example is Çeşm-i Bülbül (literally "Nightingale's Eye"), a distinctive type of decorative glassware developed in the late 18th to early 19th centuries.

== 20th century and onward ==
A transition from Islamic artistic traditions under the Ottoman Empire to a more secular, Western orientation has taken place in Turkey. Modern Turkish painters are striving to find their own art forms, free from Western influence. Sculpture is less developed, and public monuments are usually heroic representations of Atatürk and events from the war of independence. Literature is considered the most advanced of contemporary Turkish arts.

== Repatriation of looted art ==
In 2024, a bronze statue of the head of a youth was returned to Turkey by the J. Paul Getty Museum and a bronze statue of the head of Roman Emperor Septimius Severus was to be returned to Turkey by Denmark's NY Carlsberg Glypotek Museum. Originating in the ancient city of Boubon in Burdur, they were looted in illegal excavations in the 1960s. Turkey requested that the Cleveland Museum of Art return 21 objects but the museum refused saying the Turkey lacked proof of looting causing a clash with the Manhattan District Attorney and the unit that fights Antiquities Trafficking.

== Gallery ==
=== Architecture ===
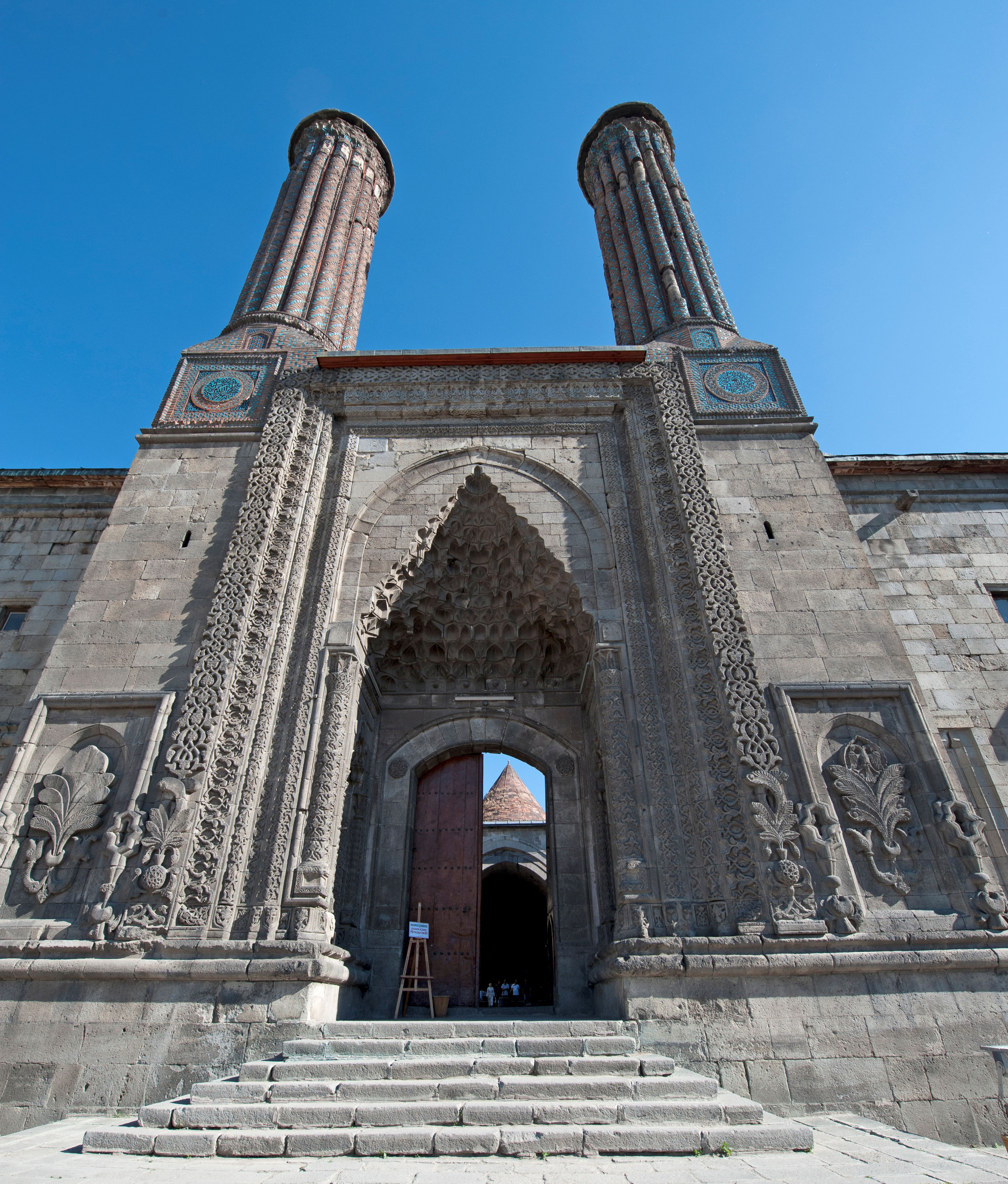
Entrance of the Çifte Minareli Medrese in Erzurum (c. 1250)

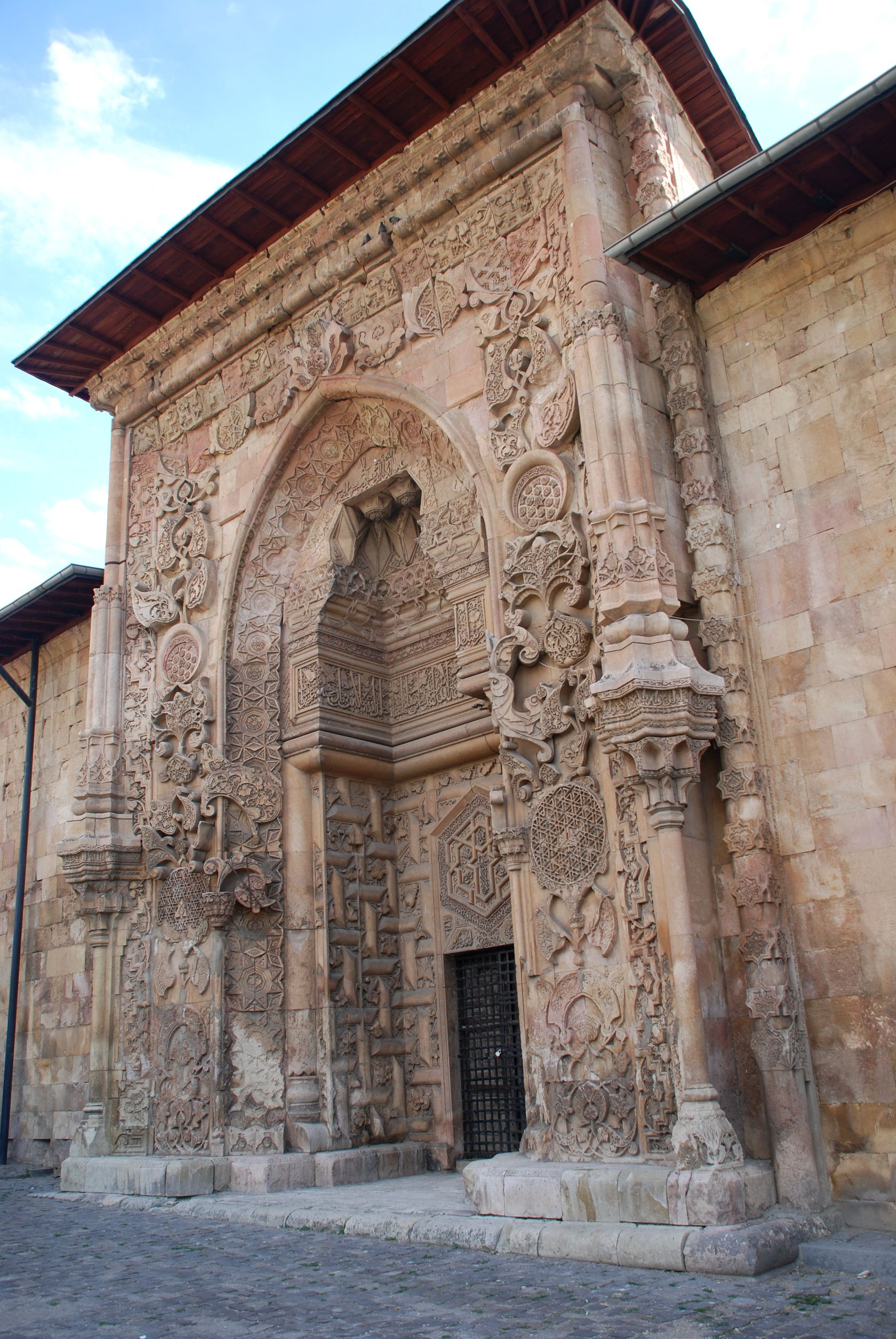
Entrance of the Divriği Mosque, Sivas (c. 1229)

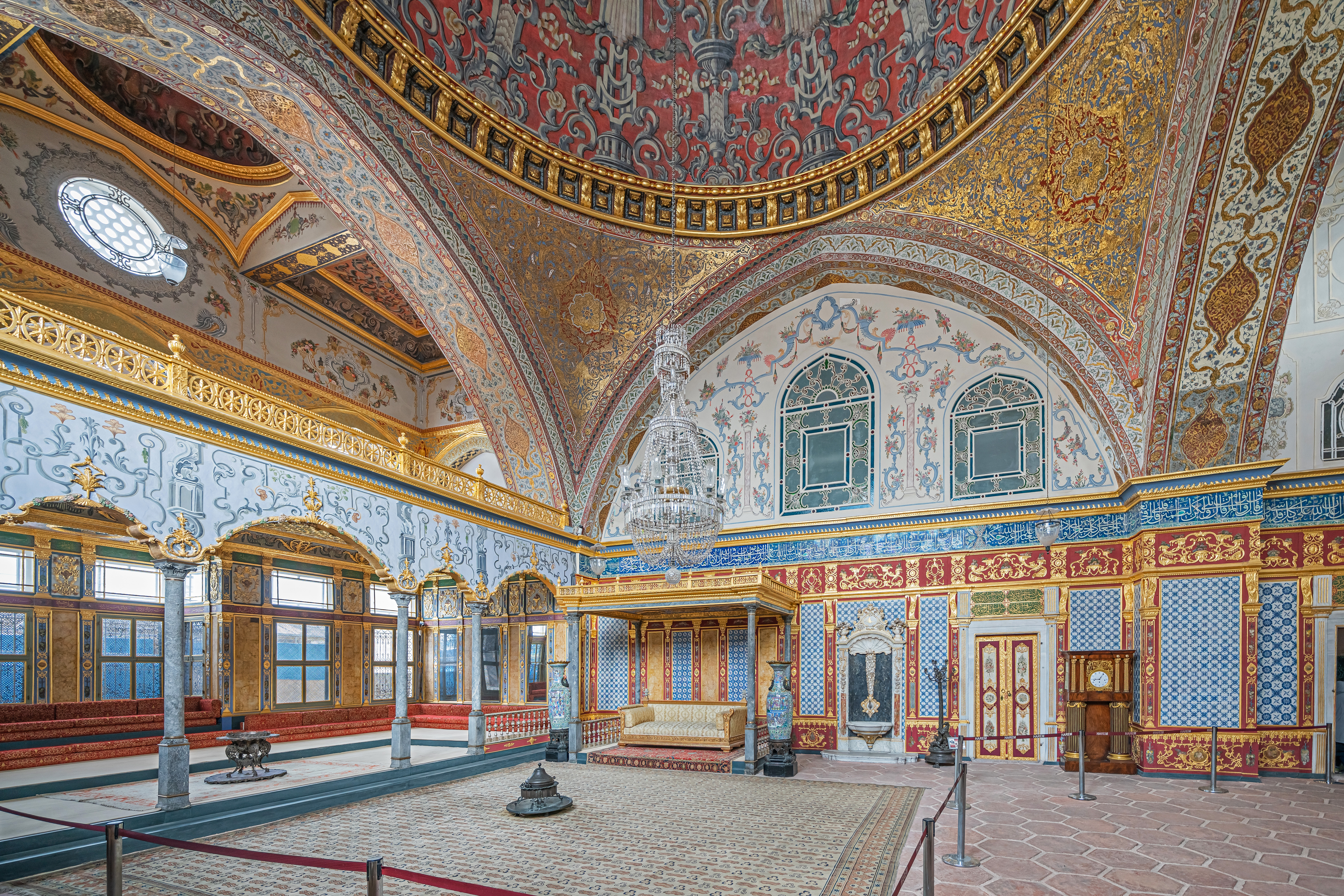
Imperial Hall in Harem of Topkapı Palace in Istanbul

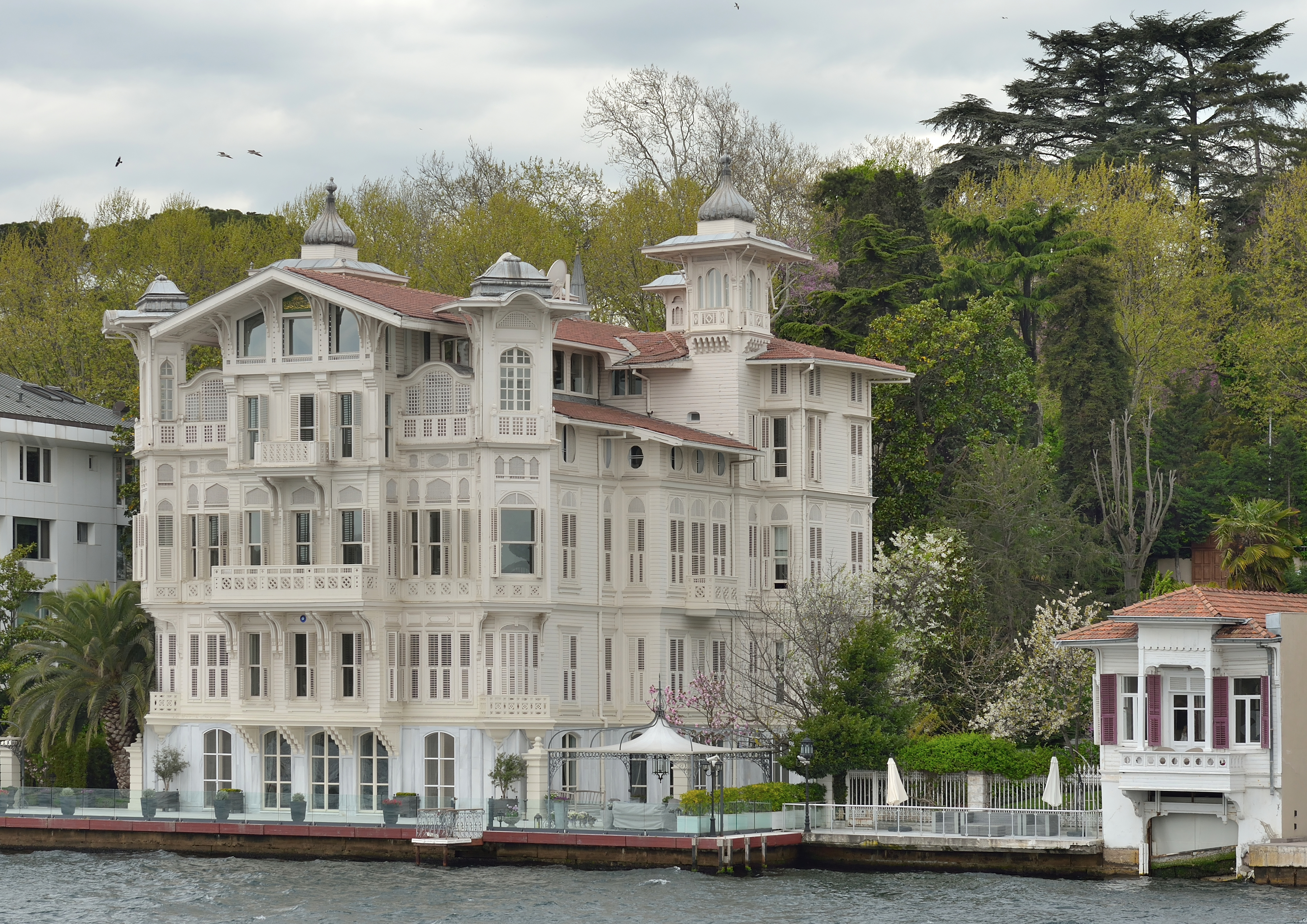
Istanbul Yalı architecture

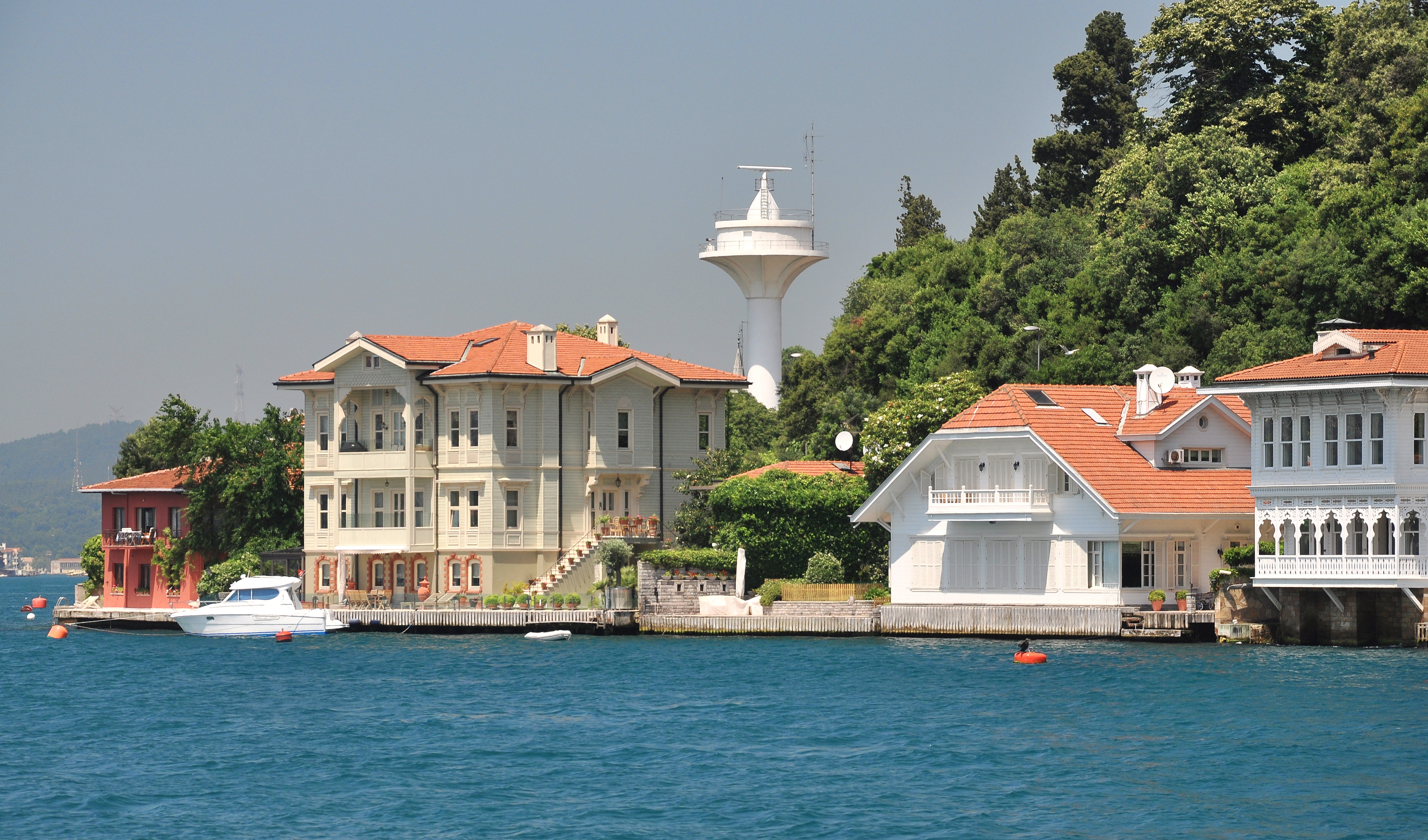
An example of the Yalı architecture

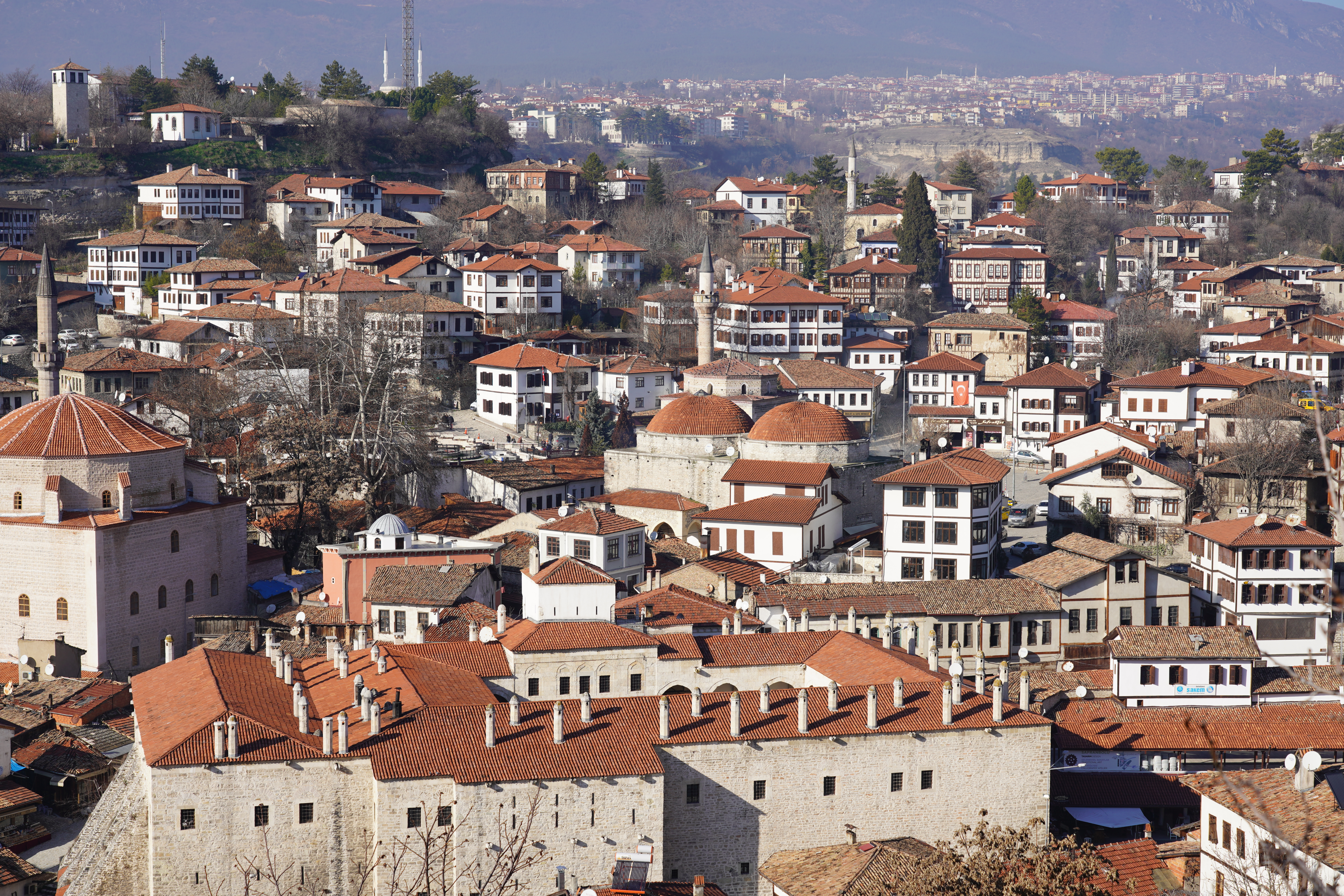
Safranbolu, an Ottoman village

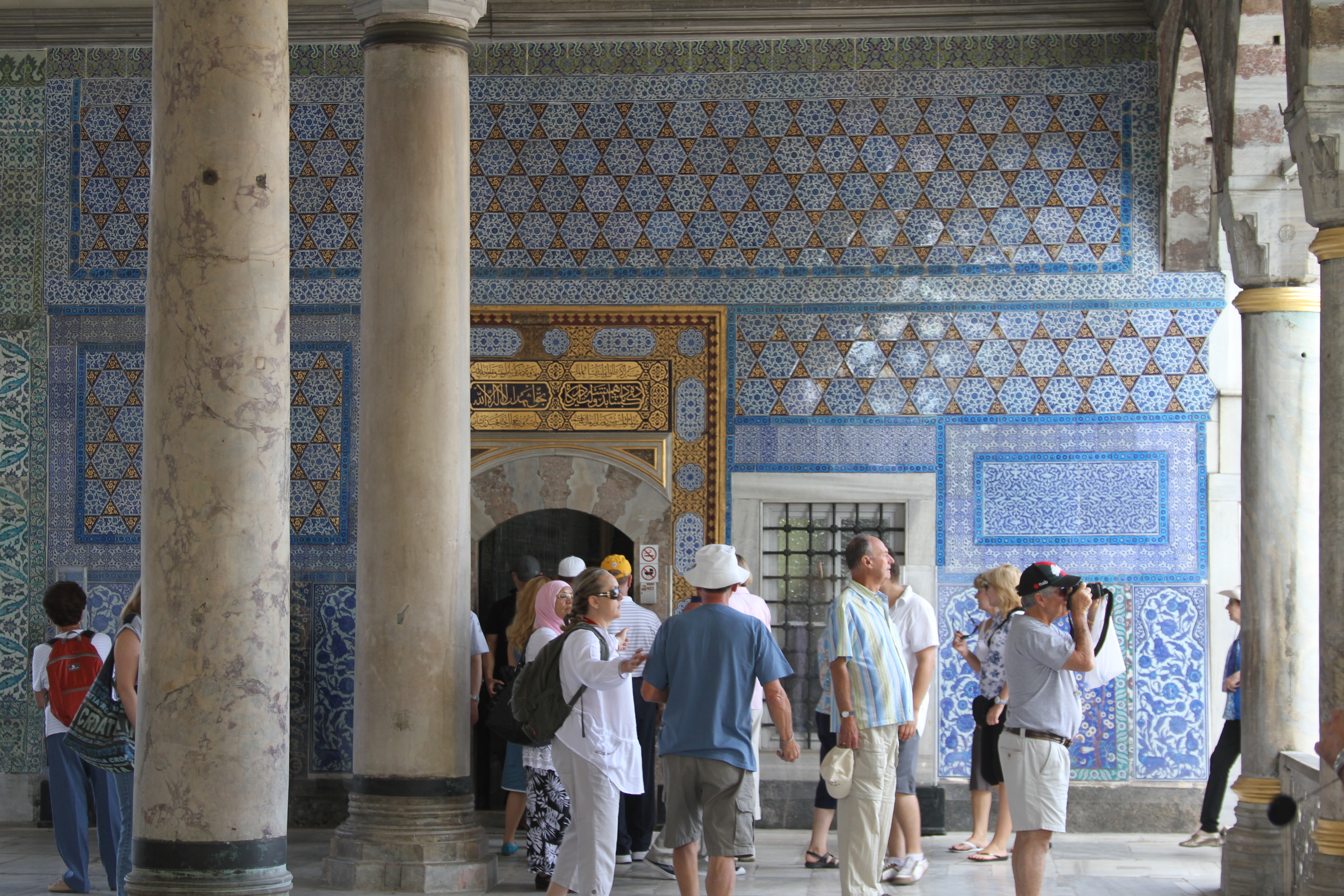
Iznik Tiles in Topkapı Palace

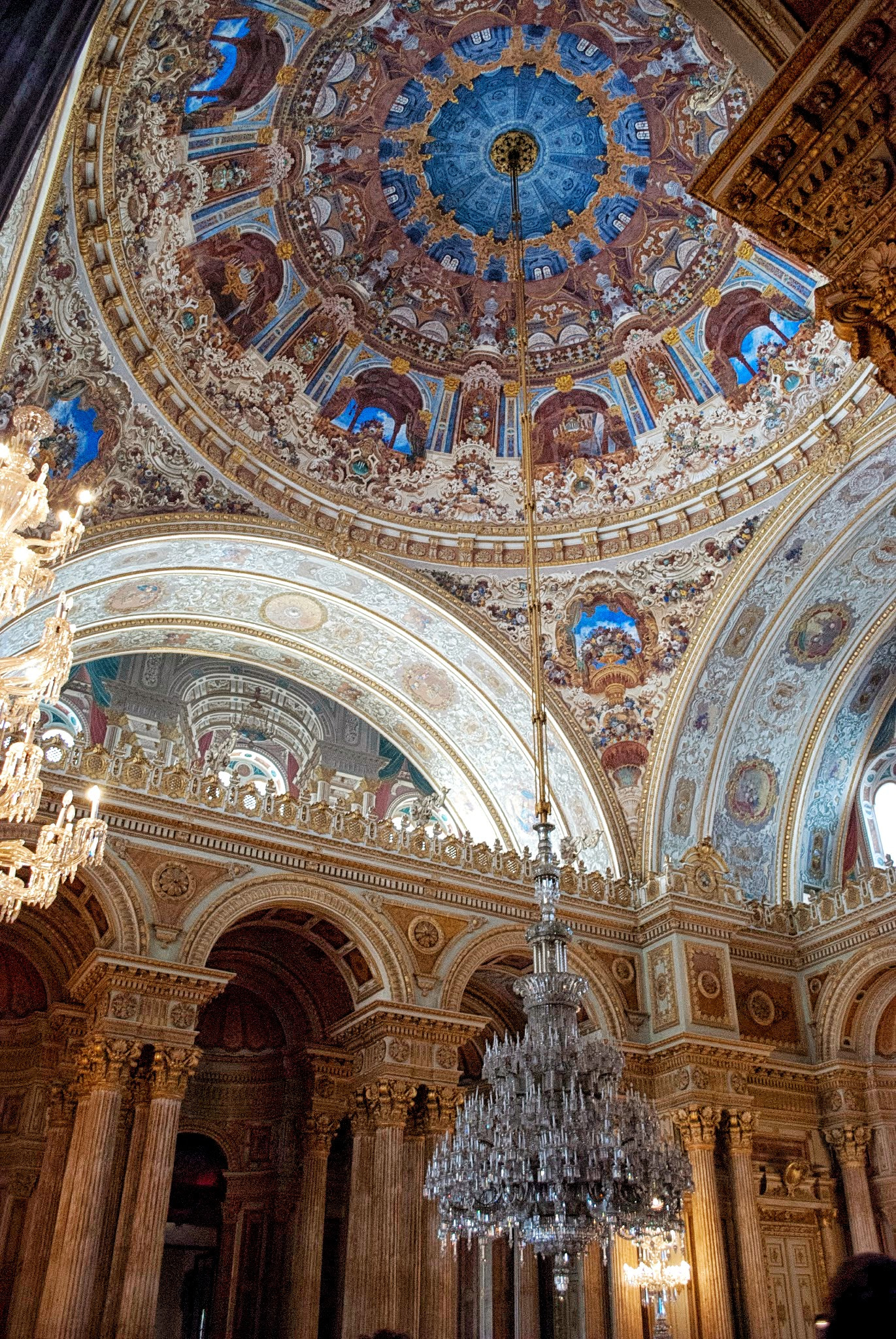
Interior of a dome at Dolmabahçe Palace

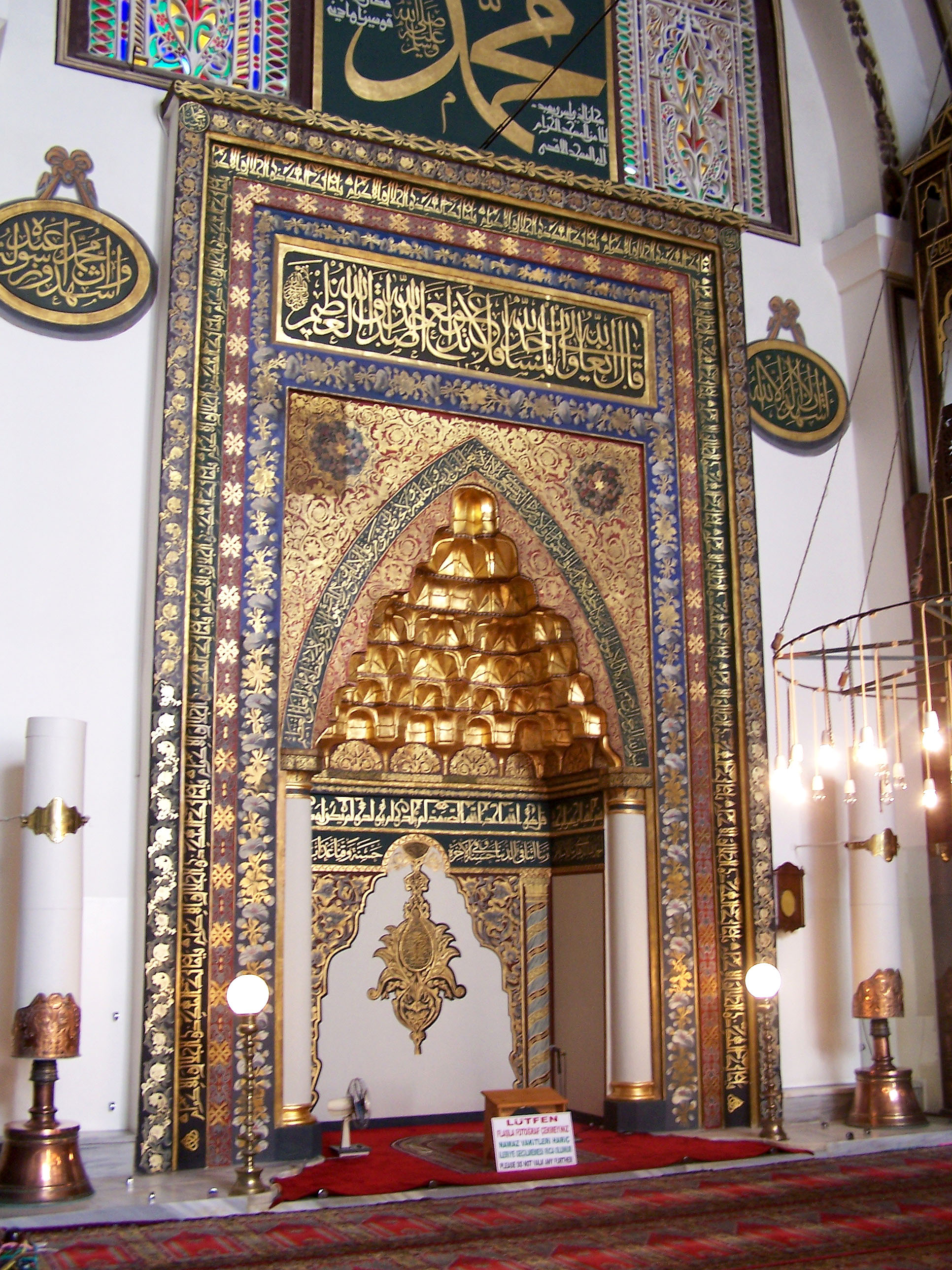
Mihrab niche of Bursa Grand Mosque

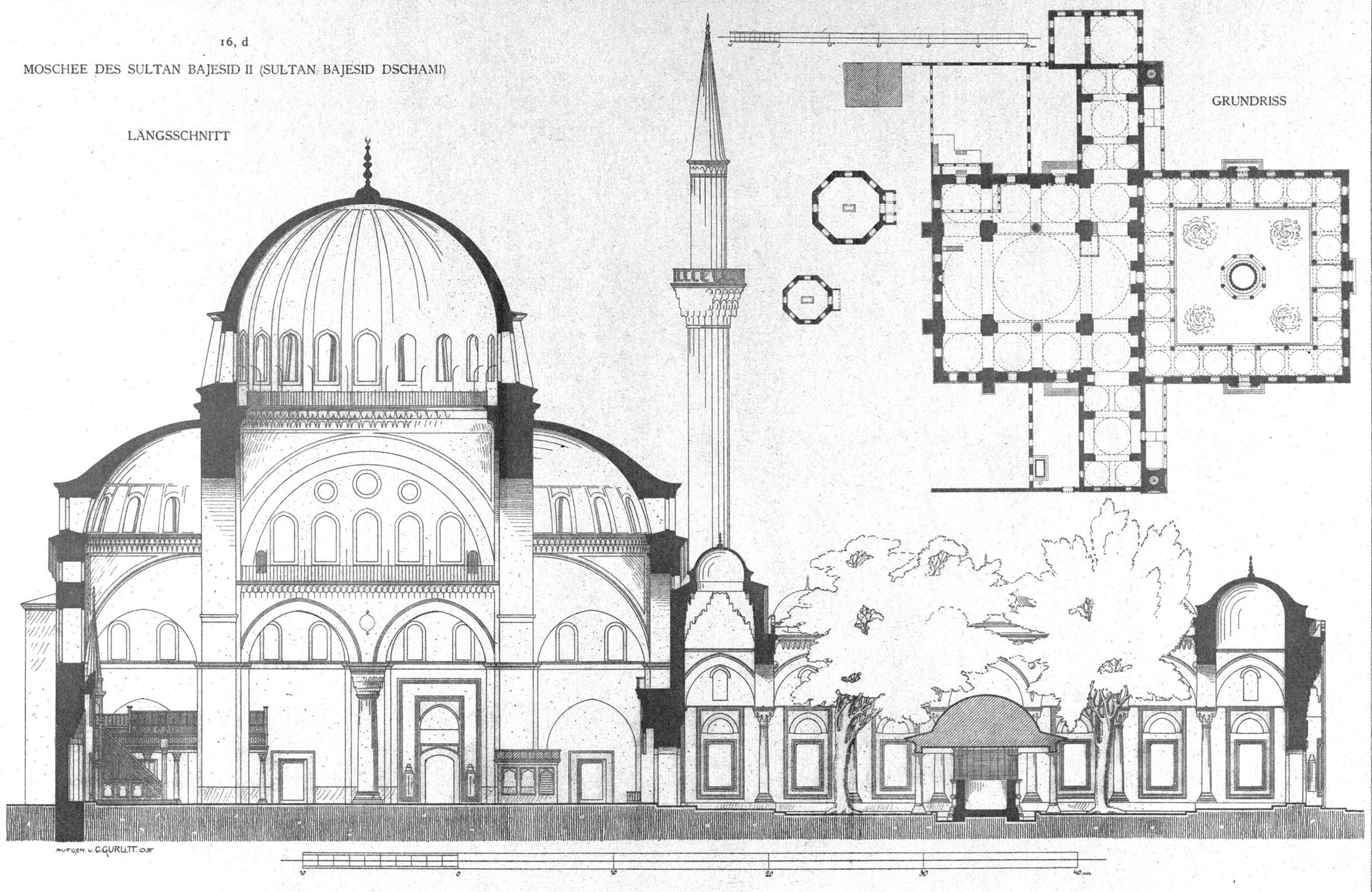
Cross section and plan of Bayezid II Mosque, the oldest imperial complex in Istanbul that is preserved in more or less its original form

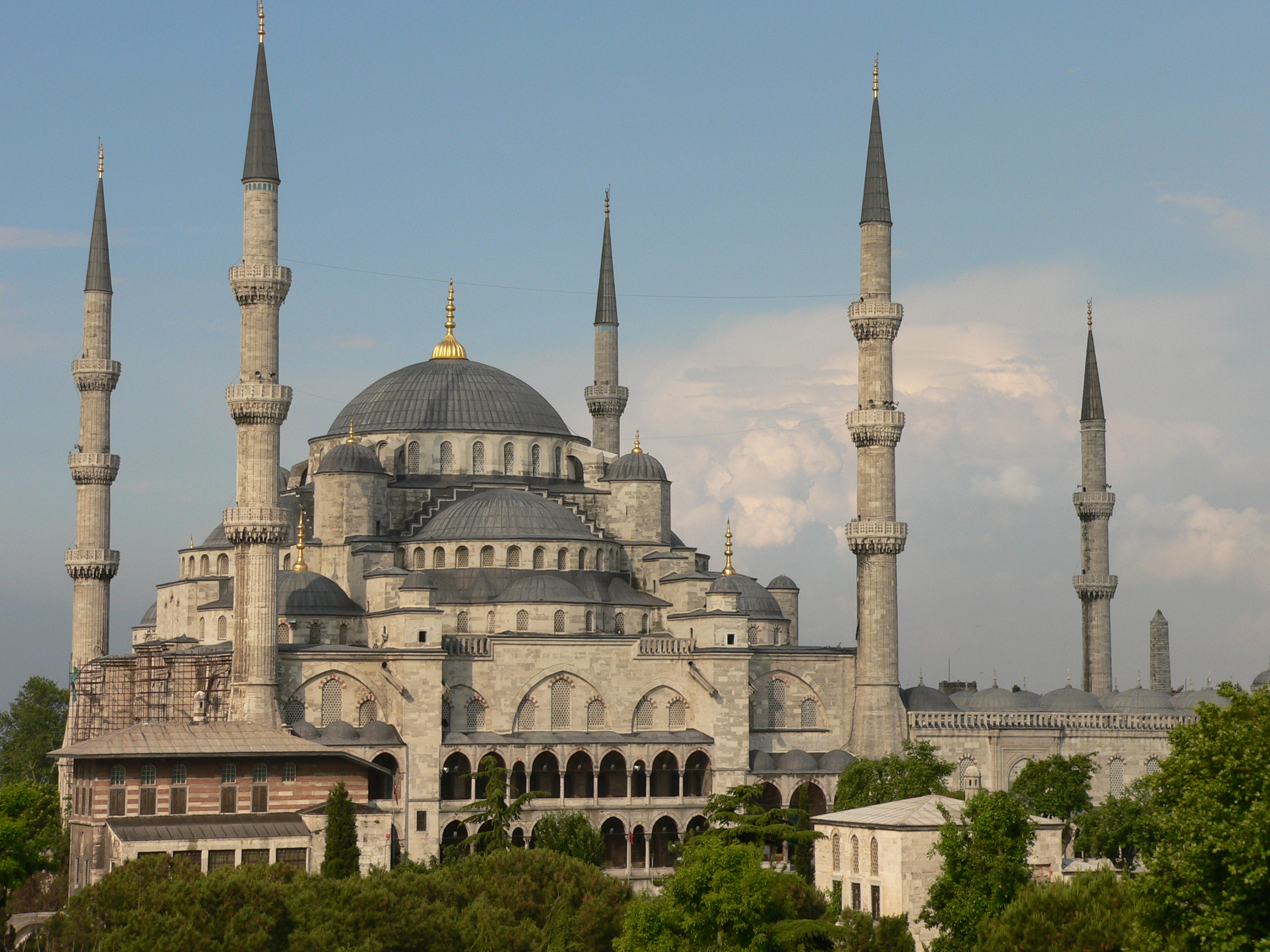
Blue Mosque in Istanbul, an example of the classical style of Ottoman architecture

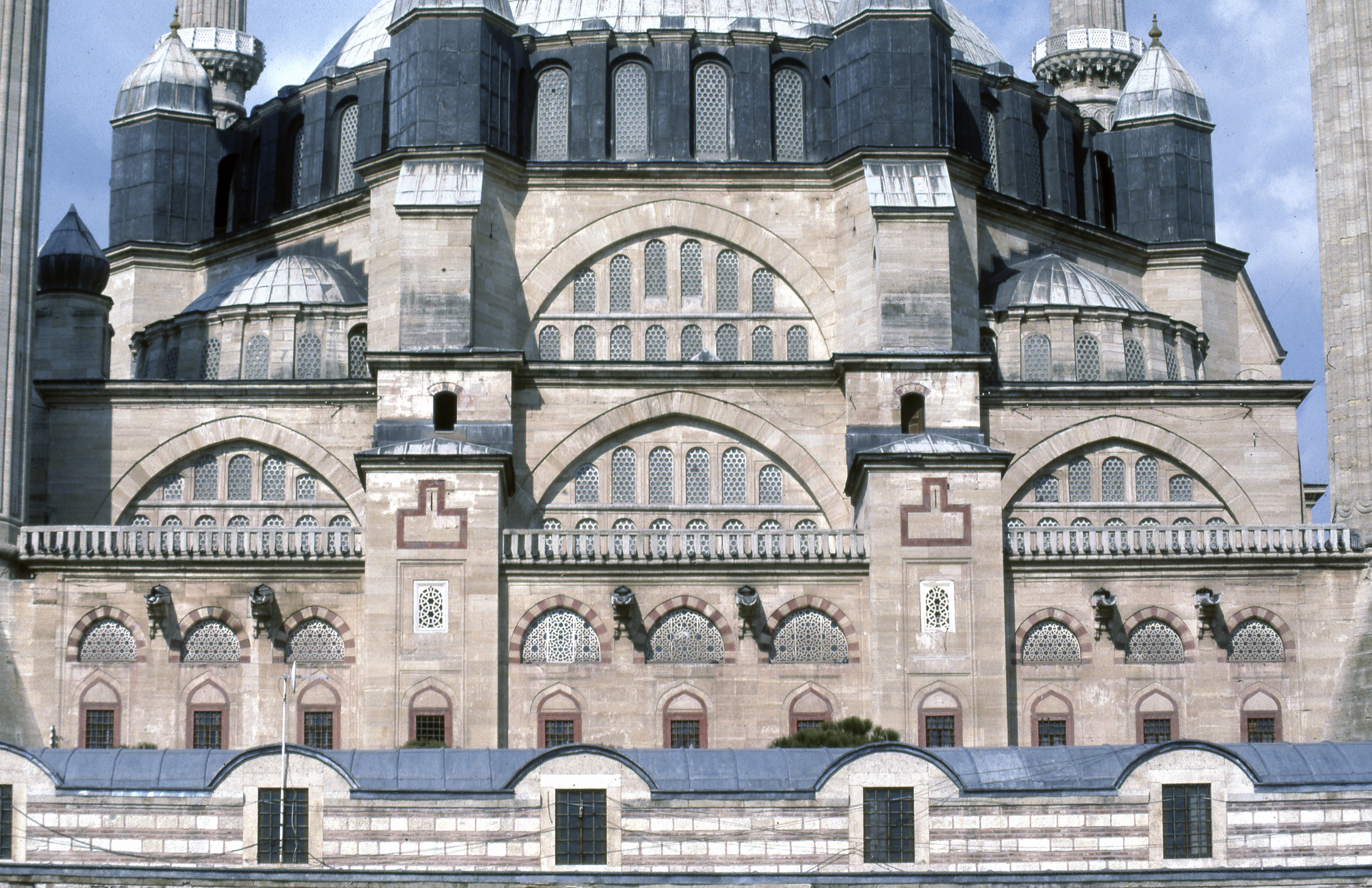
Exterior design of Selimiye Mosque, Edirne

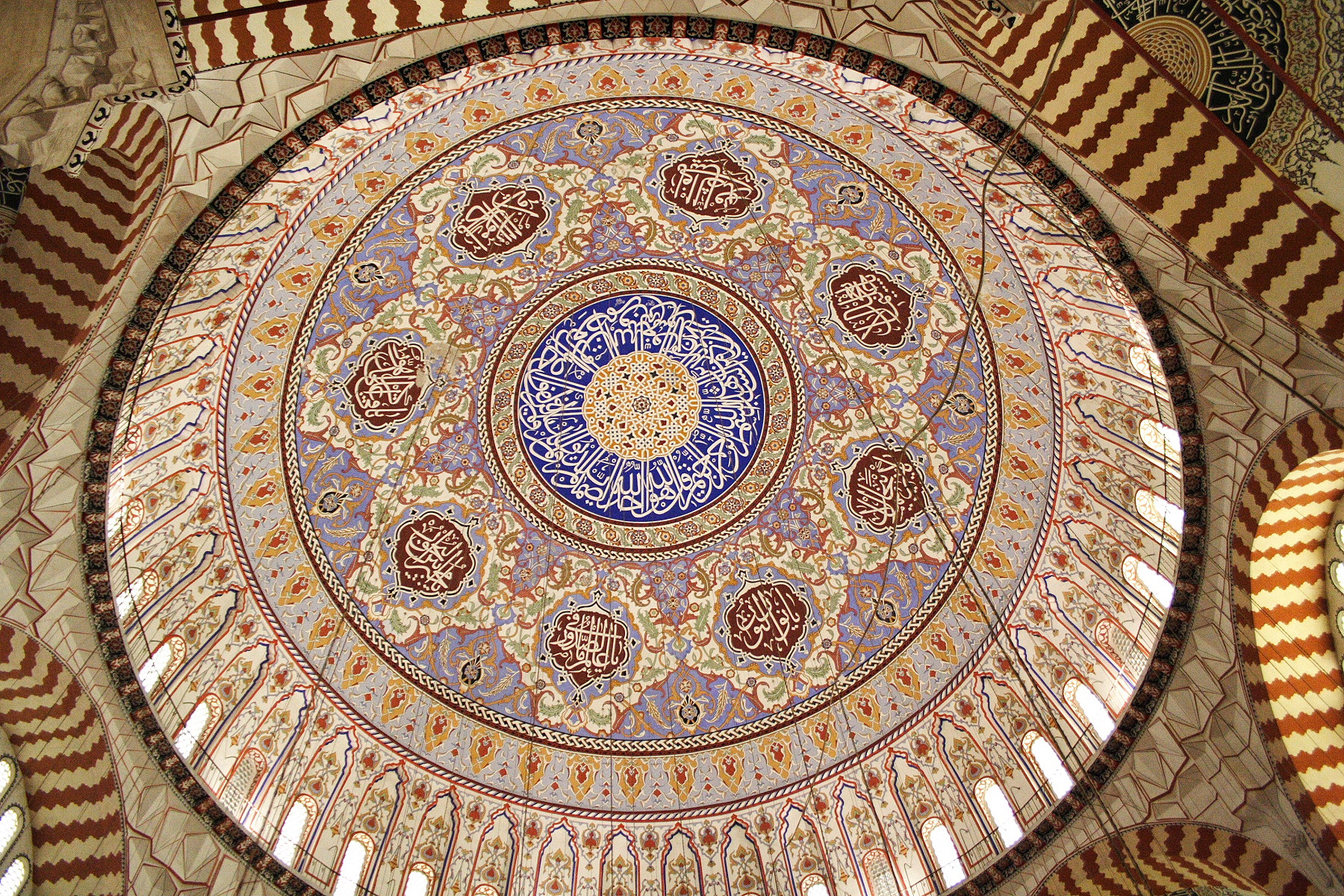
Interior decoration of the dome of Selimiye Mosque, Edirne

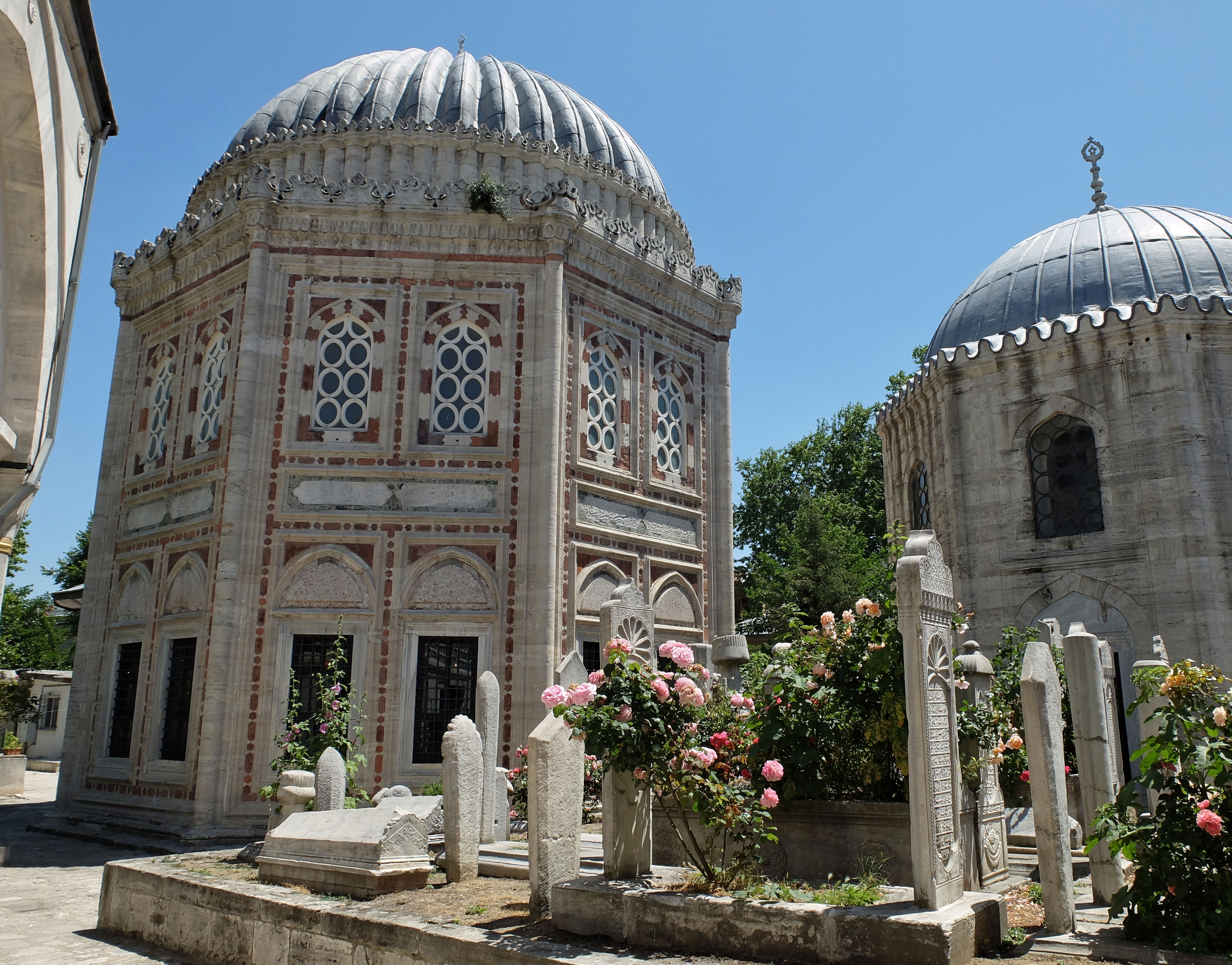
Exterior of Şehzade Mehmed tomb (türbe) in the cemetery of Şehzade Mosque

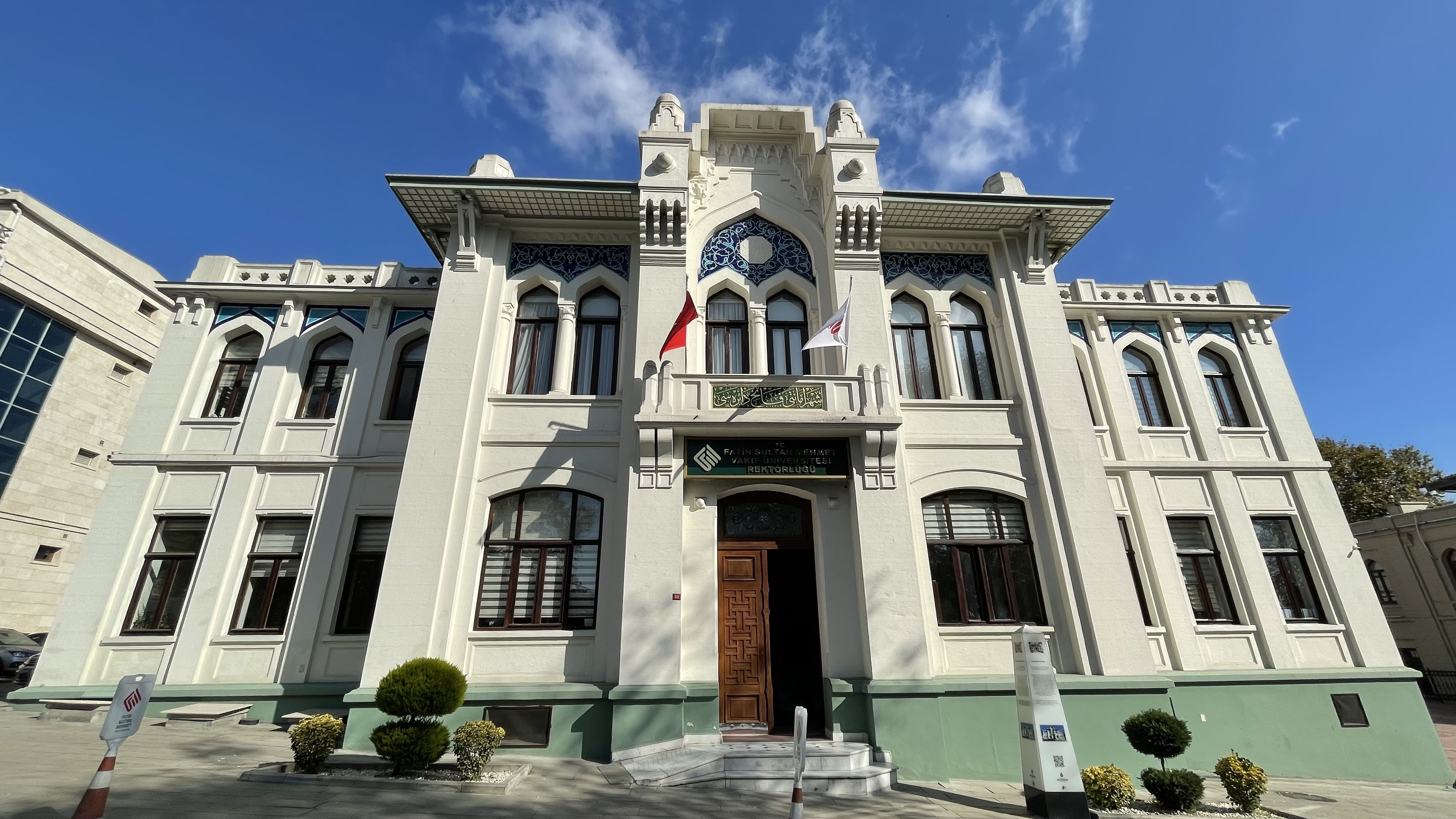
Old Fatih Municipality Building

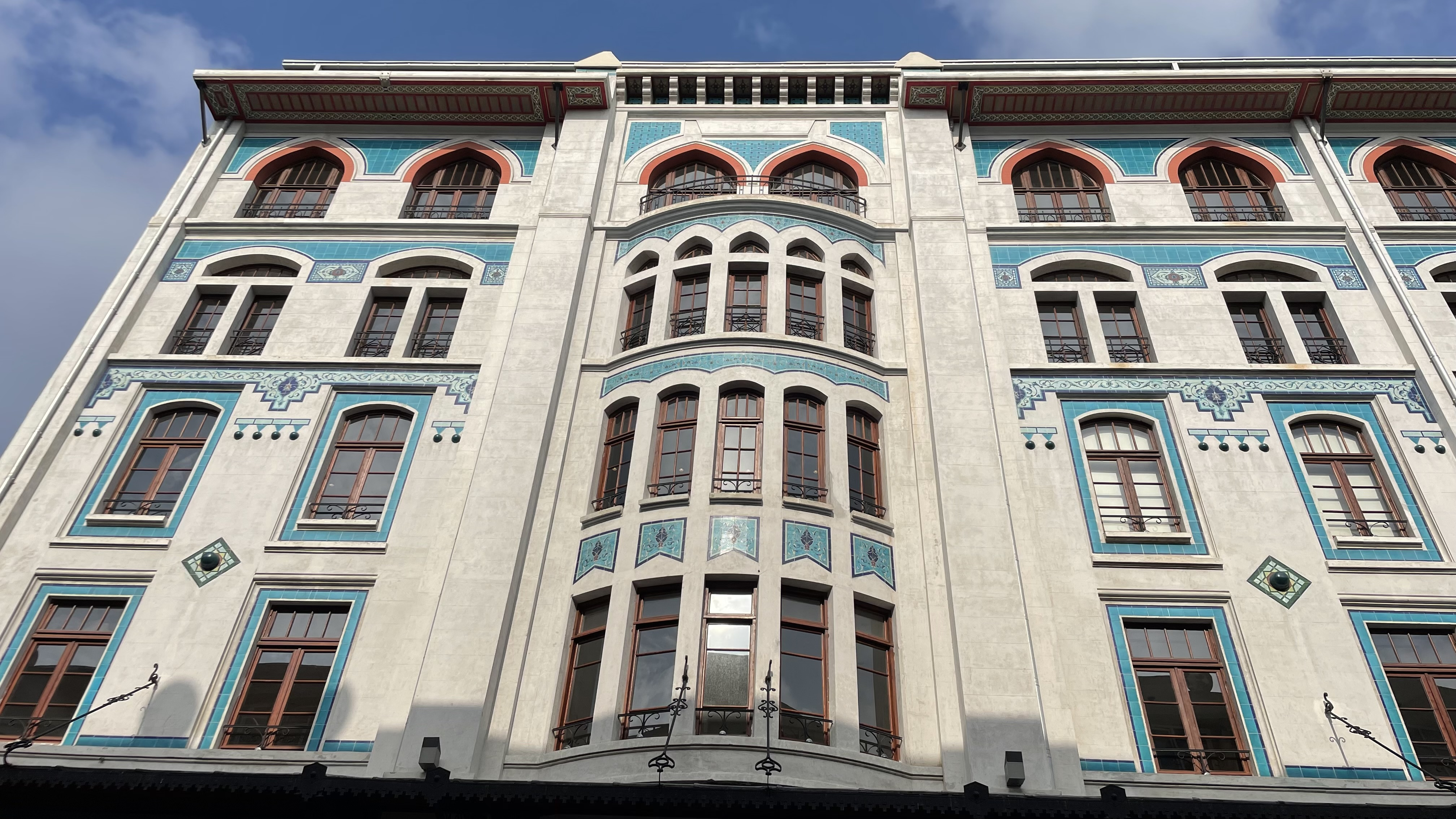
Liman Han (inn)

=== Calligraphy ===
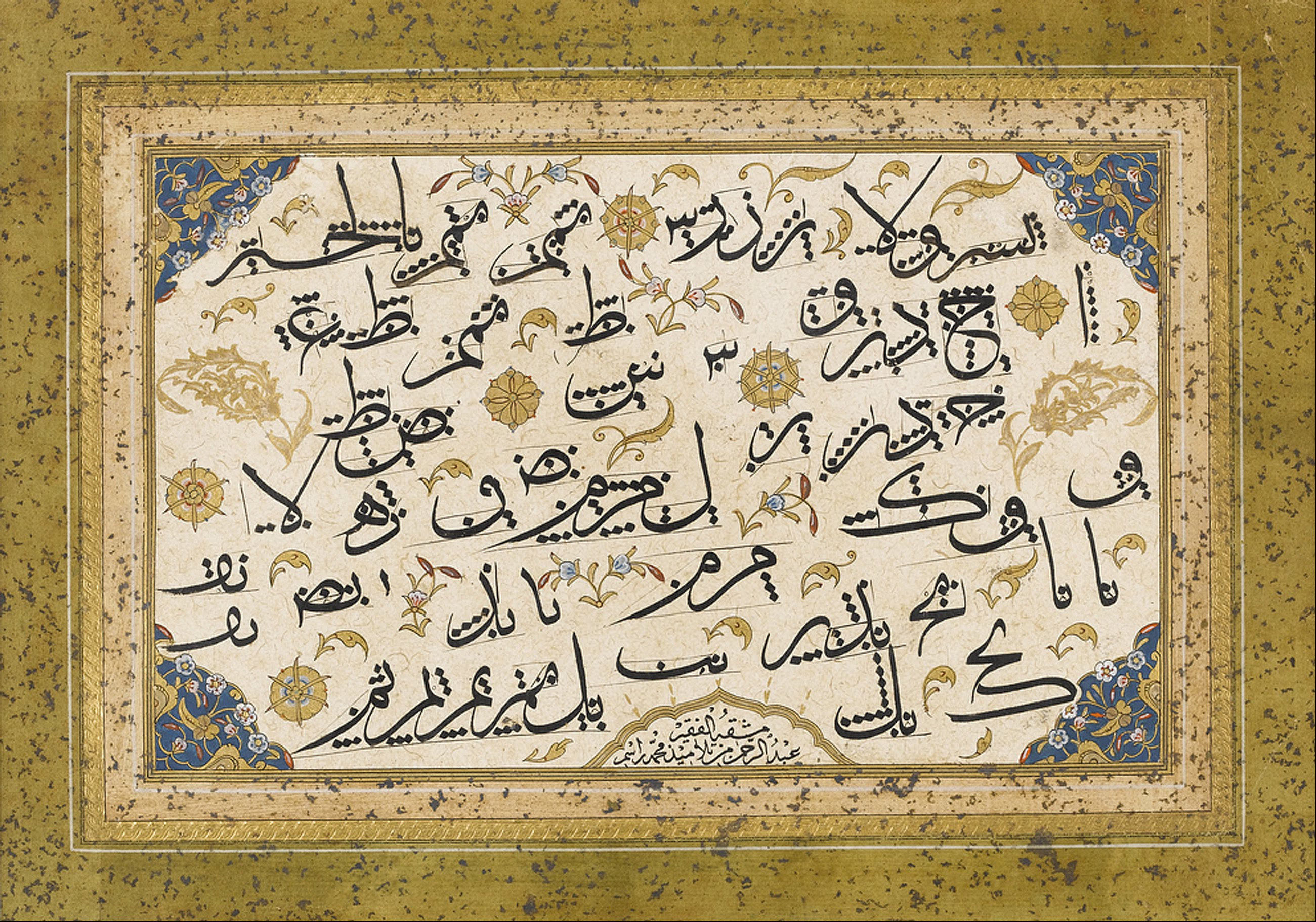
Sample training of Abdul Rahman Hilmi, ink, colours and gold on paper

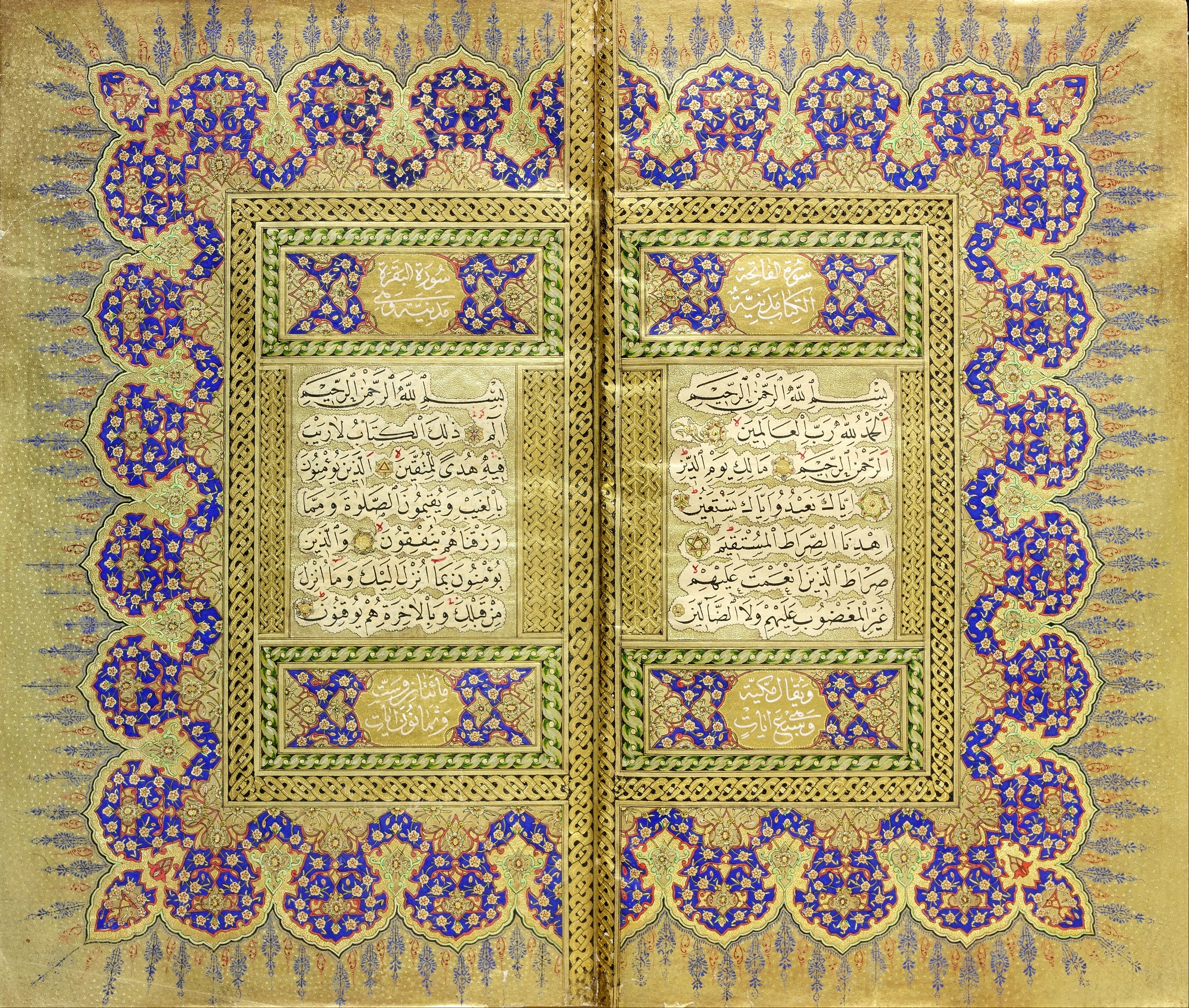
Gold illuminated two opening chapters of the Quran by Mehmed Şevki Efendi

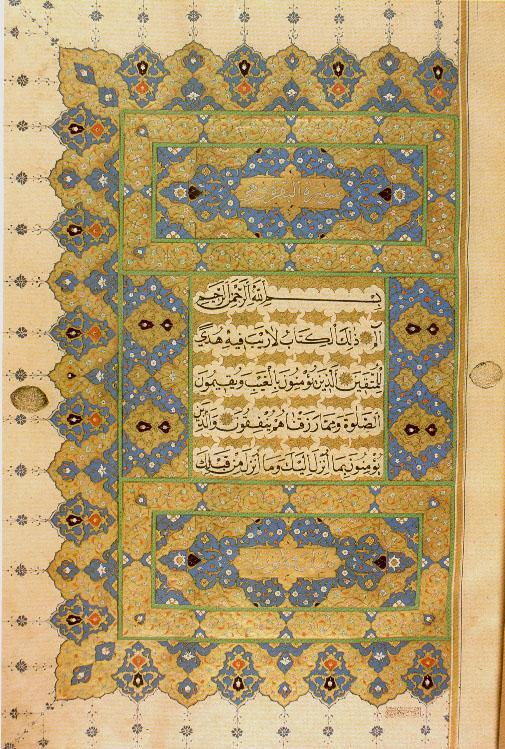
Illuminated first page of Sura al-Baqara by calligrapher Ahmet Karahisari

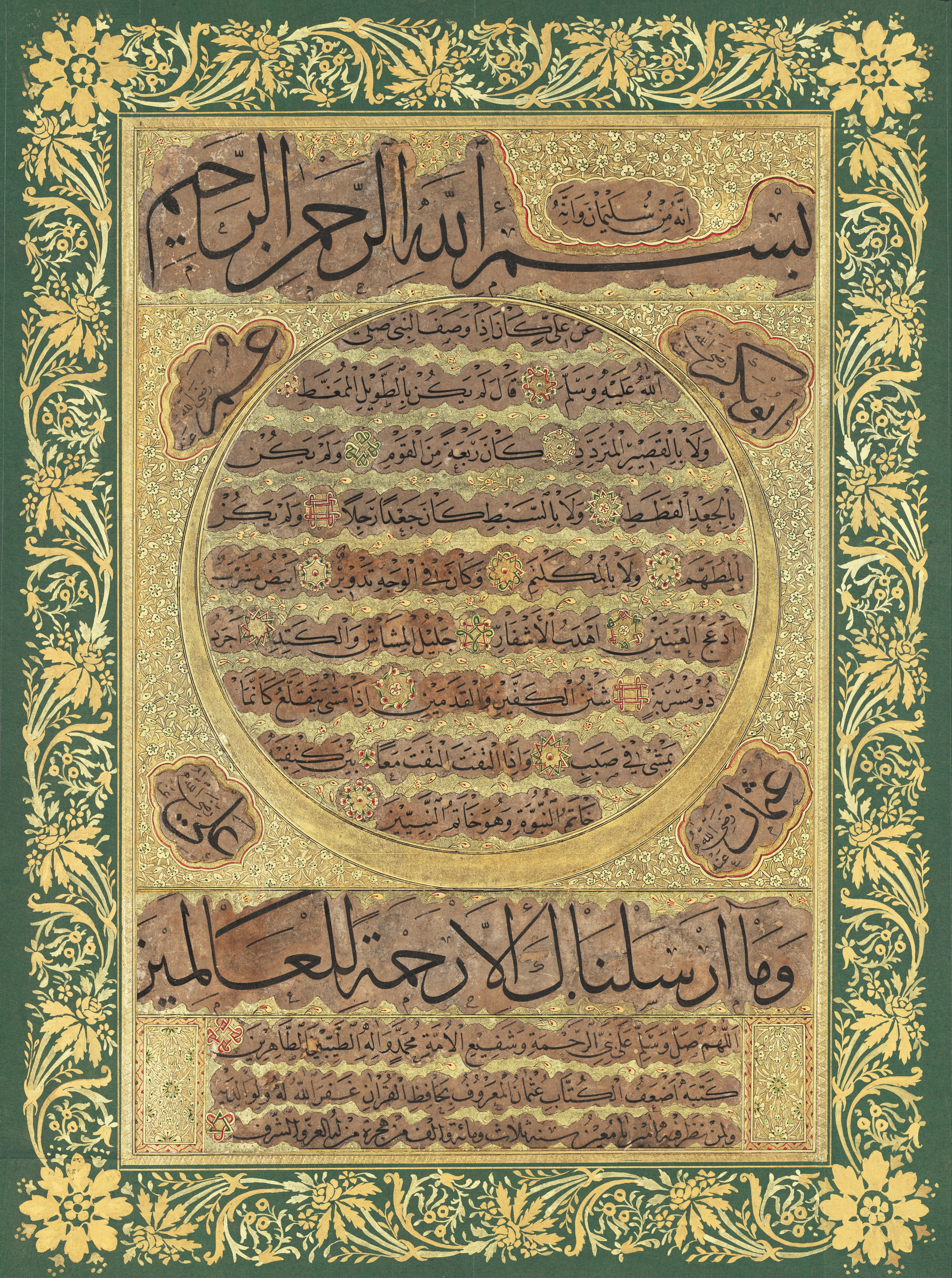
Description of the Prophet Muhammad by calligrapher Hafız Osman (1642–1698)

A step by step animation of the tughra of Sultan Mahmud II

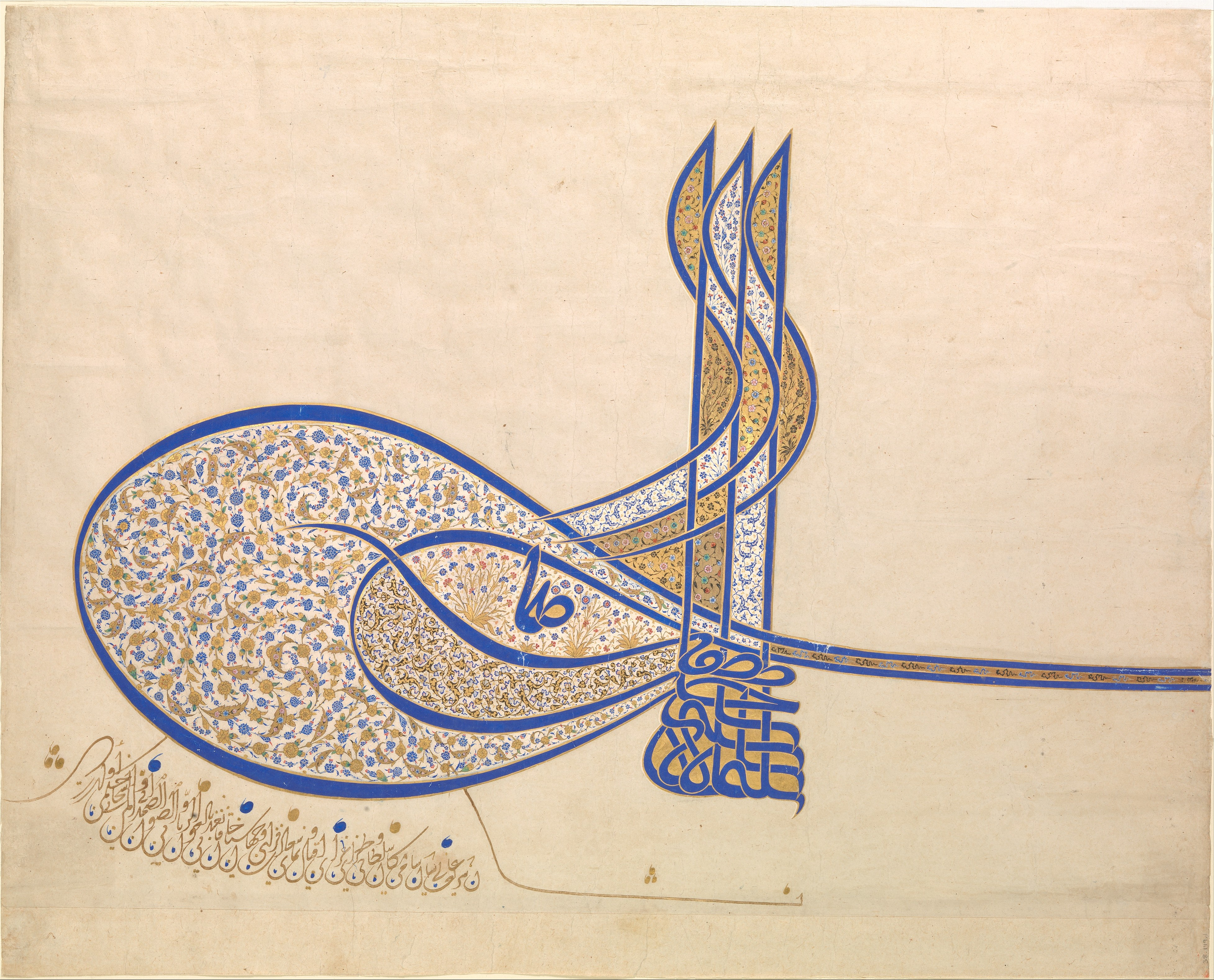
Decorated tughra of Suleyman the Magnificent (1520)

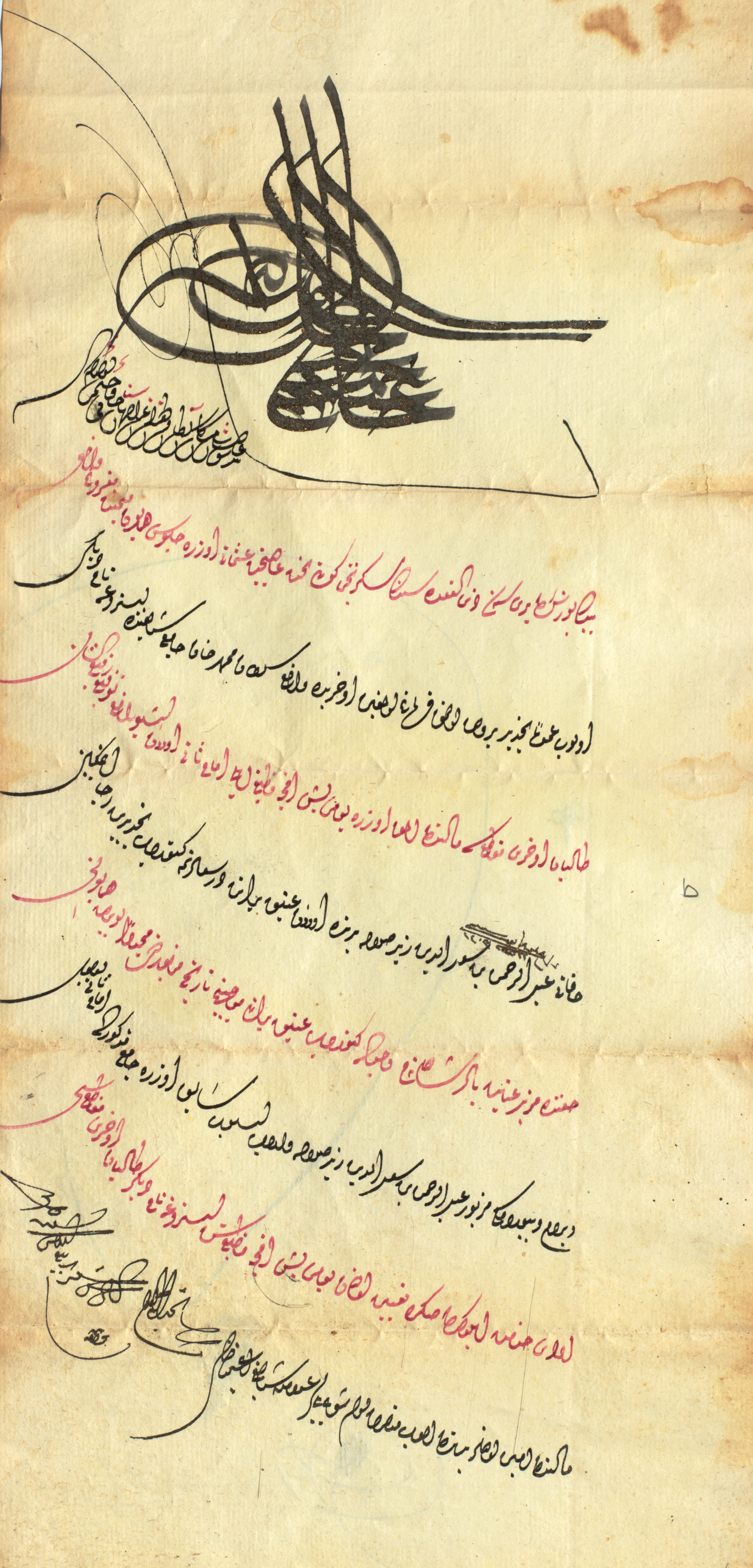
A decree with royal tughra on top for appointing second imam in the Mehmed Sultan Mosque in Ohrid, Republic of Macedonia

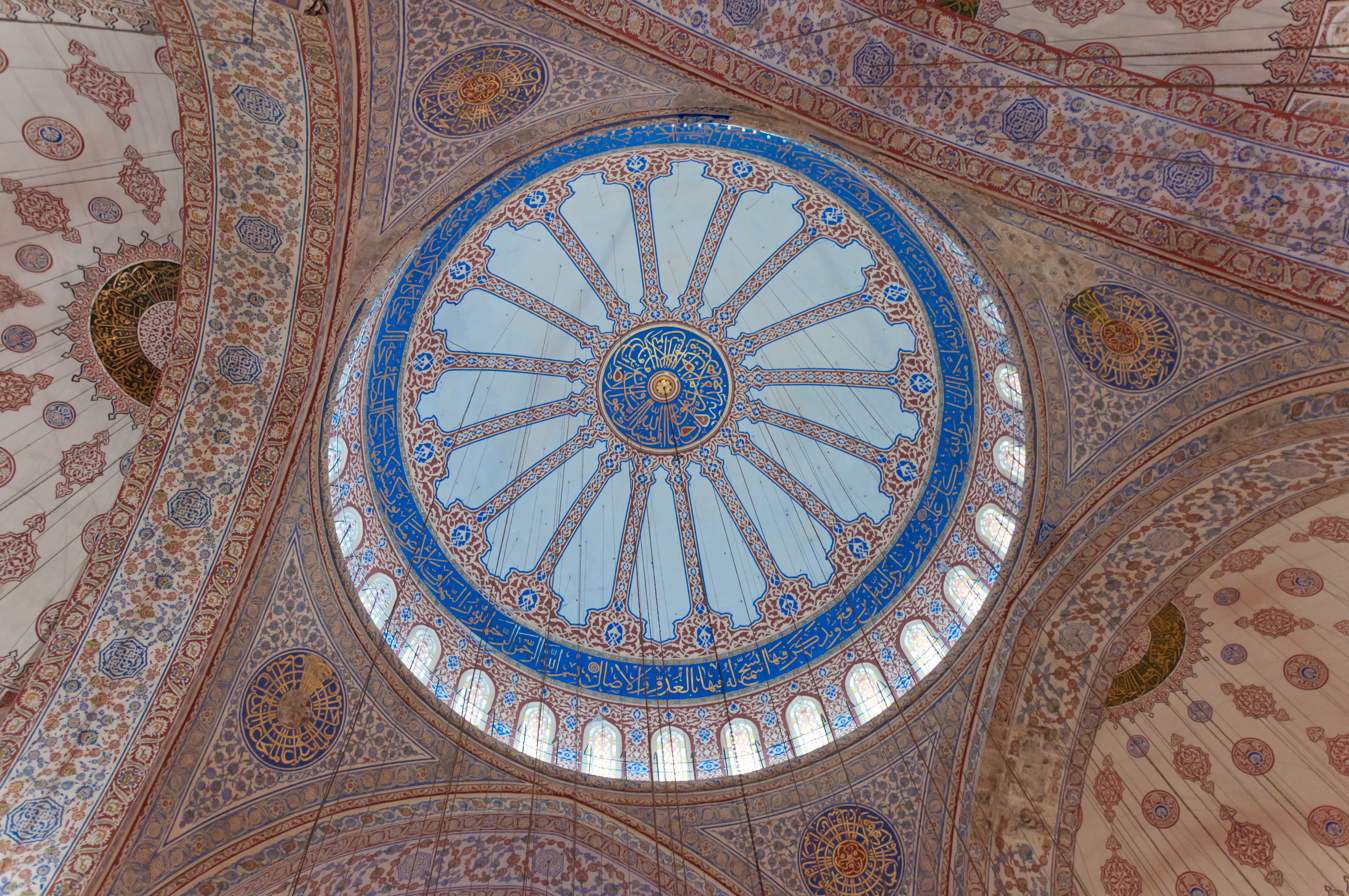
Main dome of the Blue Mosque with calligraphy inscriptions

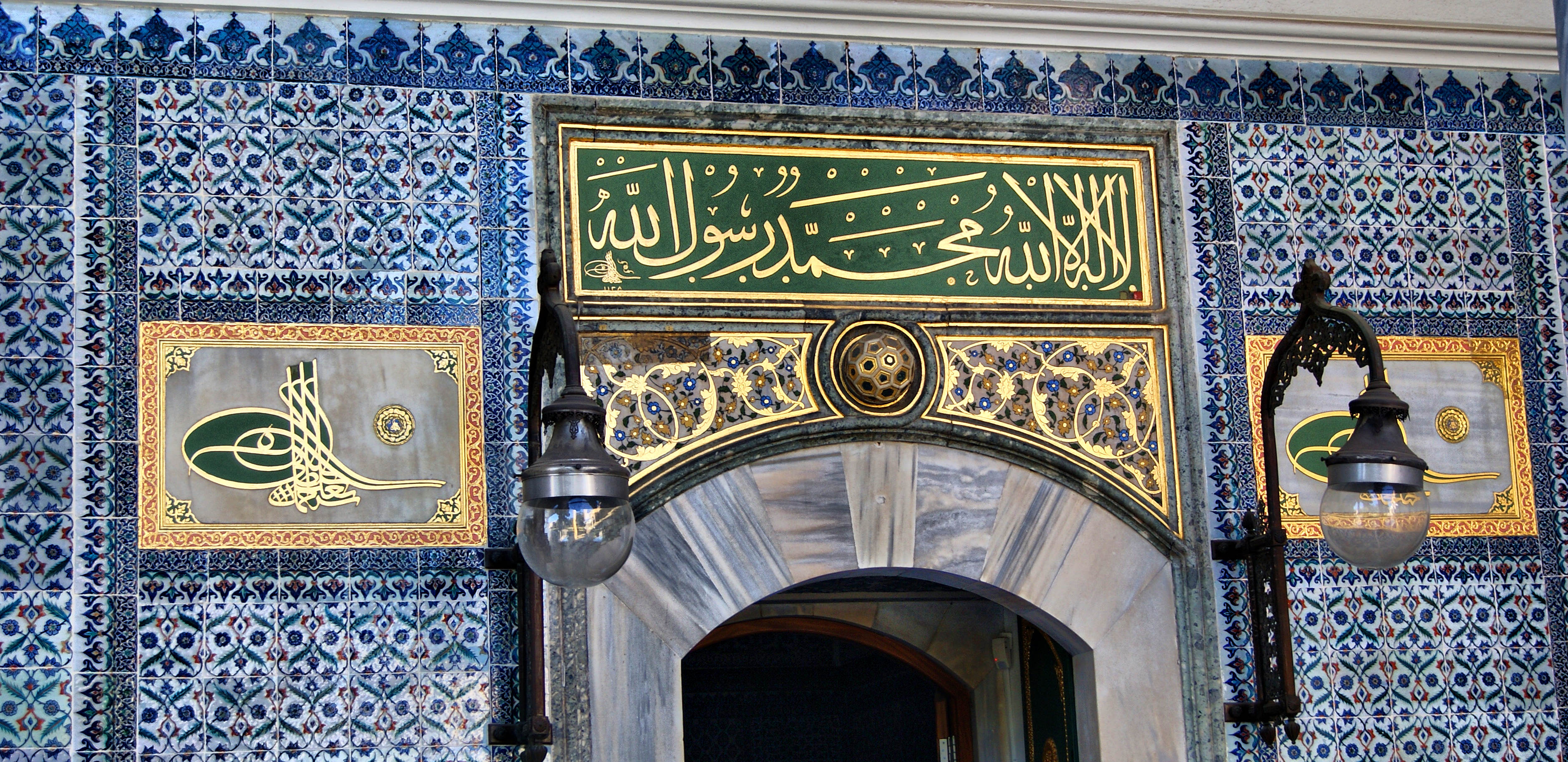
The testimony of faith (top) and tughras (right and left) inscribed on the entrance to a building at Topkapi Palace, Istanbul

=== Carpets ===
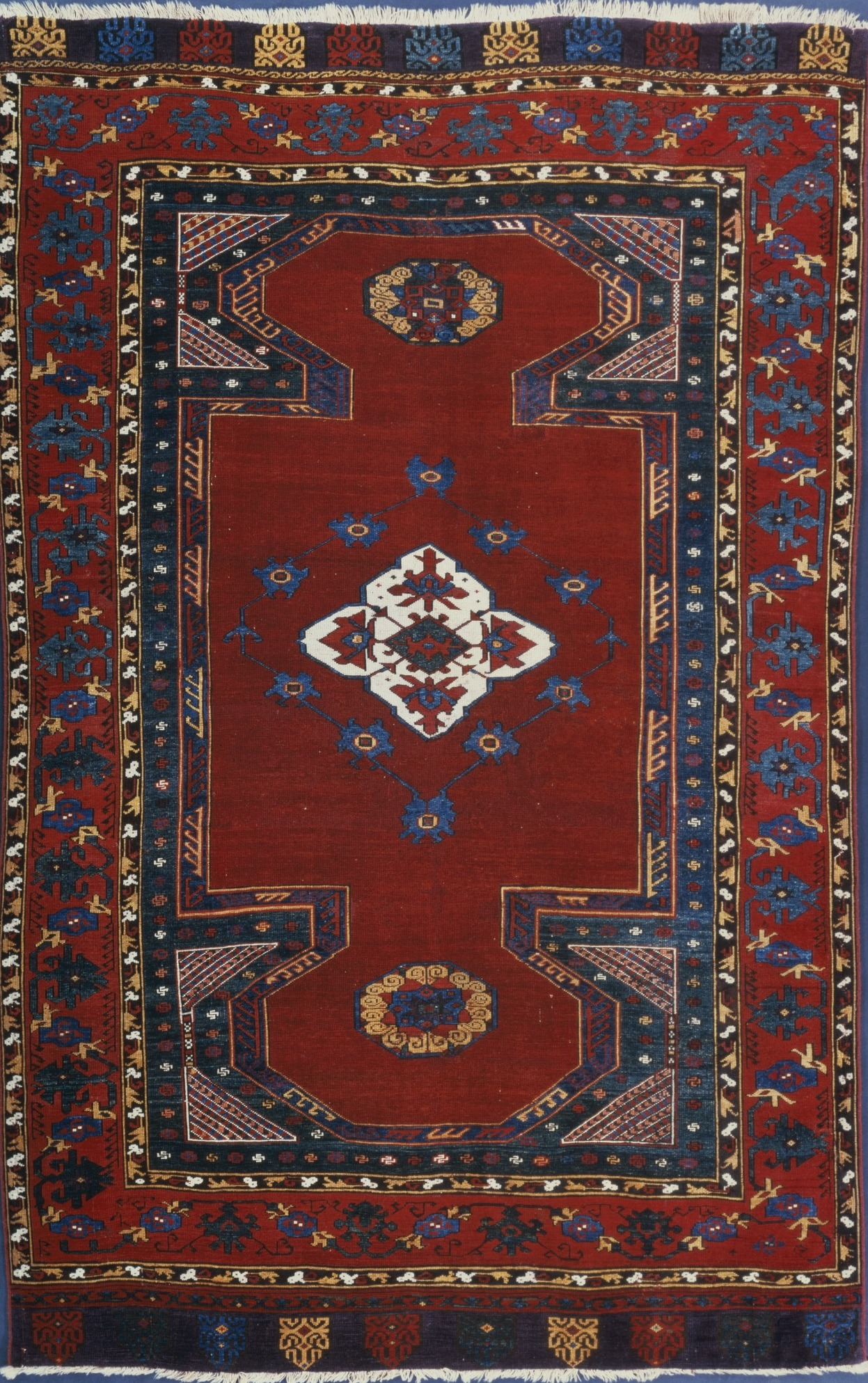
Anatolian double-niche rug, Konya region, circa 1750–1800

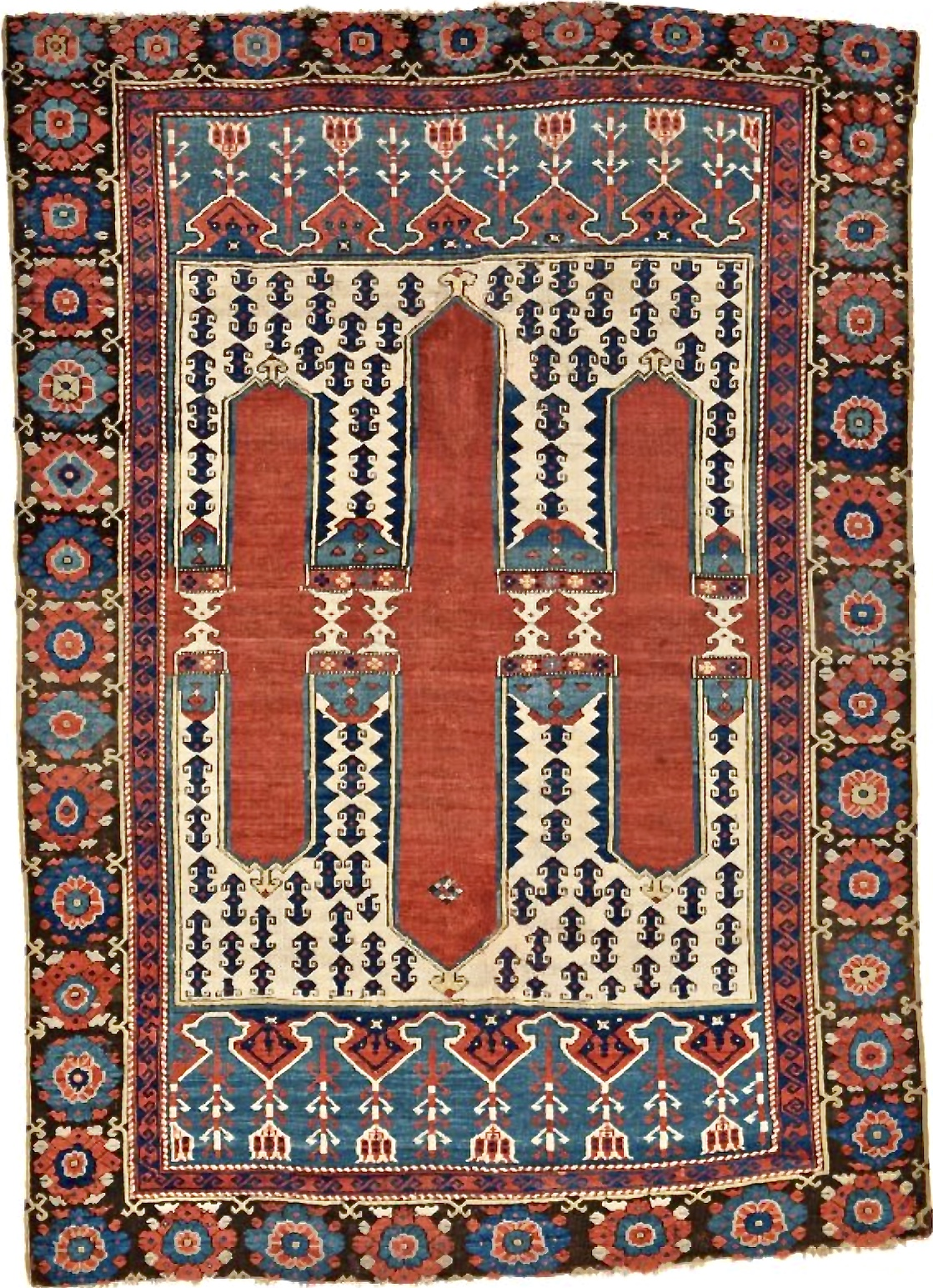
Bergama rug

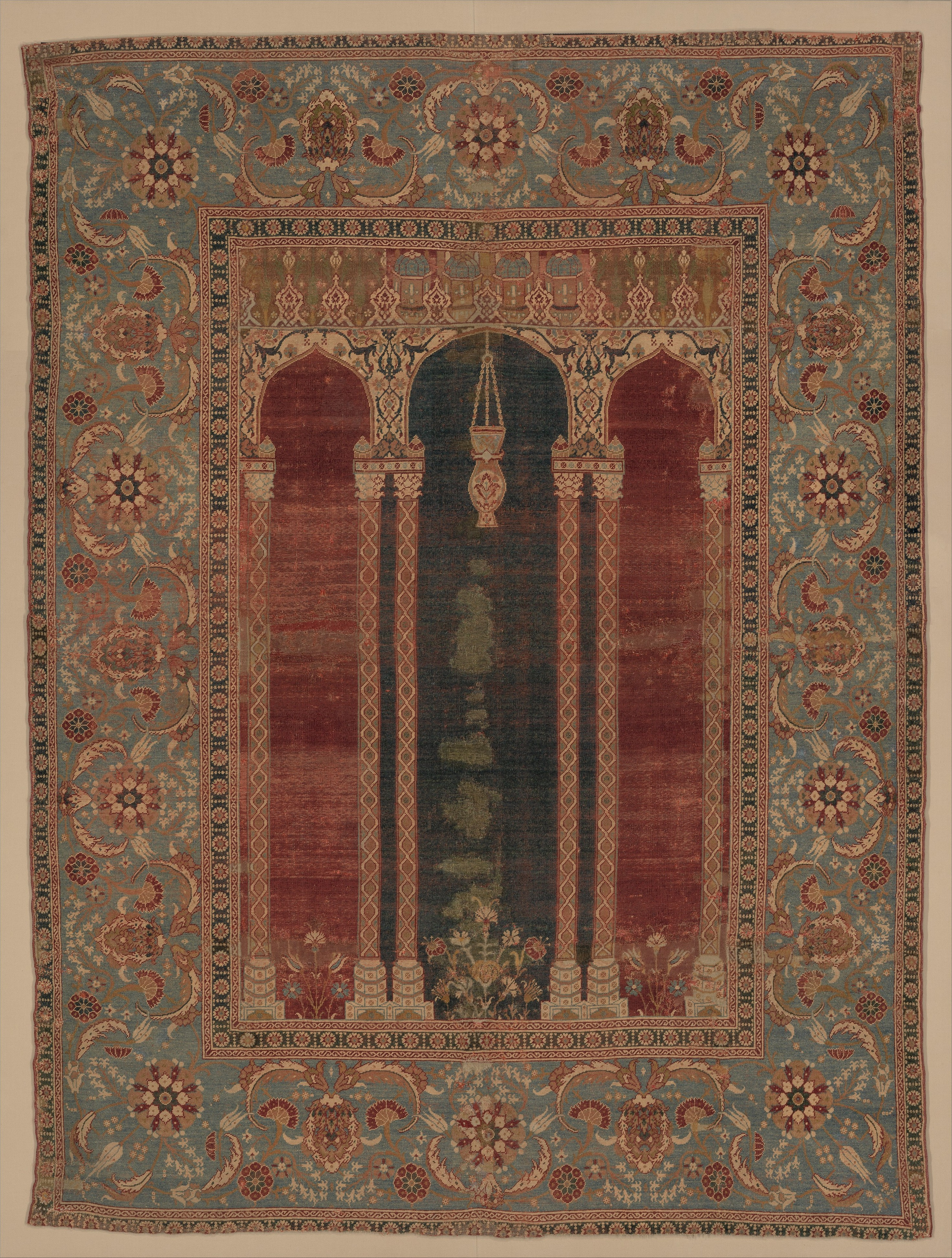

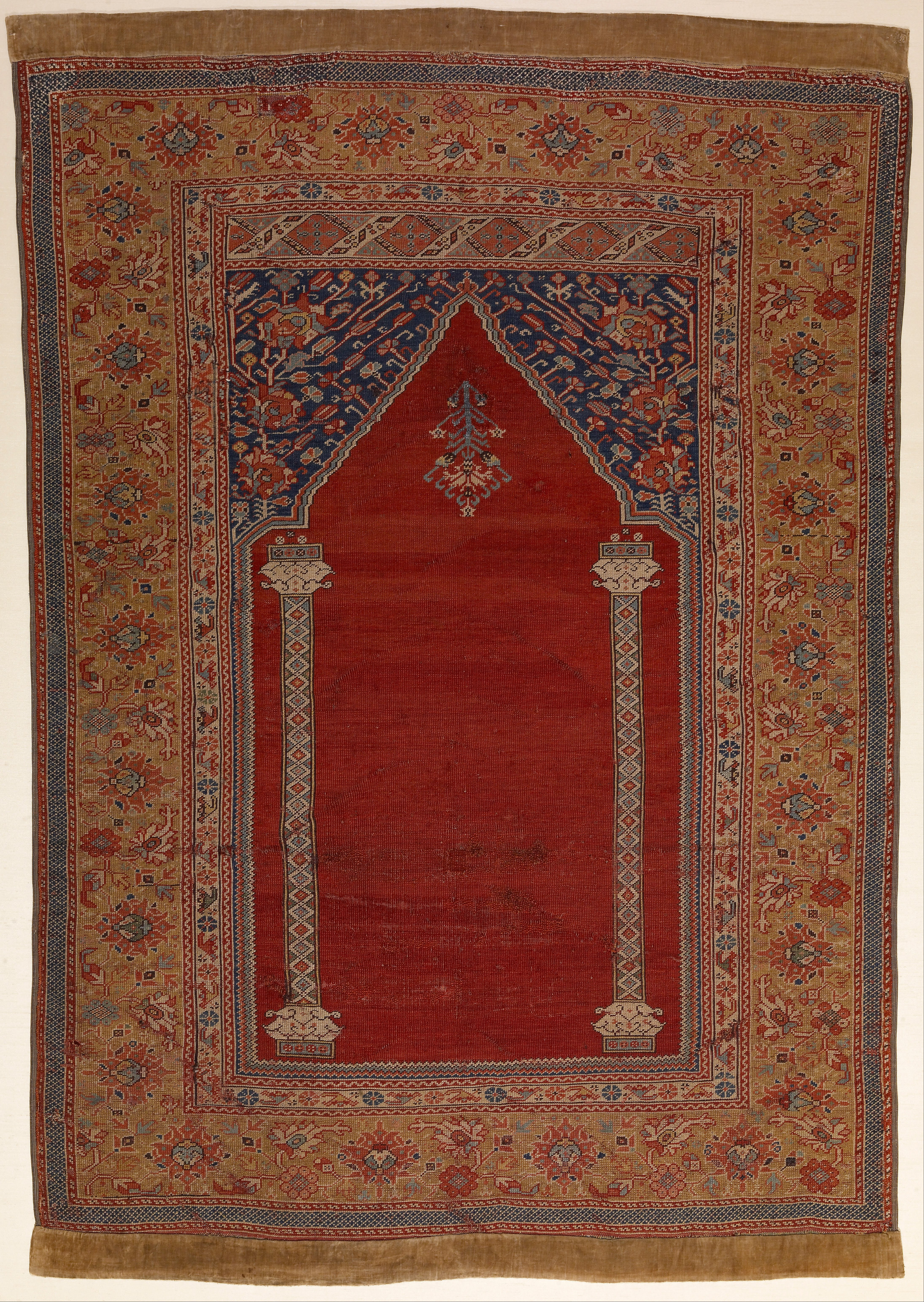

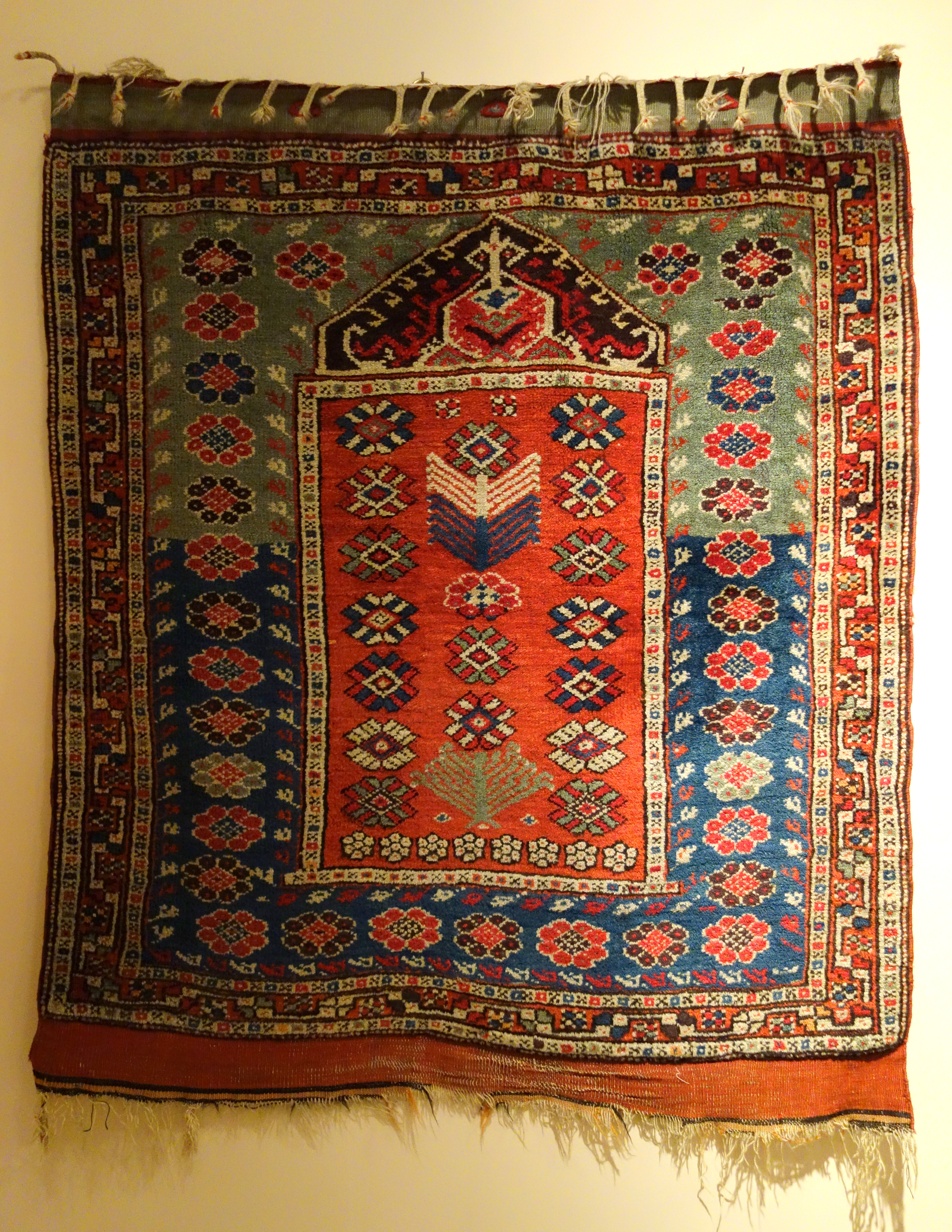

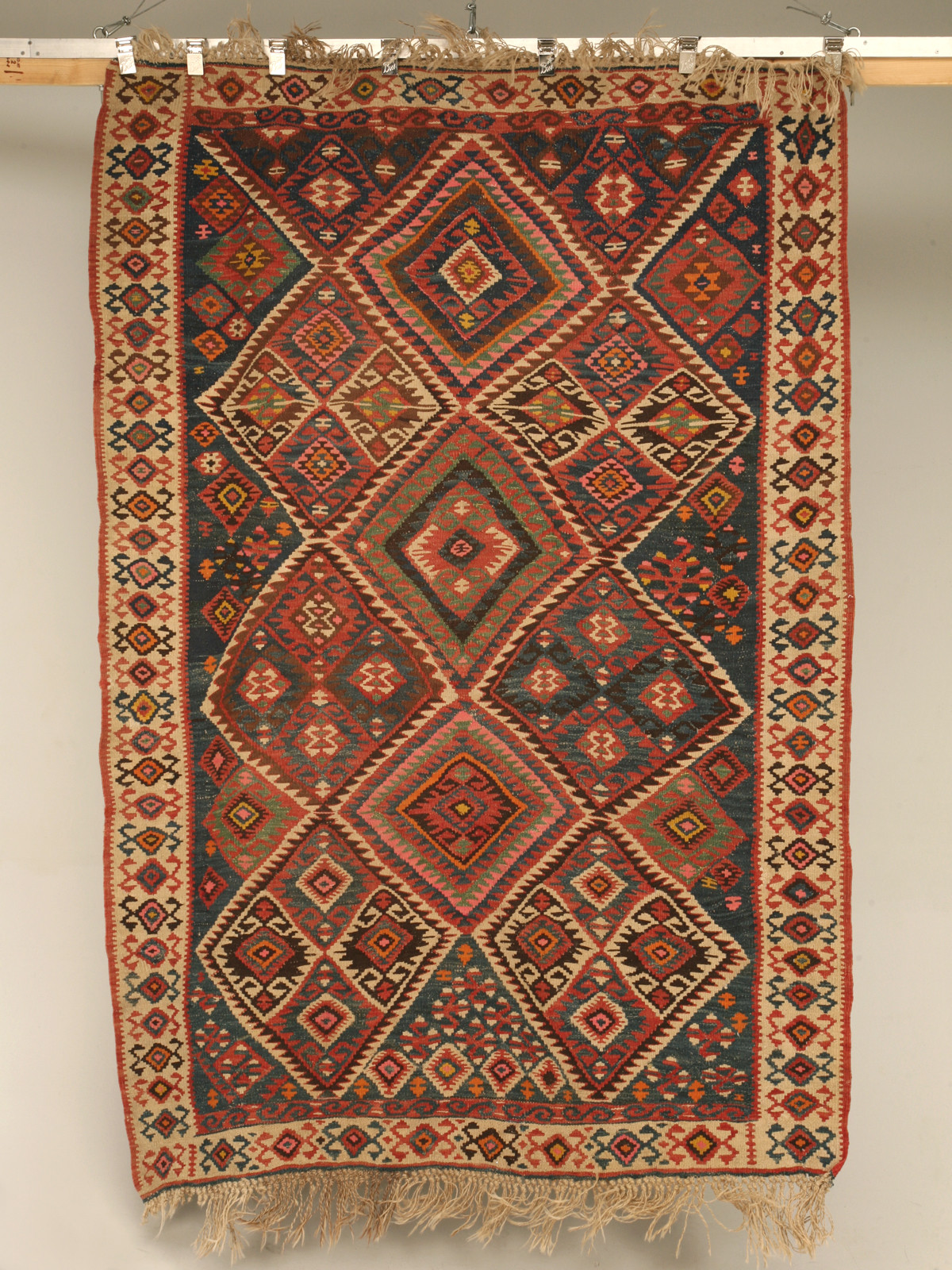

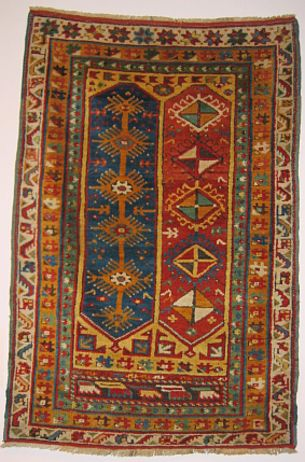

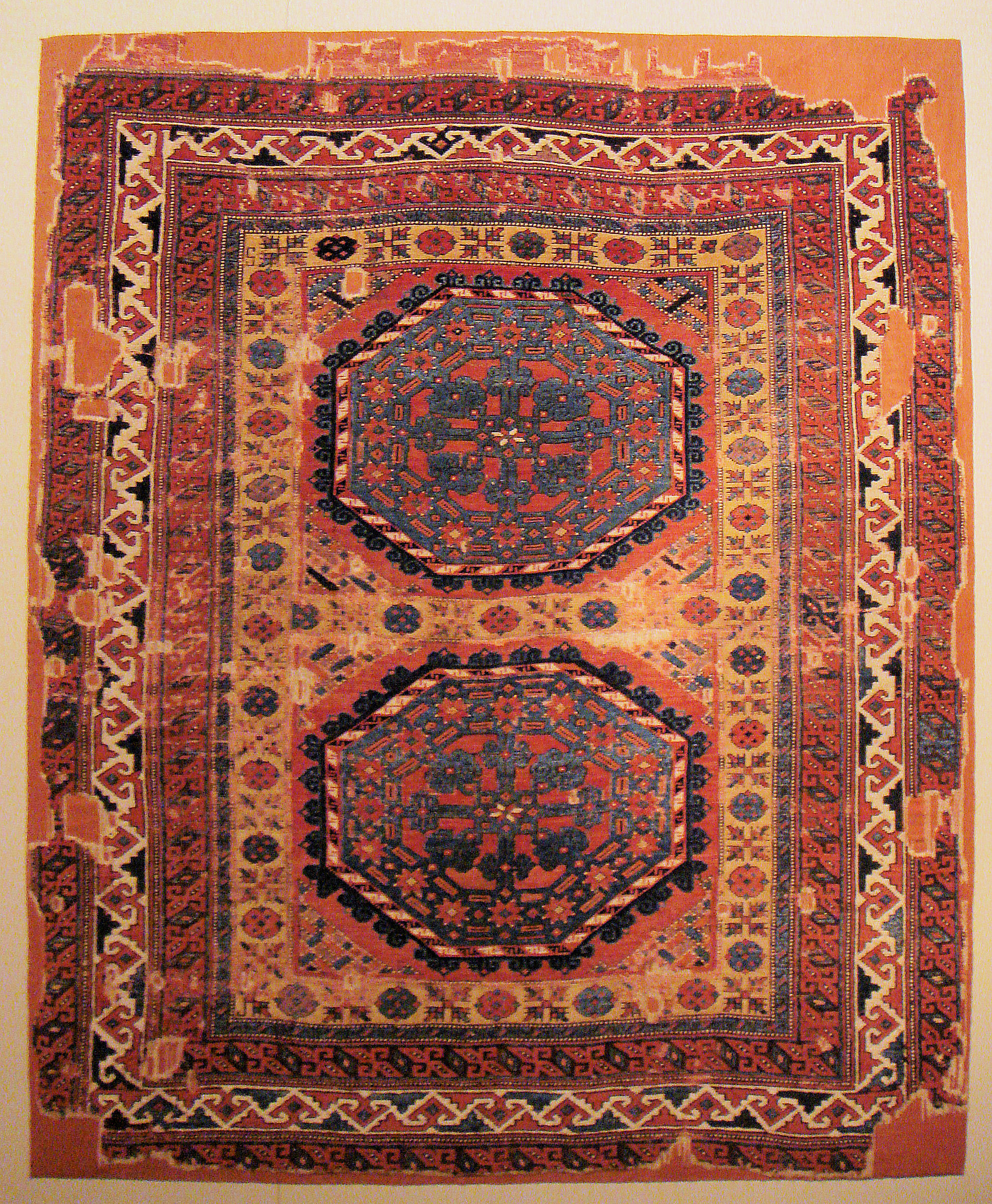

=== Dance ===
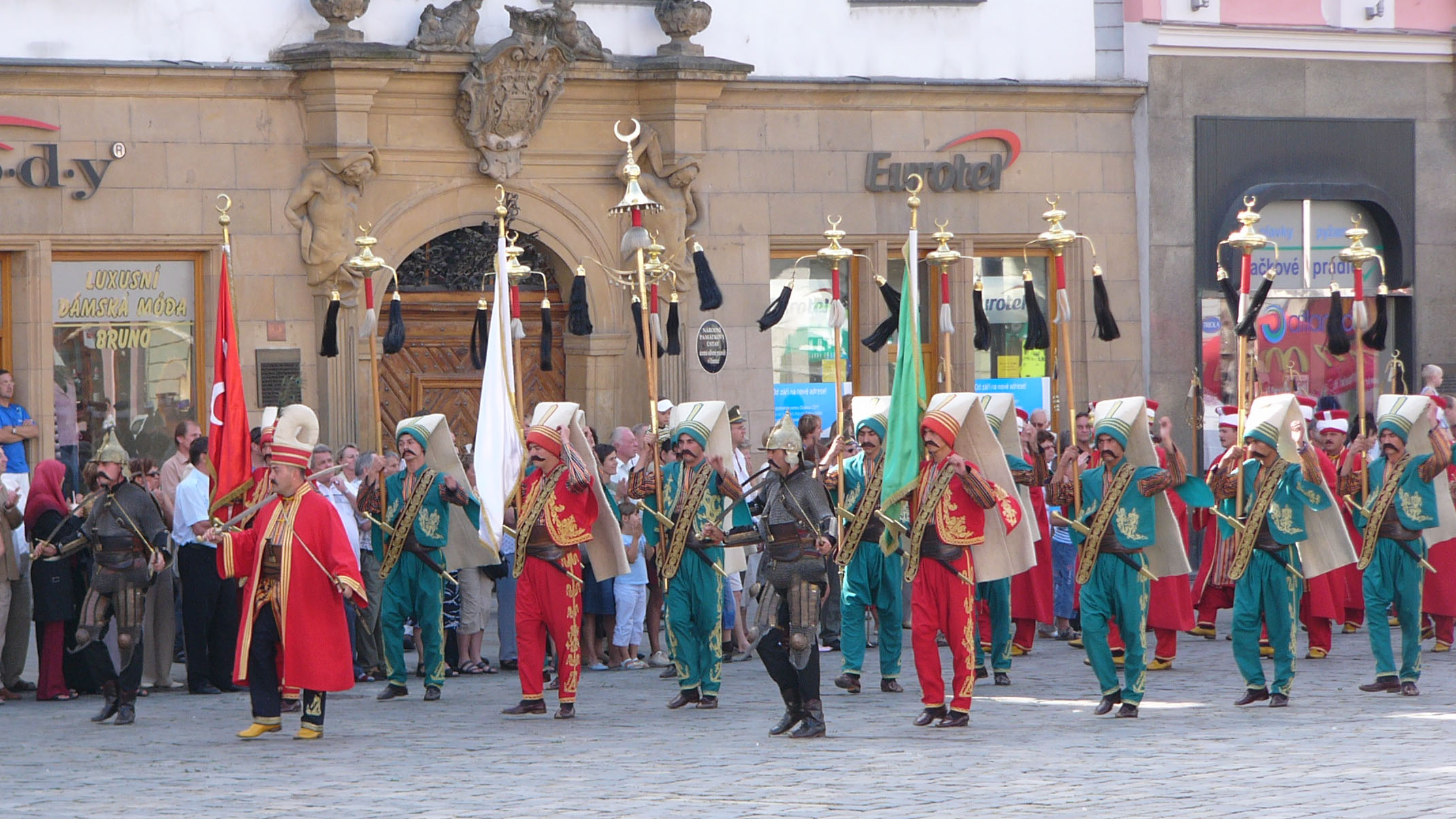
A modern Ottoman military band (mehter) troop

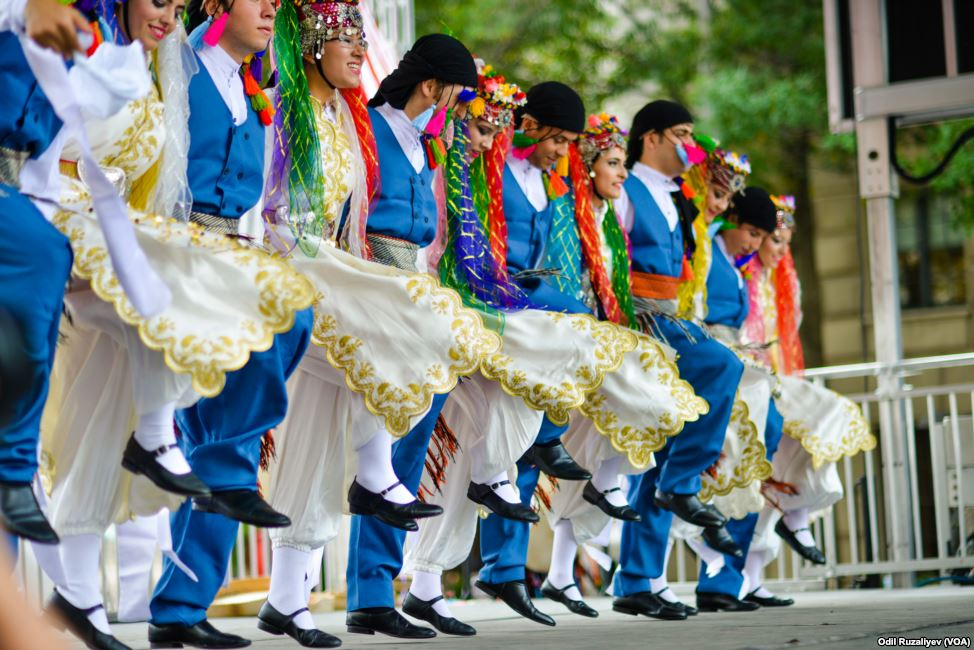
A traditional Turkish folk dance team

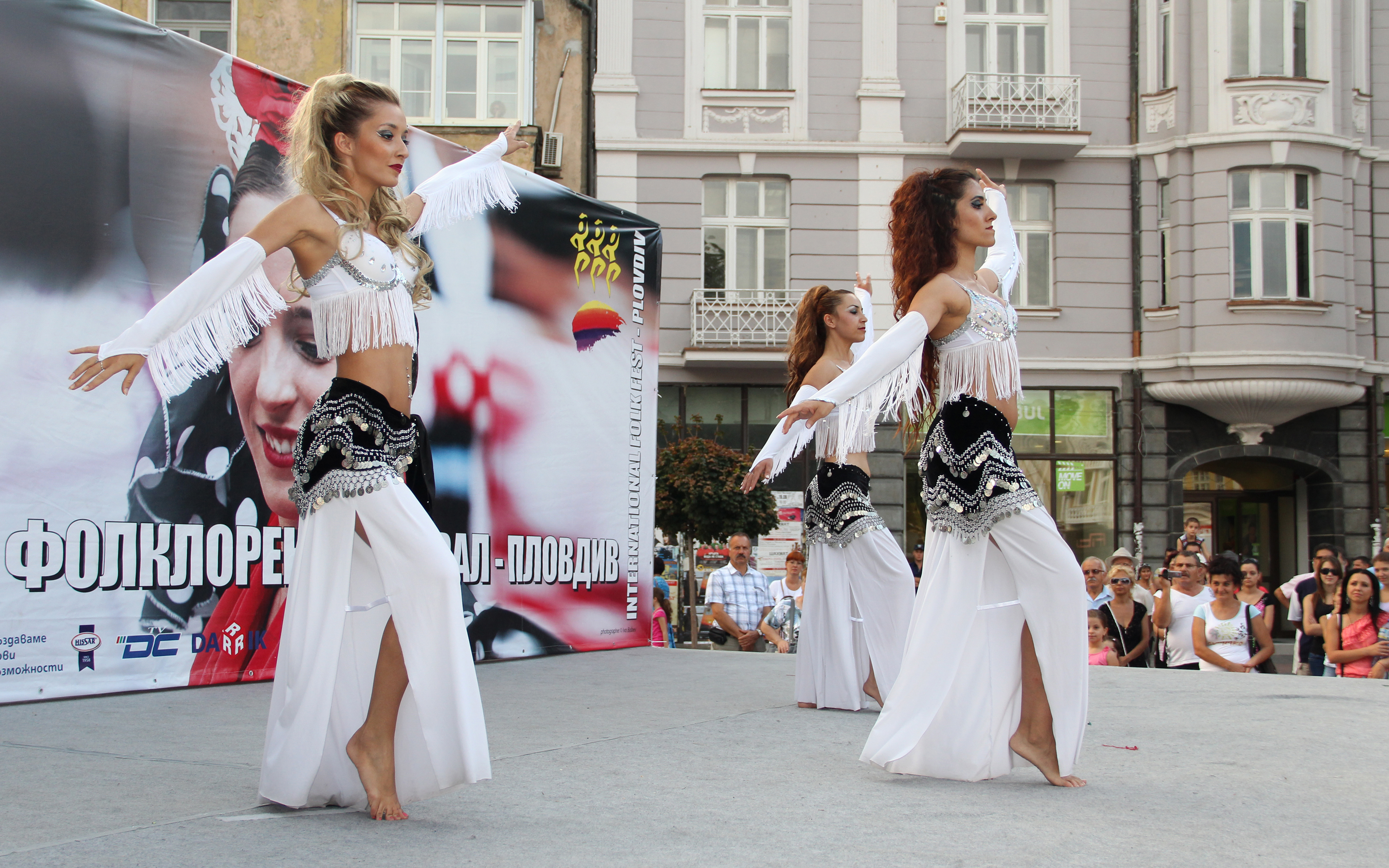
Turkish Belly Dance at the 18th International Folklore Festival, 2012, Plovdiv, Bulgaria

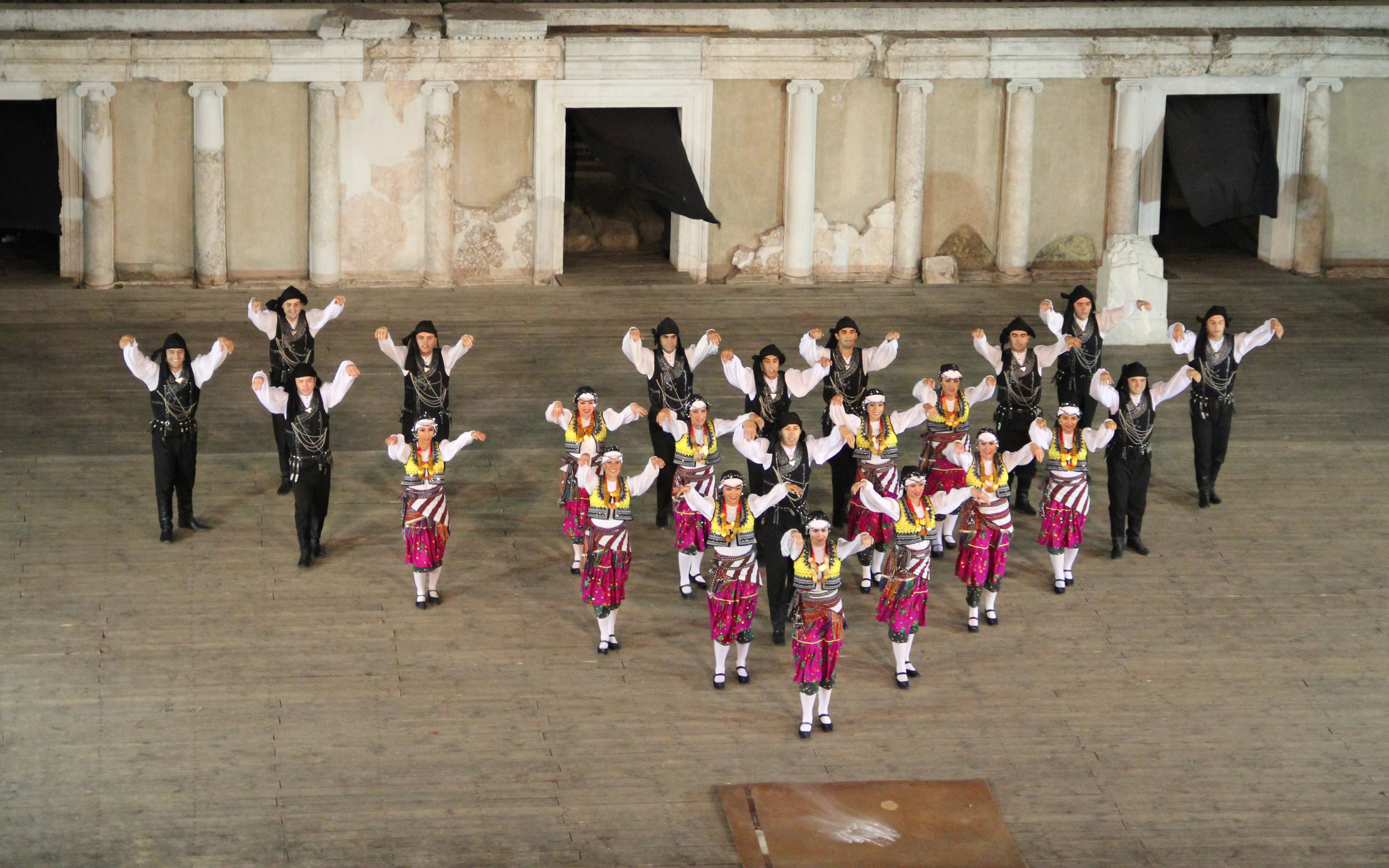
A children's folk dance team from the Black Sea region

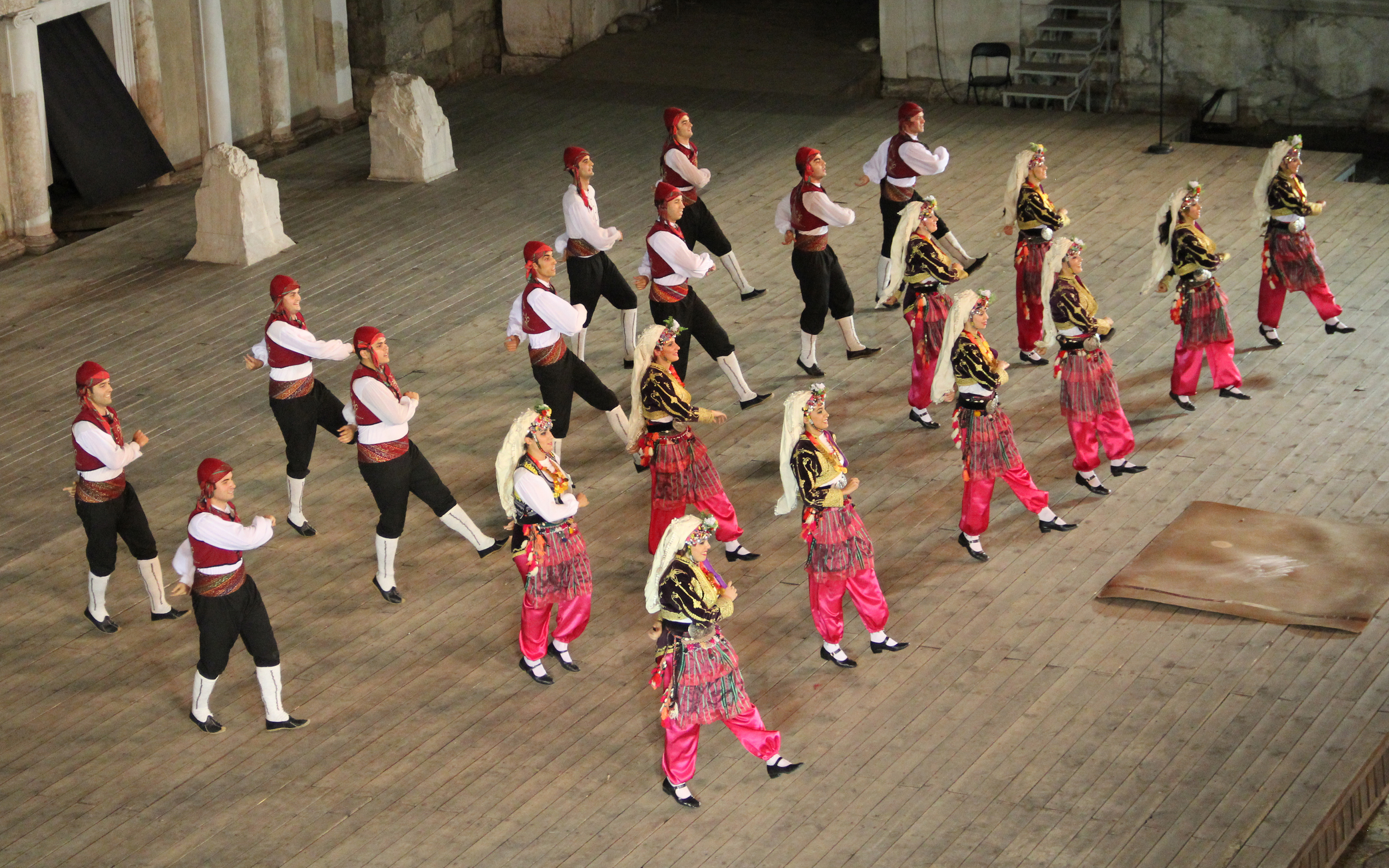
Turkish dance group

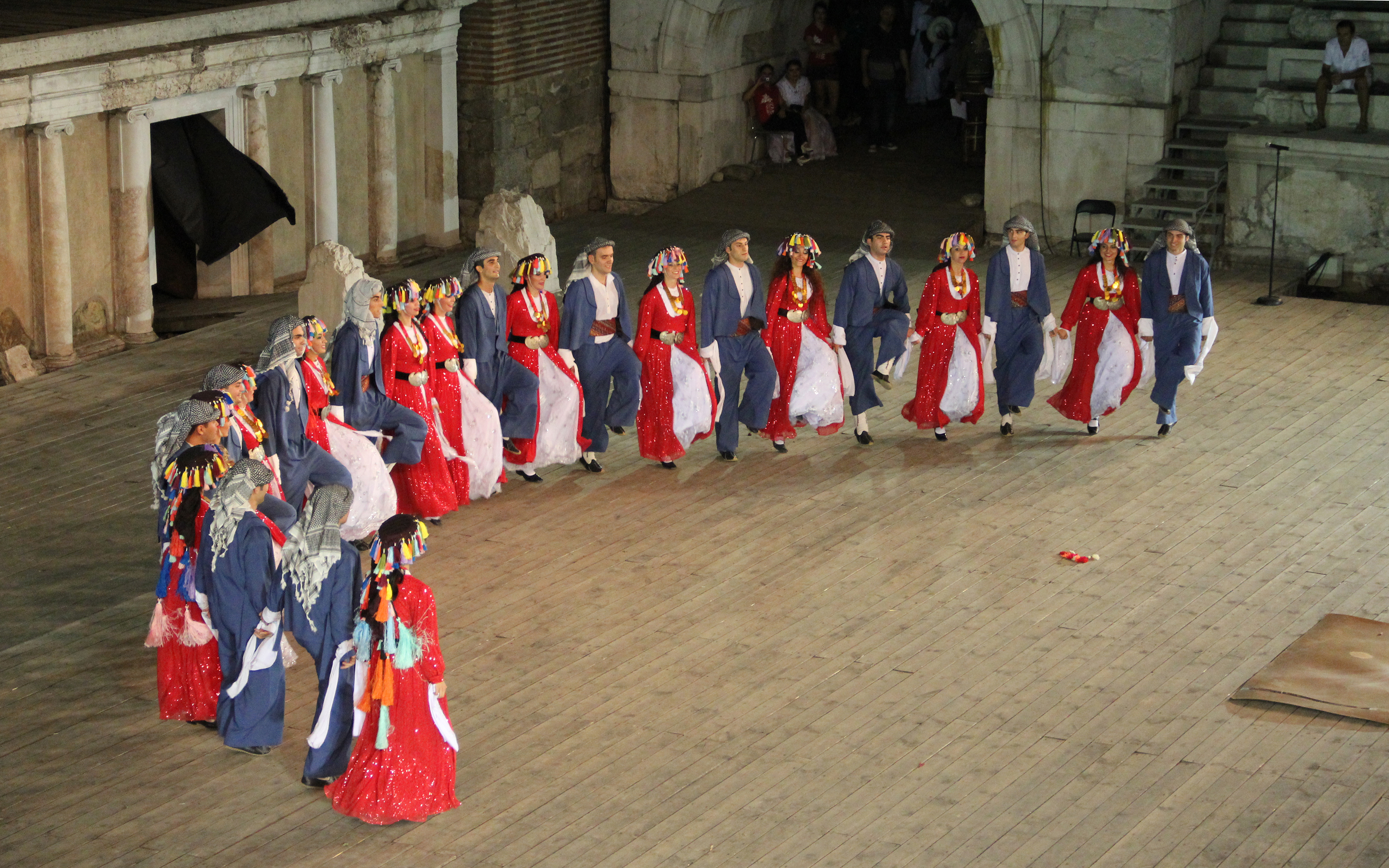
Turkish dance group

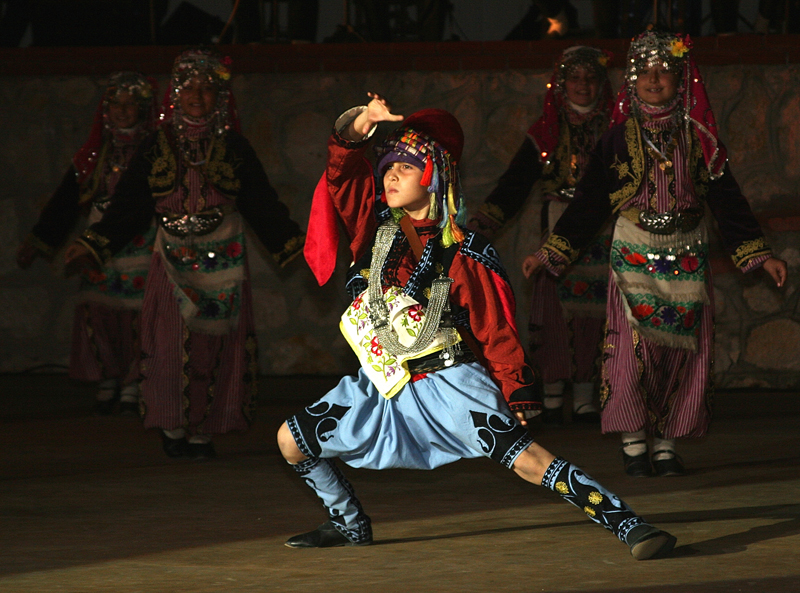
Zeybek Dancer

=== Fashion ===
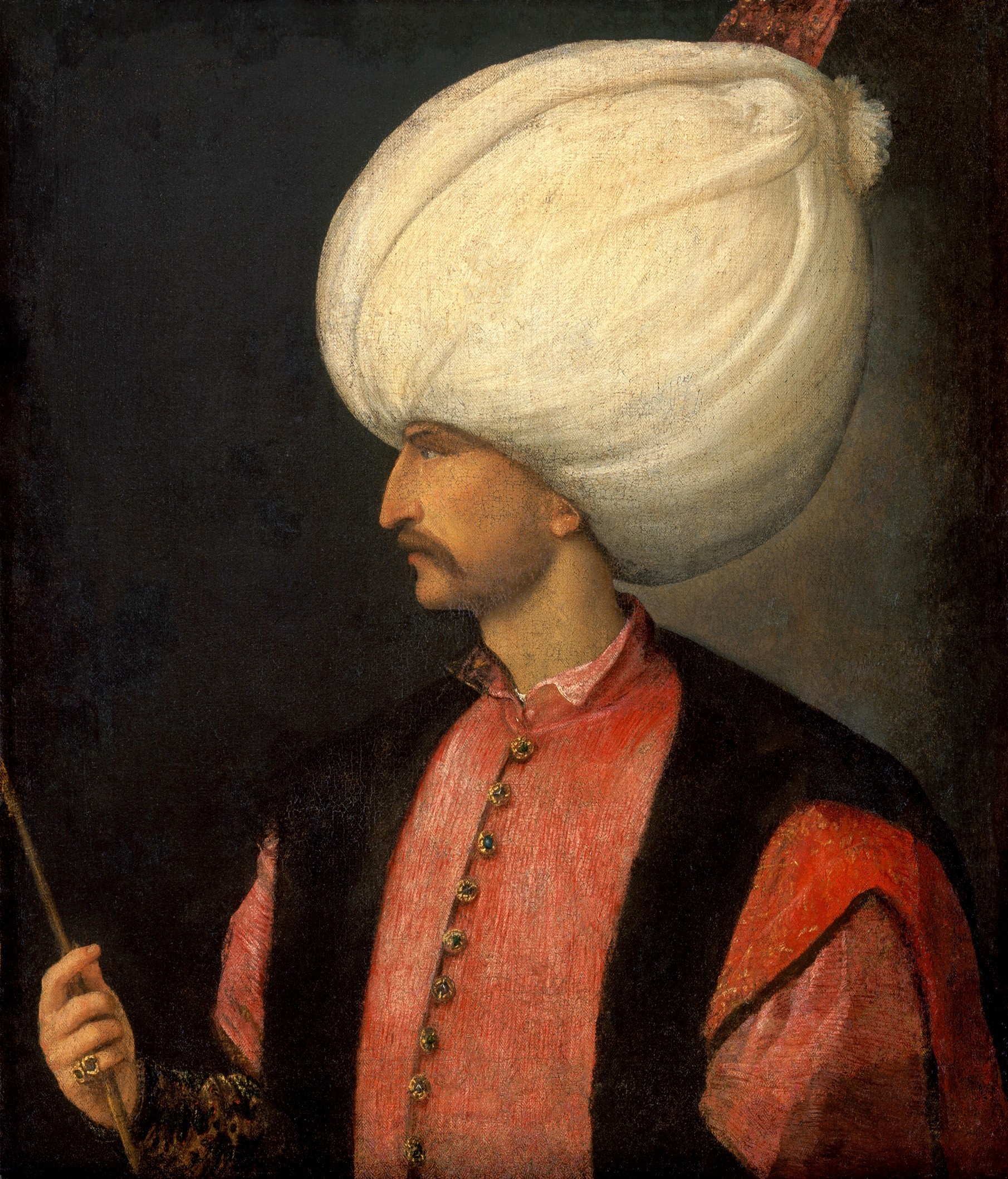
Emperor Suleiman

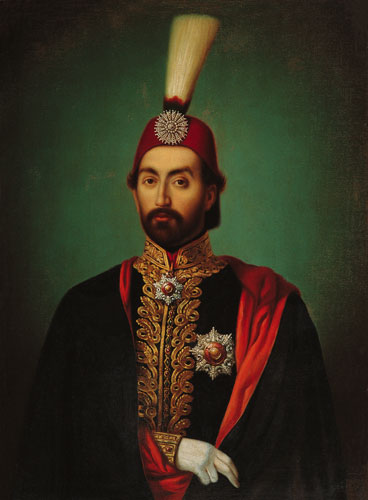
Sultan Abdul Majid, Pera Museum

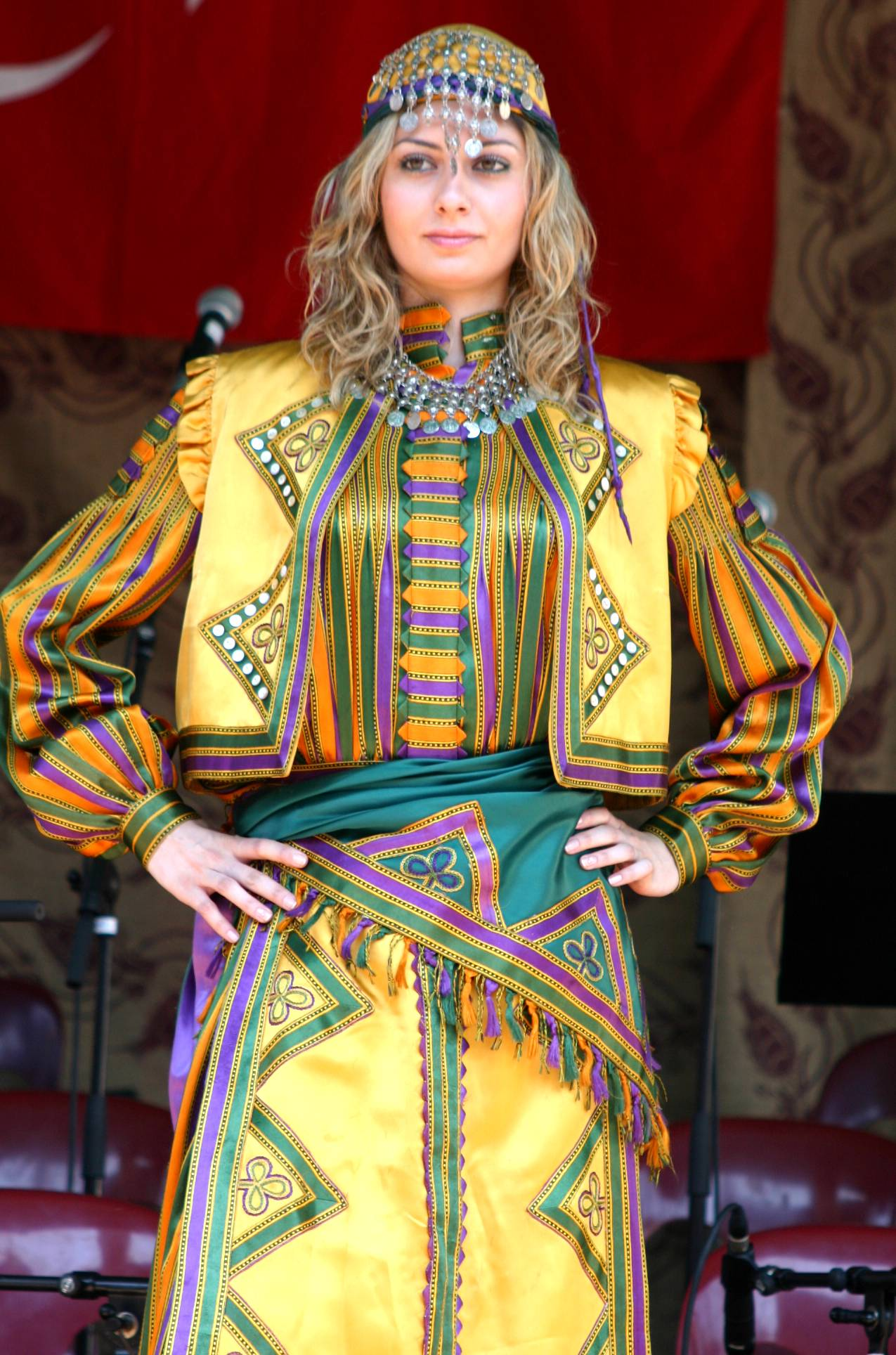
Turkish model at a fashion show, Brussels, Belgium

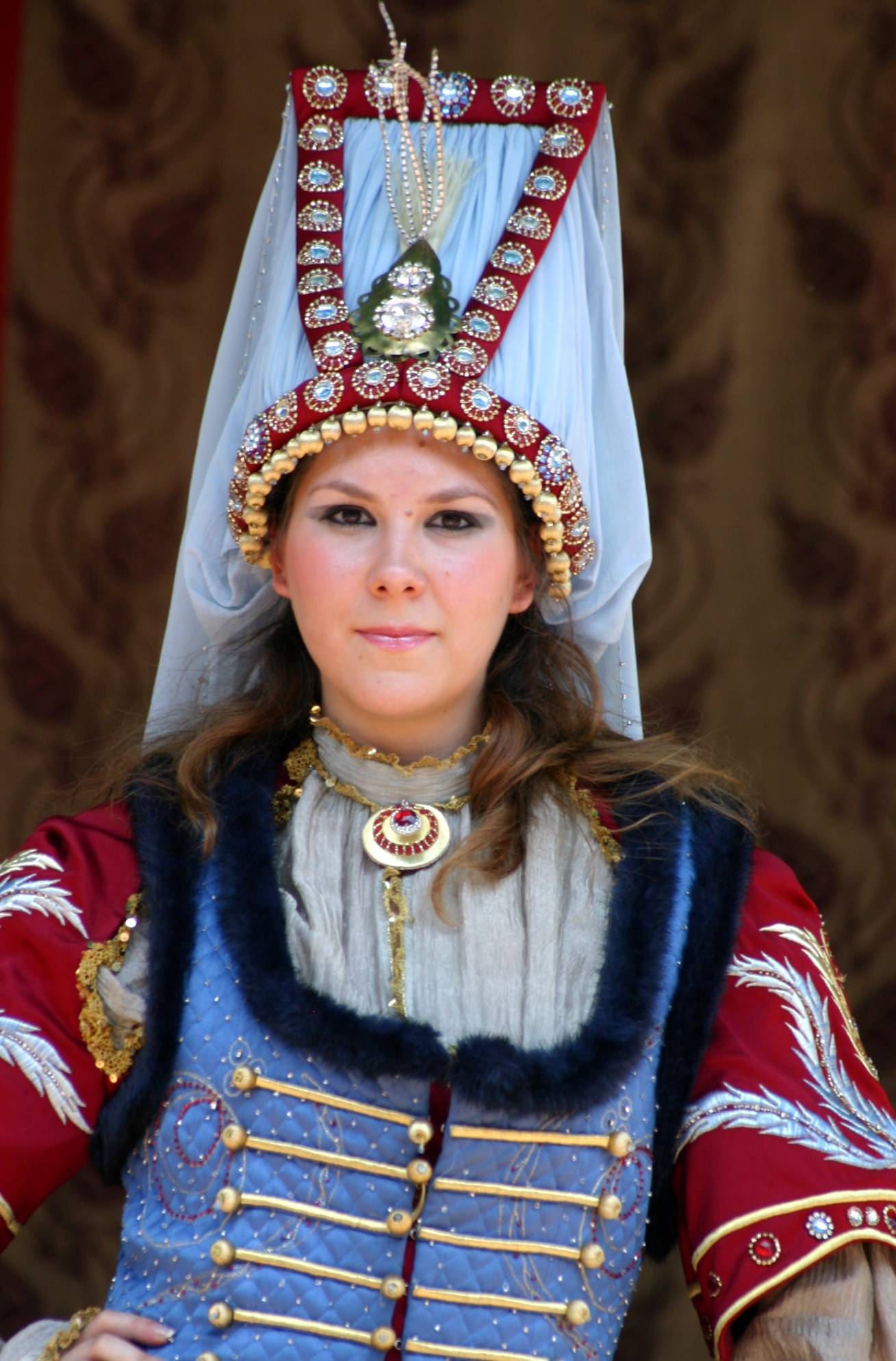
Turkish model at a fashion show, Brussels, Belgium

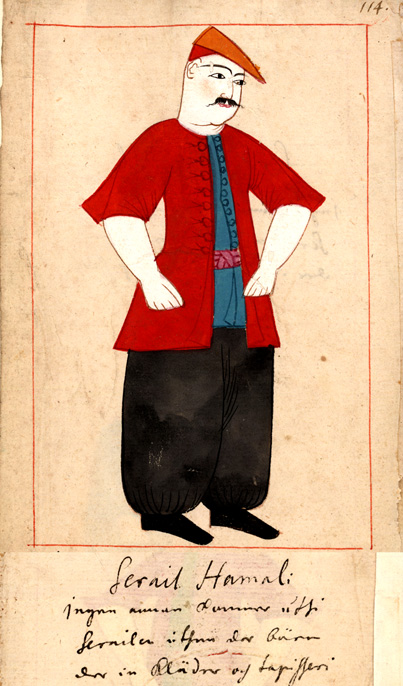
Military Pictures from the Ralamb Costume Book, 1657

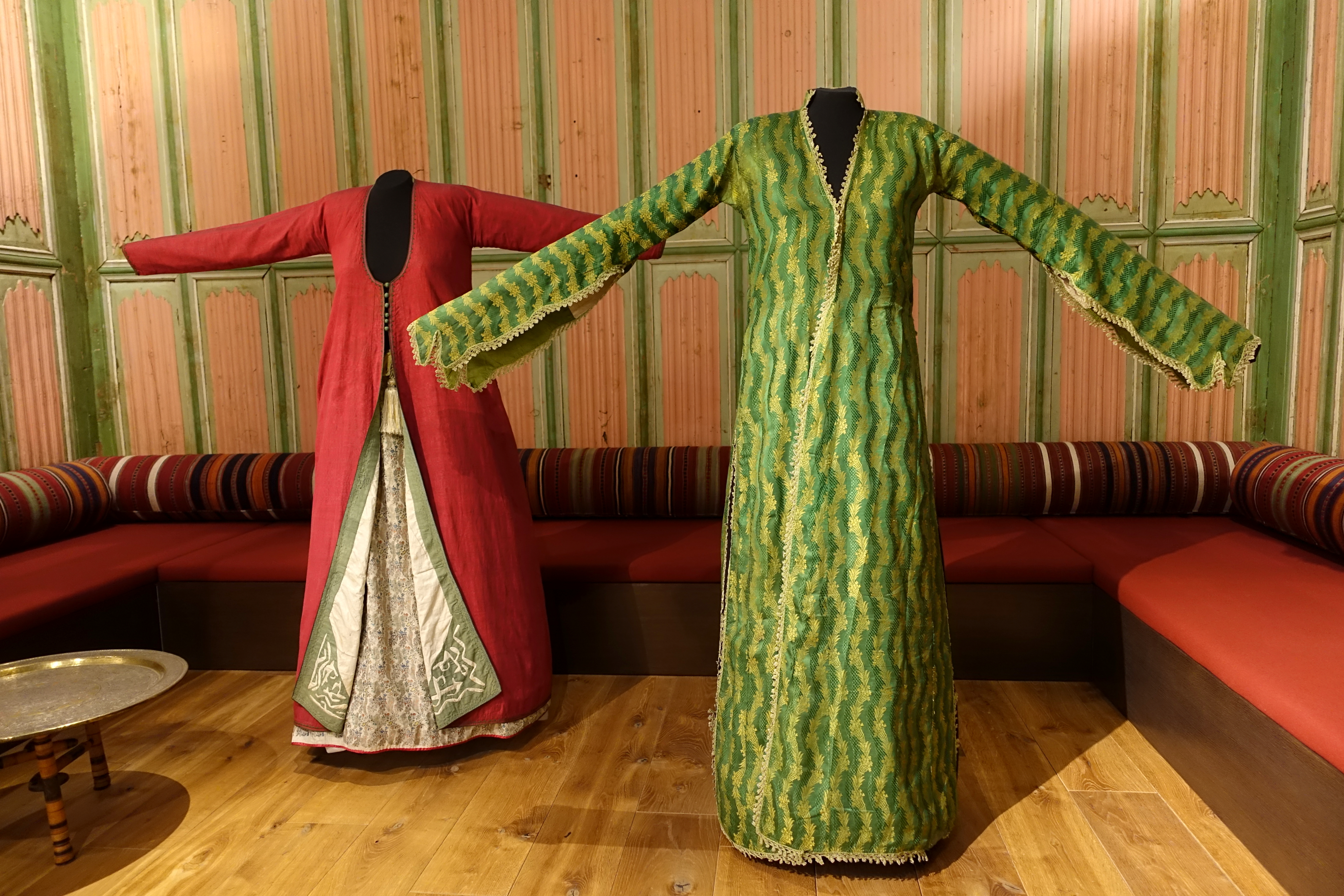
Women's dress, late 1800s, Syria (right) and coat from early 1900s, silk and cotton (left), exhibit in the Rautenstrauch-Joest-Museum, Cologne, Germany

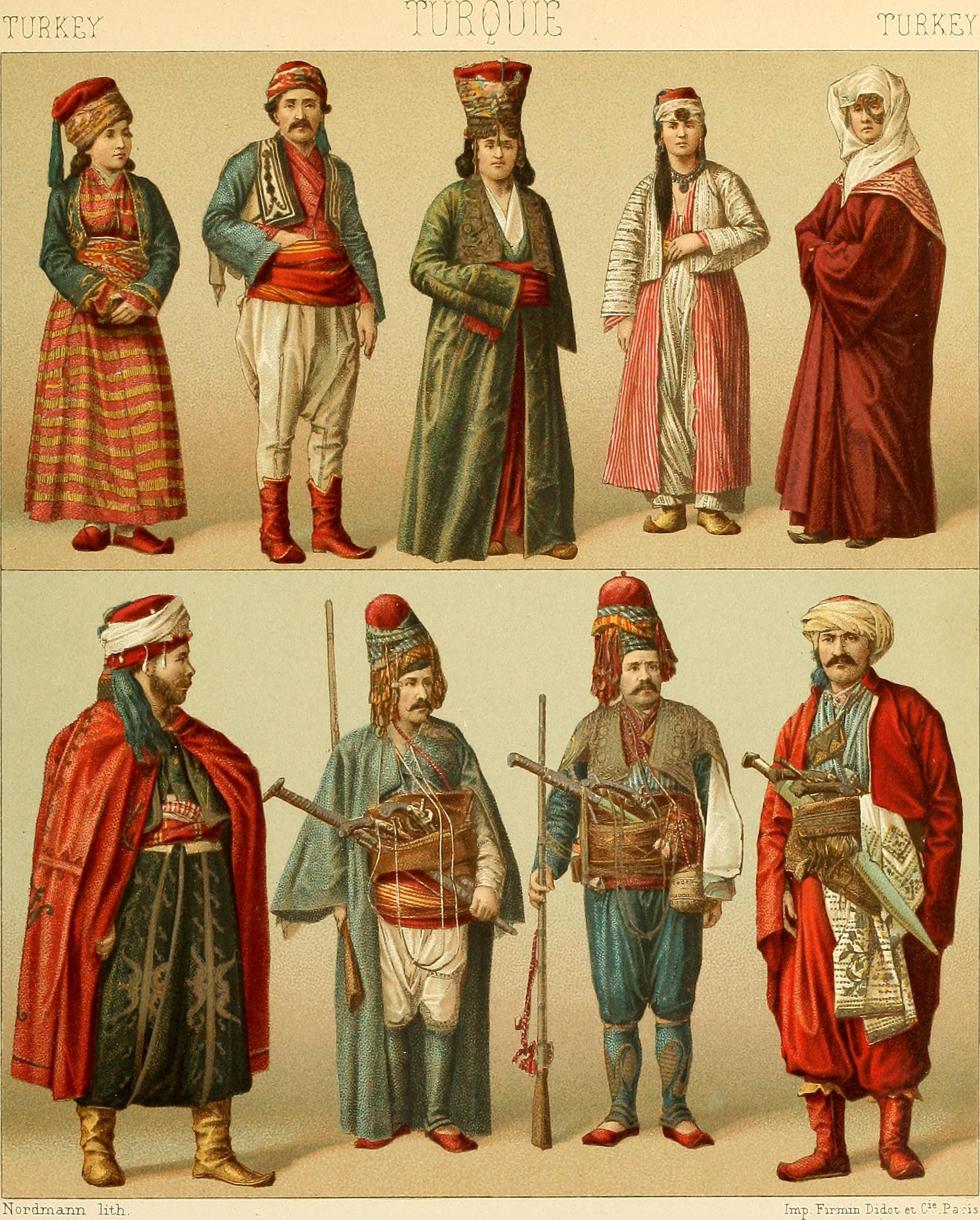
Historical Turkish costumes, 1880s, Smithsonian Libraries

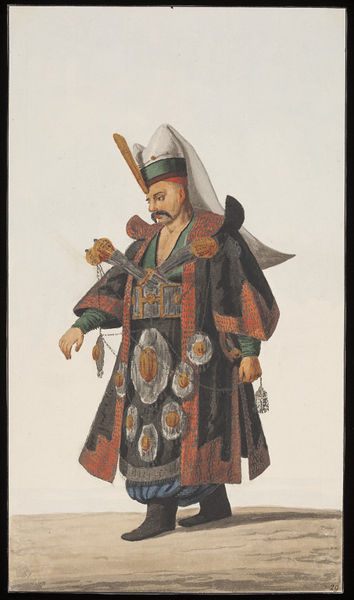
Ashjibashi (head cook) of the Janissaries in ceremonial uniform

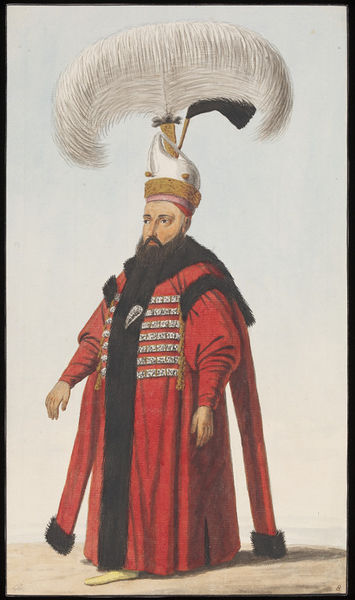
The Kul Kethüdası, commander of the third division of the Janissaries

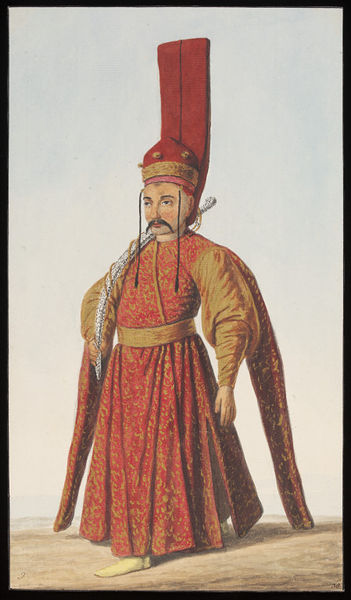
Silahdar Agha, sword-bearer of the Sultan

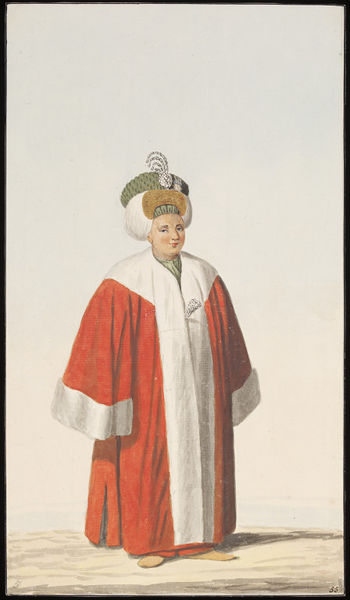
A Şehzade, Ottoman prince of the blood

=== Handcraft ===
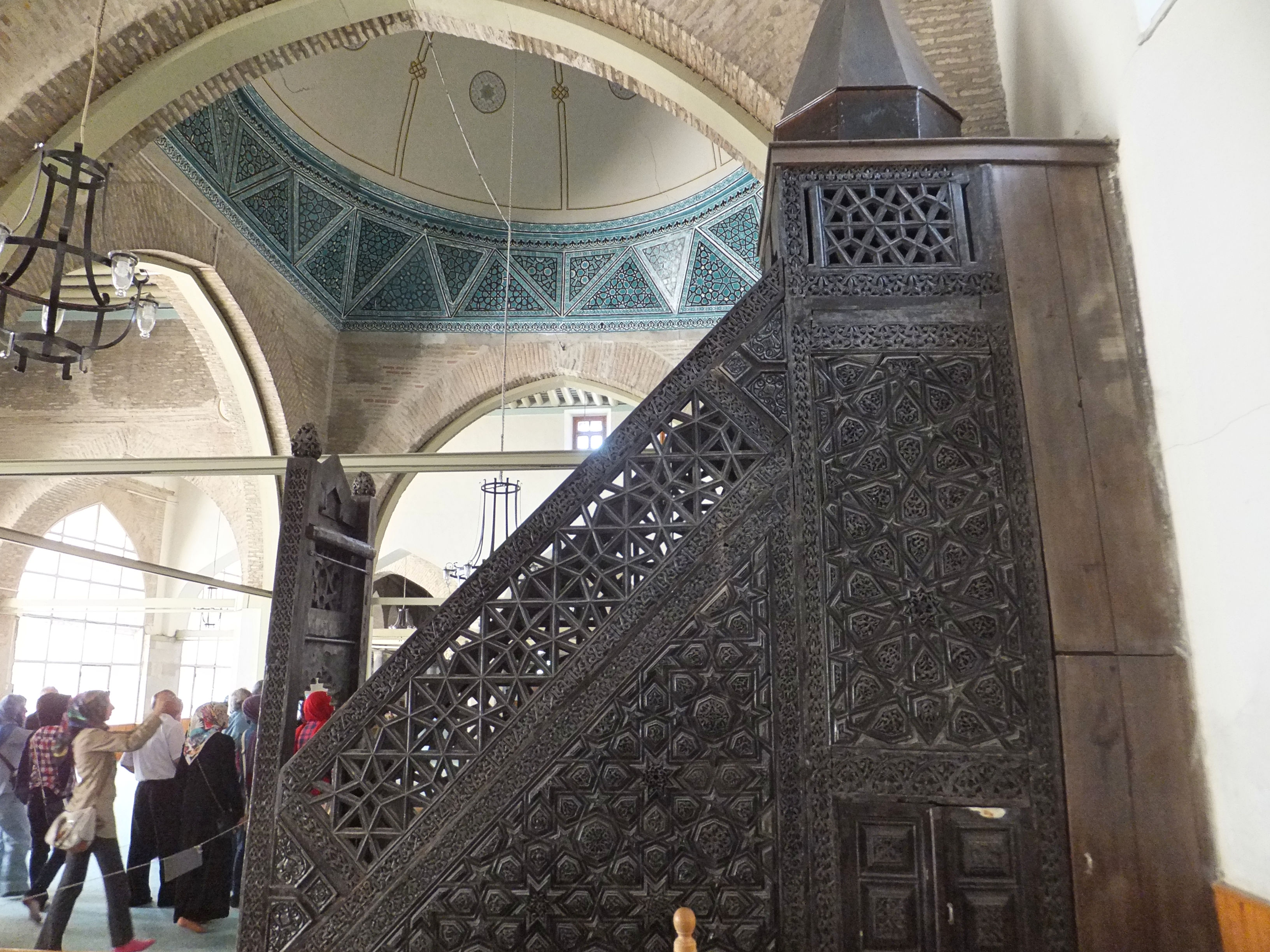
Minbar of the Alaeddin Mosque in Konya, dated to 1155–1156. This minbar is a prime example of the kündekâri technique, in which many interlocking pieces of wood are held together without the use of nails, pins, or glue

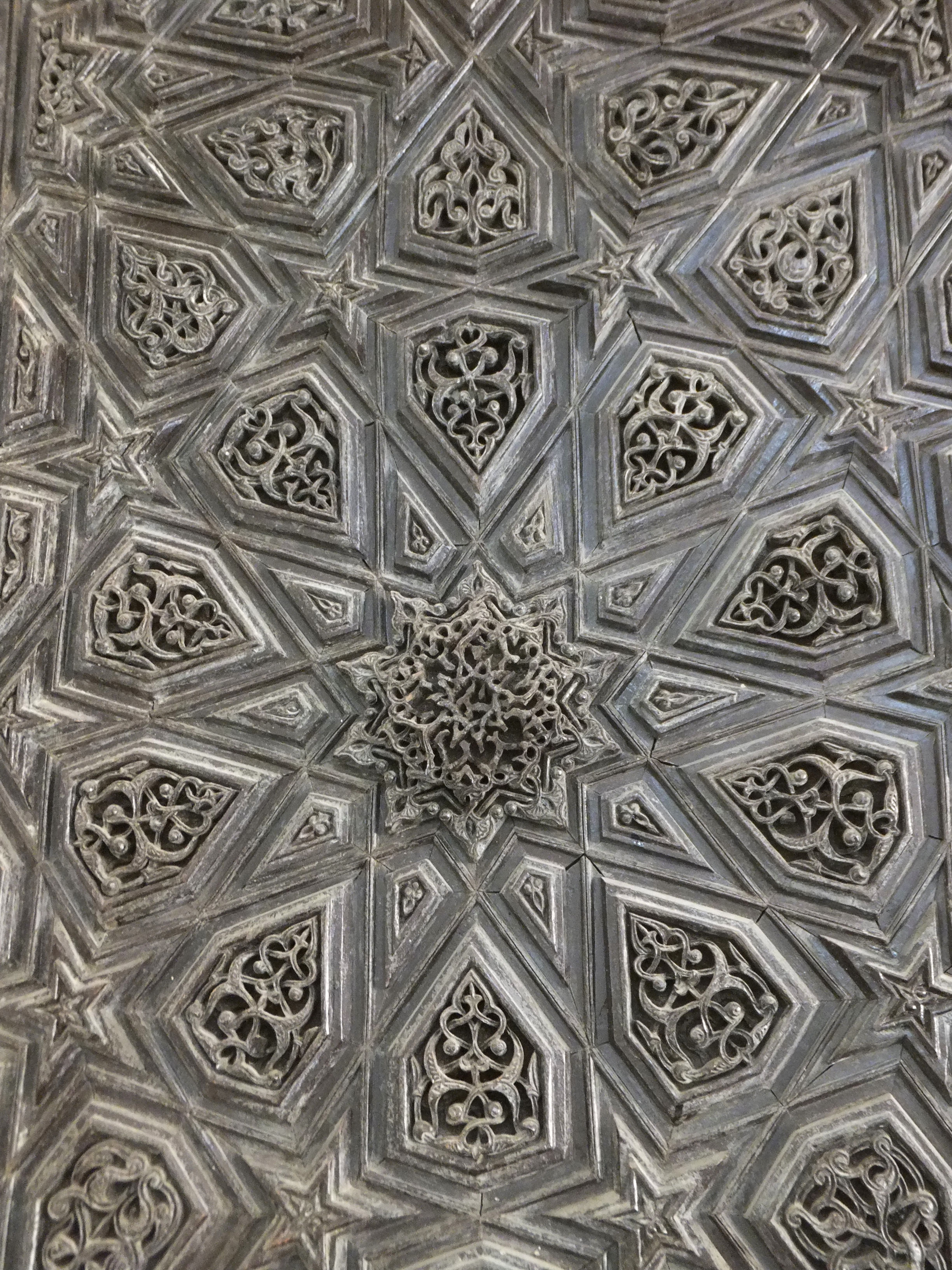
Individual pieces are carved with vegetal arabesque motifs within the wider geometric motif formed by the different pieces

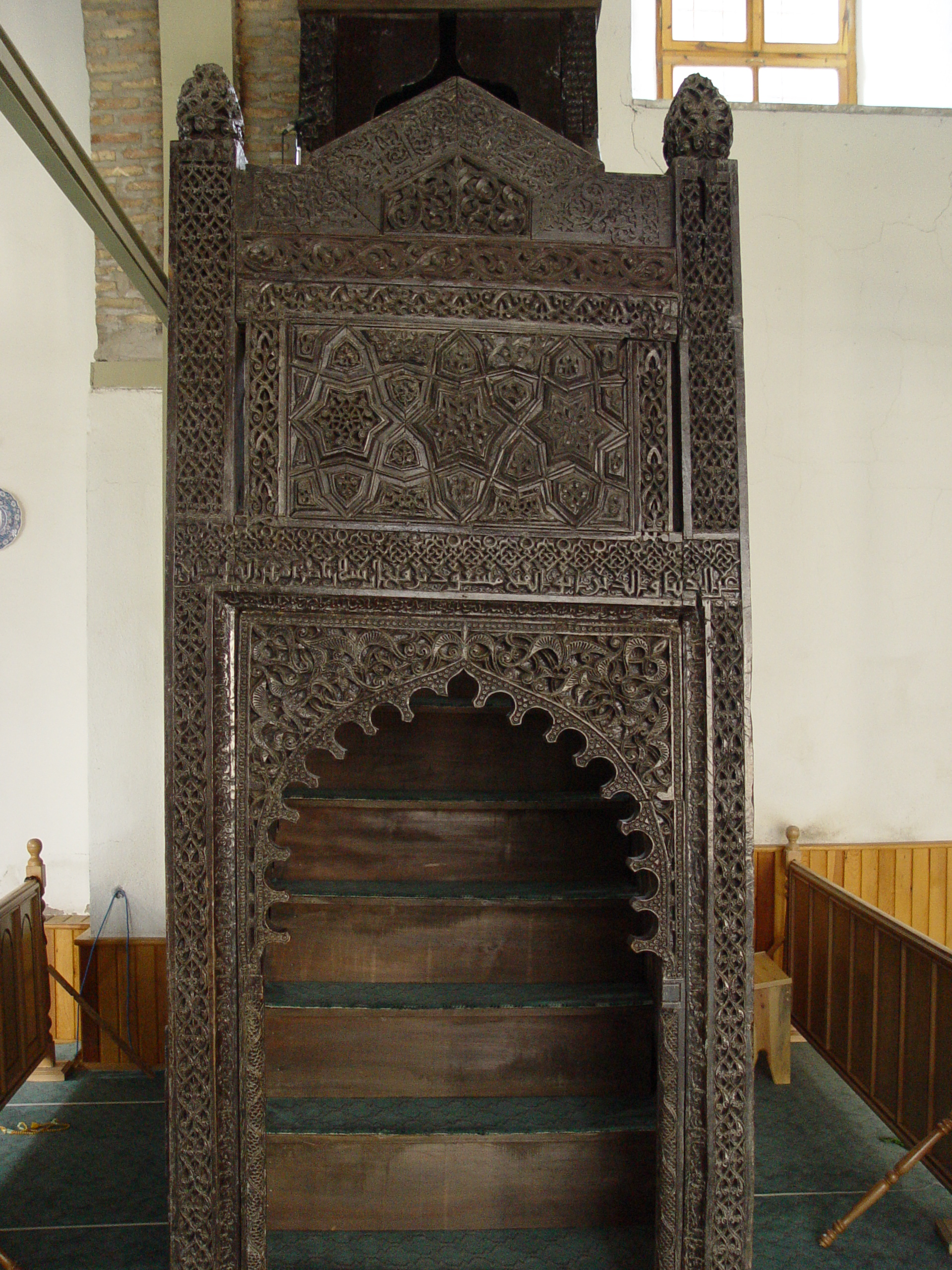
Front part of Alaeddin Mosque's minbar

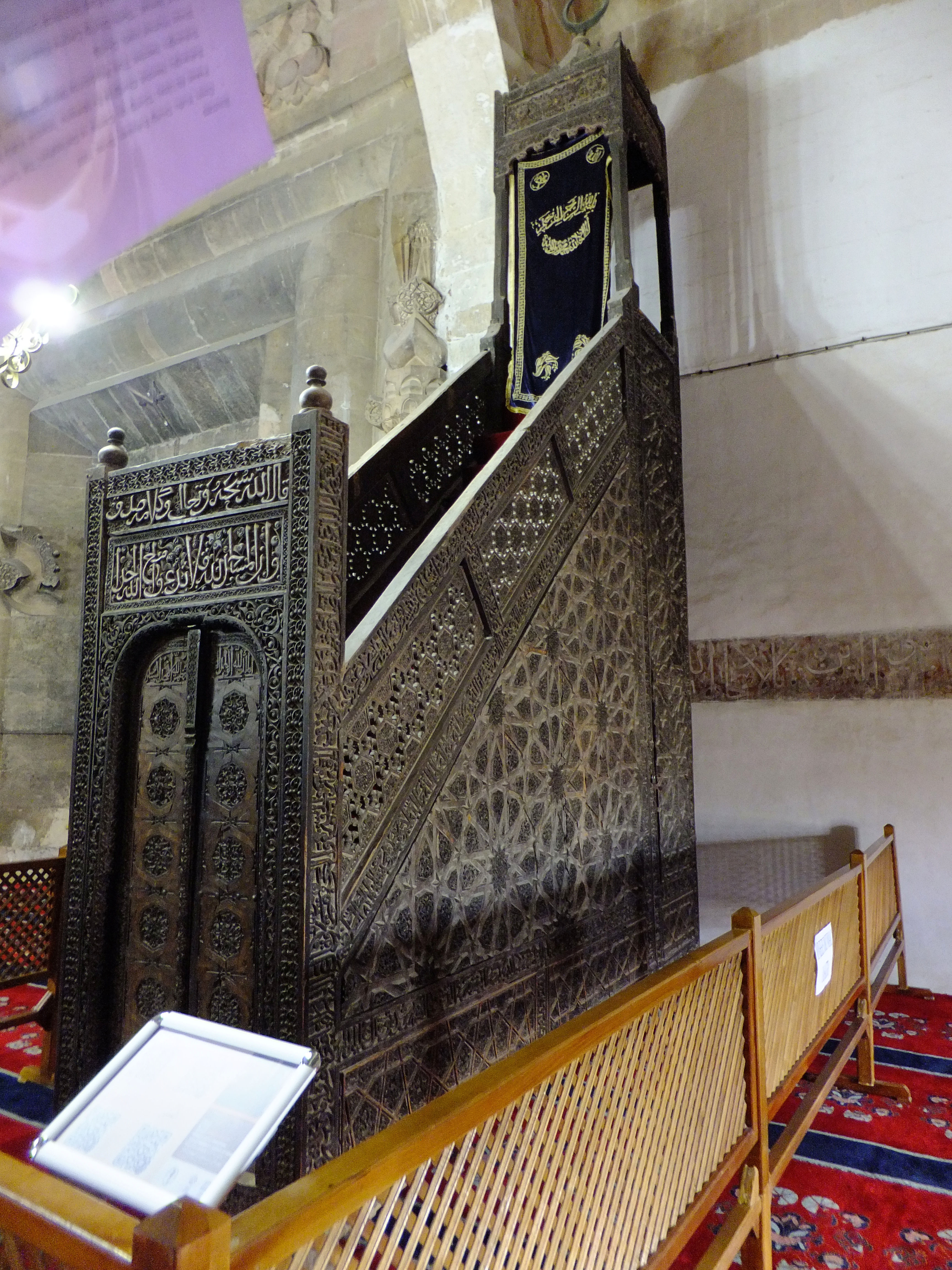
The carved wood minbar of the Divriği Great Mosque and Hospital in Sivas, an example of Seljuk handicraft

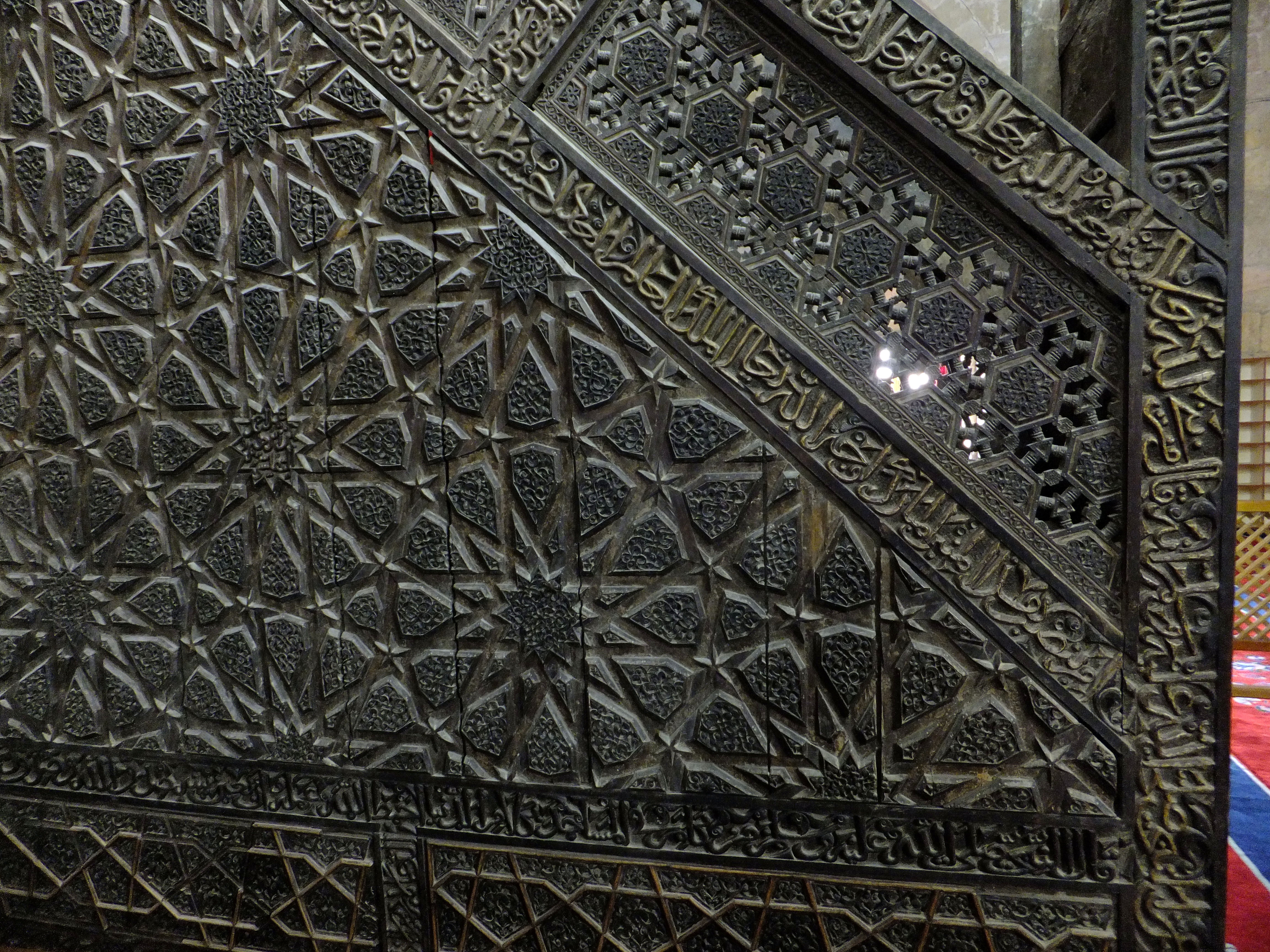
Detail of the Divriği minbar: the lines between the wooden boards mounted side-by-side are visible, while the surface itself is carved with motifs imitating kündekâri work

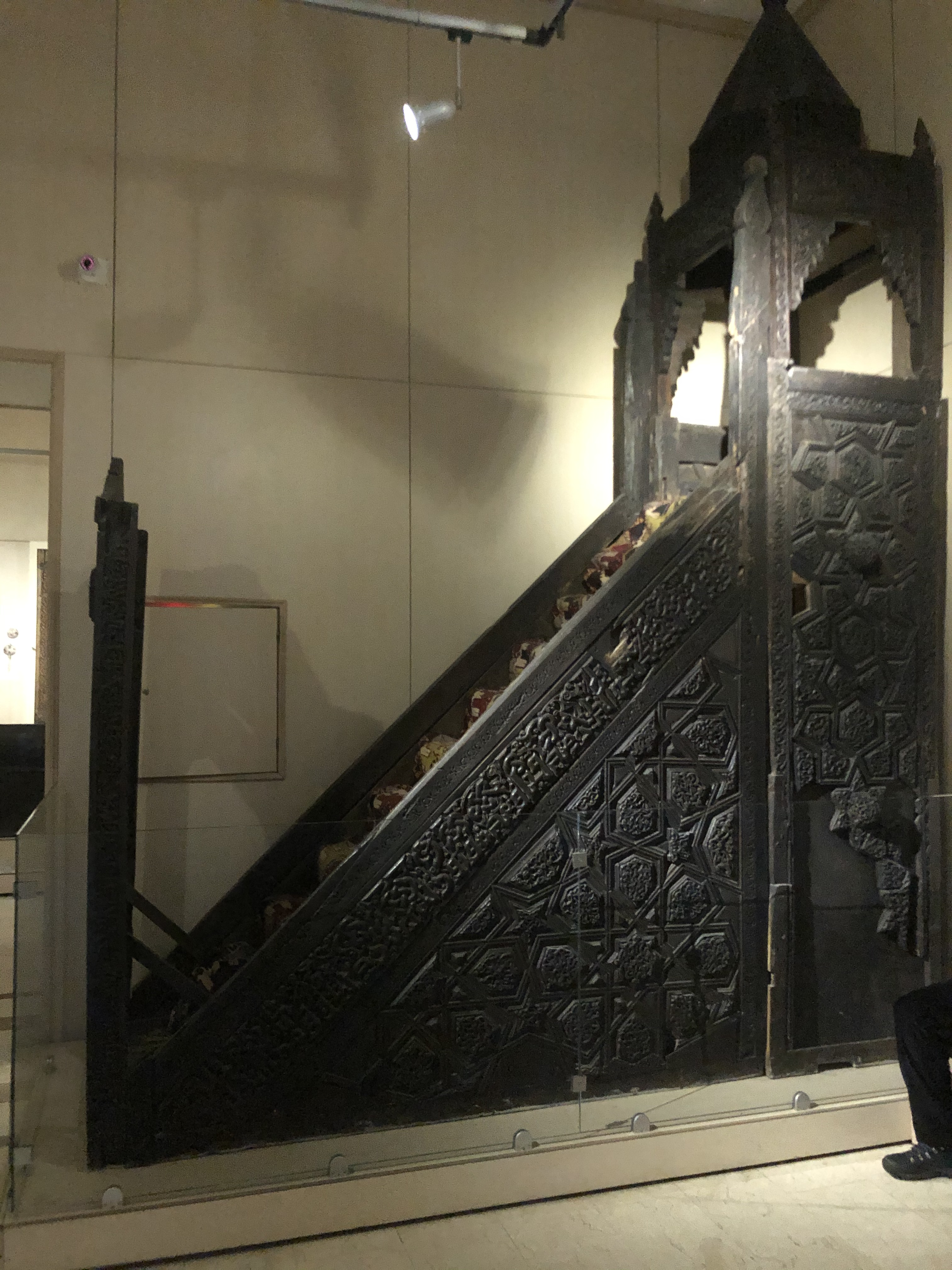
Minbar of the Great Mosque of Siirt (13th century), now housed in the Ethnography Museum of Ankara

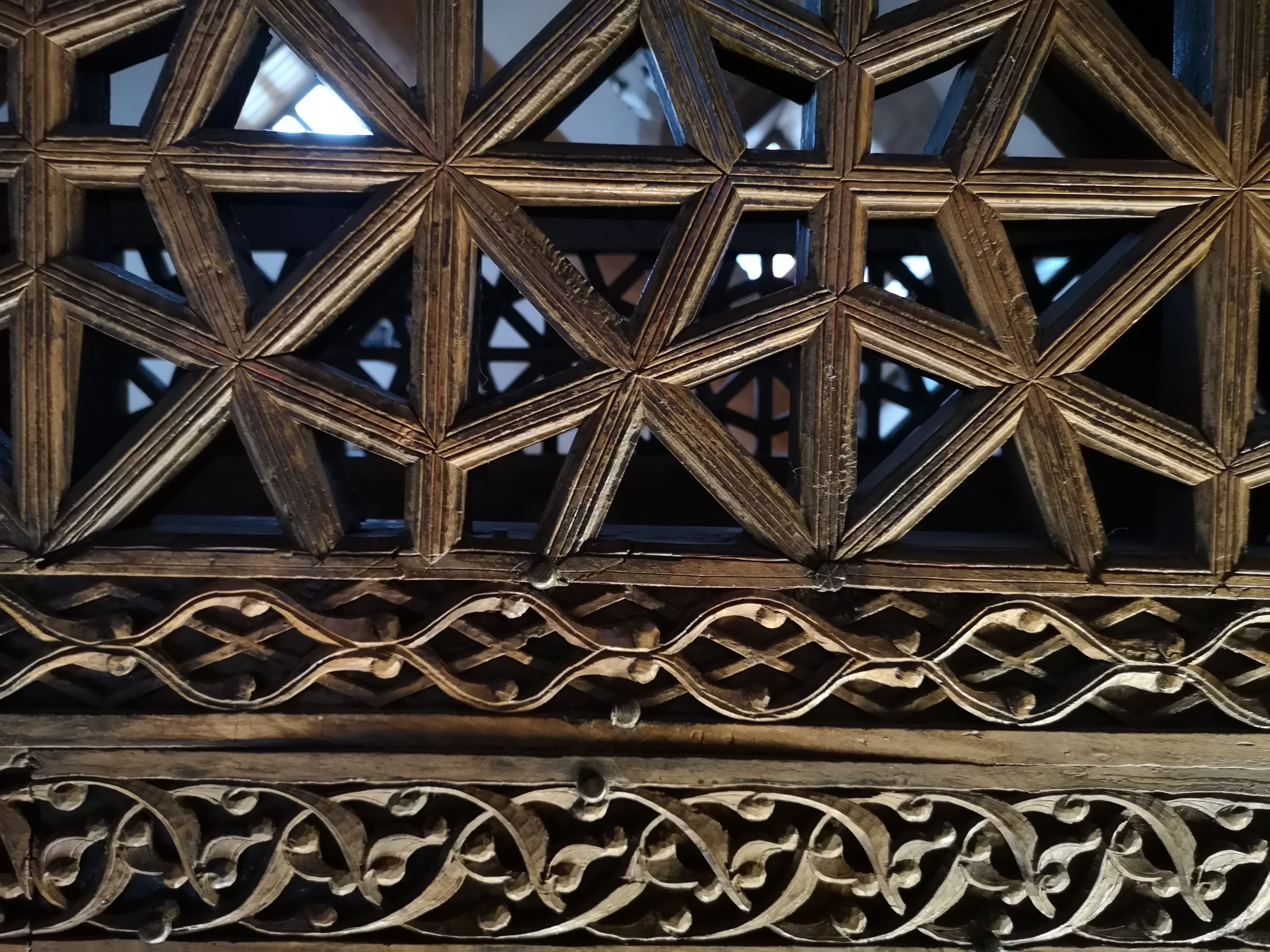
Minbar (pulpit) details at the Aslanhane Mosque, Ankara

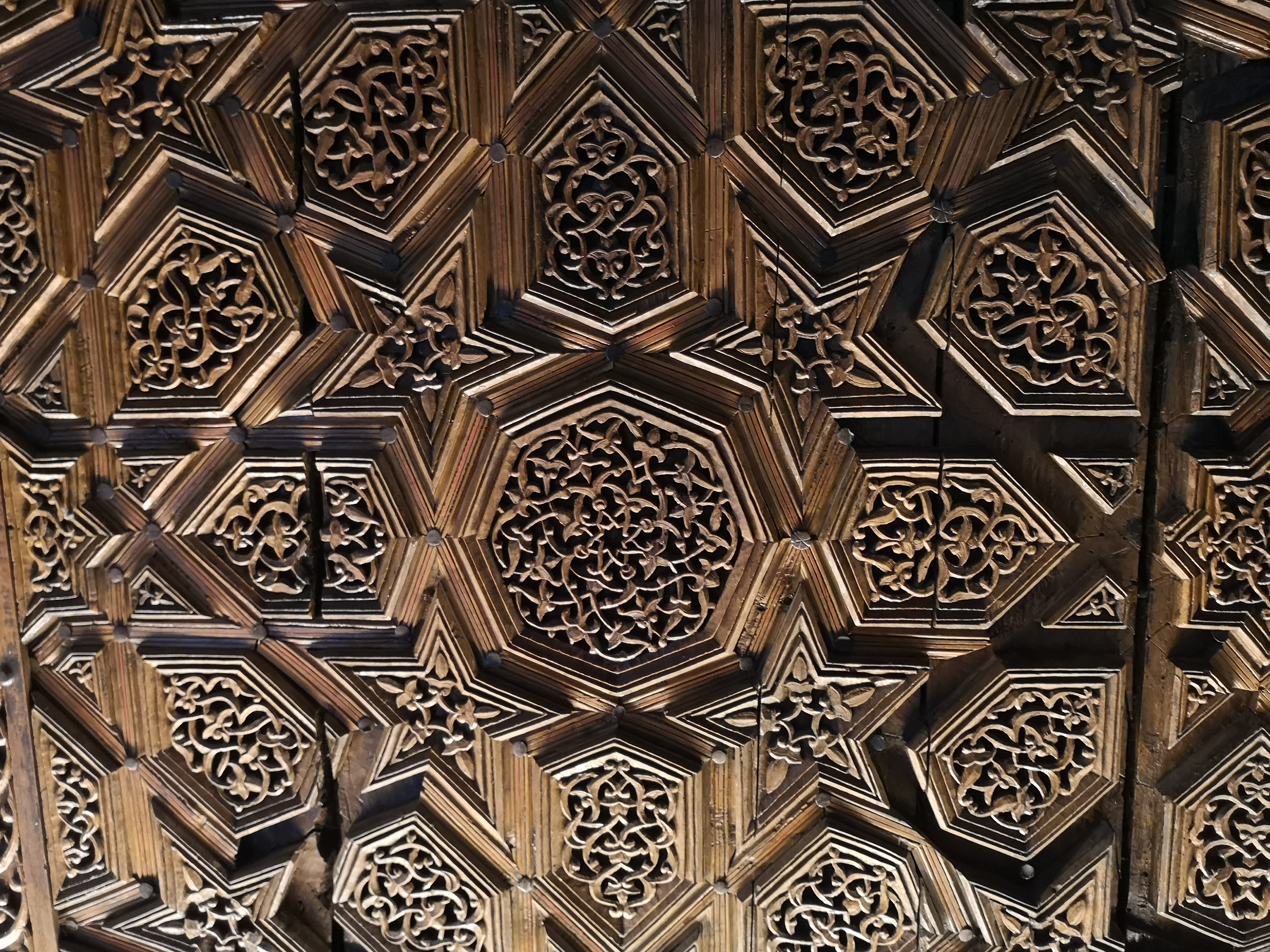
Further details at the Arslanhane Mosque, Ankara

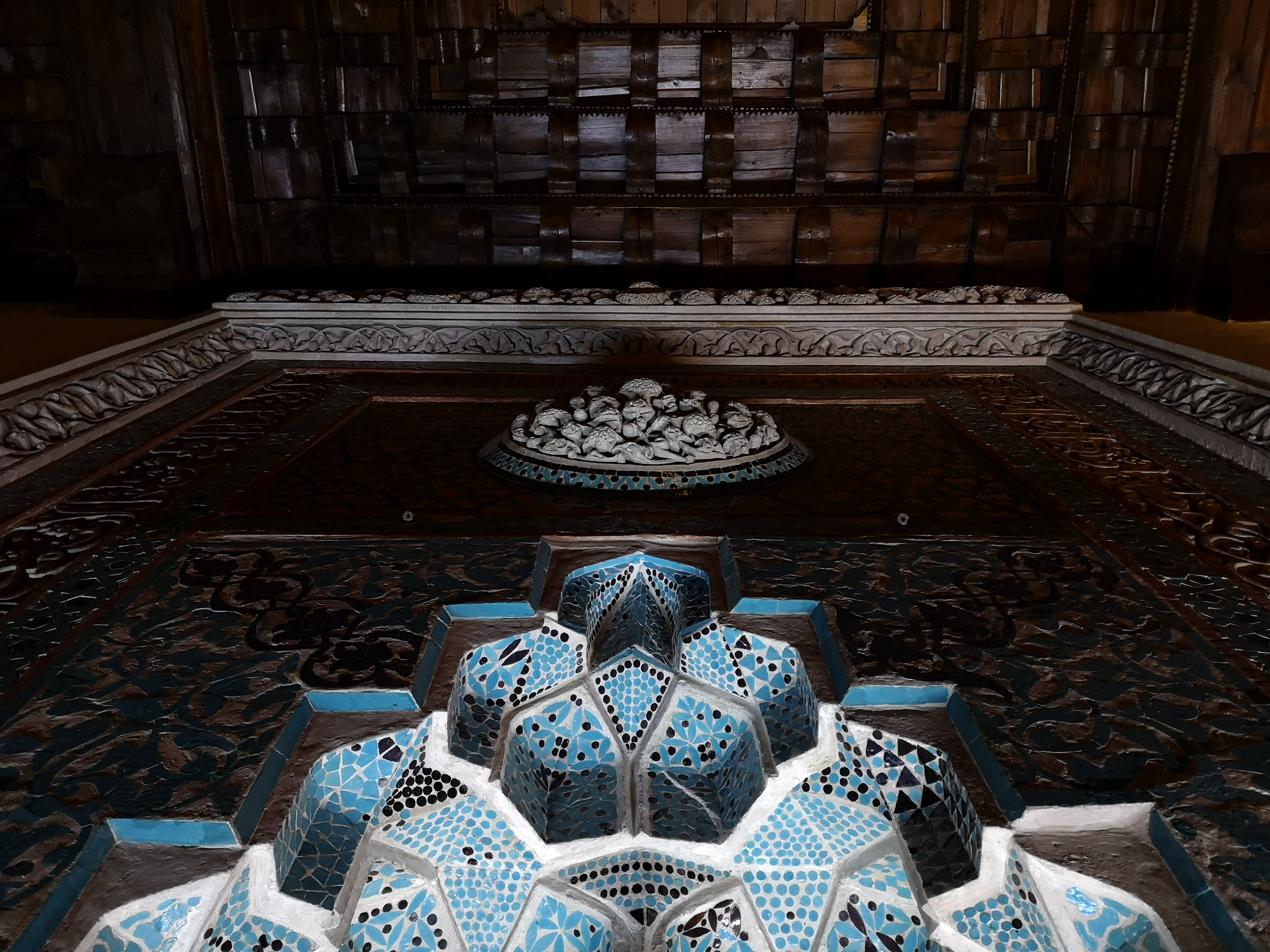
A top view of the mihrab (prayer niche) at the Arslanhane Mosque, Ankara

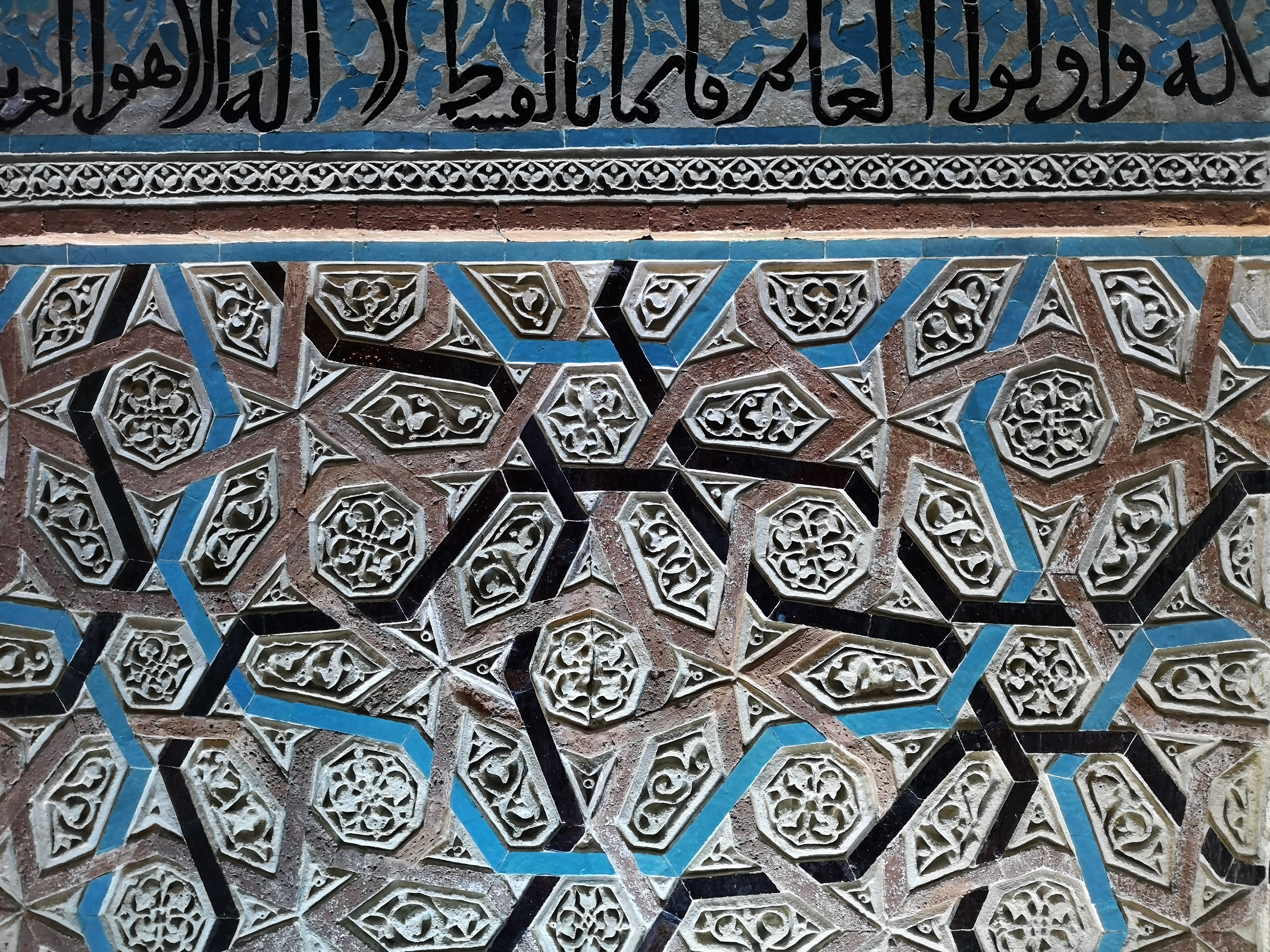
Further details at the Arslanhane Mosque, Ankara

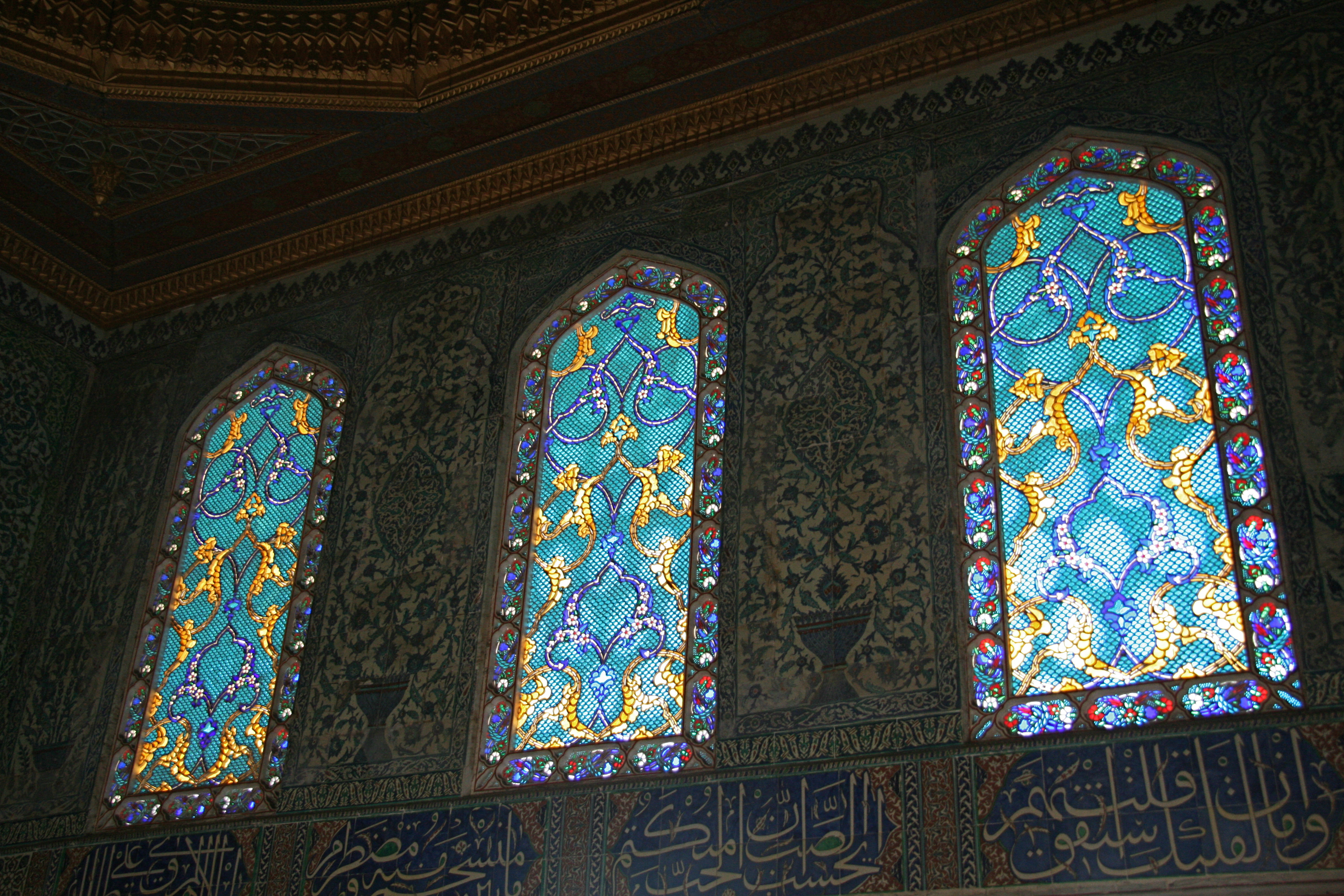
Stained glass windows at Topkapı Palace

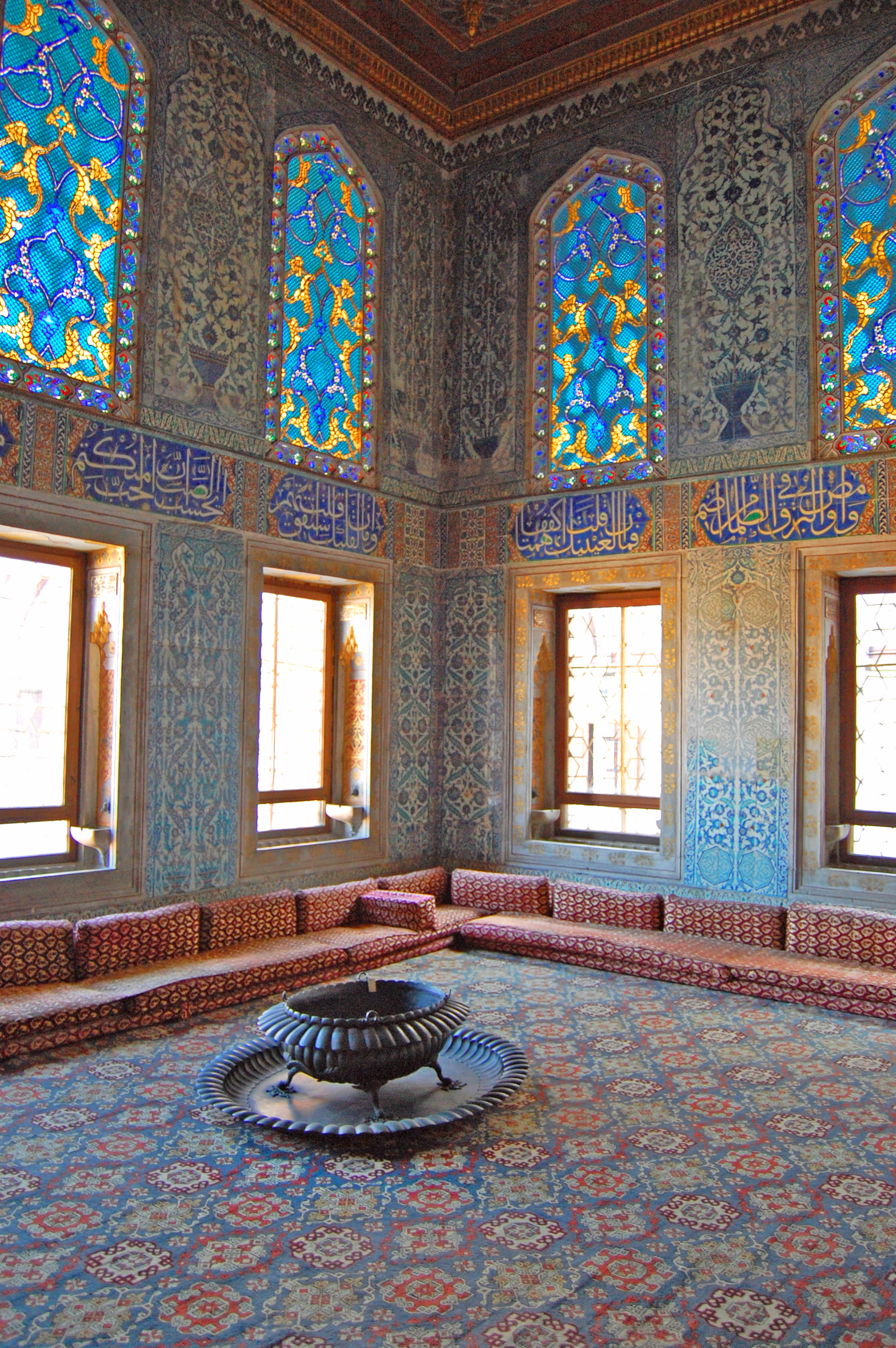
A room at Topkapı Palace, carpet with a small-pattern "Holbein" design

=== Illumination ===
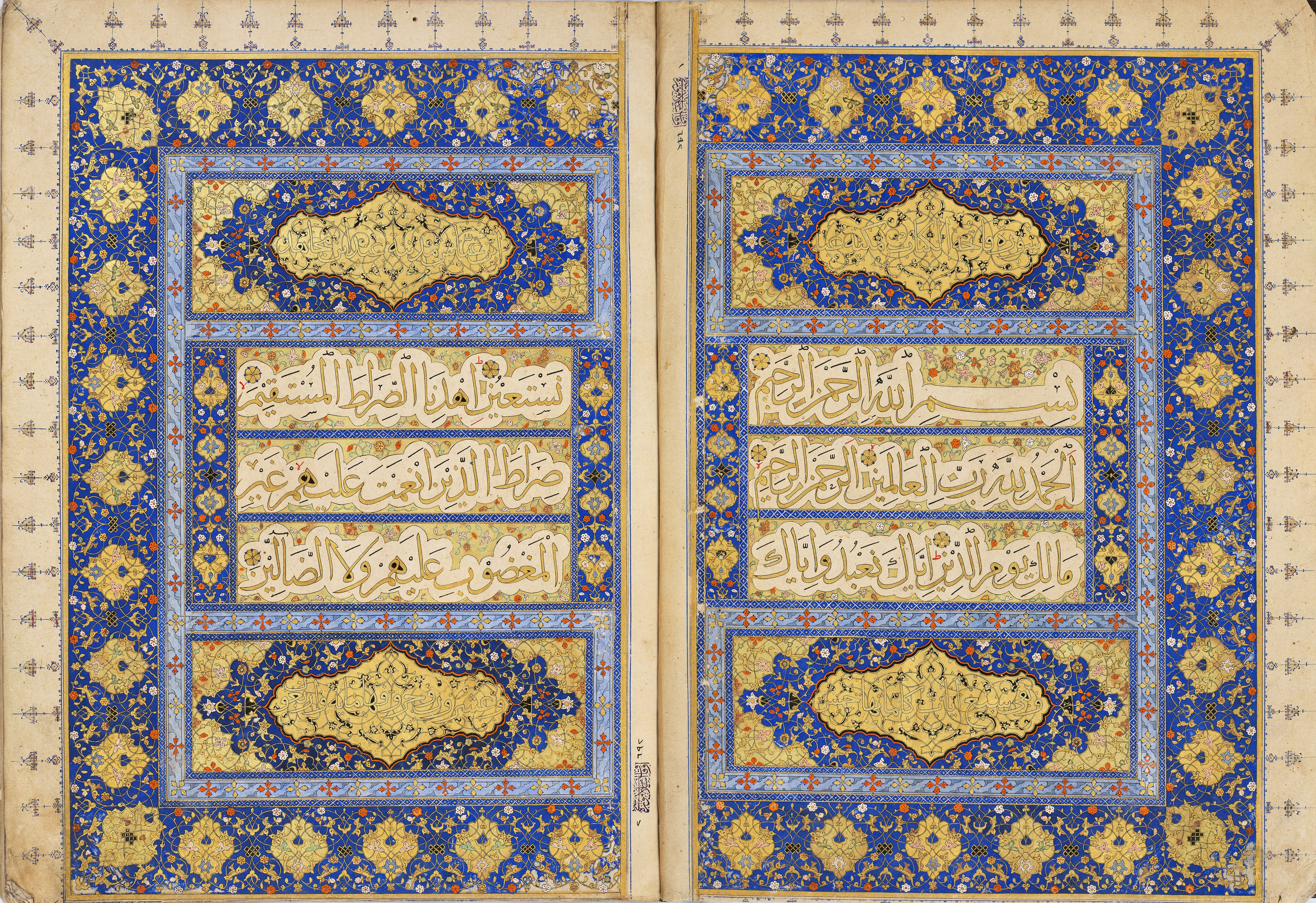
Single-volume Qur’an. Copied by Khalil Allah ibn Mahmud Shah, illuminated by Muhammad ibn Ali

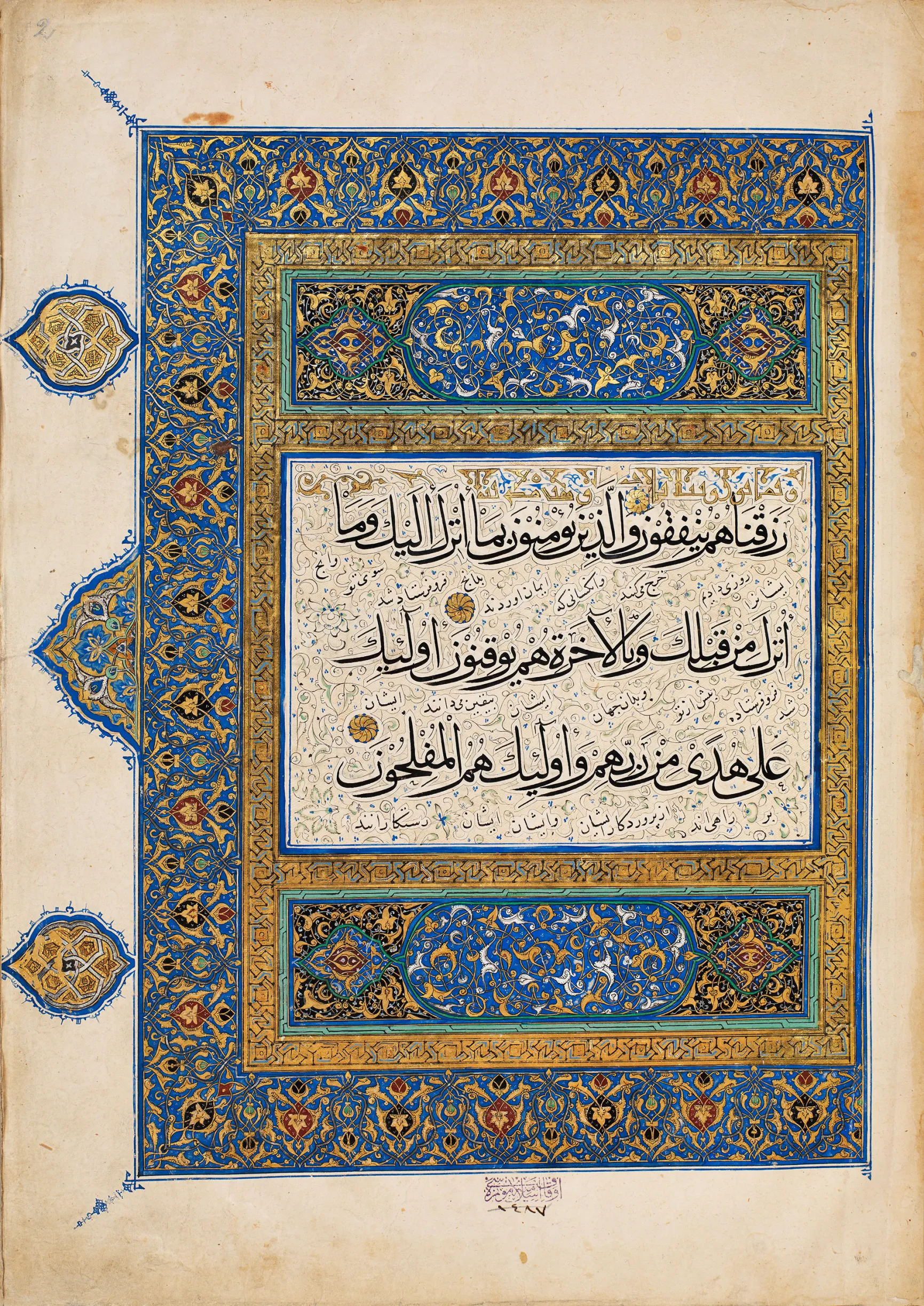
Page from Ottoman Qur'an. Ink, color, and gold on paper. Probably Edirne

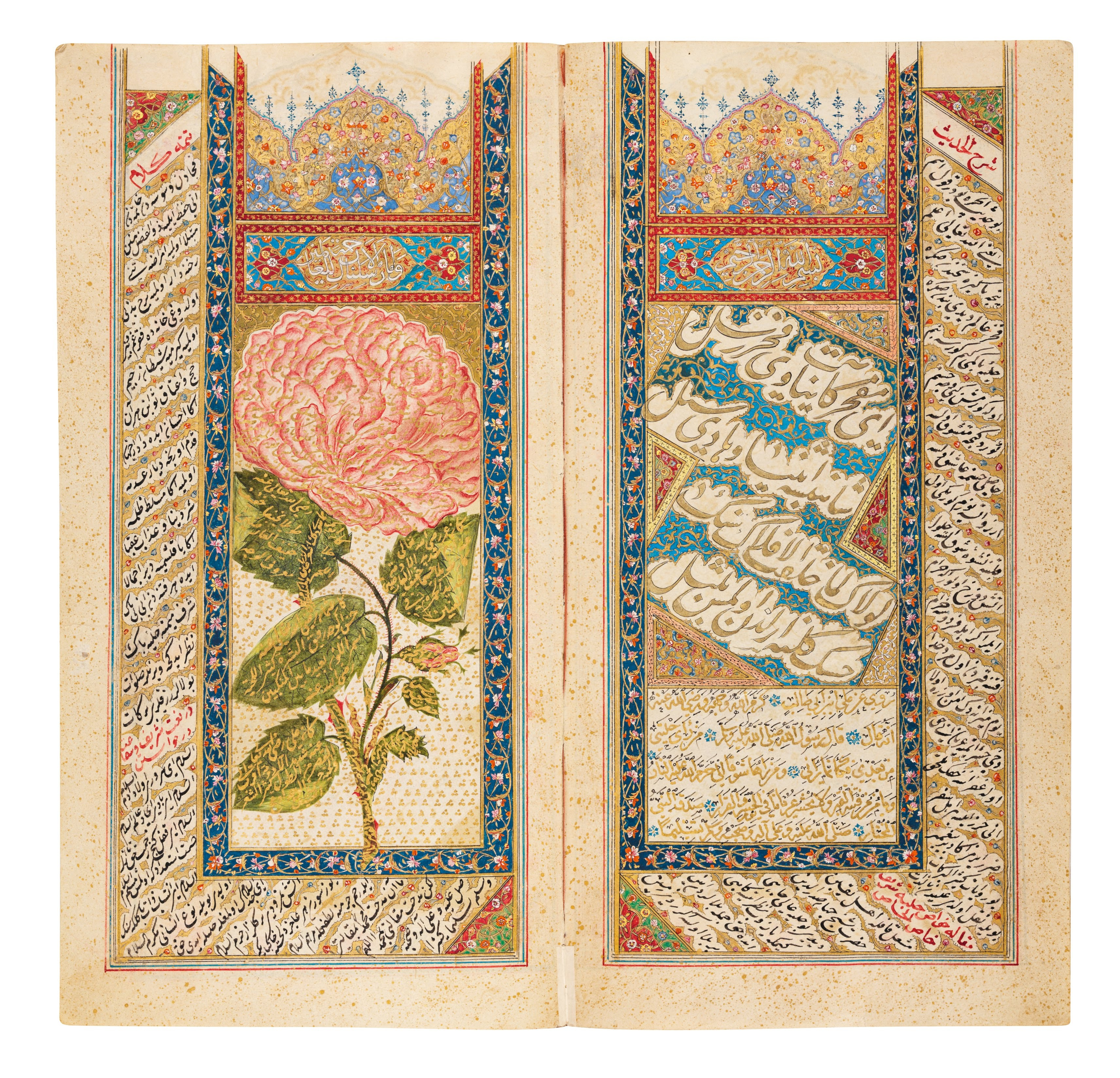
Hilye-i Şerif Anthology, early 19th century in Sadberk Hanım Museum

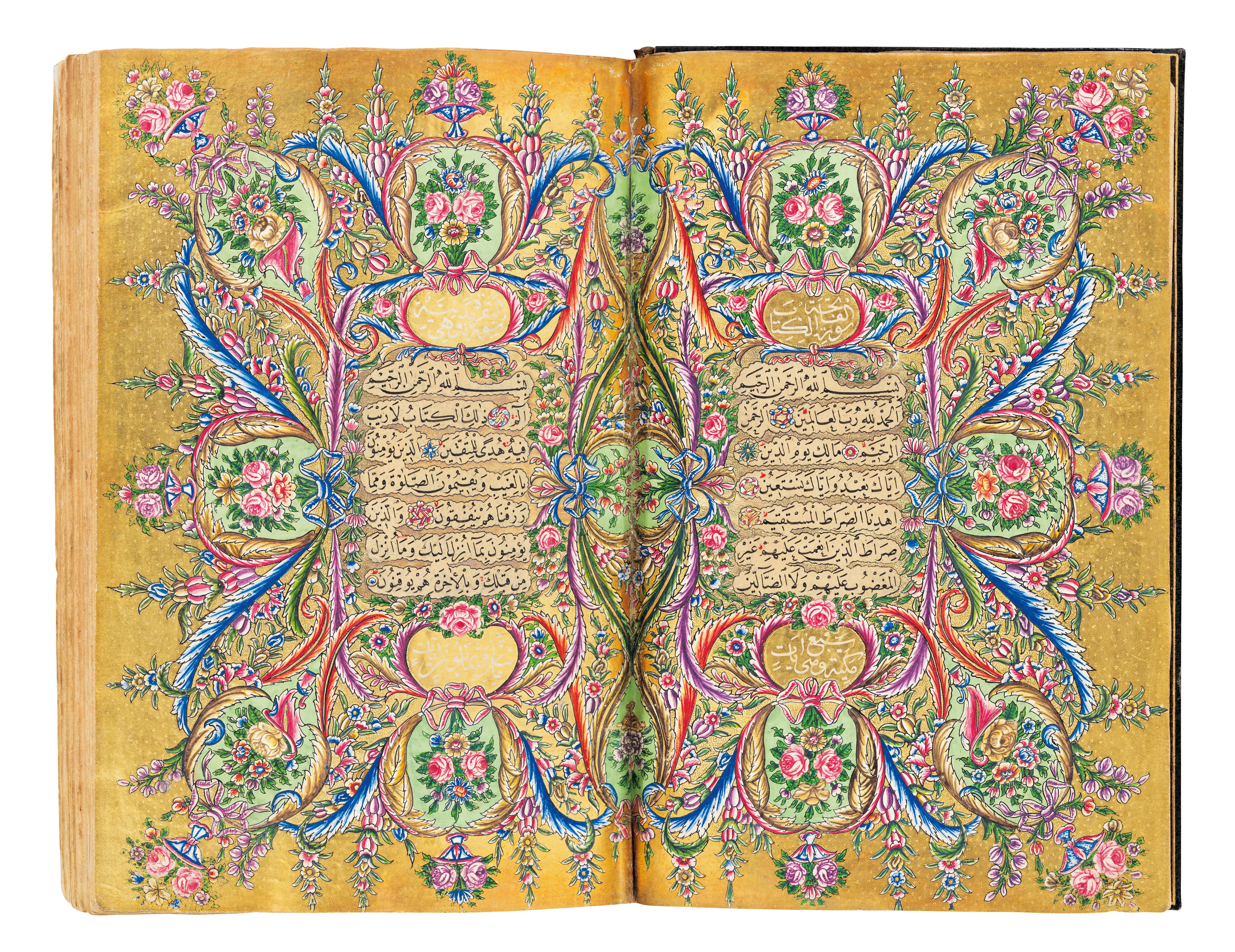
Qur'an copied by Abdullah Zühdi

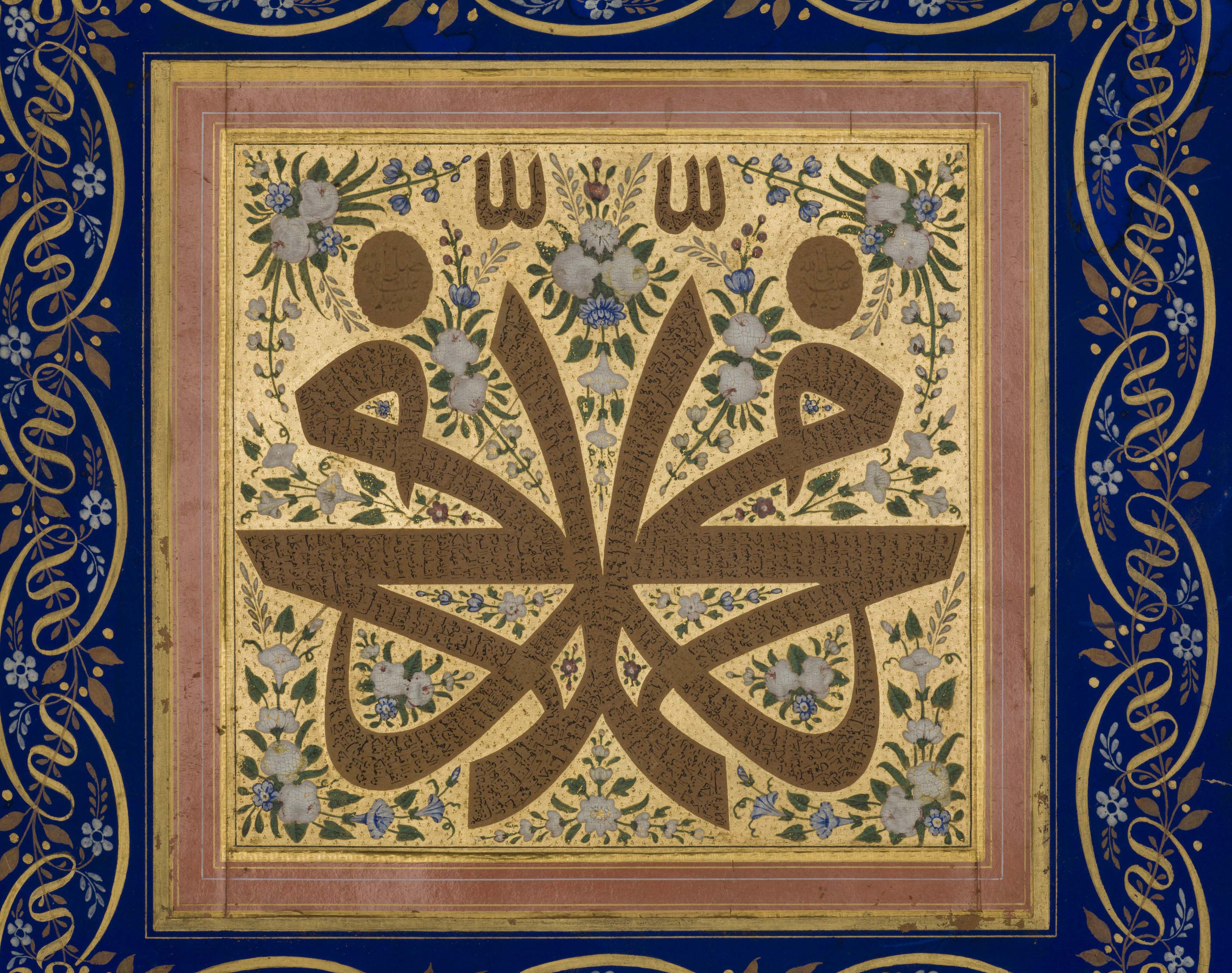
The name 'Muhammad' is written in mirrored thuluth script, and filled with Qur'anic verses in ghubar

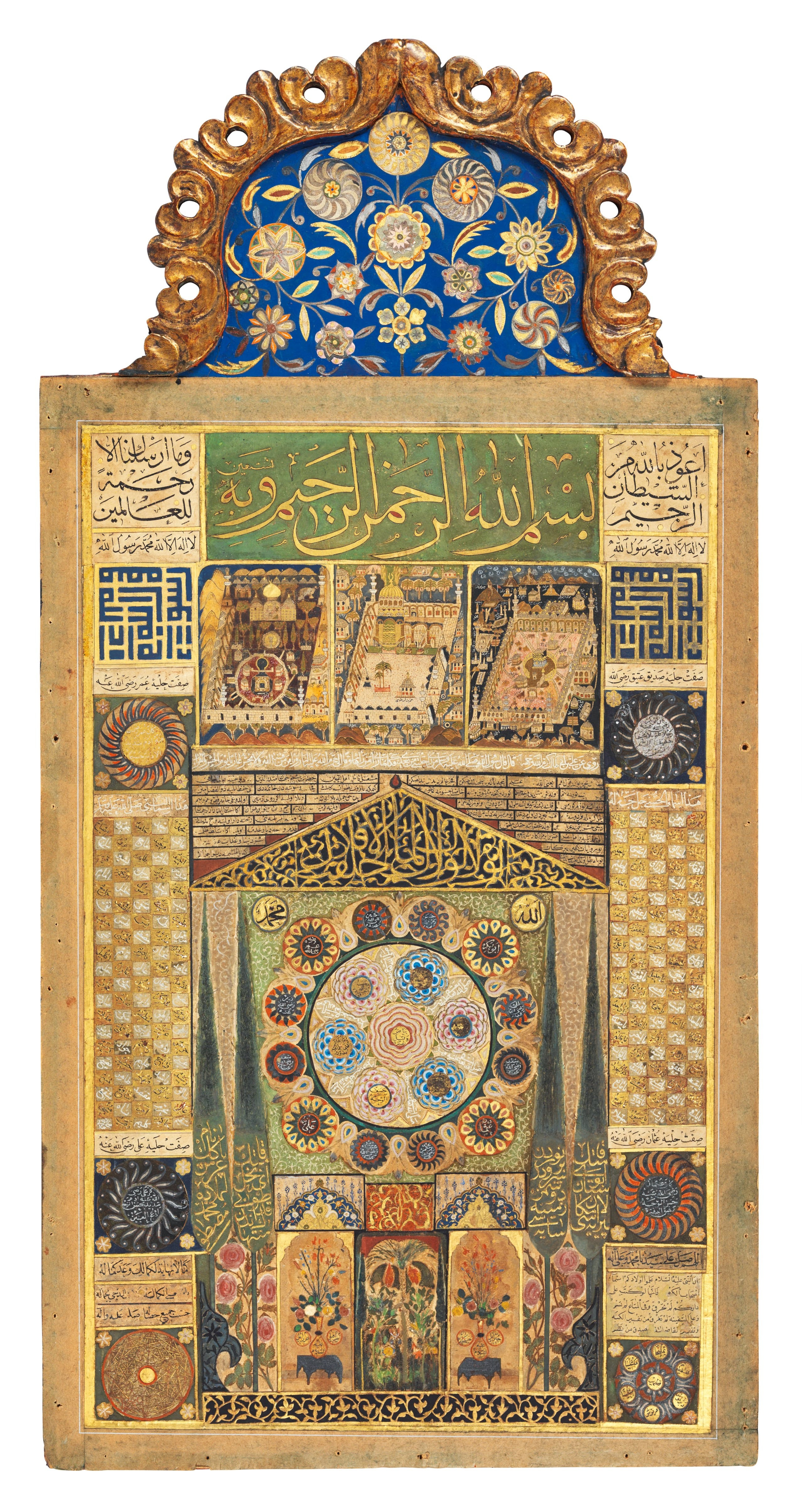
Hilye-i Şerif. Unknown, Ottoman, circa 1725 in Sadberk Hanım Museum

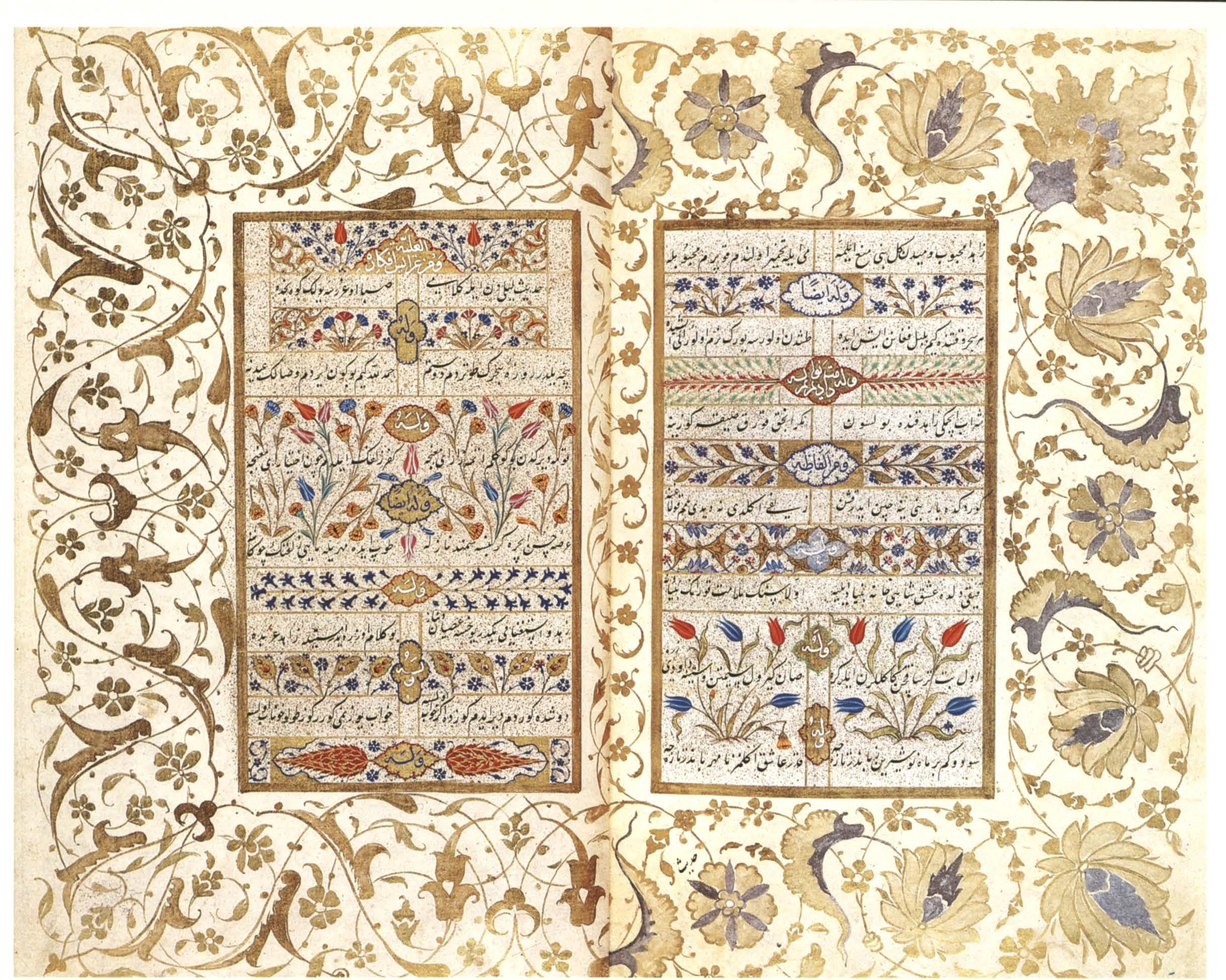
"Divan-i Muhibbi", Calligraphy in nastaliq by Mehmed Şerif, illumination by Kara Memi, Istanbul, 1566

=== Miniature ===
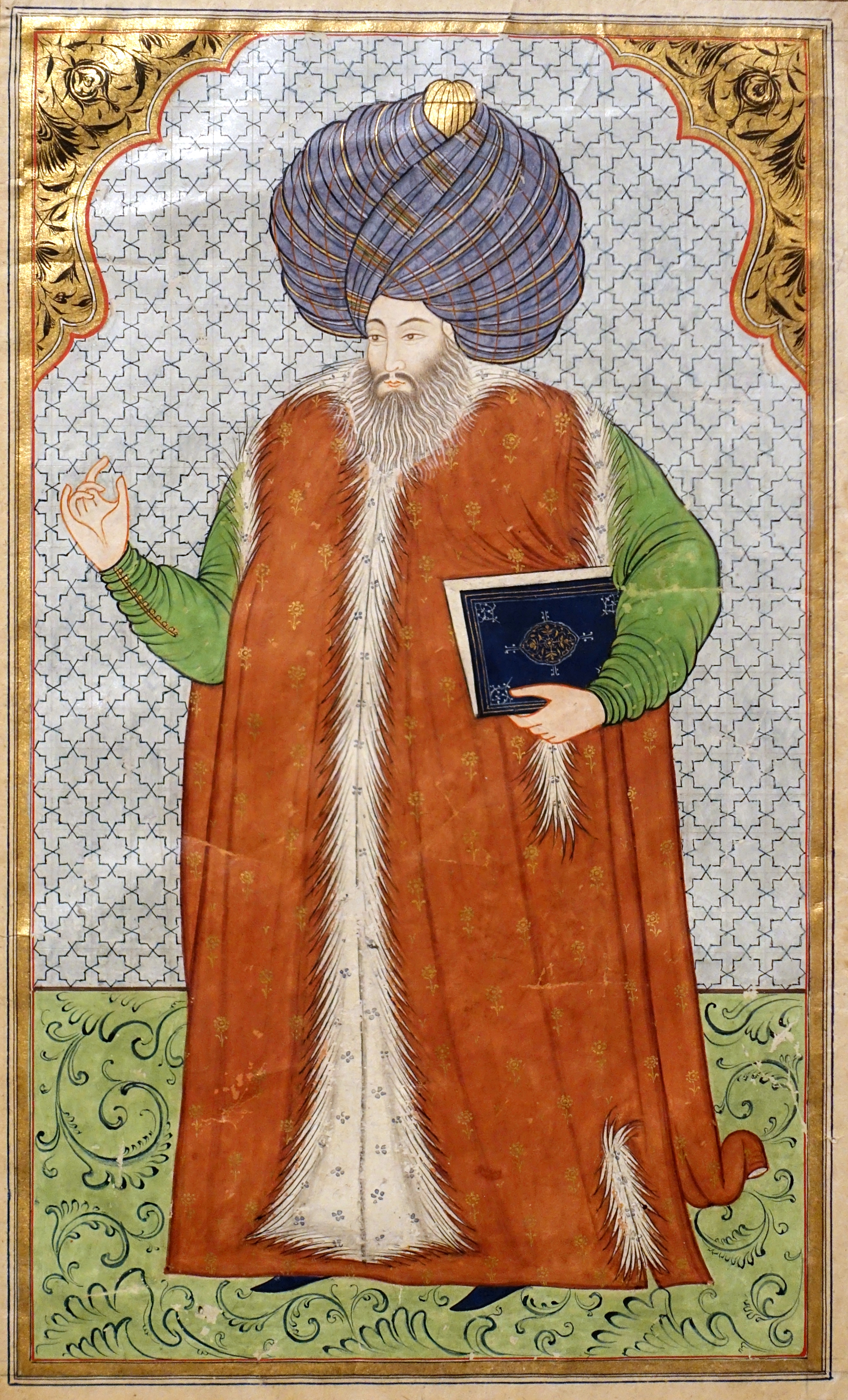
An Ottoman official miniature

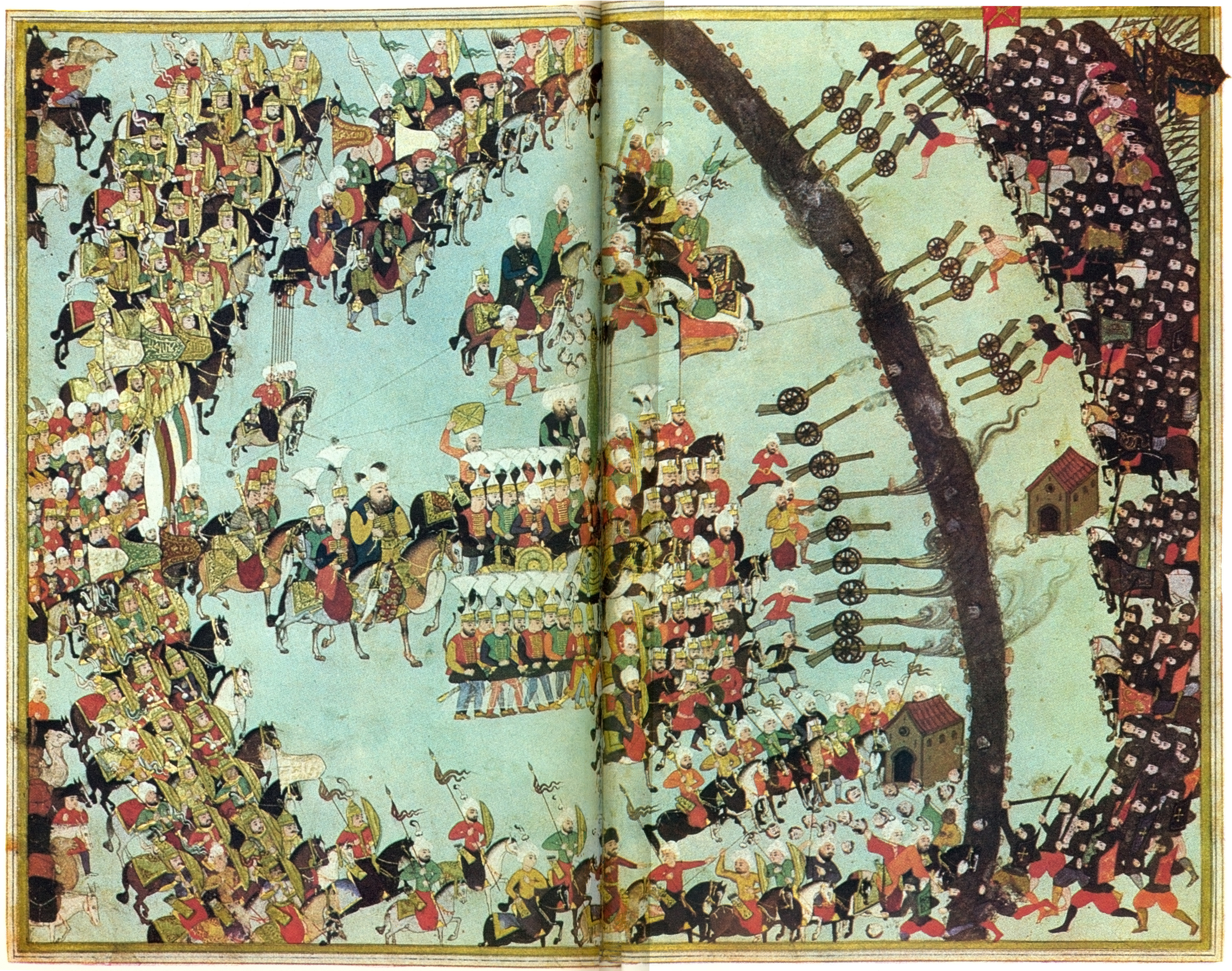
Miniature depiction of the Battle of Mezőkeresztes, Hungary (1596)

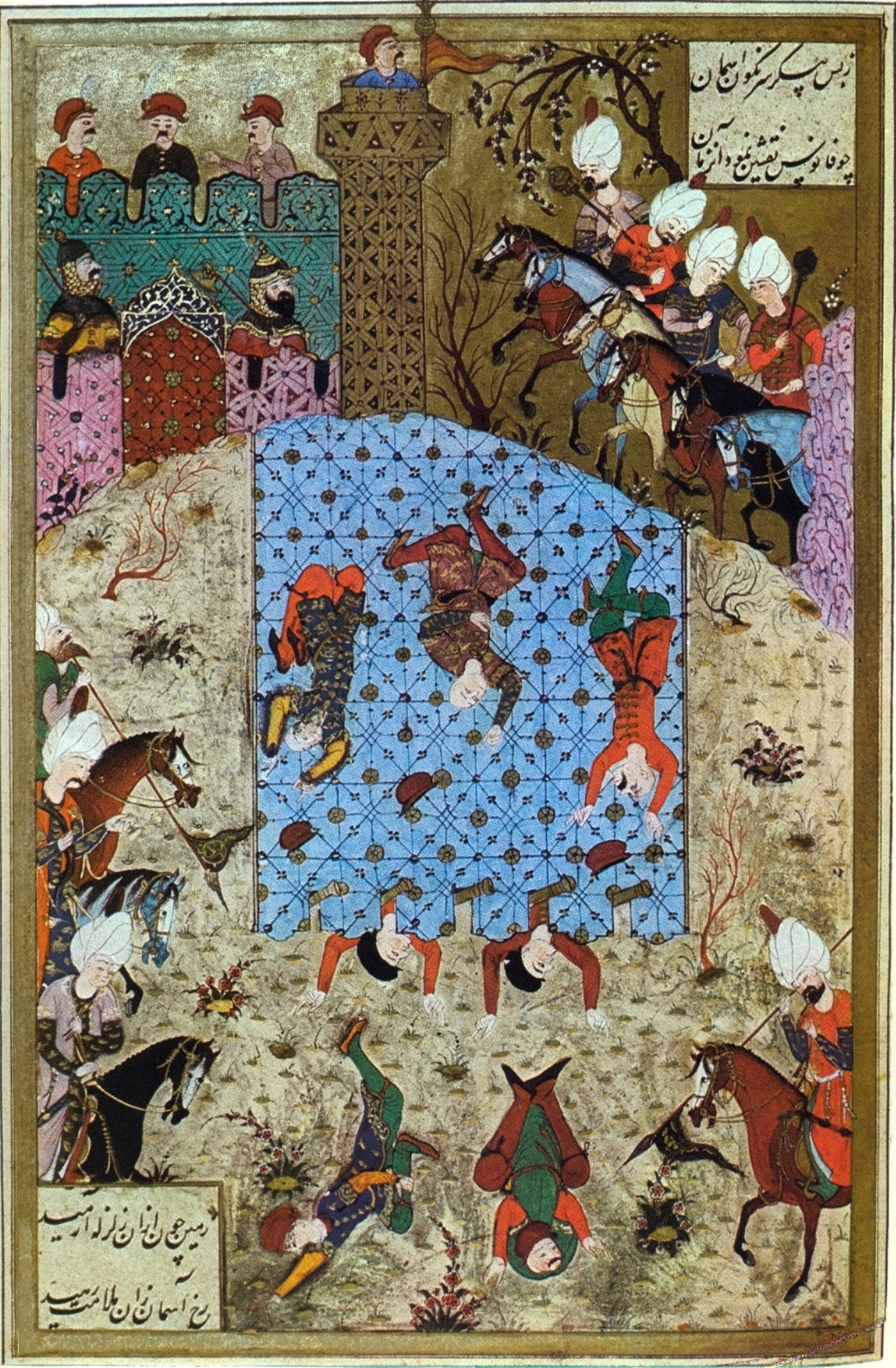
Capture of Buda (1526)

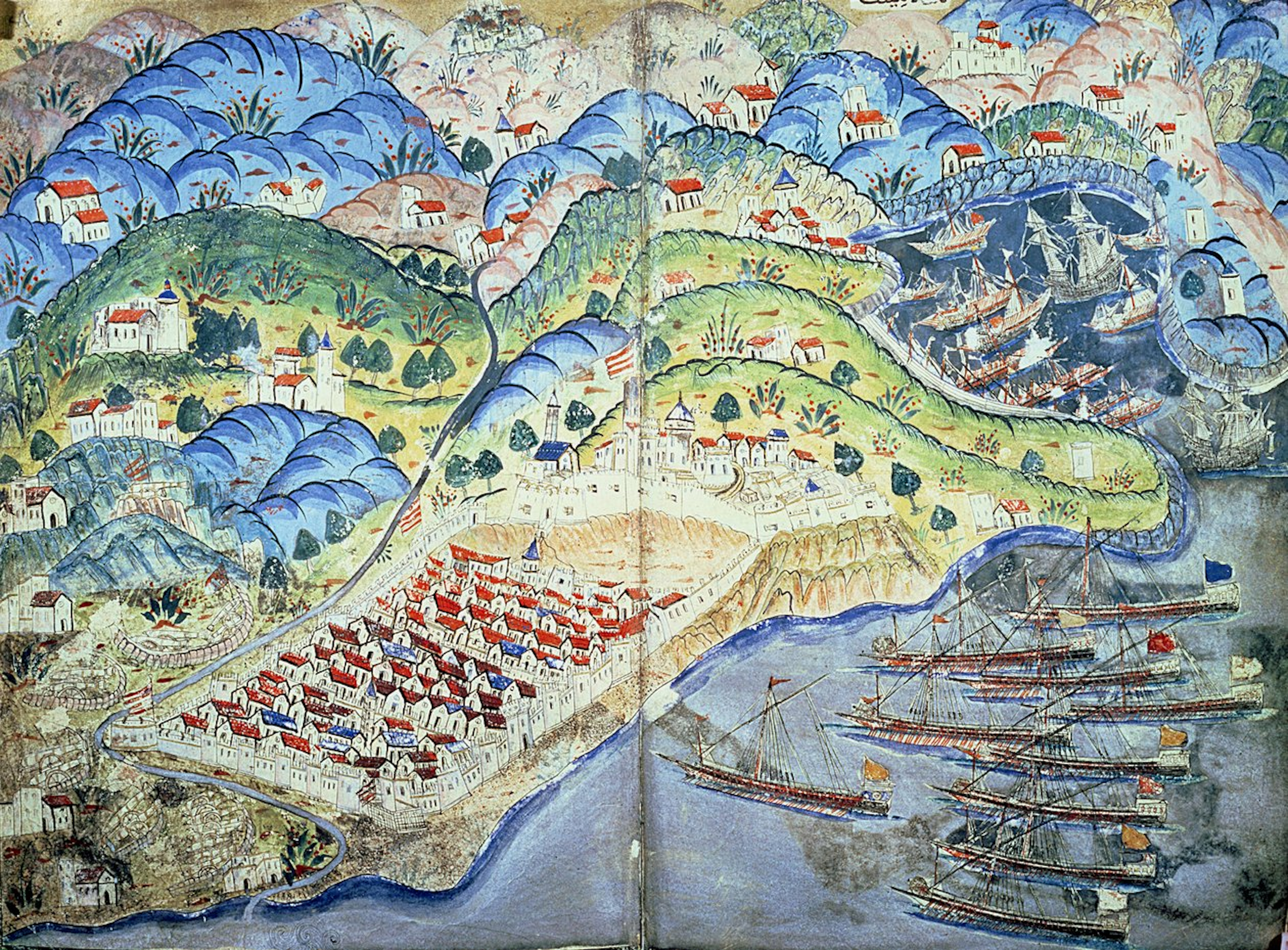
Miniature depicting the Siege of Nice, France (1543) by Matrakçı Nasuh

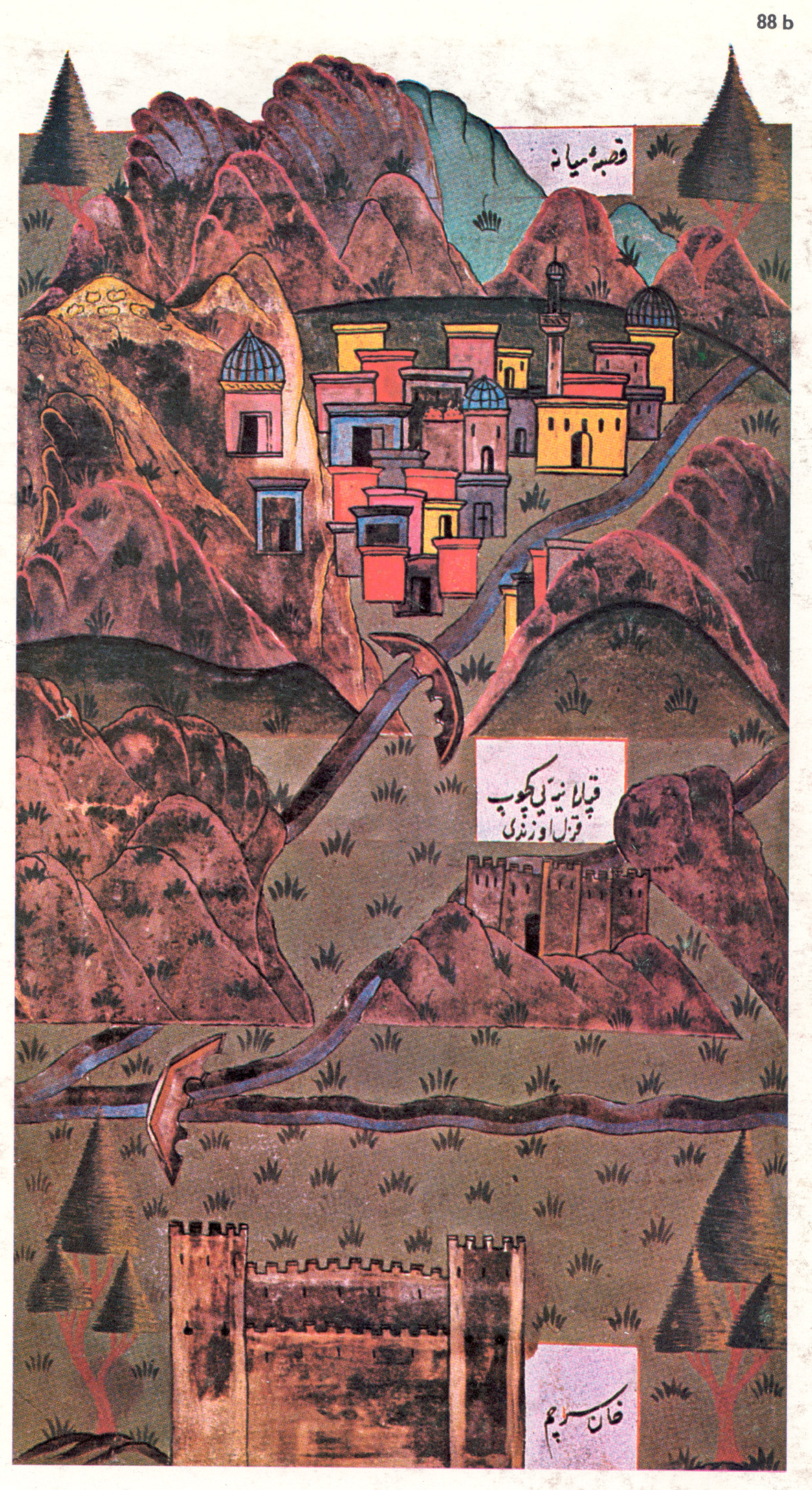
16th century map of Miyaneh by Matrakçı Nasuh

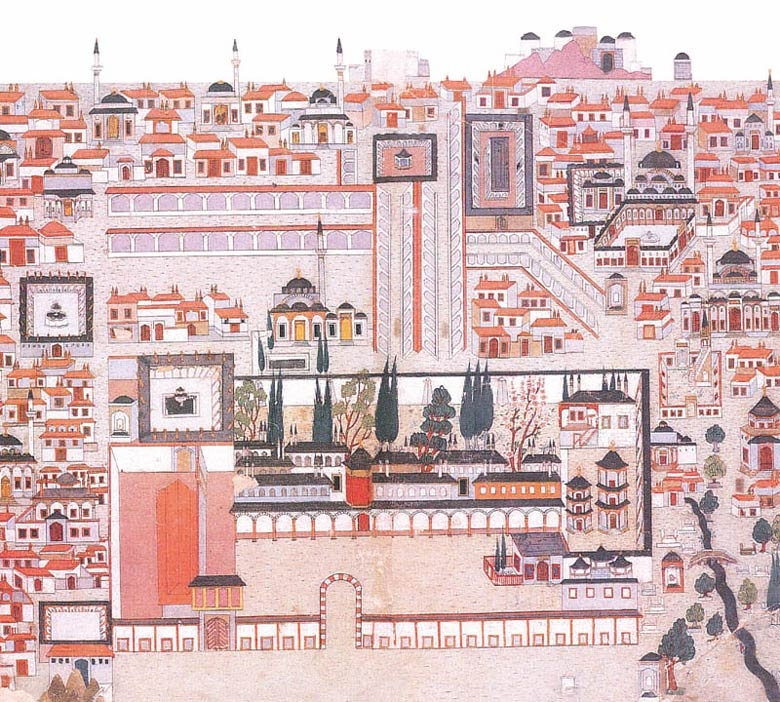
The city of Manisa, with the Manisa Palace built by Sultan Murad II

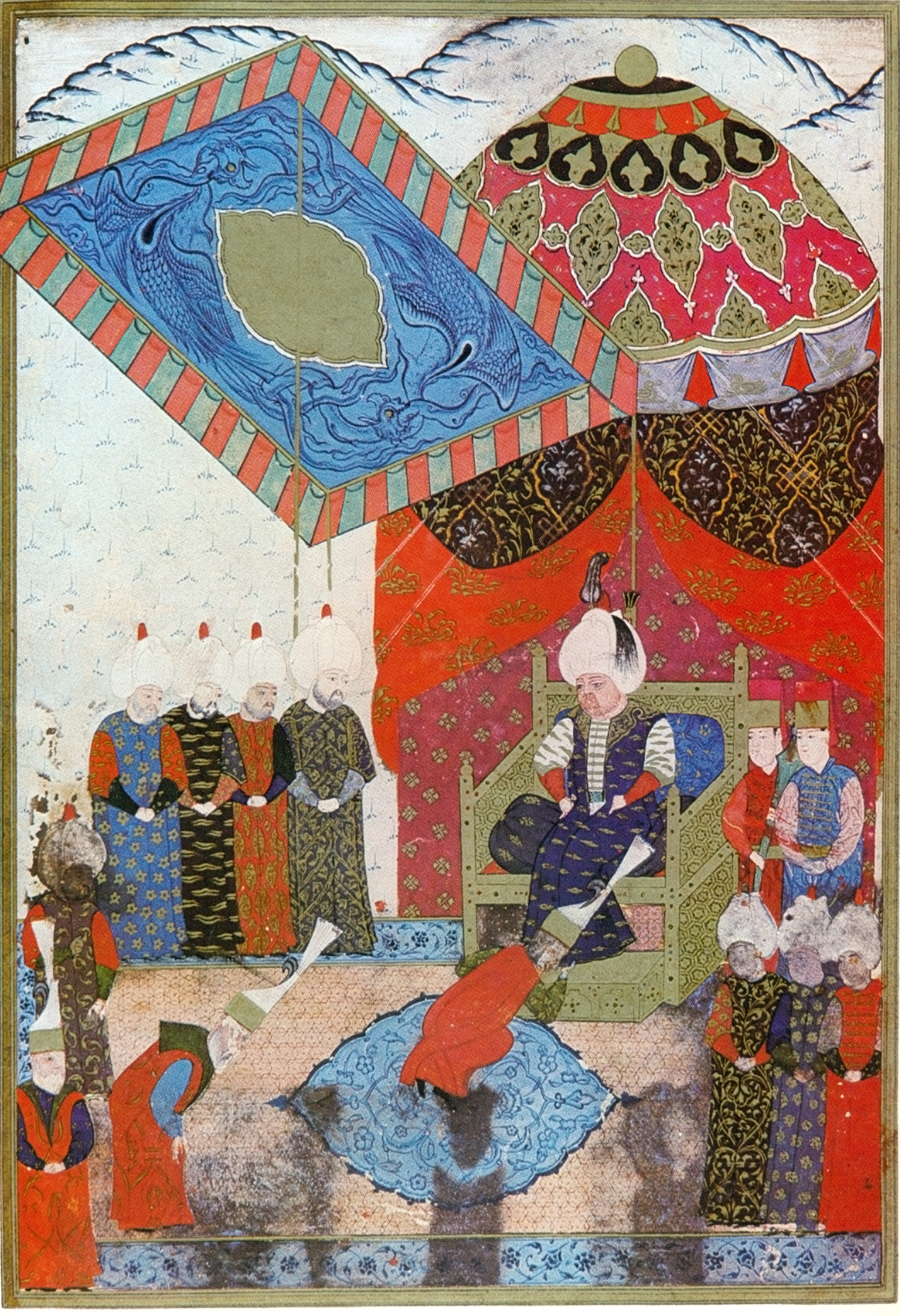
Selim II ascends to the throne

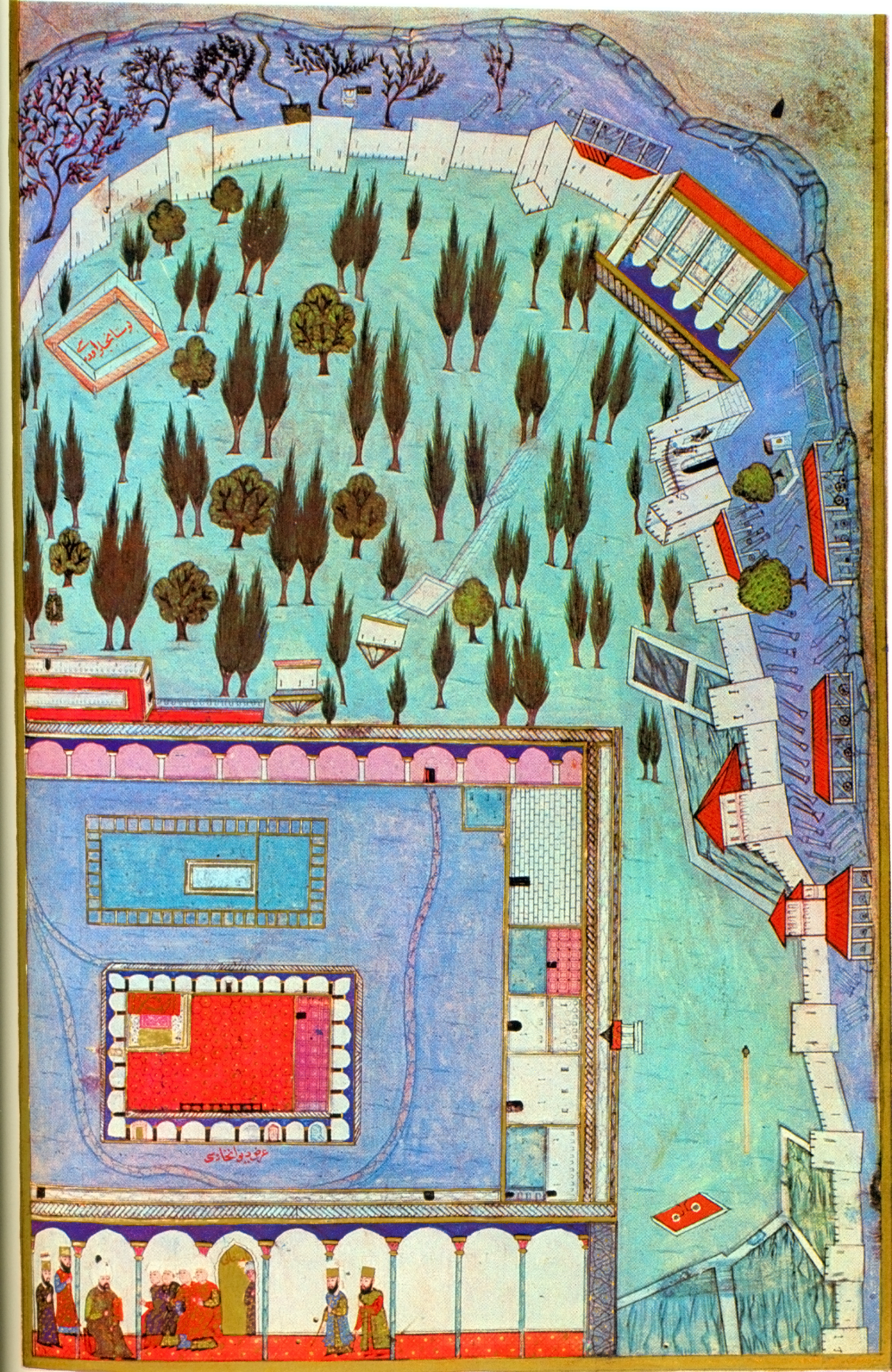
Topkapı Palace during the reign of Selim I

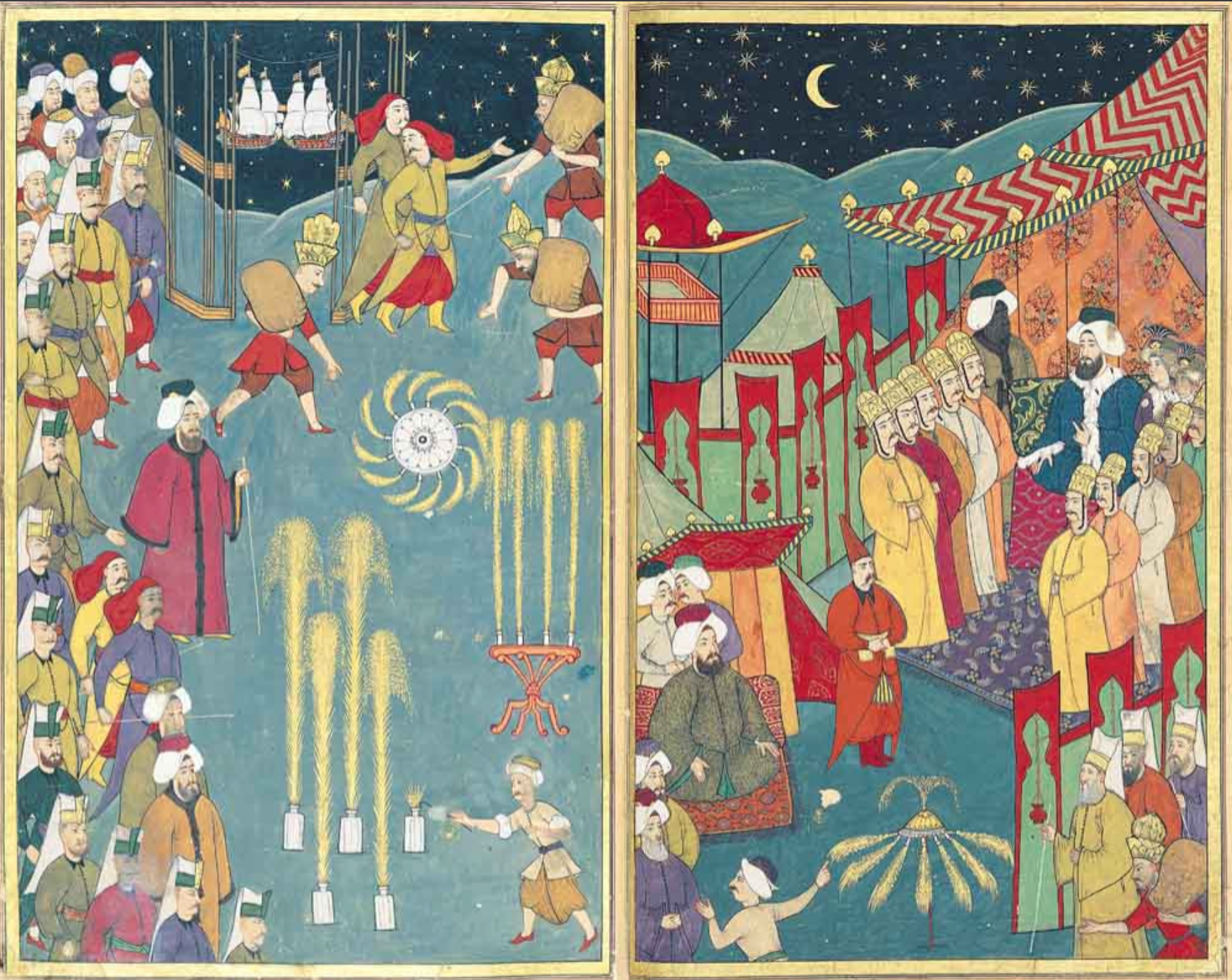
Use of fireworks during the celebrations.

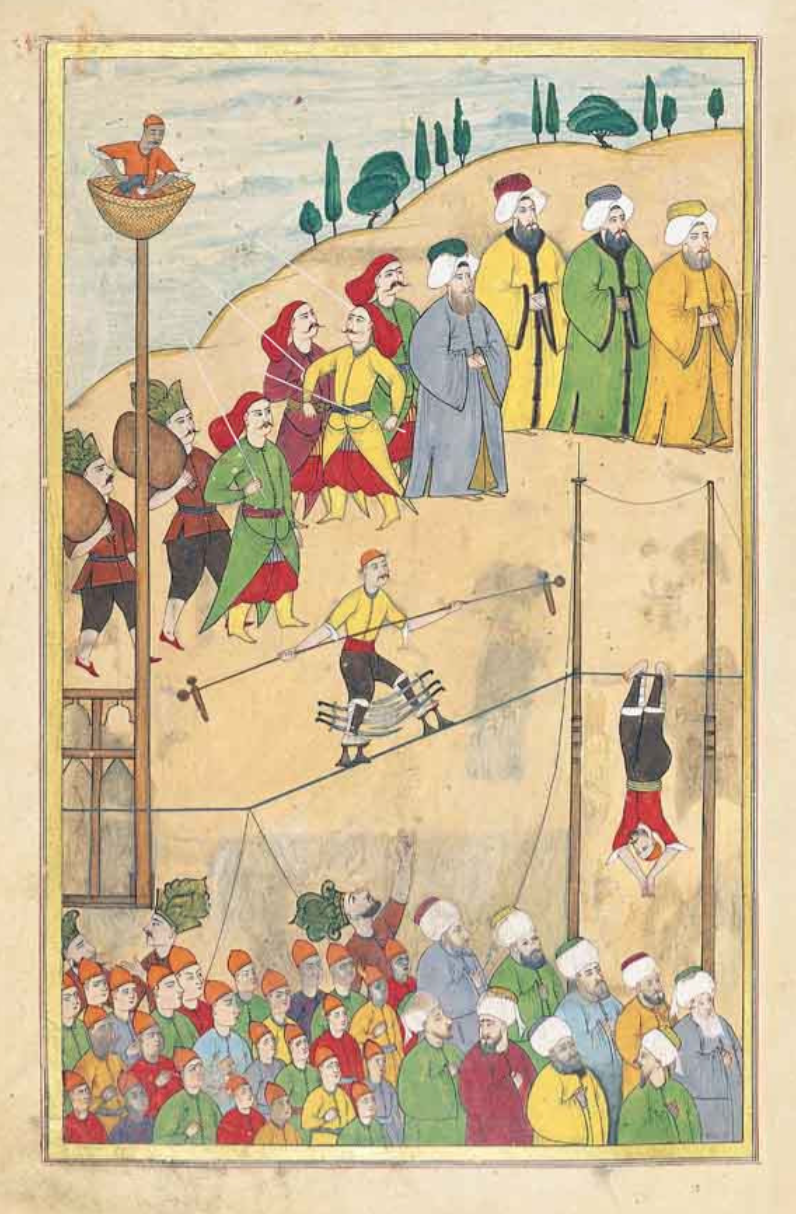
Acrobats during celebrations

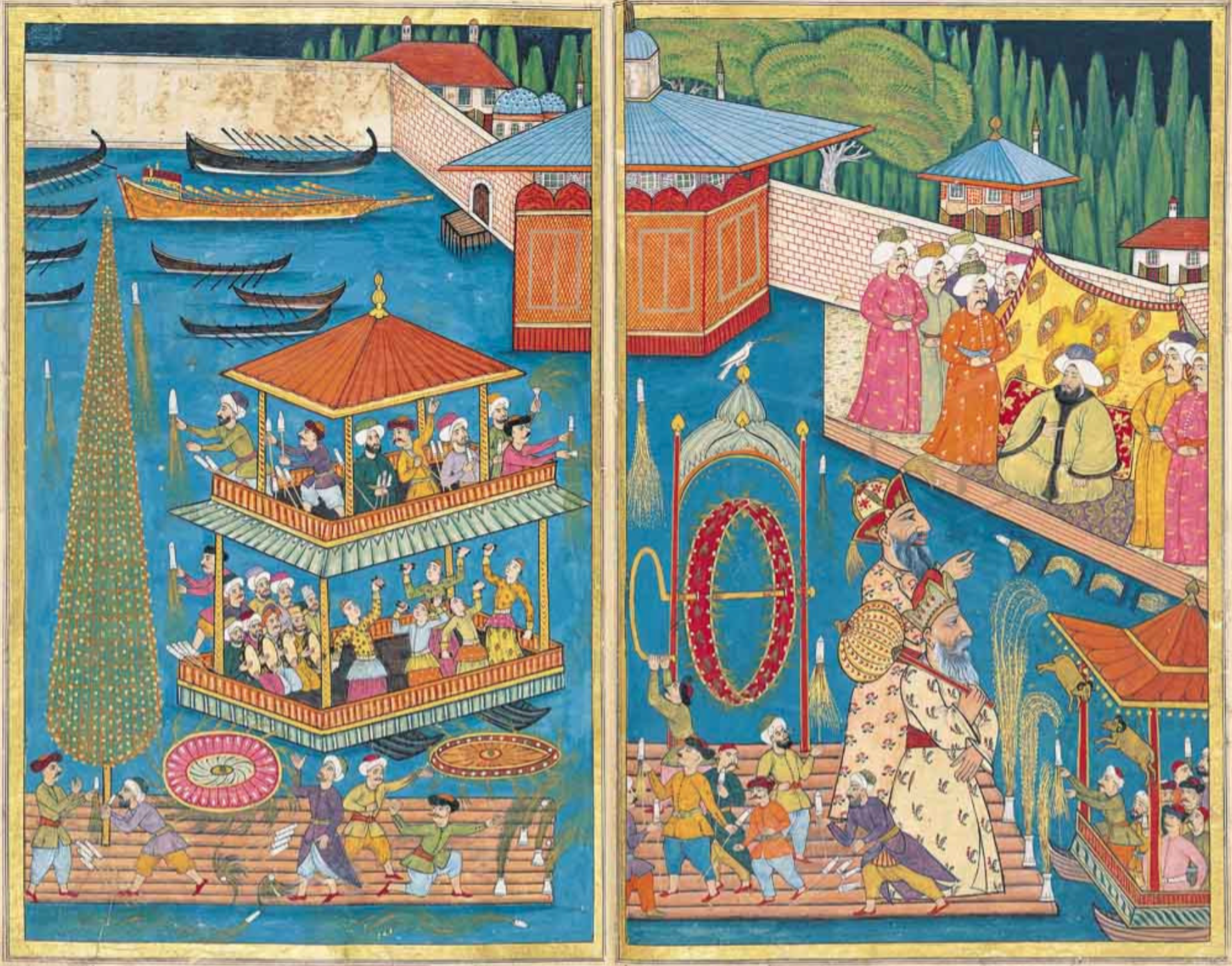
Ships of parade

=== Painting ===
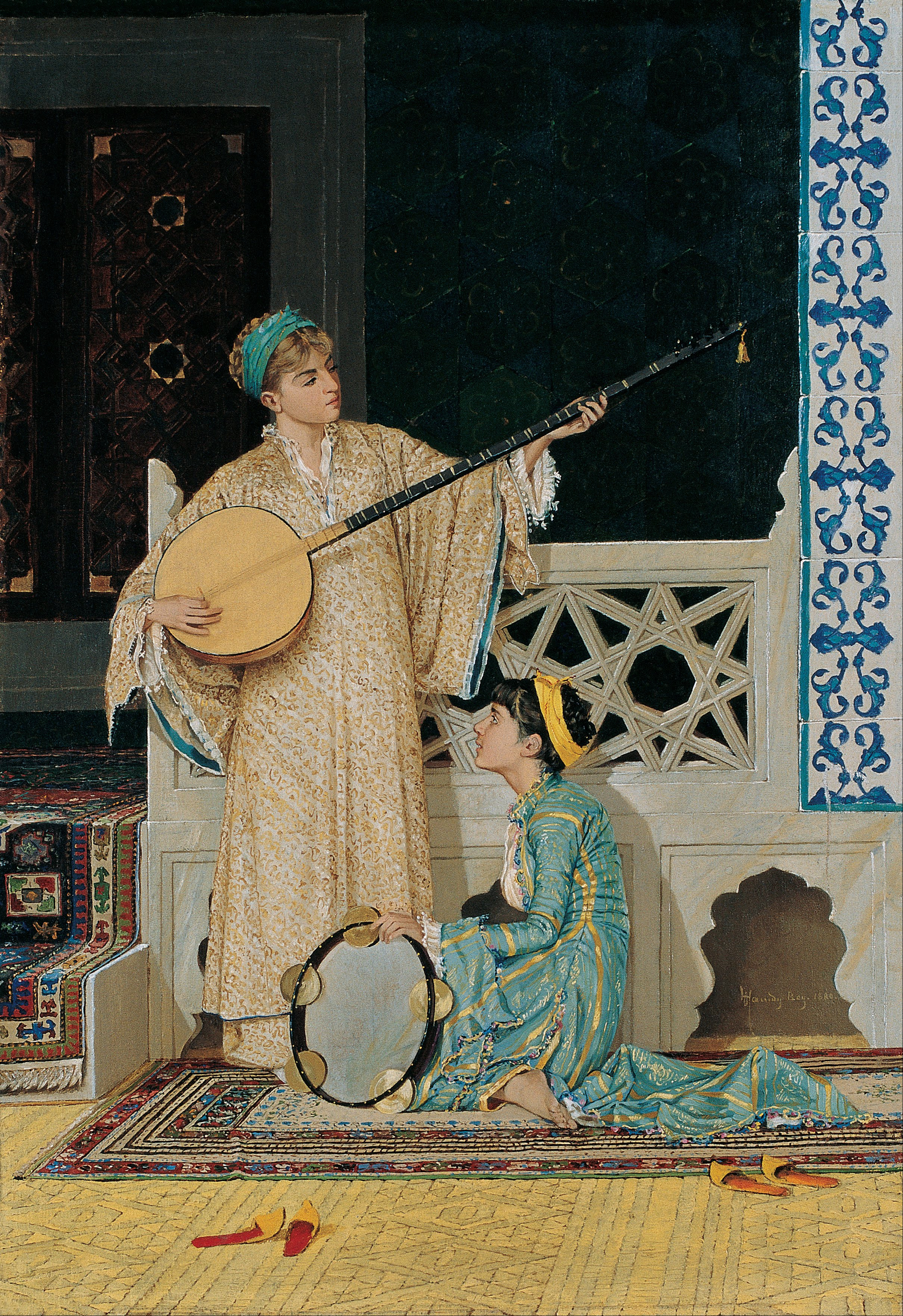
Two Musician Girls by Osman Hamdi Bey

The Tortoise Trainer by Osman Hamdi Bey, 1906

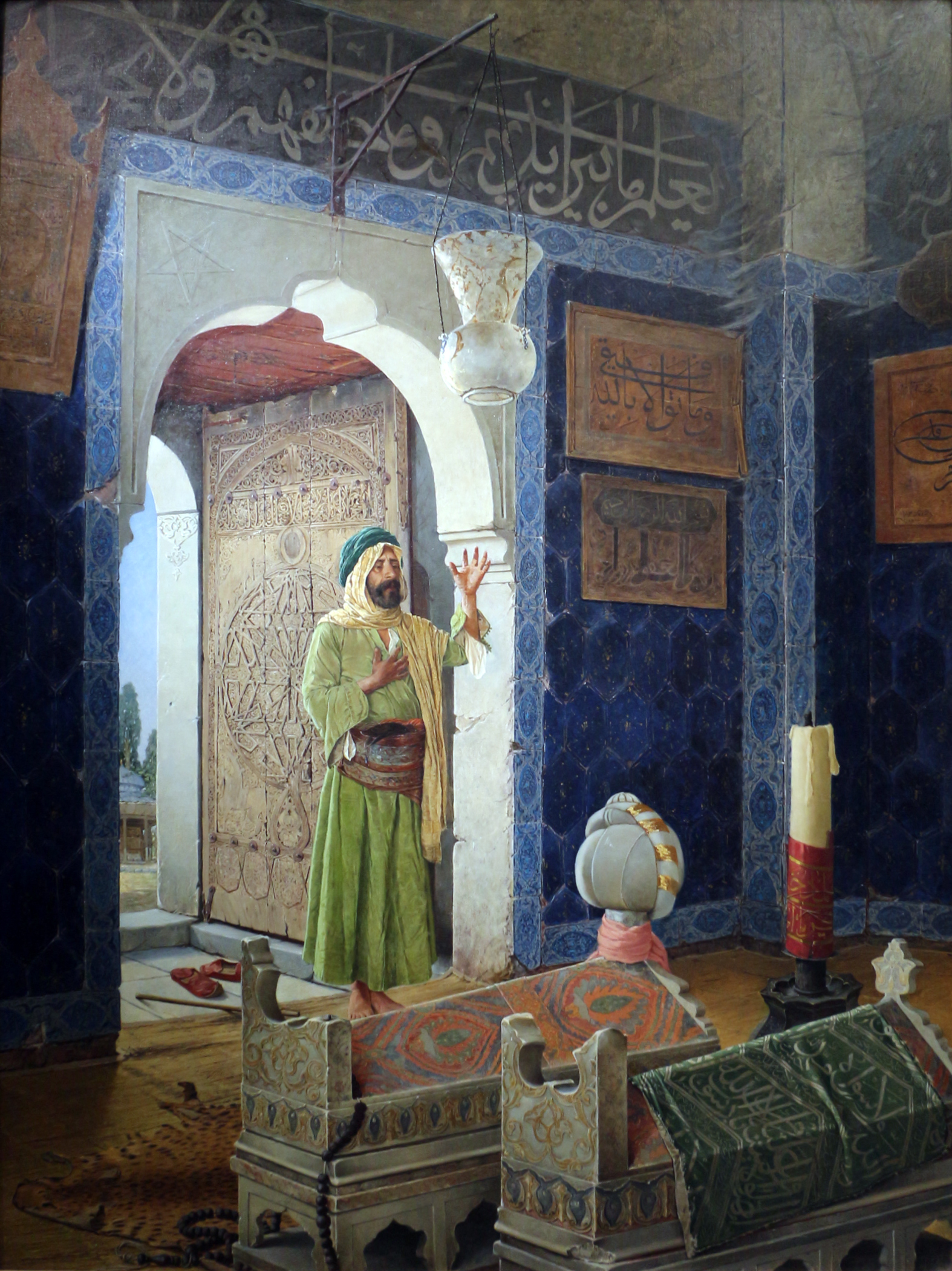
Work by Osman Hamdi Bey

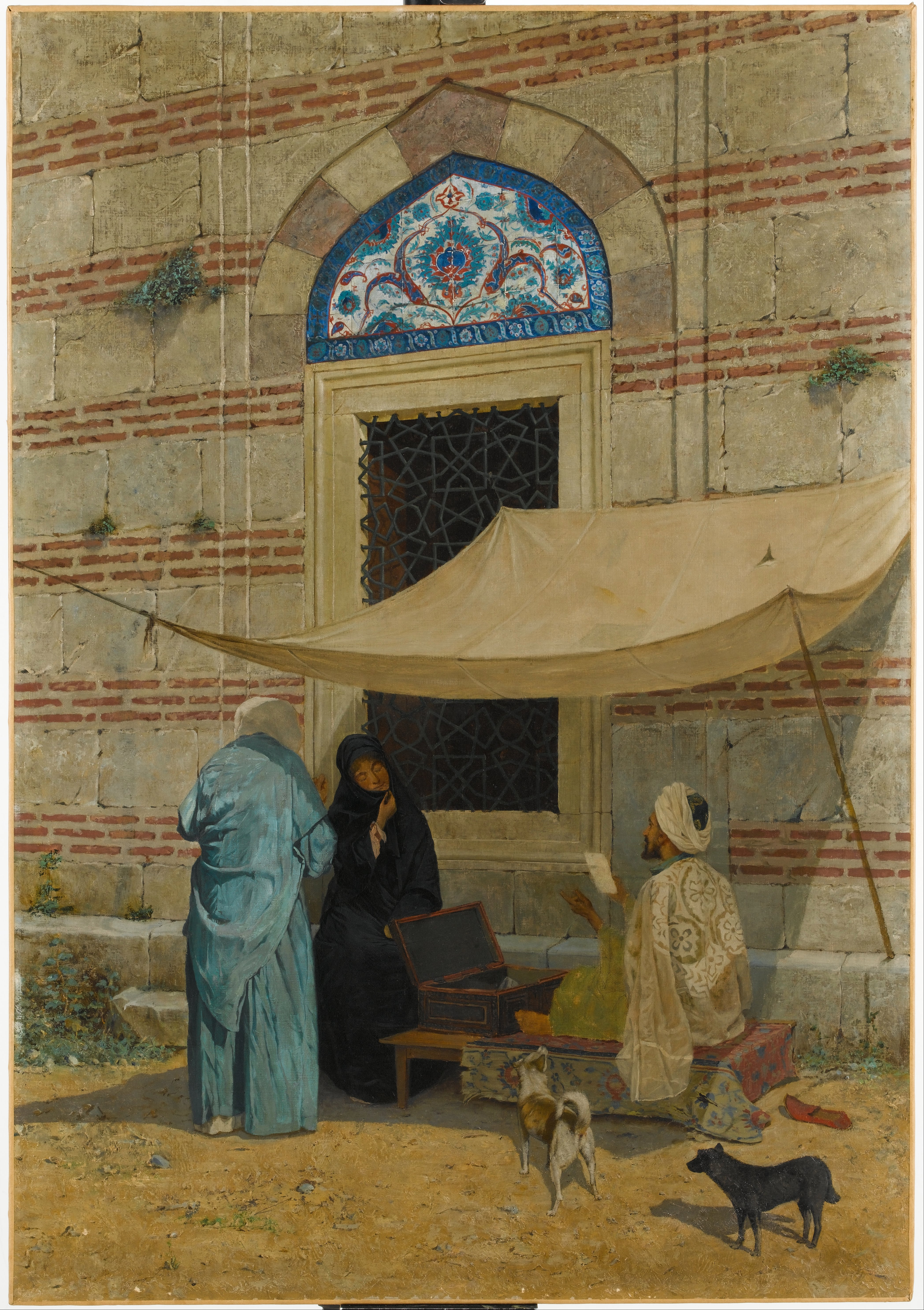
Arzuhalci by Osman Hamdi Bey

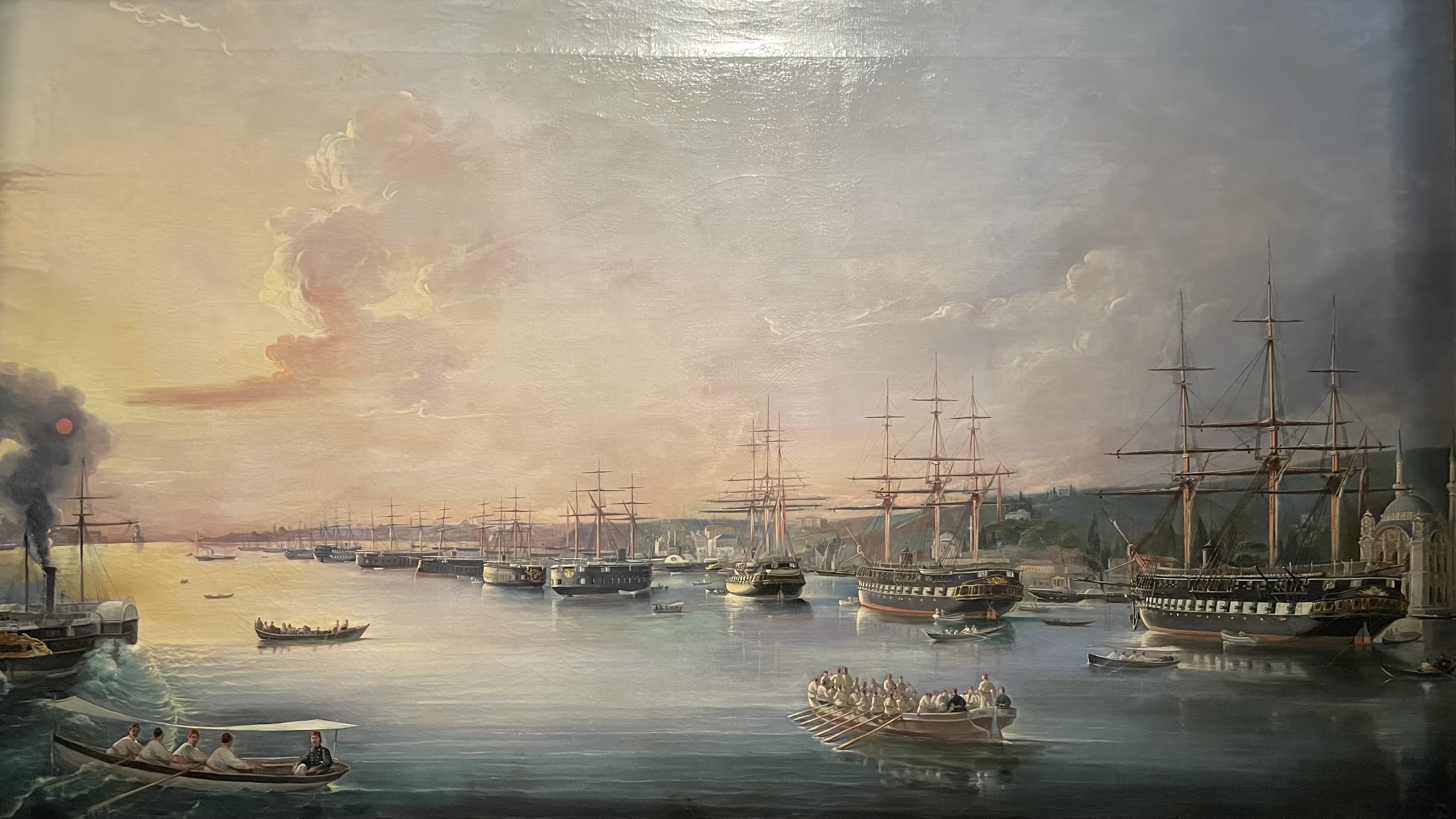
Ottoman Navy at Ortaköy in Painting Museum of Dolmabahçe Palace

=== Sculpture ===
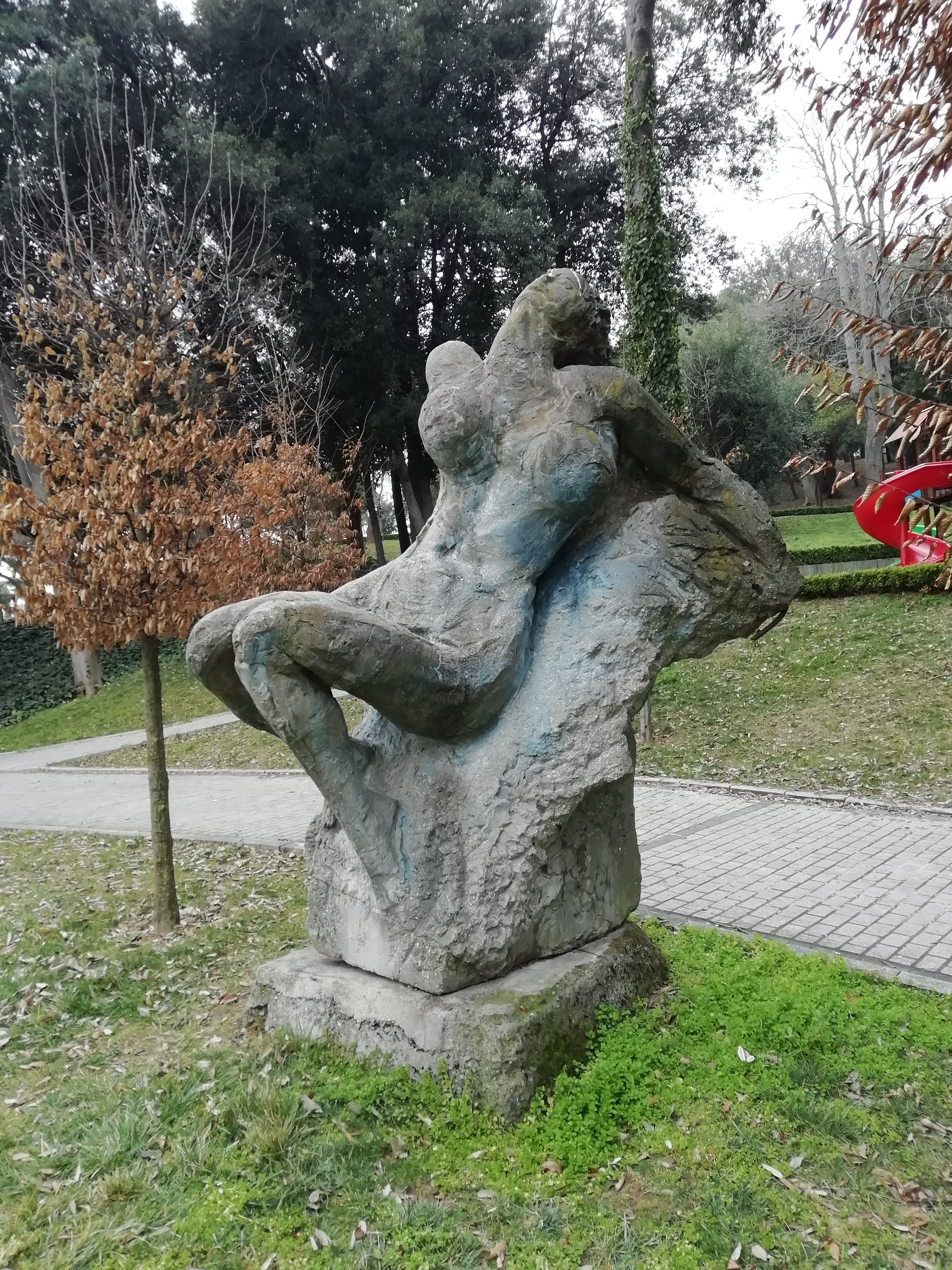
Güzel İstanbul by Gürdal Duyar

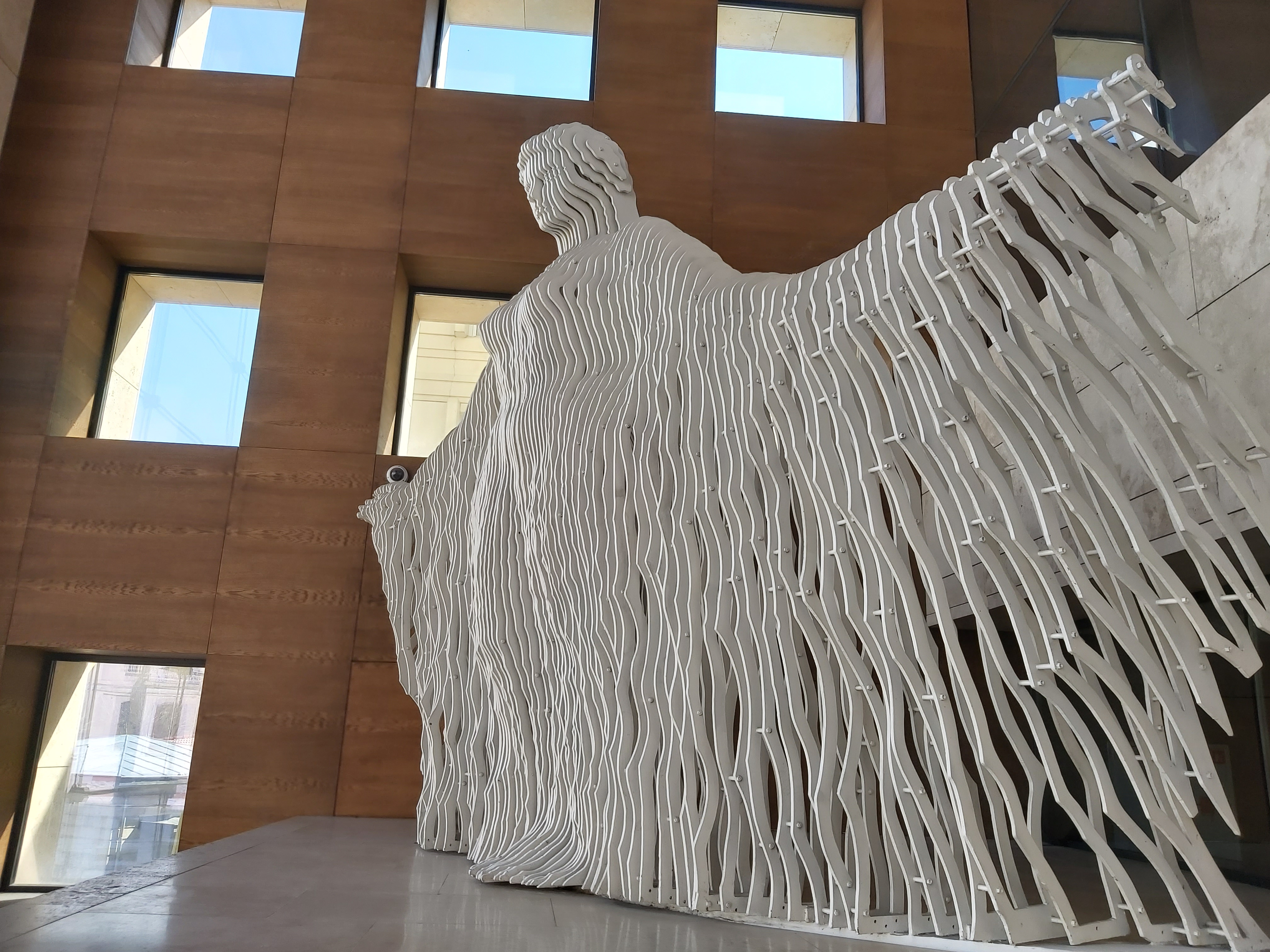
Akdeniz by İlhan Koman

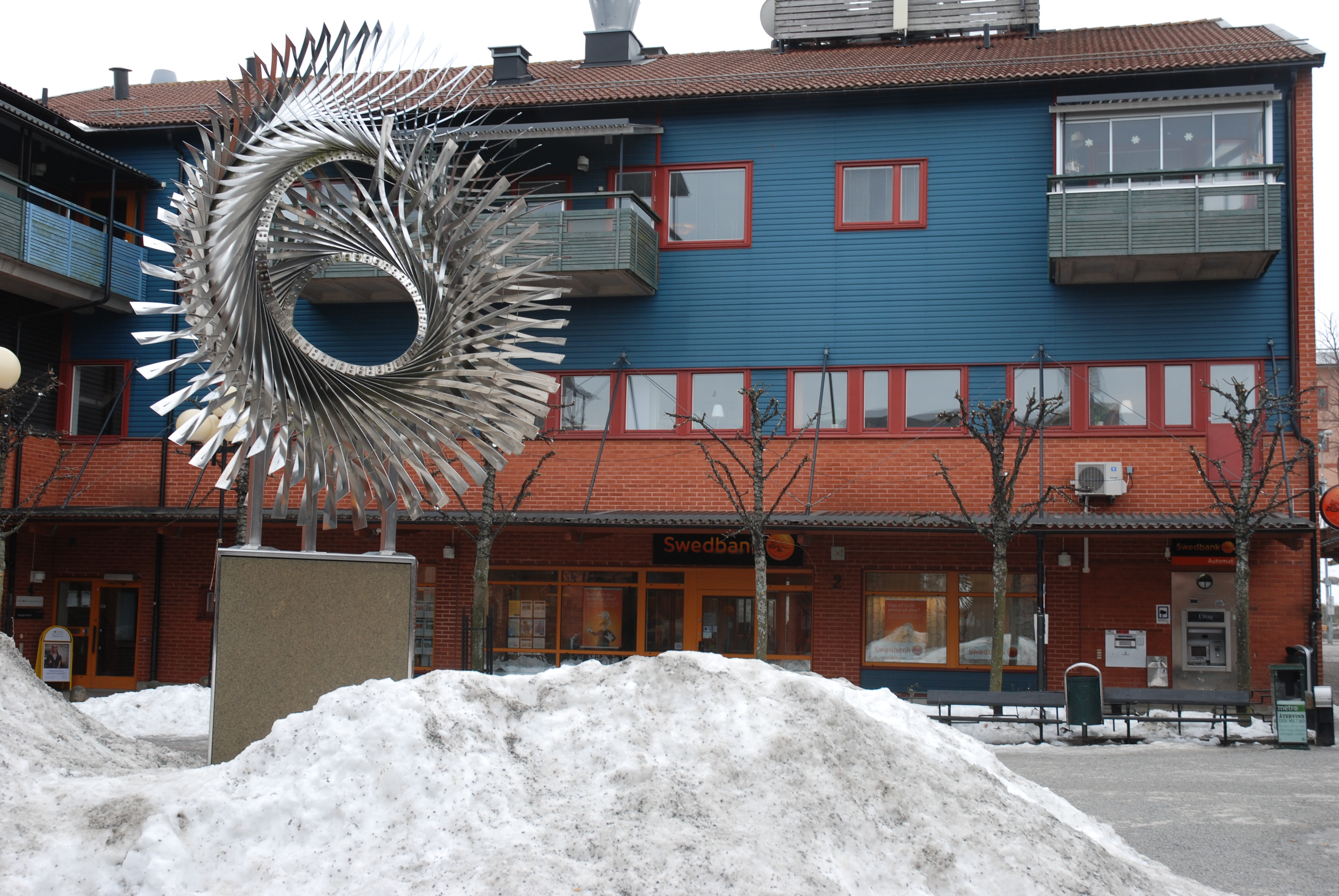
Water Swirl by İlhan Koman

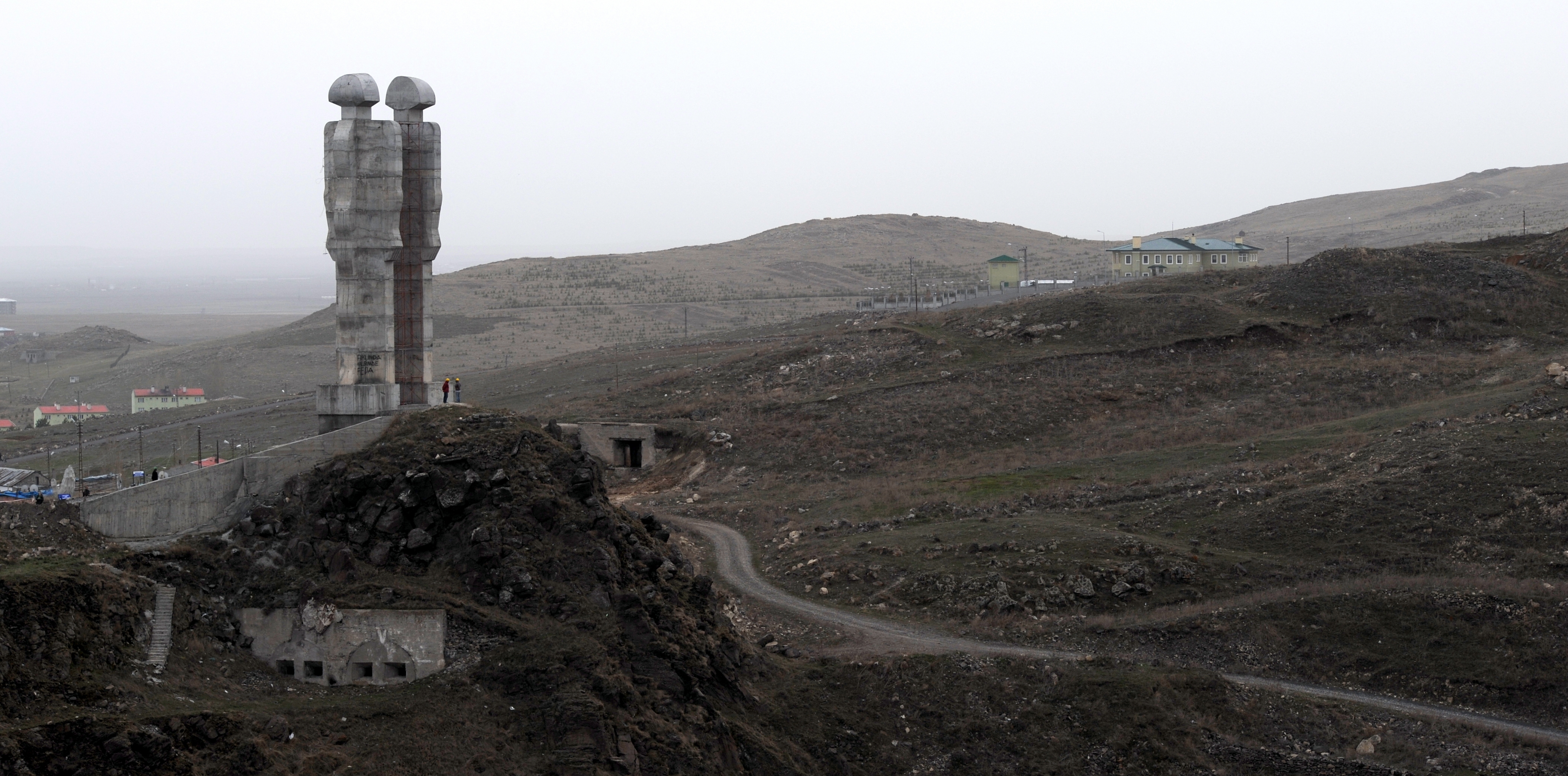
Statue of Humanity by Mehmet Aksoy

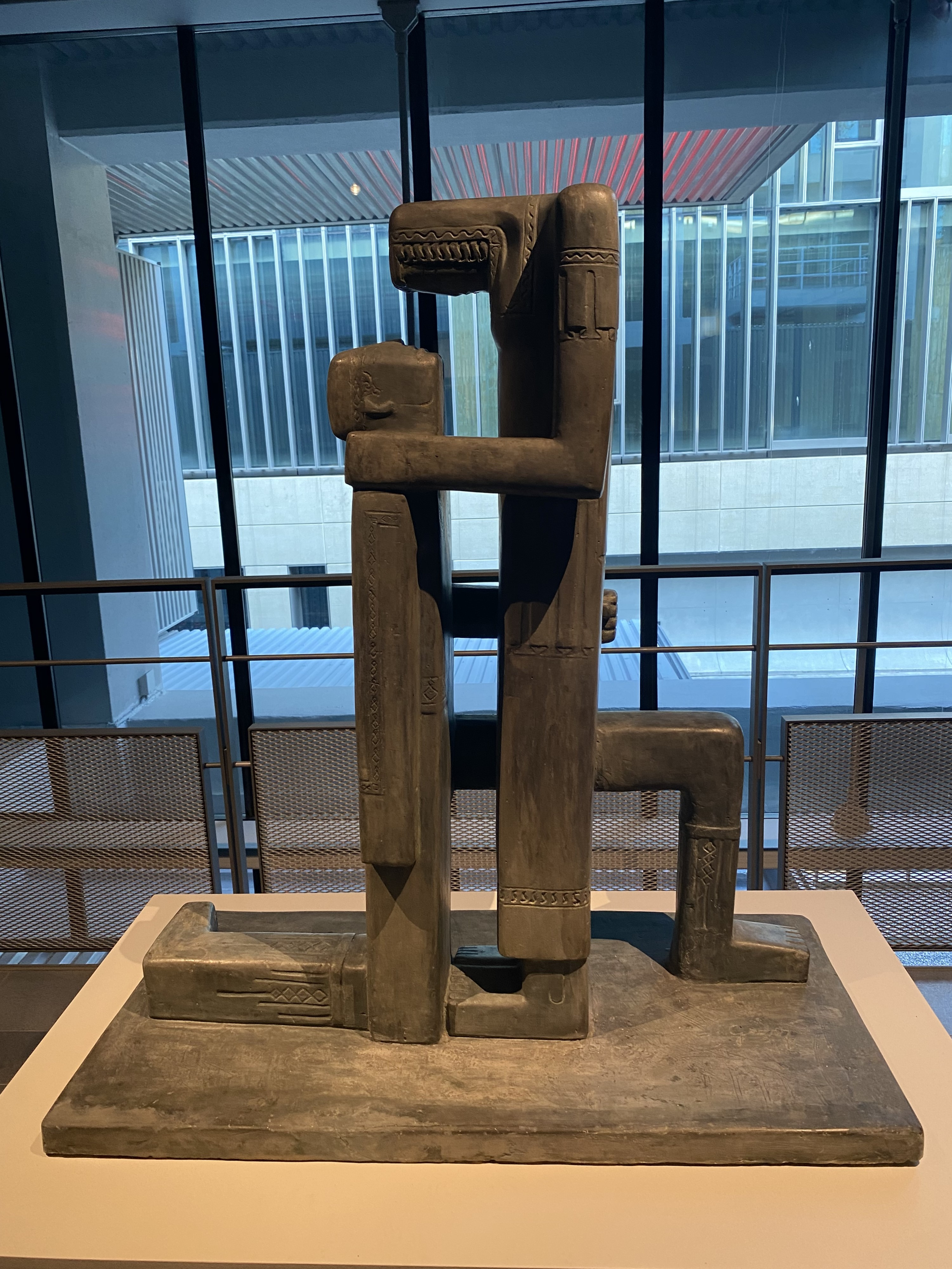
Efenin Aşkı by Hüseyin Gezer

=== Tiles ===
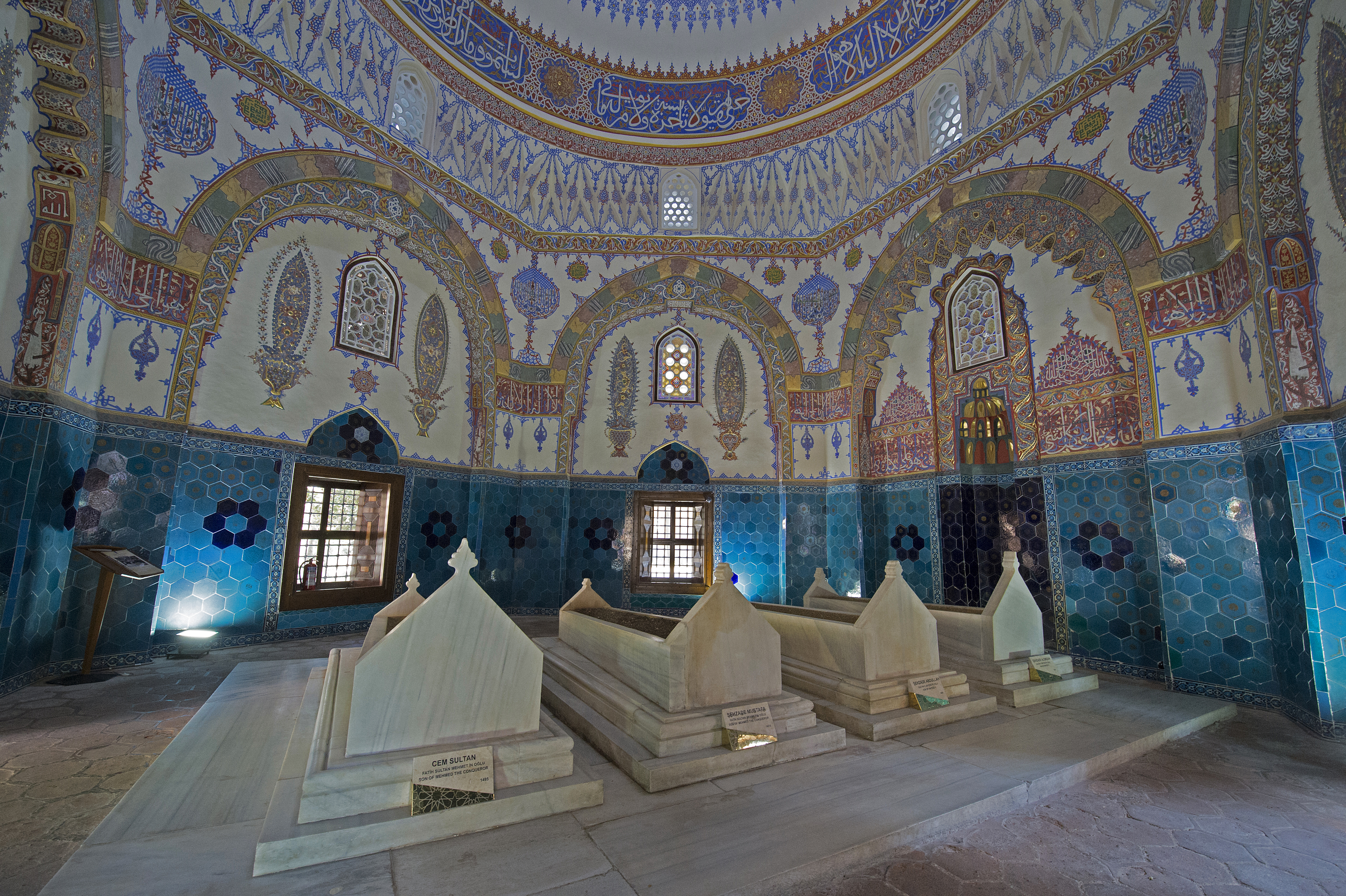
Cem Sultan tomb in Bursa, the first official capital of the Ottoman Empire

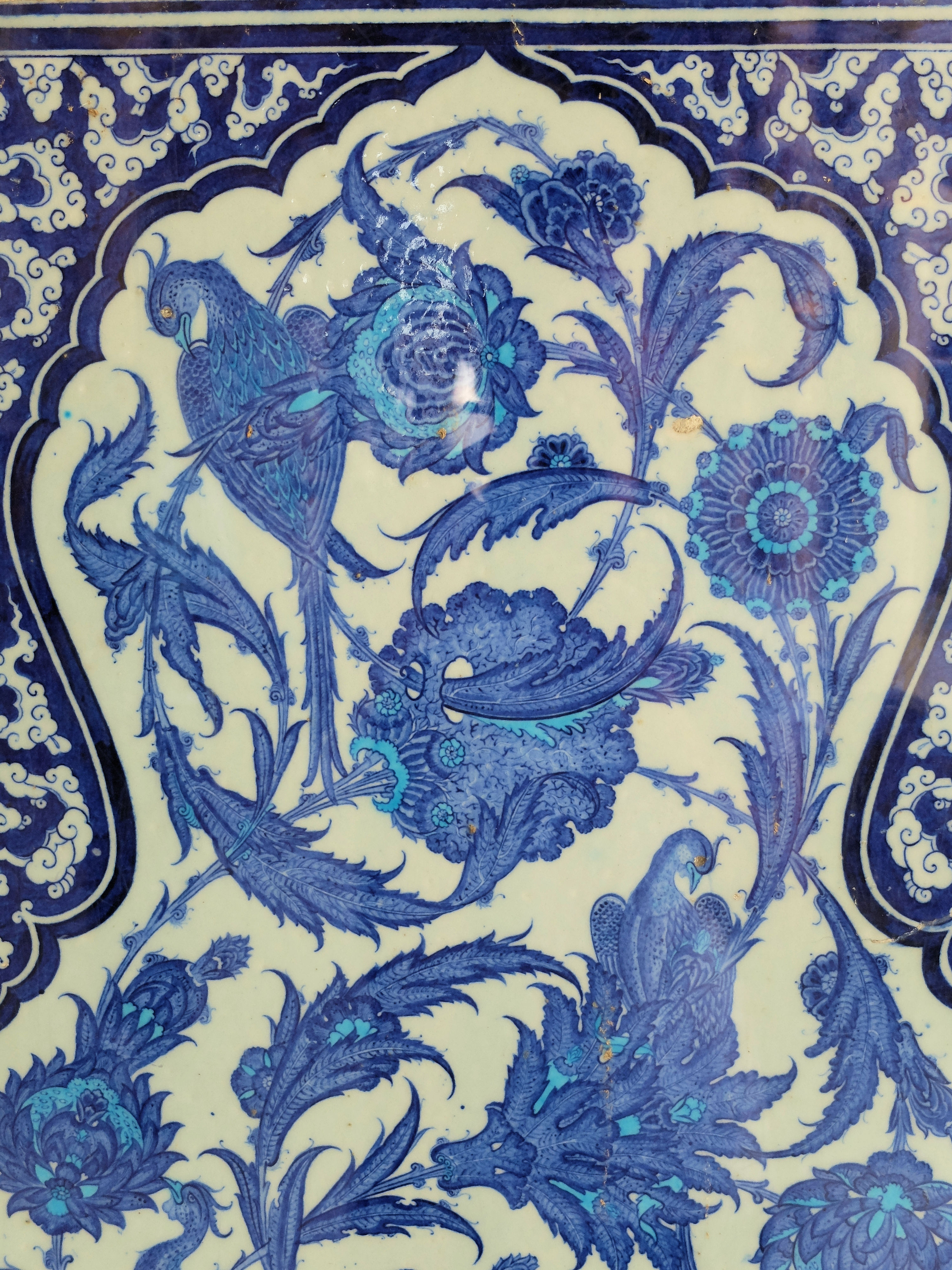
Tiles of the circumcision room at Topkapi Palace

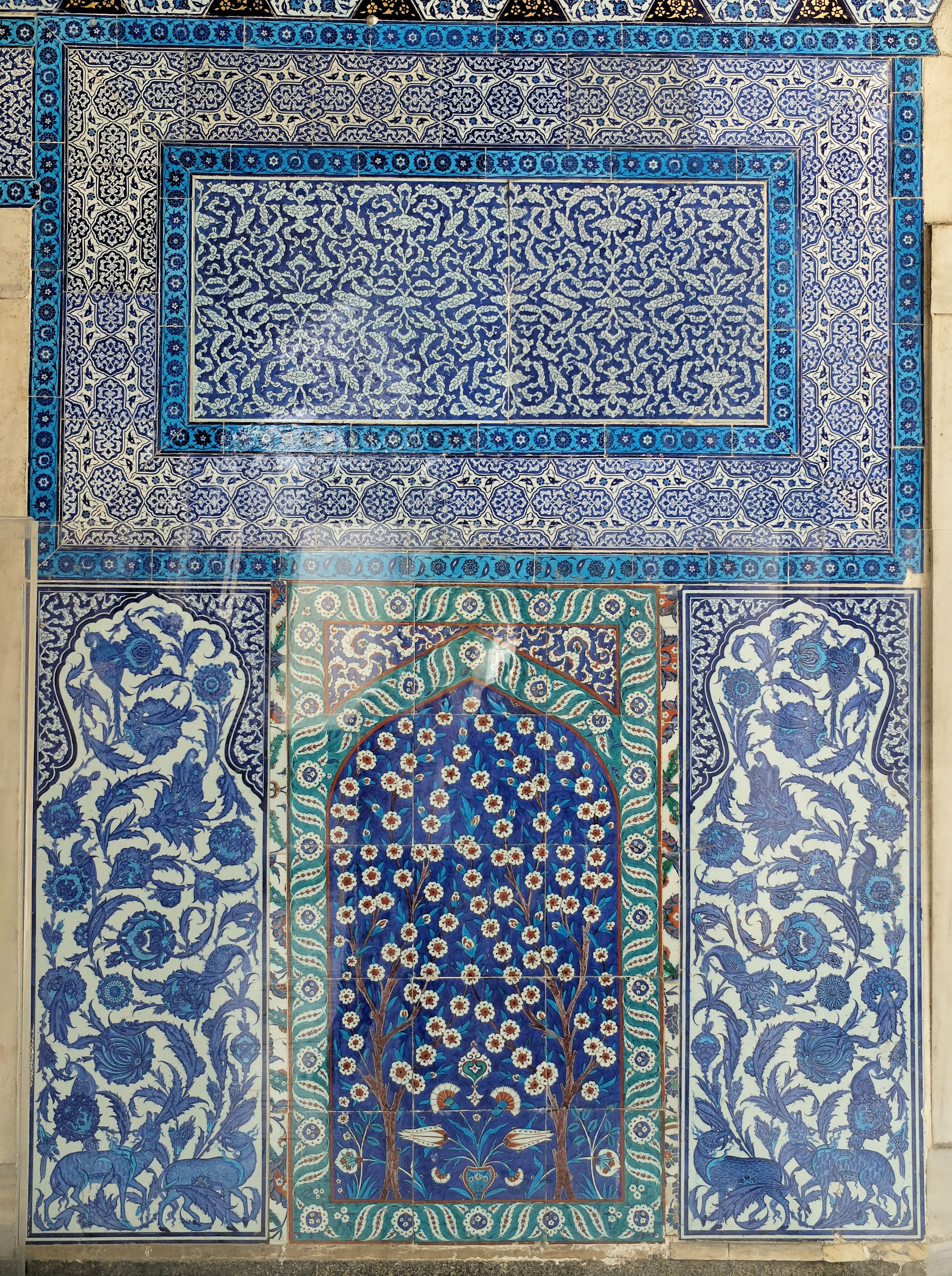
Tiles of the circumcision room at Topkapi Palace

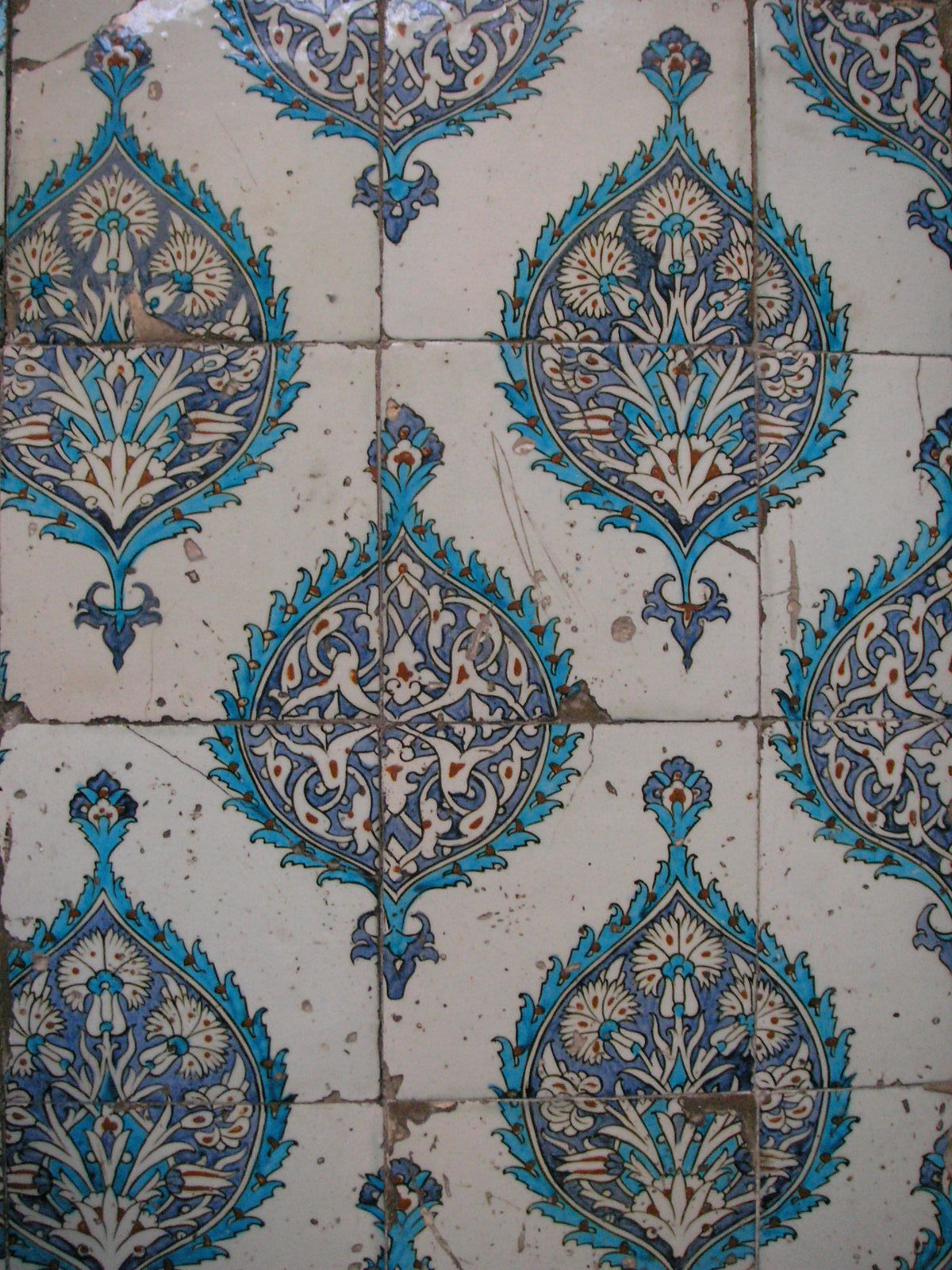
The entrance to the Harem at Topkapi Palace

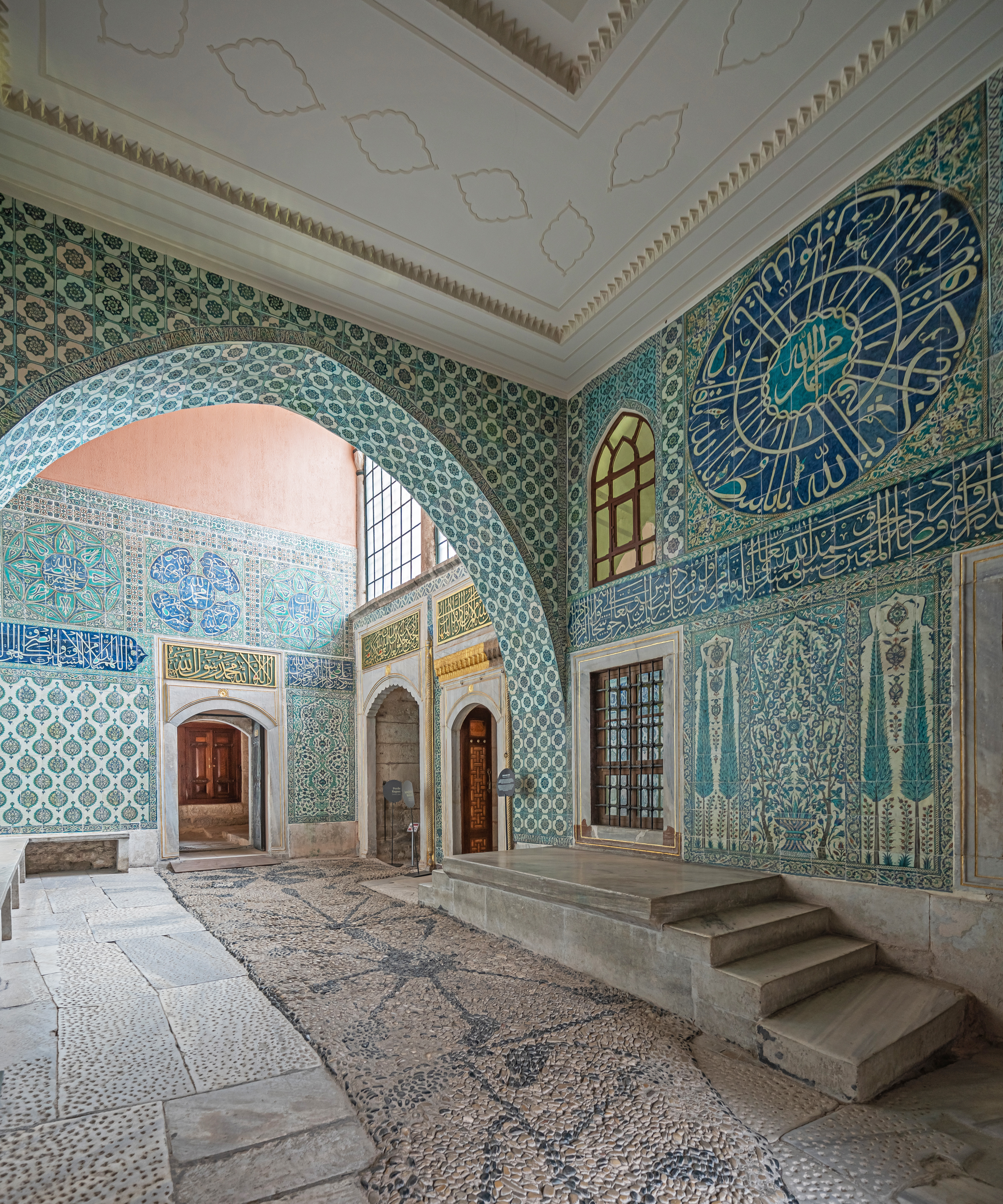
Eunuchs' Courtyard in Harem of Topkapı Palace

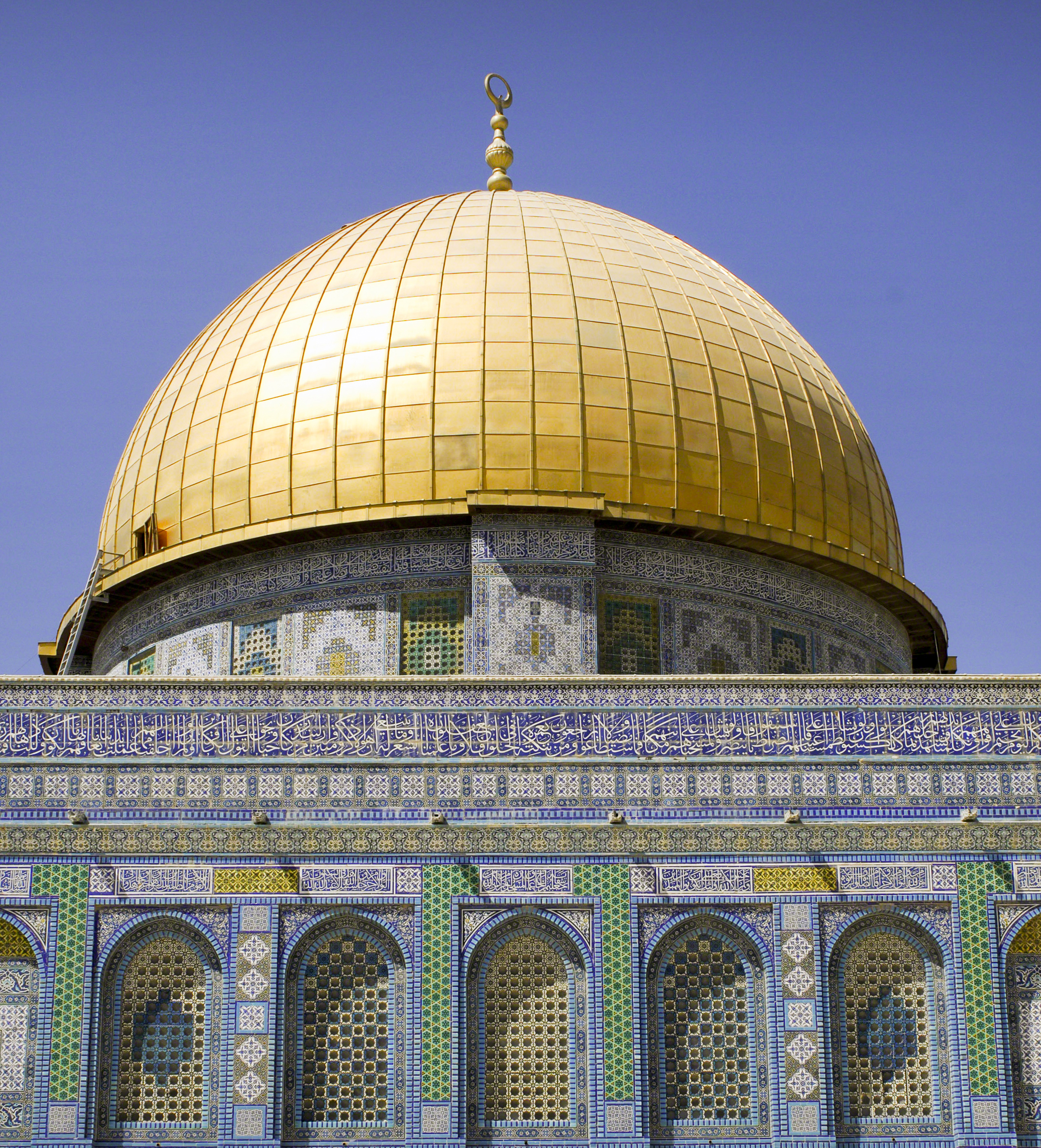
Tile decoration on the Dome of the Rock, added during Sultan Suleiman's reign

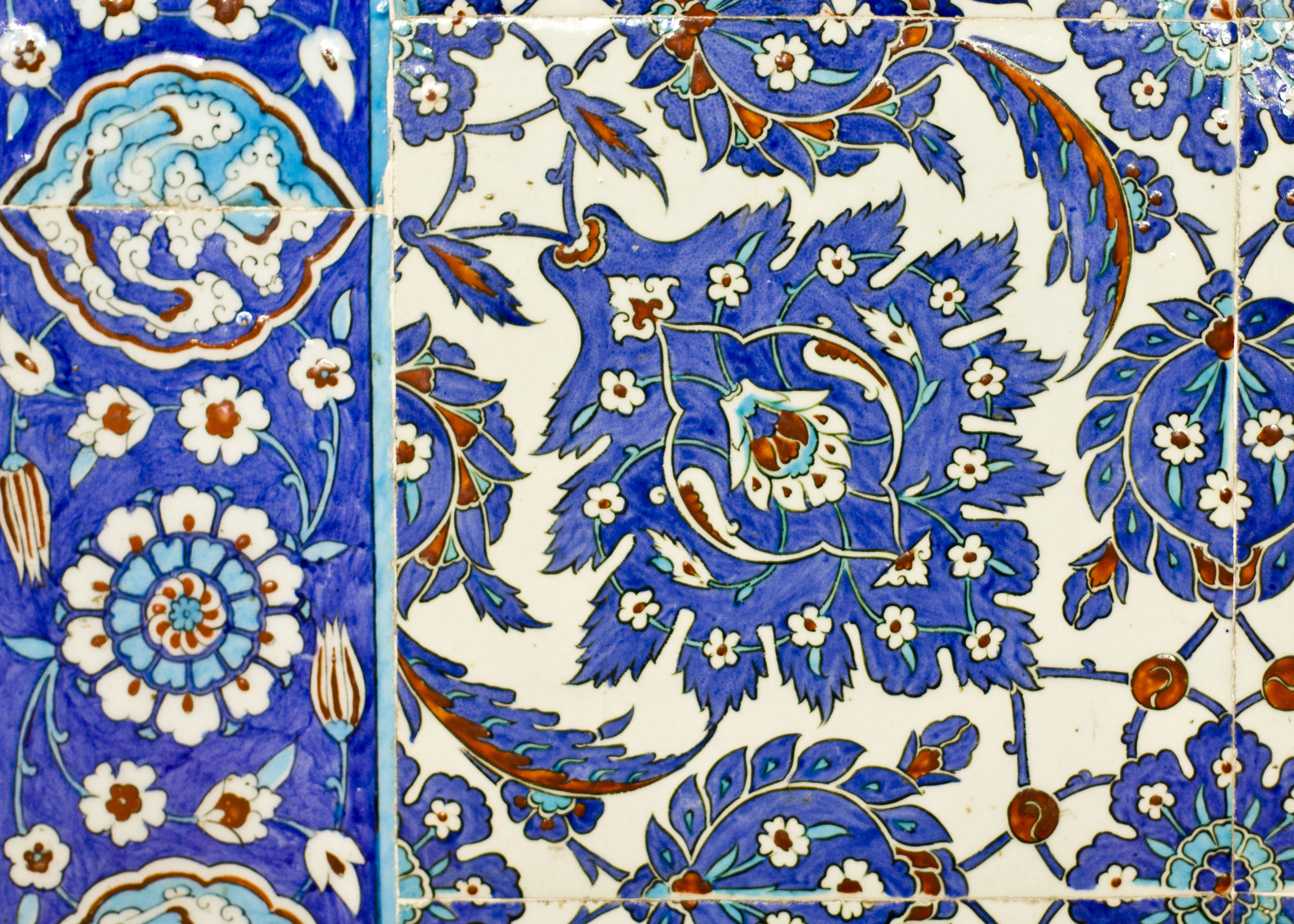
Tiles of the Rüstem Pasha Mosque

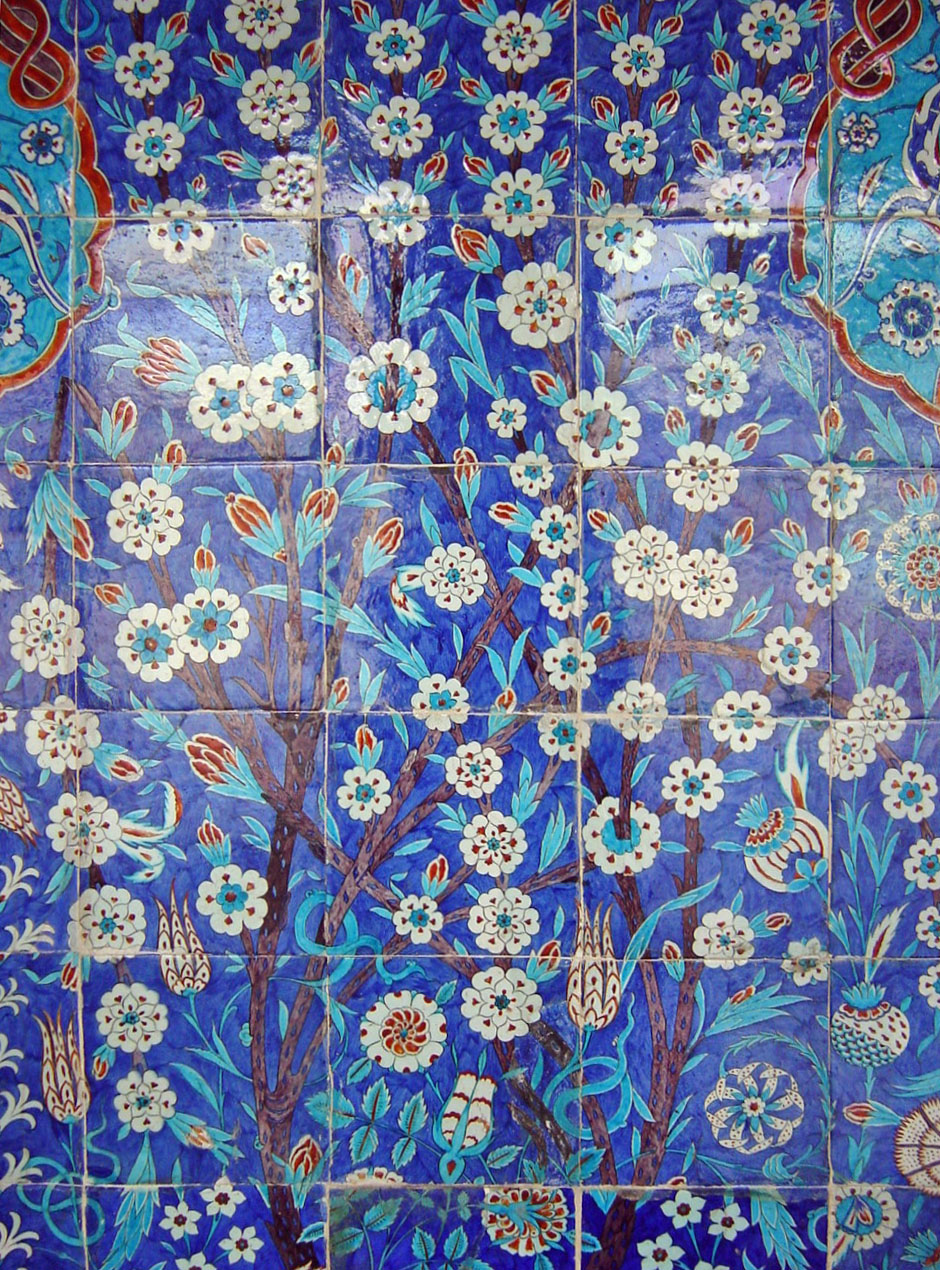
Tiles of the Rüstem Paşa Mosque

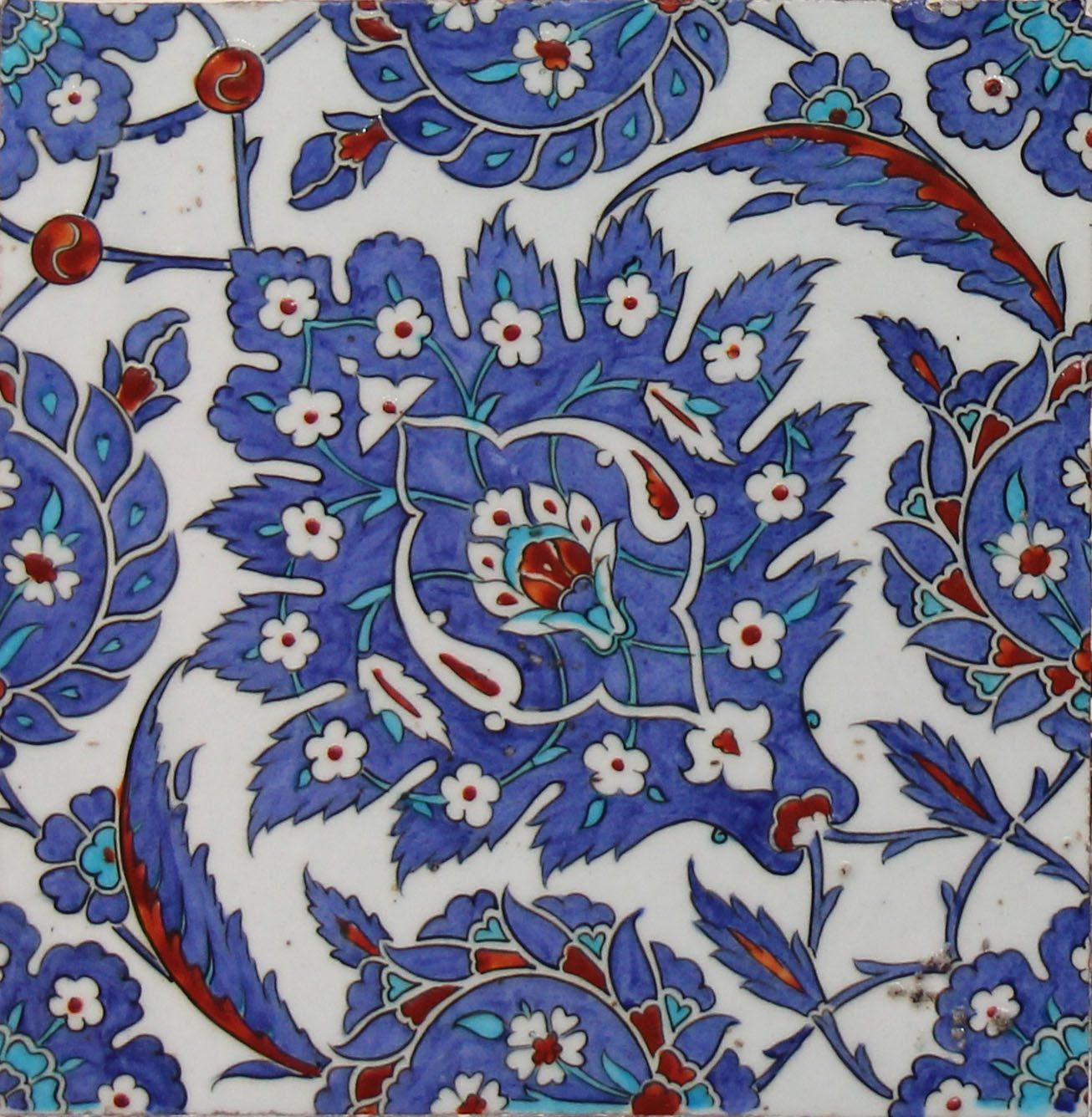
Tiles of the Rüstem Paşa Mosque

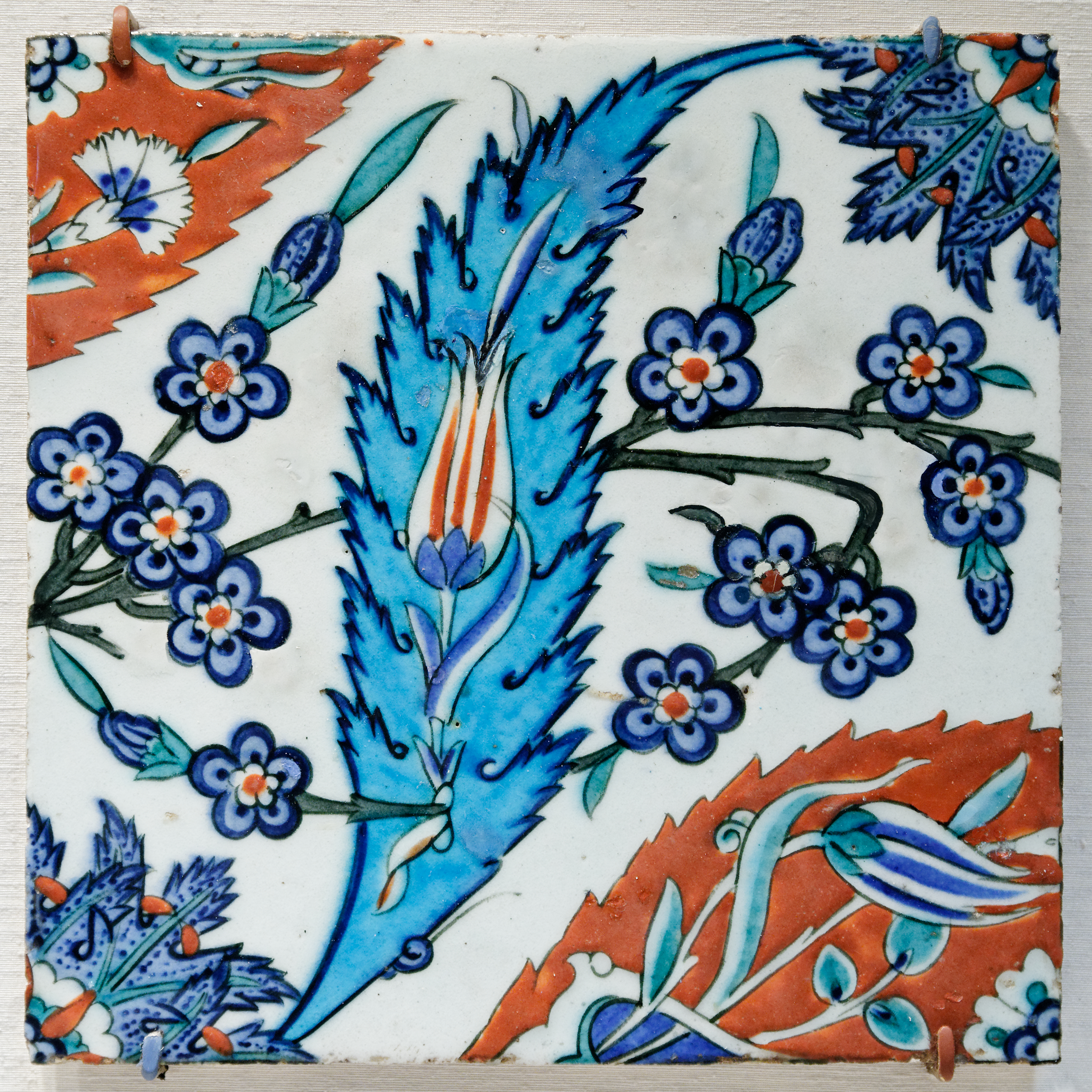
Iznik (ancient Nicea) tiles

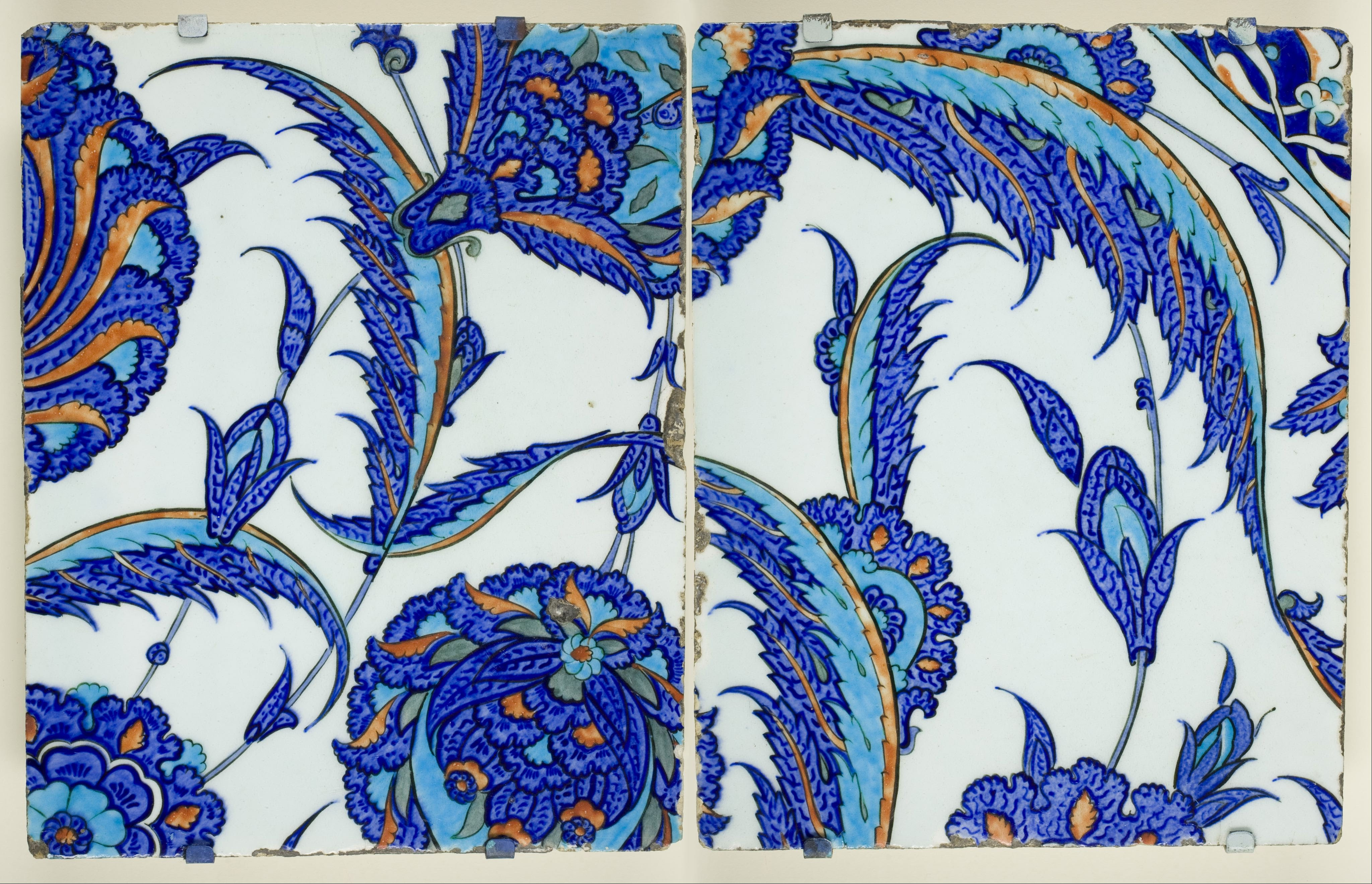
Iznik (ancient Nicea) tiles

Tiles of the Imperial Council Second Courtyard

=== Weapons ===
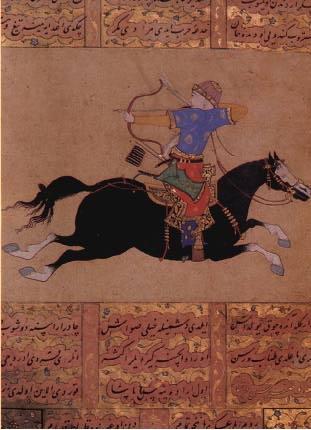
An Ottoman horse archer

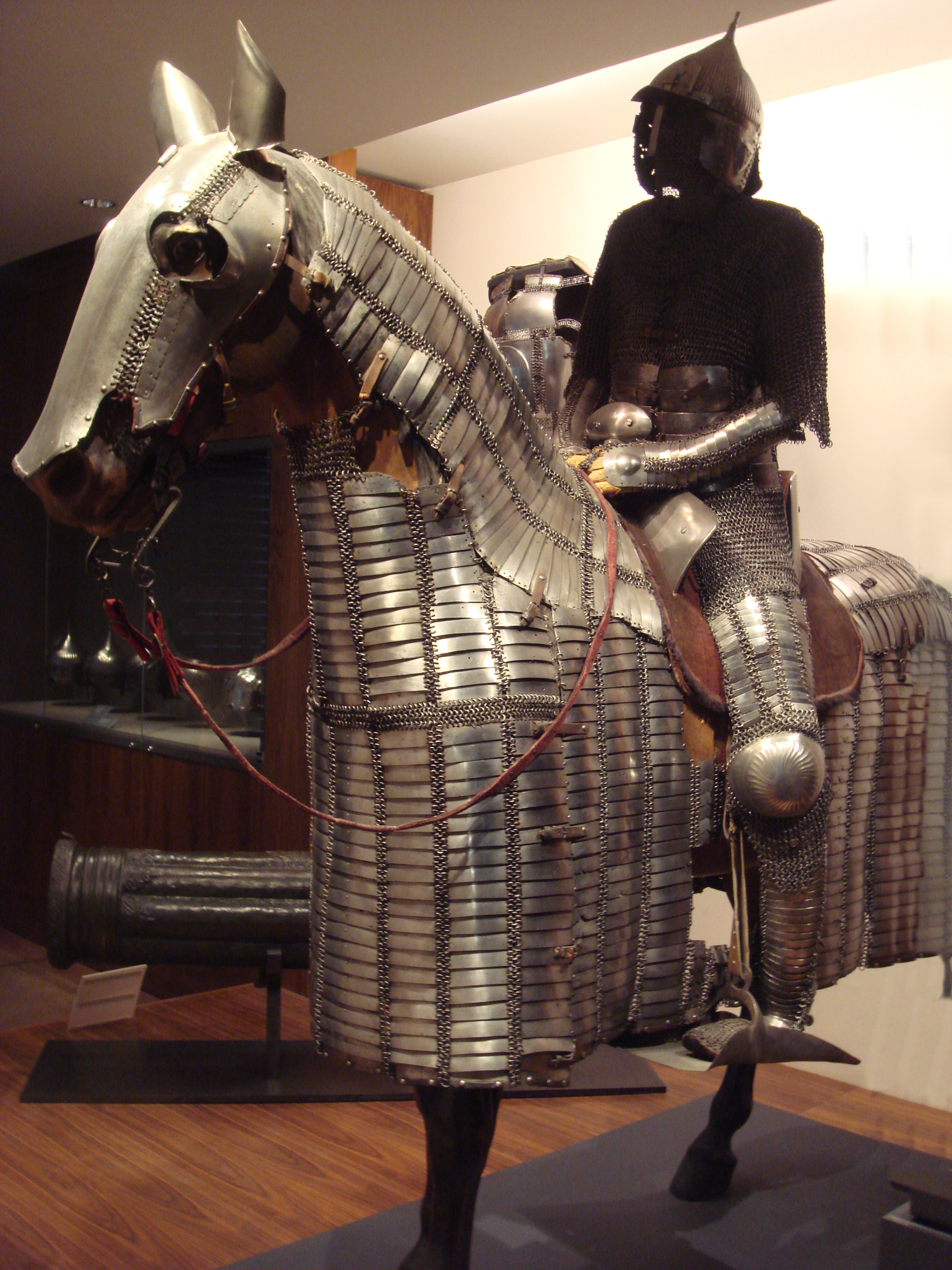
Ottoman Mamluk horseman with mail and plate armour, 1550

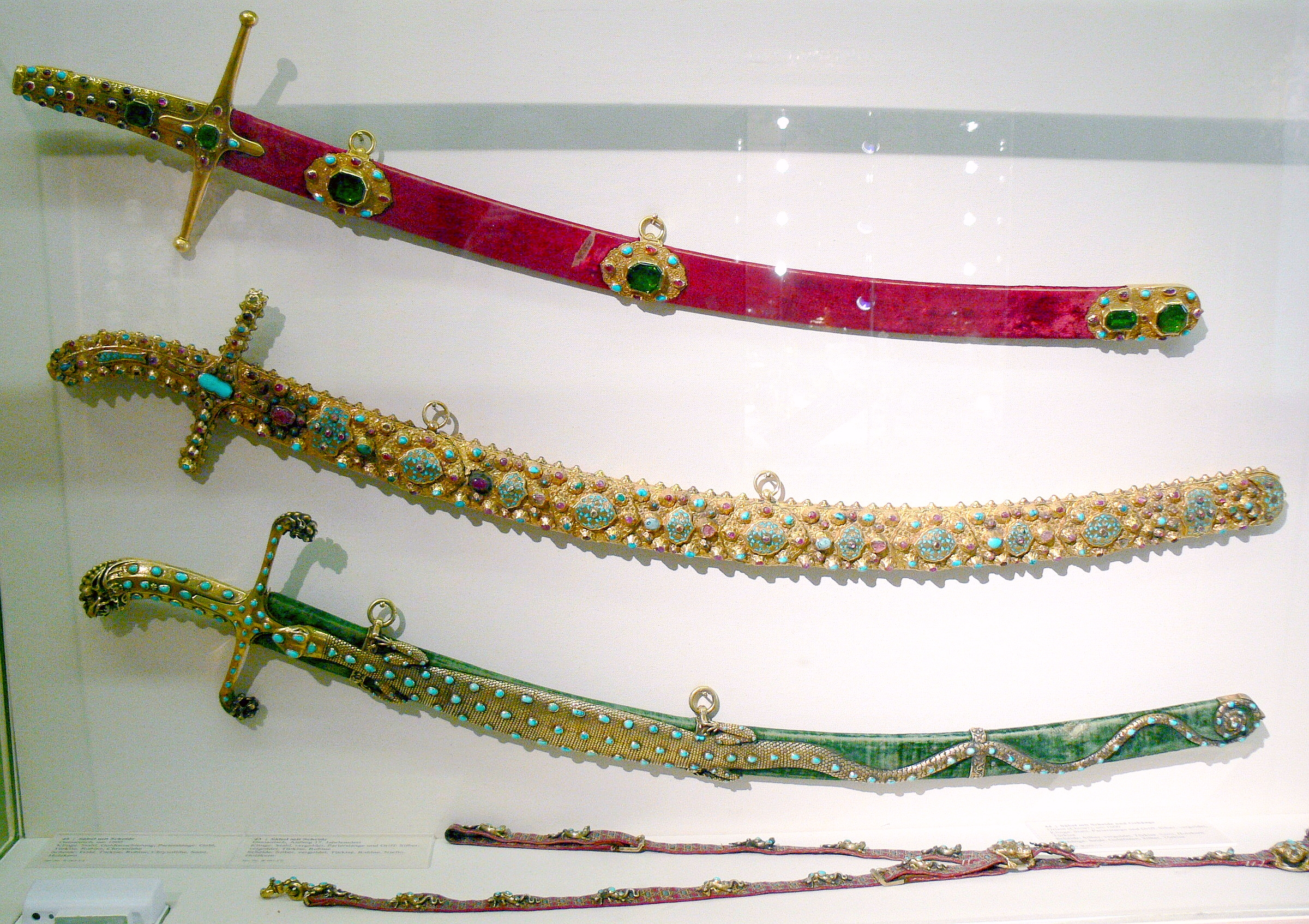
Jeweled Ottoman sabres

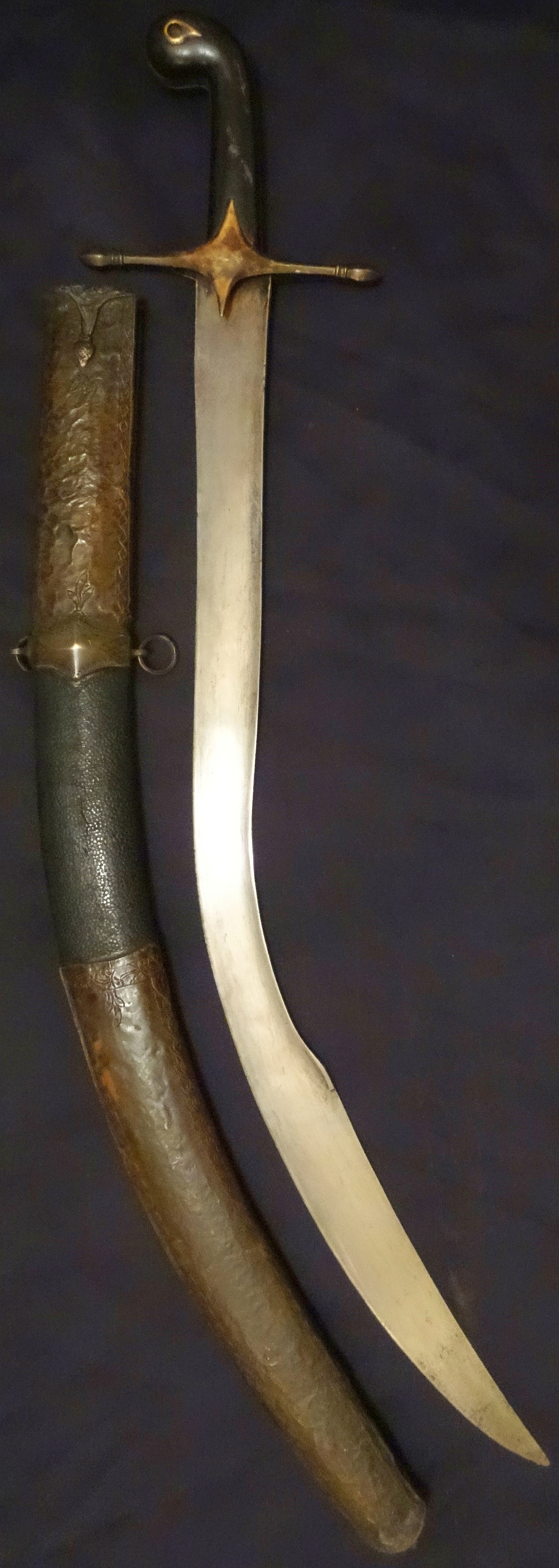
Kilij sword was in use from the early 17th century, for more than 300 years, well into the 20th century.

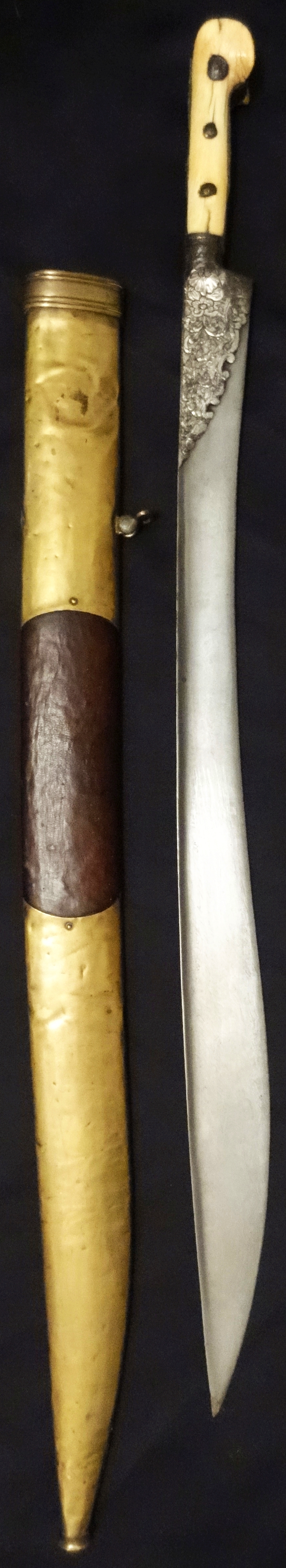
Ottoman yataghan sword, 19th century or earlier.

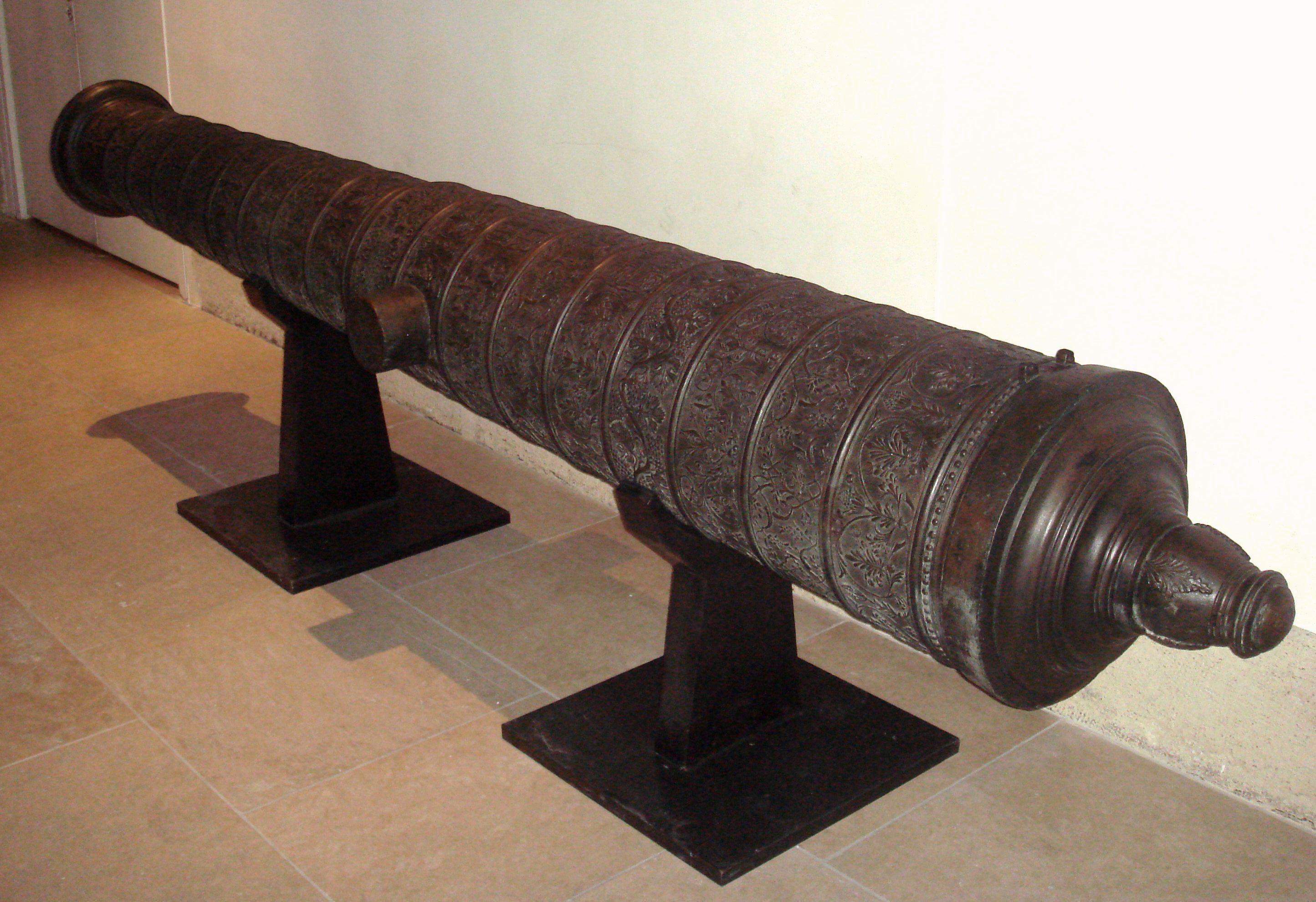
Decorated Ottoman cannon, 1581

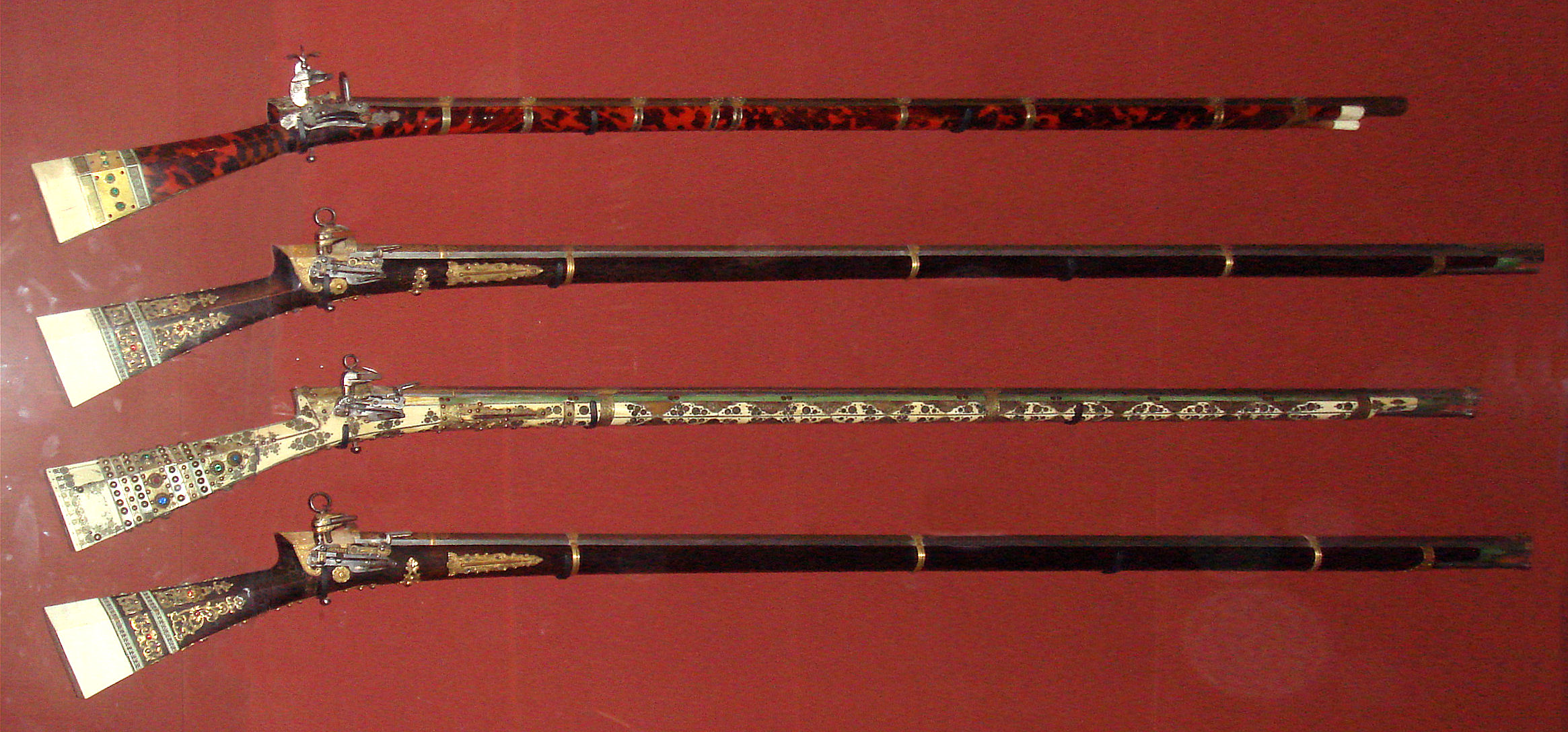
Ottoman rifles "Shishane", 1750-1800

== See also ==
- Turkish and Islamic Arts Museum
- Culture of the Ottoman Empire
- Ottoman clothing
- Islamic calligraphy
- List of Ottoman calligraphers
- History of Modern Turkish painting
- Turkish women in fine arts
- Tiled Kiosk
