= Divriği Great Mosque and Hospital =

13th-century Anatolian beylik-era mosque in central Turkey

UNESCO World Heritage Site
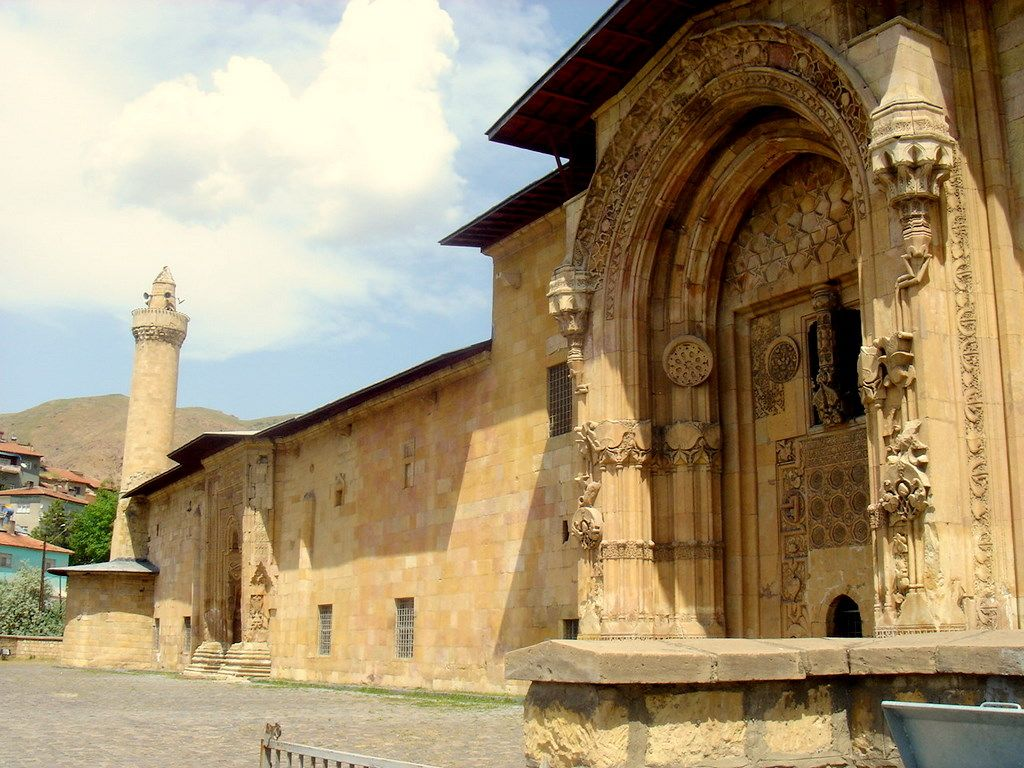

- Location within Turkey
- Location: Divriği, Sivas Province, Turkey
- Criteria: Cultural: (i), (iv)
- Reference: 358
- Inscription: 1985 (9th Session)
- Area: 2,016 ha (4,980 acres)
- Coordinates: 39°22′16.576″N 38°07′18.574″E

Divriği Great Mosque and Hospital (Turkish: Divriği Ulu Cami ve Darüşşifası) was built in 1228–1229 by the local dynasty of the Mengujekids in the small Anatolian town of Divriği, now in Sivas Province, Turkey. The complex is in the upper town, below the citadel. The exquisite stone carvings and eclectic architecture of the complex place it among the most important works of architecture in Anatolia and led to its inclusion on UNESCO's World Heritage List in 1985.

== History ==
=== Background ===
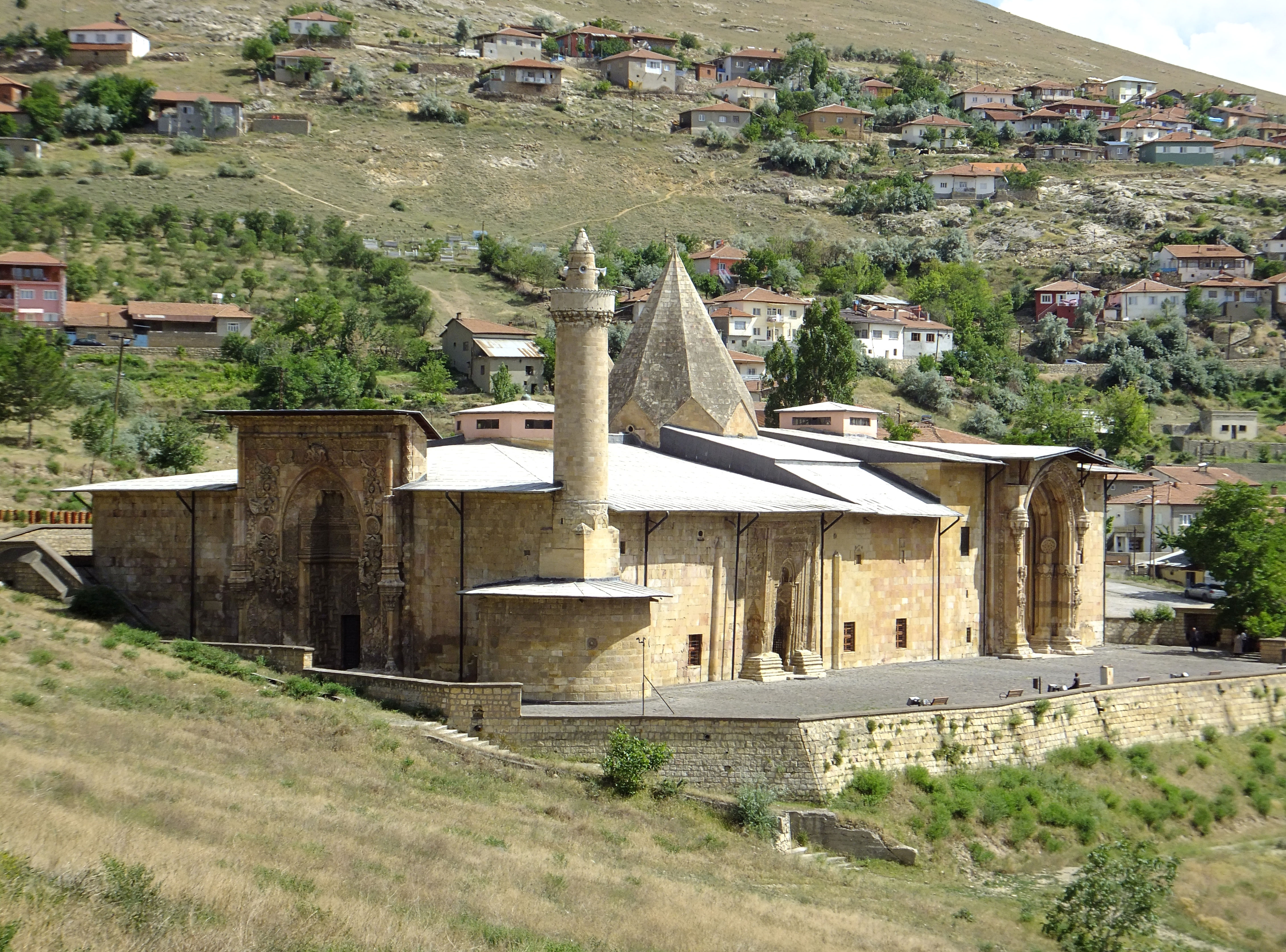
The mosque and hospital complex, seen from the north, with the upper town of Divriği in the background (photo from 2014)

The city of Divriği was founded in the 9th century under Byzantine rule, but after the defeat of the Byzantines in the Battle of Manzikert (1071) it was occupied by Turkish tribes who settled the region. In this period the region of Anatolia came to be ruled by numerous competing beyliks ruled by local Turkish dynasties and offshoots of the Seljuk dynasty. In the 12th century, the Mengujekids or Mengücek dynasty controlled Divriği and other nearby cities such as Erzincan. During the same century, after the death of emir İshak, the dynasty was divided into two branches, with one branch ruling from Divriği while the other ruled from Erzincan. The Mengujekids were related by marriage to the Seljuks of Konya and acknowledged them as their protectors and allies when the Sultanate of Rum, ruled from Konya, was at the height of its power.

The Mengücek rulers were great patrons of arts, science, and literature. Art historian Doğan Kuban argues that this may account for why a group of exceptional artists, necessary for the construction of the mosque and hospital, would have been present in the city around this time. He also notes that the cultural environment in this part of the world was highly diverse and dynamic during this period. Various groups of artisans and craftsmen likely travelled the region and moved from patron to patron, giving rise to an eclectic style of architecture that reflected influences from different places and traditions.

=== Foundation ===
The north portal of the mosque gives the date of 626 AH (1228-9) and the name of its patron as Ahmadshāh ibn Sulaymān, who is one of the rulers of the Divriği branch of the Mengujekids. The inscription on the portal of the hospital describes the building as a dār al-shifā' ("house of healing") and ascribes its foundation to Tūrān Malik bint Fakhr al-Dīn Bahramshāh. Fakhr al-Dīn Bahramshāh is the best-known Mengujekid ruler whose reign, in Erzincan, lasted for nearly sixty years until his death in 1225. Although it is often assumed that Ahmadshāh and Tūrān Malik were married, there is no evidence, inscriptional or otherwise, to prove a matrimonial relationship between these two members of the extended Mengujekid royal family.

The name of the chief architect is inscribed in the interior of both the mosque and the hospital and has been read as Khurramshāh ibn Mughīth al-Khilātī. The name indicates his origin in the city of Ahlat, known in medieval sources as al-Khilāt.

=== Restorations ===
According to inscriptions, the complex was significantly restored multiple times between the 15th and 19th centuries. More restoration work was carried out in the 20th century to counteract material deterioration and structural problems. In 2010 another major restoration process was decided. After several years of preparation, restoration work began in 2015 when the first tender was held. The project halted and then resumed in 2017, but halted again in 2019 for financial reasons, though many stages of the process were already completed by then. A new tender was held in 2021 and in February 2022 work resumed on the last stages of the restoration process. The mosque was reopened to visitors in May 2024 after the project's completion.

== Architecture ==
The building complex consists of a mosque which adjoins the hospital with which it shares its southern, qibla wall. A mausoleum is attached to the hospital.

=== The mosque ===
==== Exterior ====
The main entrance to the mosque is on the northern side and is marked by a tall portal which is celebrated for the quality and density of its high-relief stone carving. An entrance on the western side may be from a later date, as this façade of the mosque had collapsed and was rebuilt at a later date when it was also strengthened by a round buttress on the north-western corner. A third entrance to the mosque is located on the eastern façade. This entrance appears to have served as a royal entrance which gave access to the raised wooden platform in the southeastern corner of the mosque's interior, reserved for the ruler and his entourage.

Mosque exterior

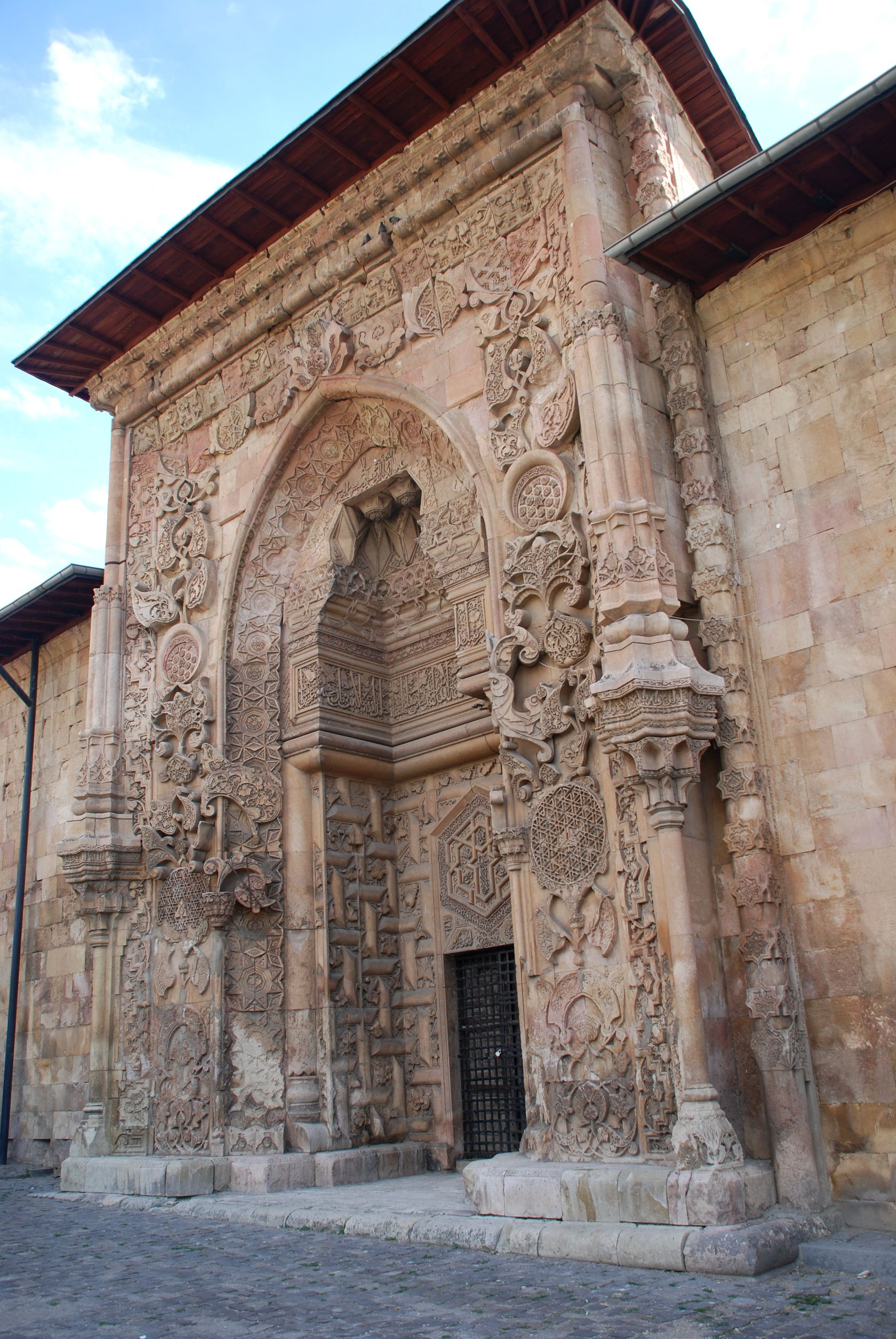
North entrance portal of the mosque

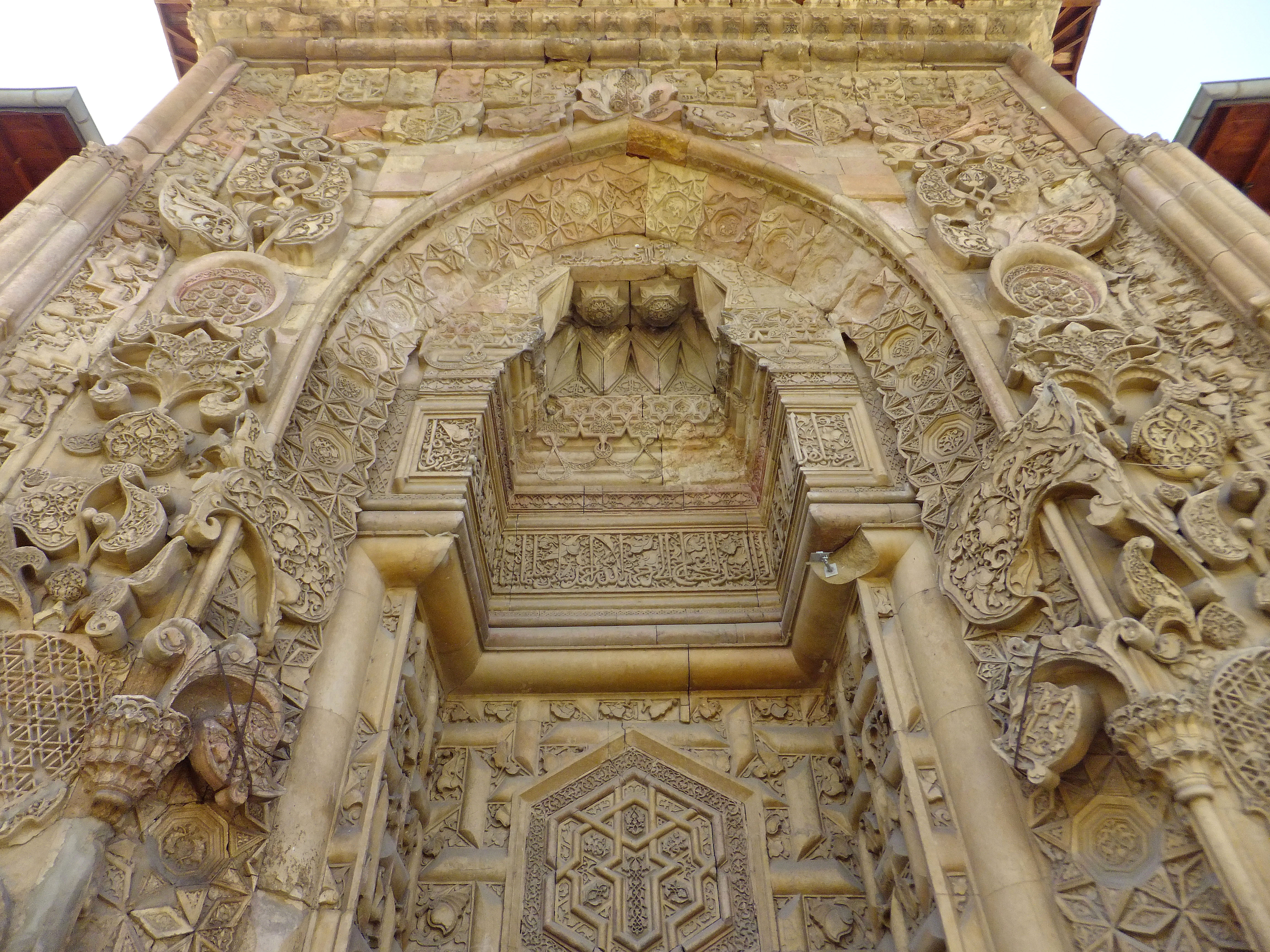
Closer view of the north portal

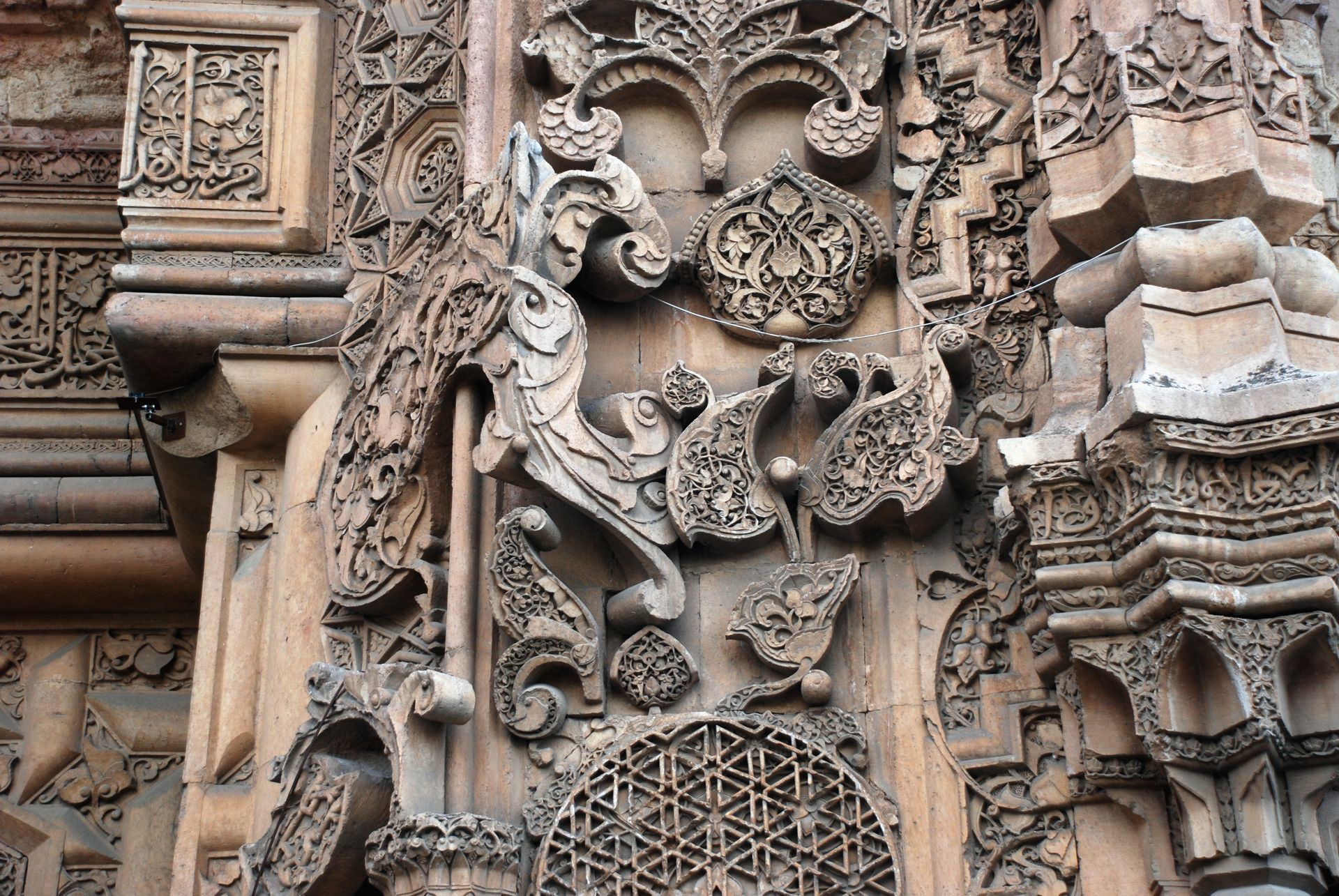
Details of the north portal

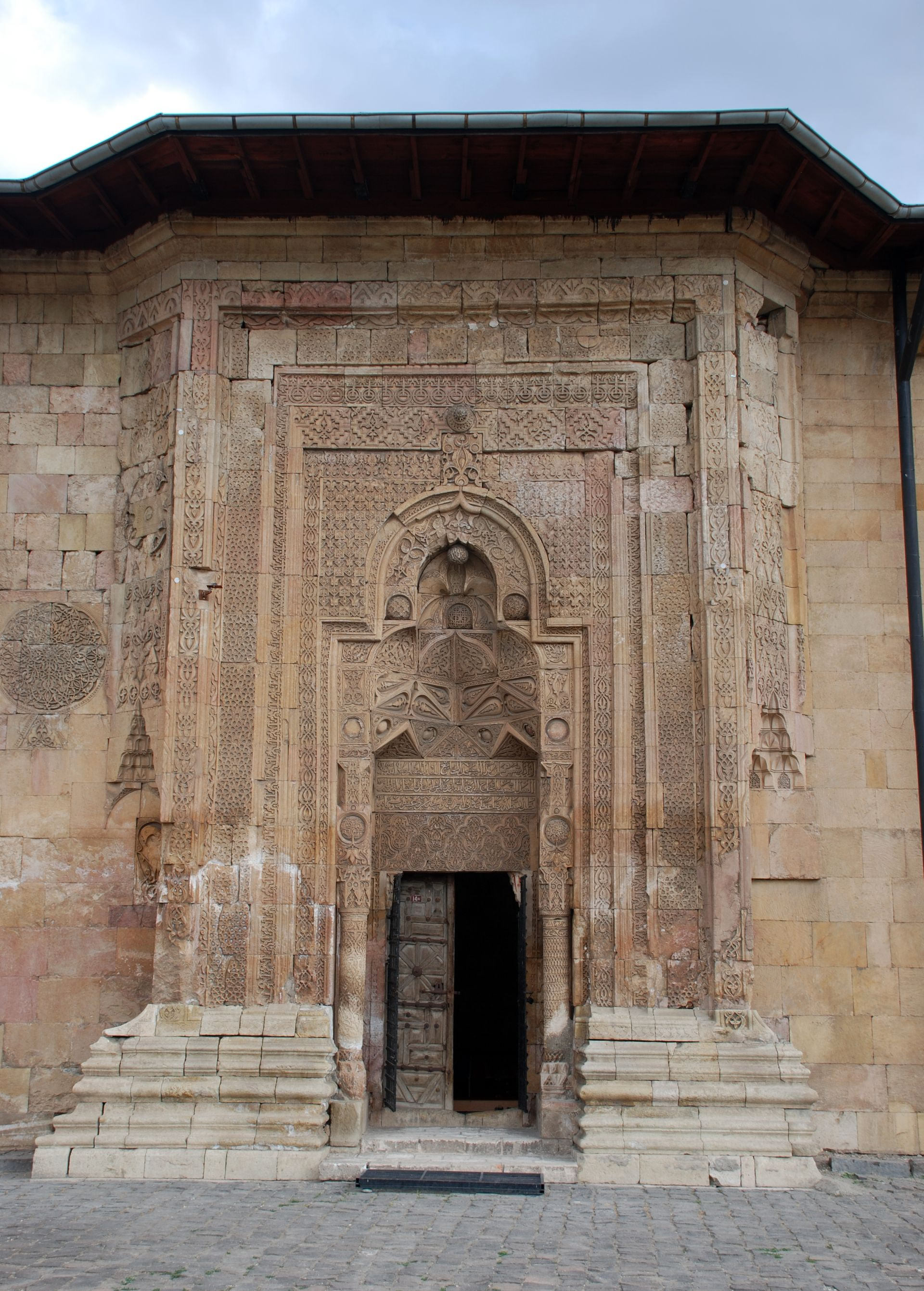
West entrance portal of the mosque

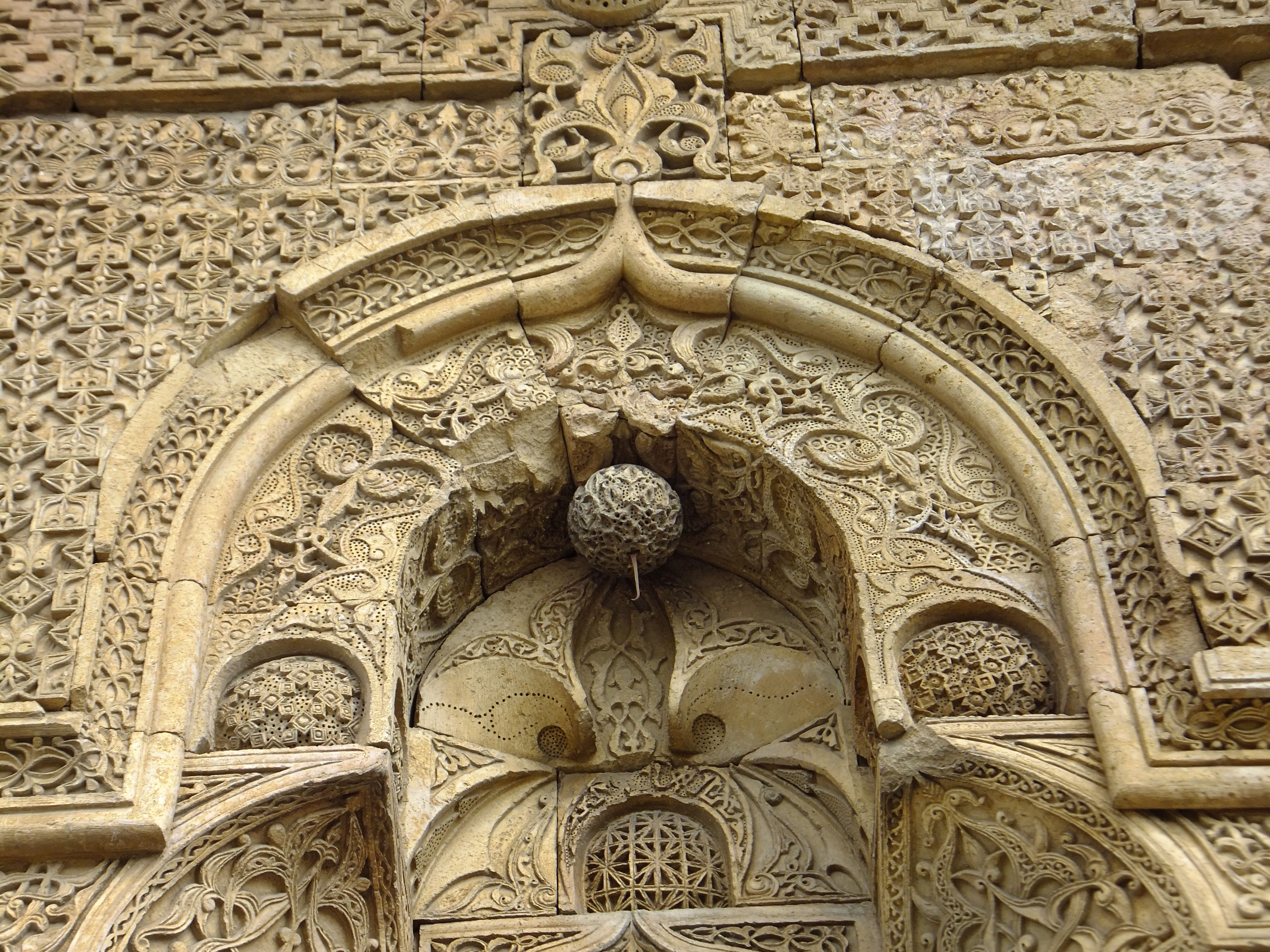
Details of the west portal

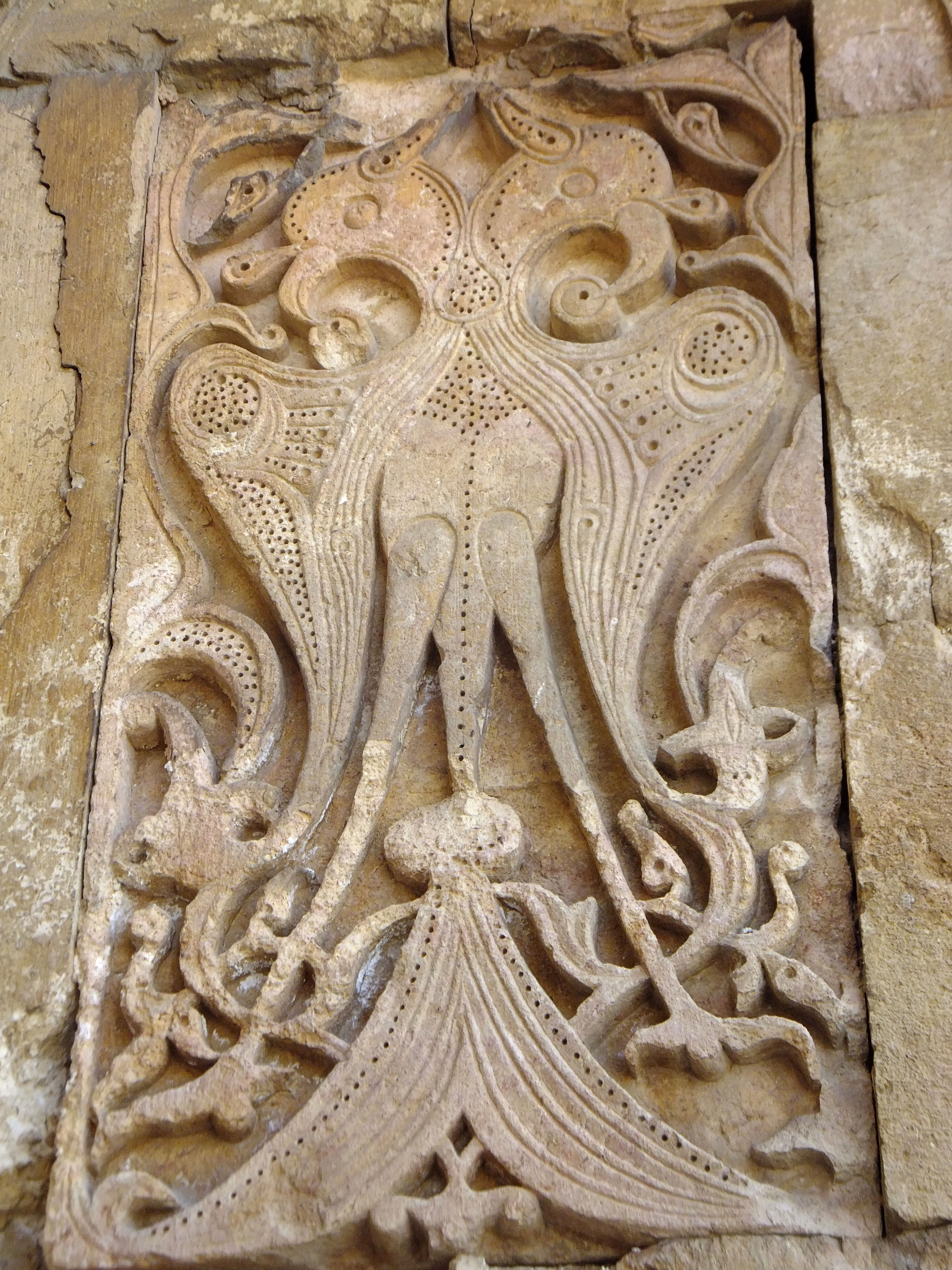
Double-headed eagle motif on the side of the west portal

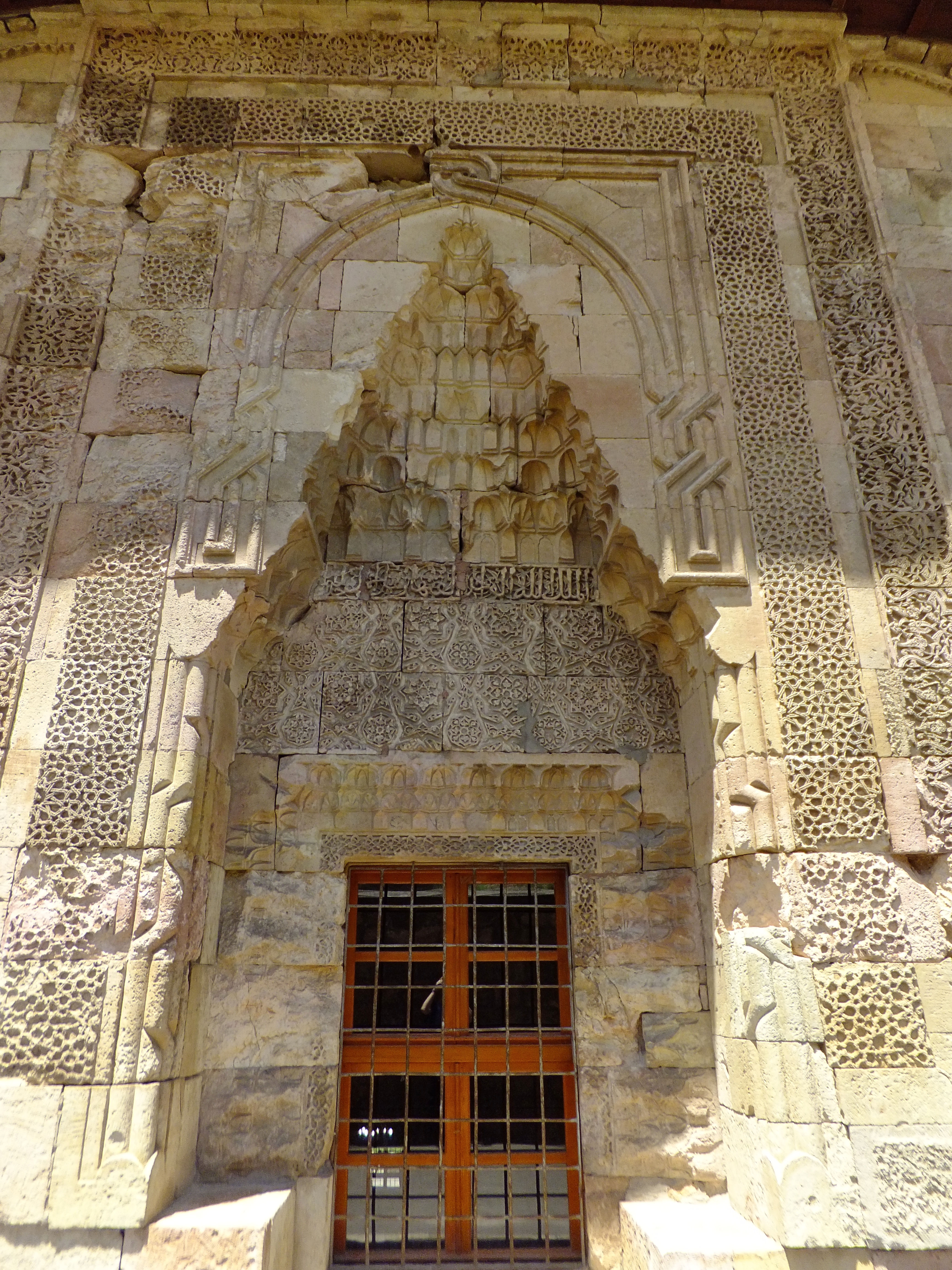
Eastern portal/window of the mosque

==== Interior ====
The interior of the mosque consists of stone piers which support the stone vaults above. The central bay of the mosque appears to have been left open to the sky, as is the case in other medieval Anatolian mosques which omit courtyards. Some of the original wooden furnishings of the mosque survive along its qibla wall, such as the shutters on the window opening to the tomb chamber within the hospital and its wooden minbar dated to 1243 and signed by the craftsman Ibrahīm ibn Ahmad al-Tiflīsī. Some carved wooden panels said to belong to the royal platform are today on view in the museum of the Directorate of Pious Endowments in Ankara.

Mosque interior

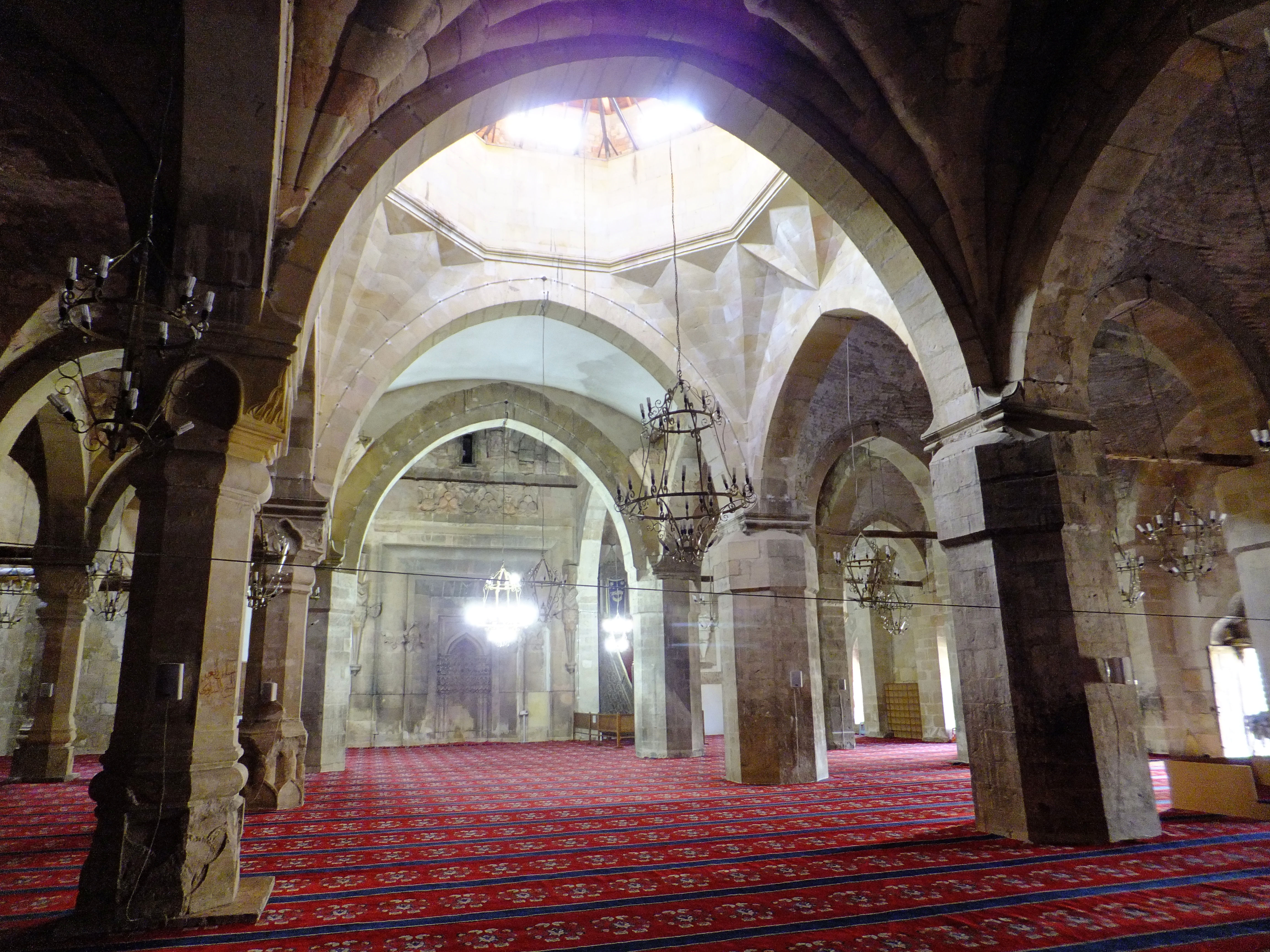
Interior of the mosque, looking south

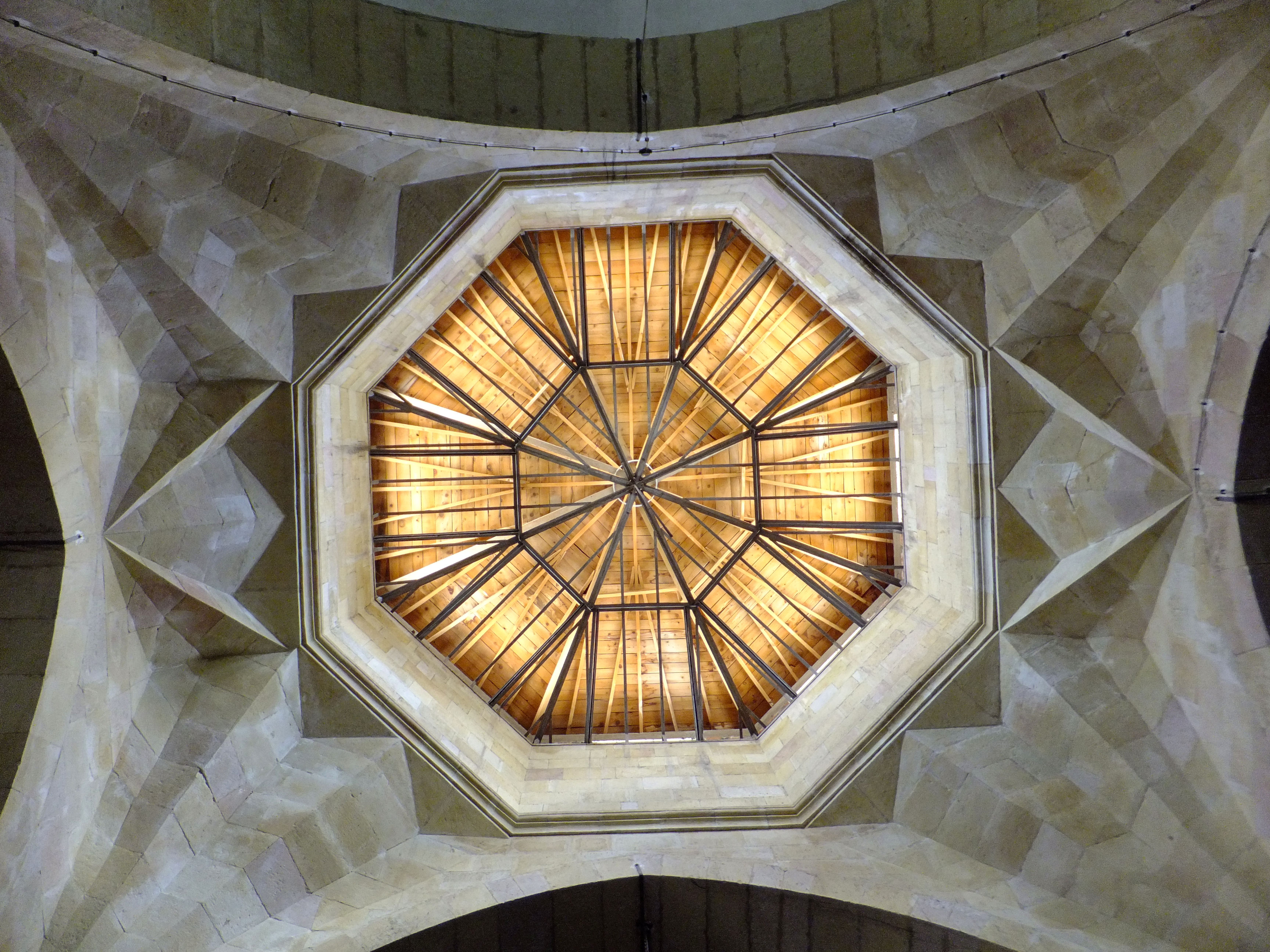
Light well (covered by a lantern) in the middle of the mosque

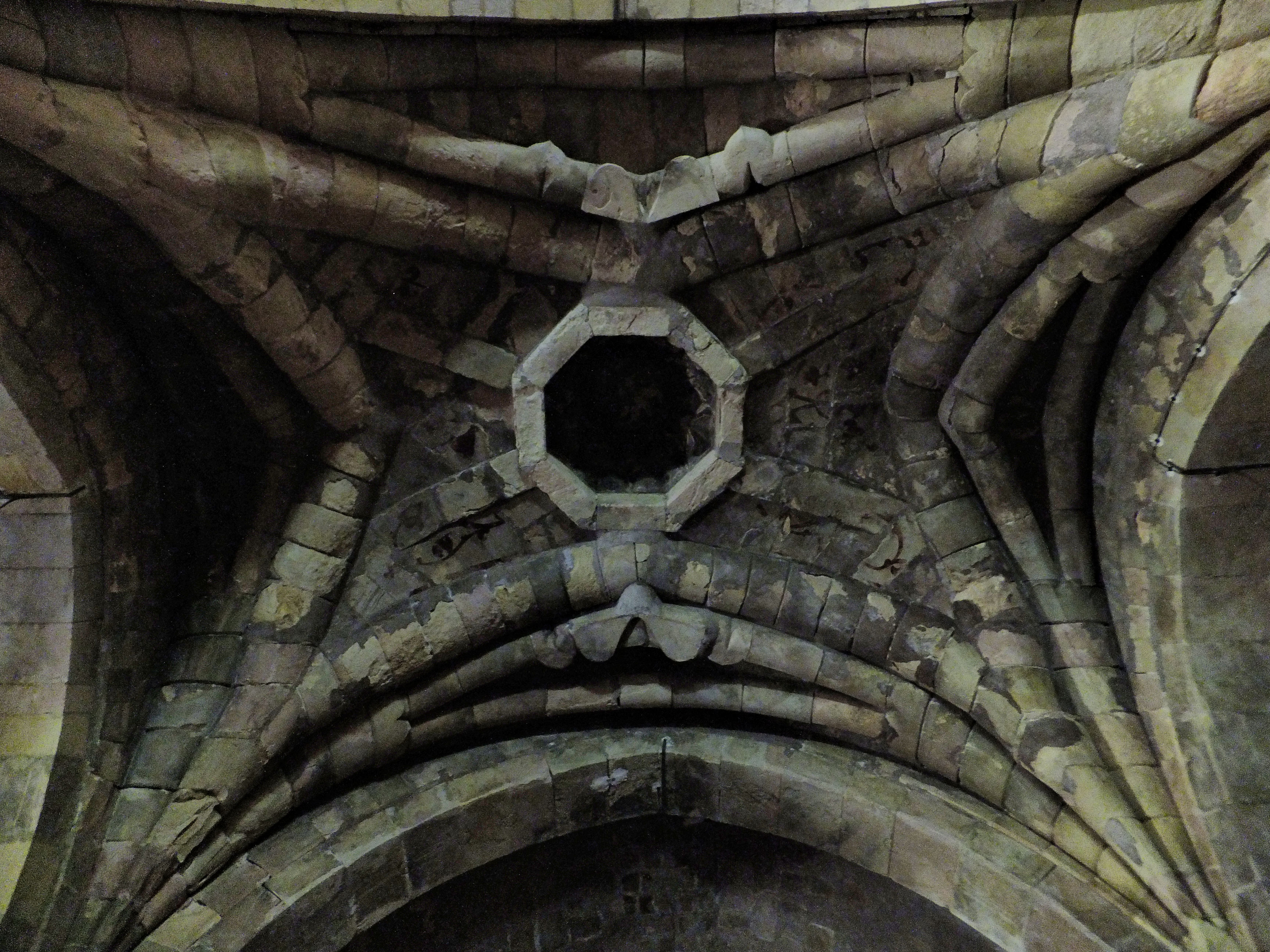
One of the many different vaults of the mosque ceiling

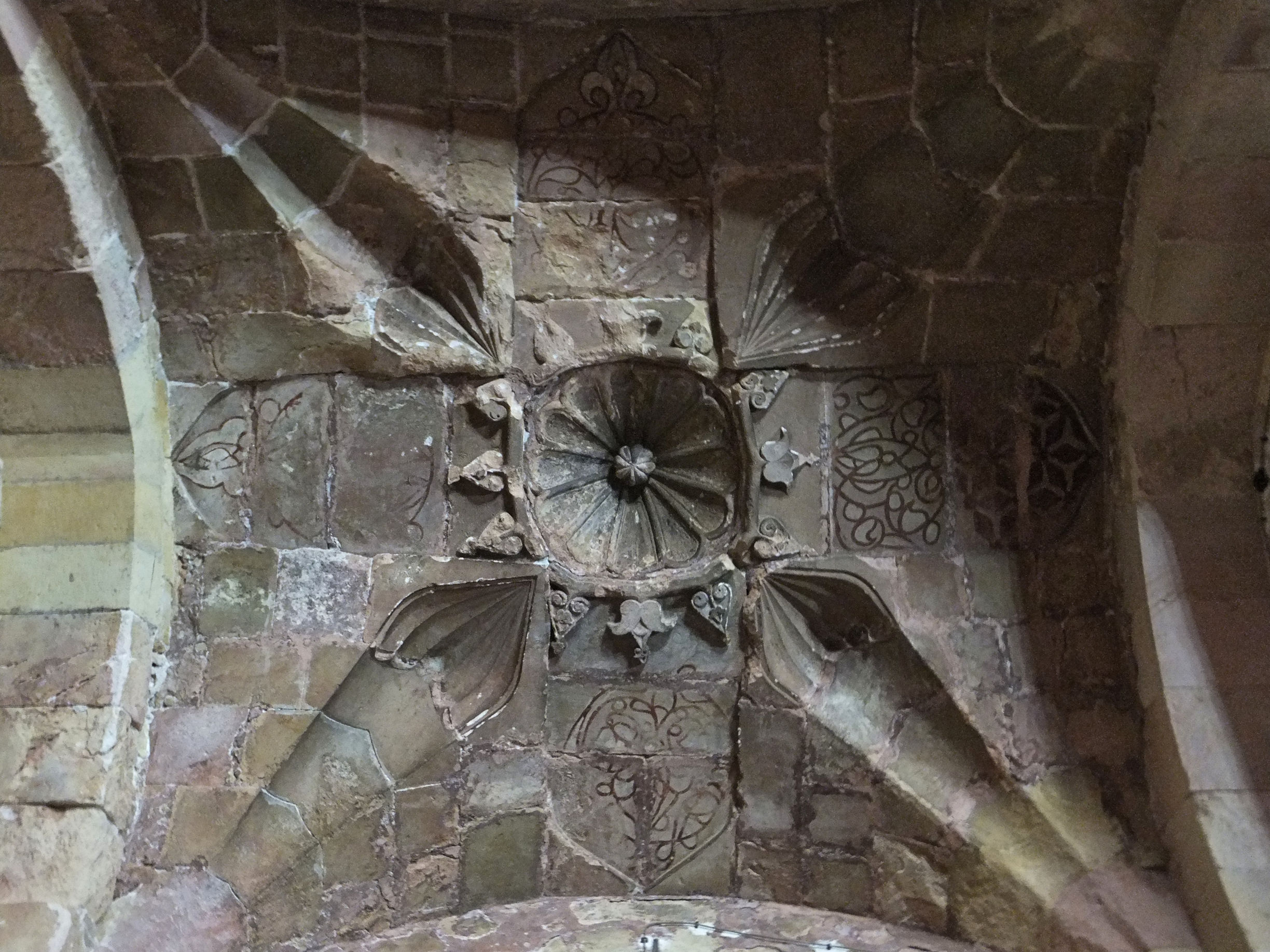
Another vault example in the mosque

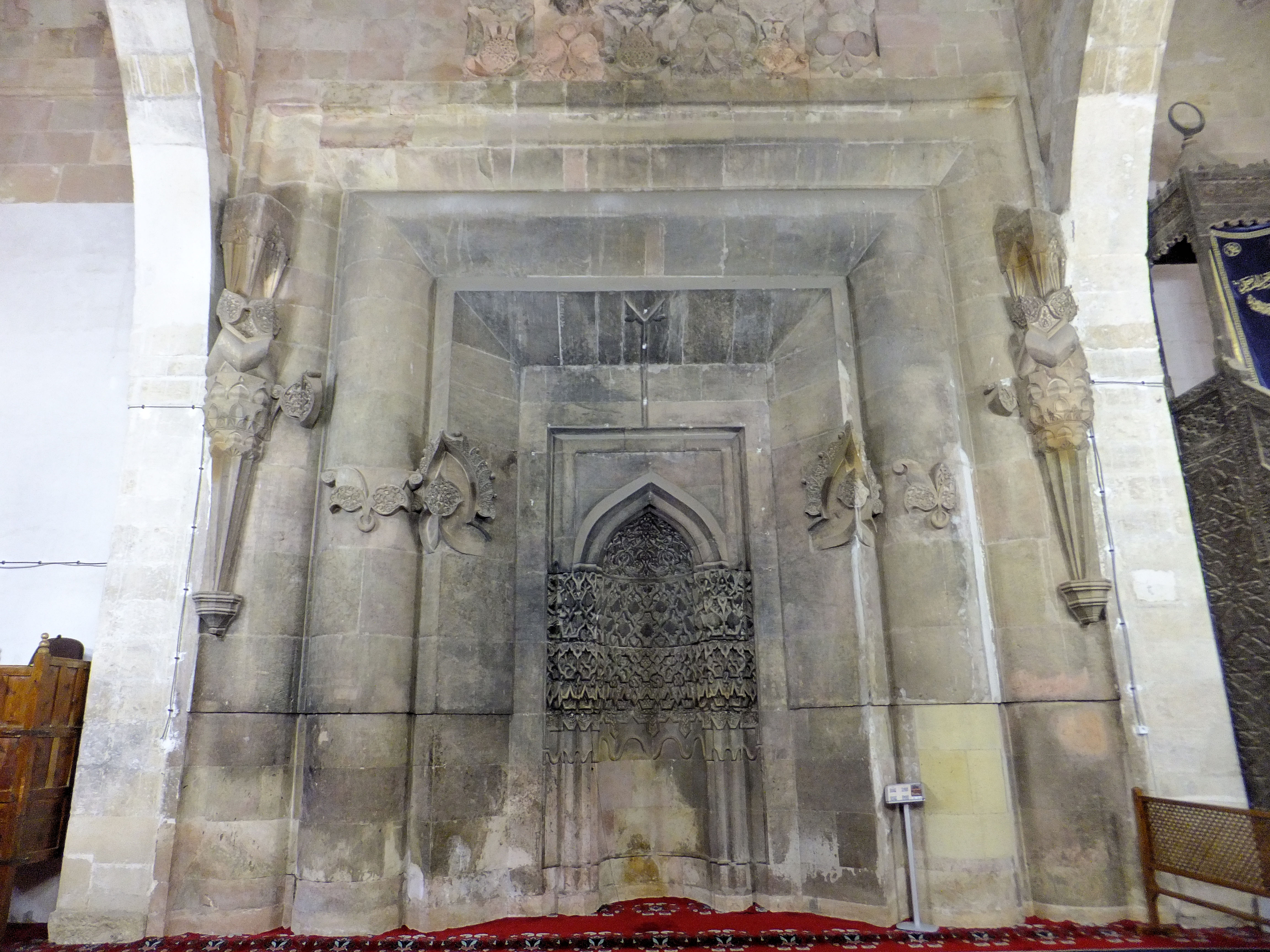
Mihrab of the mosque

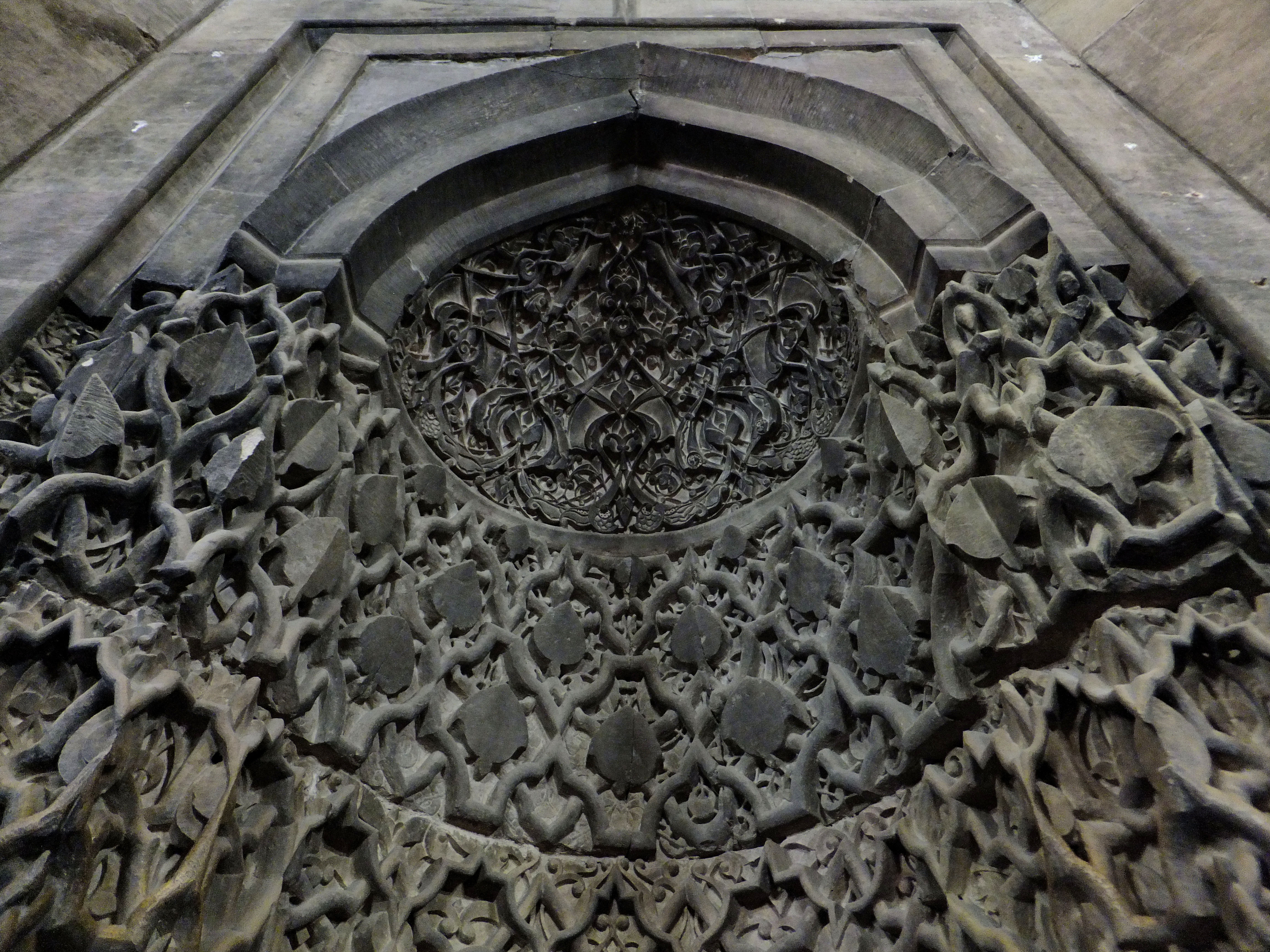
Close-up of the mihrab

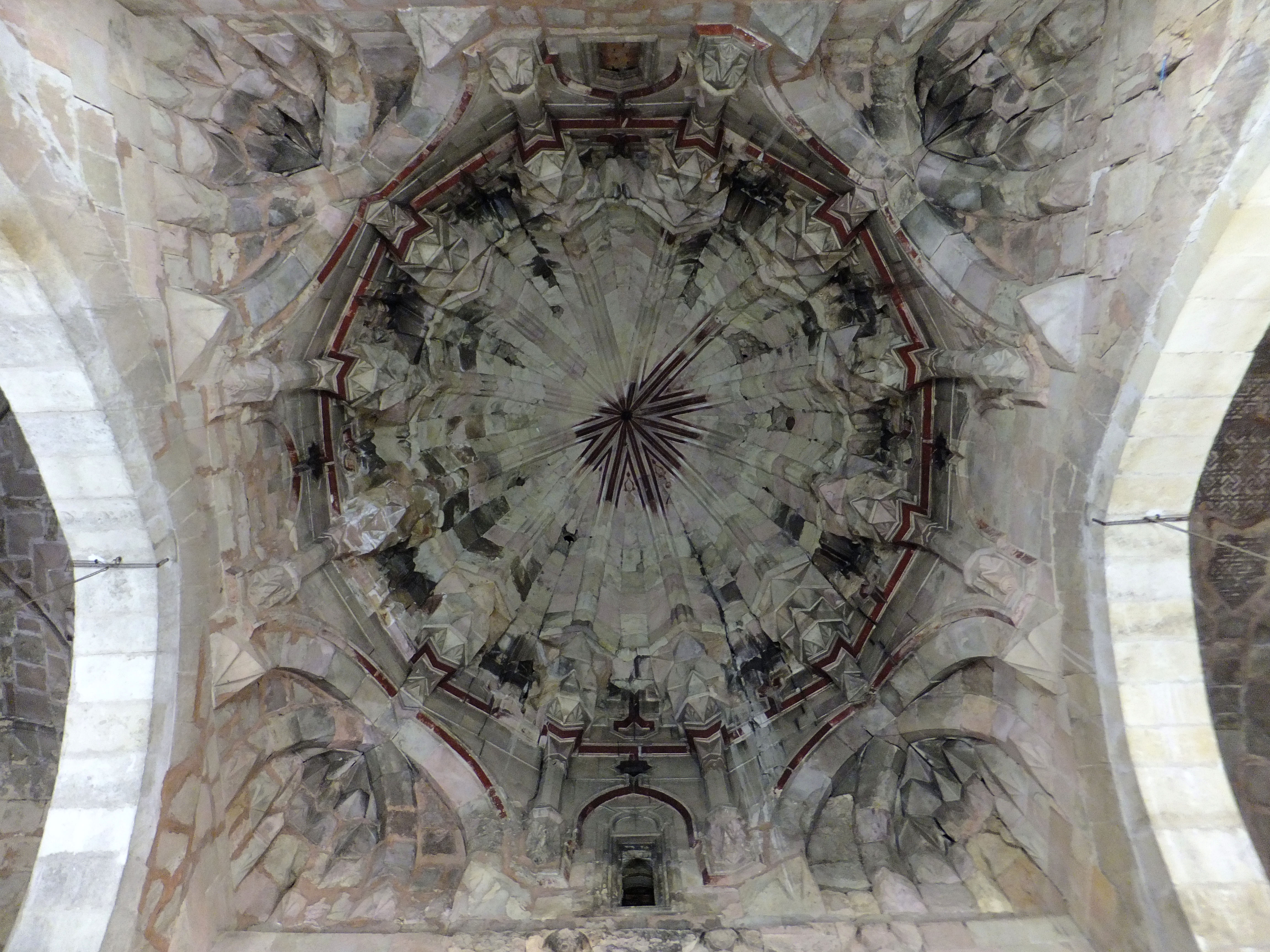
Dome in front of the mihrab

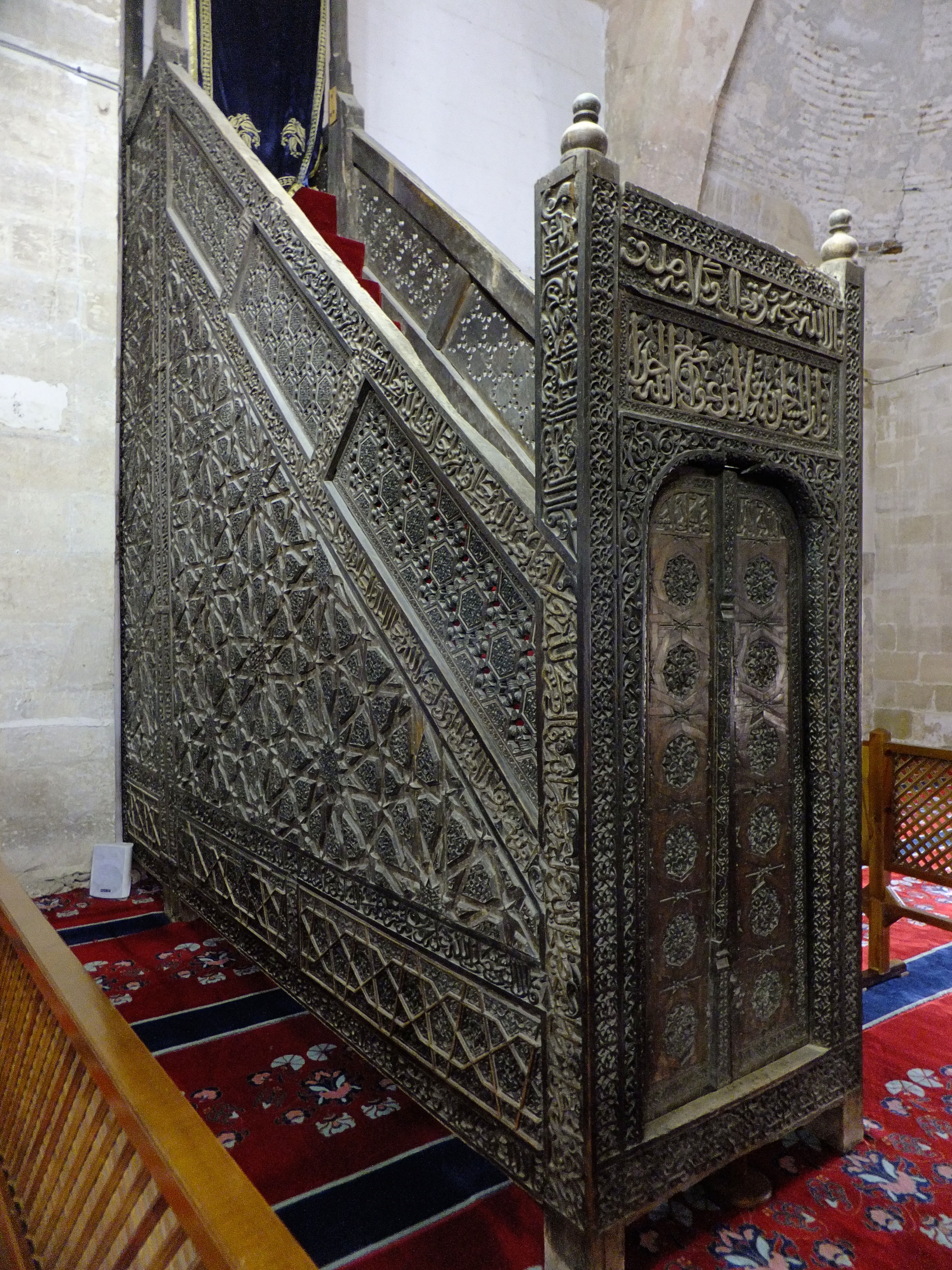
Minbar of the mosque

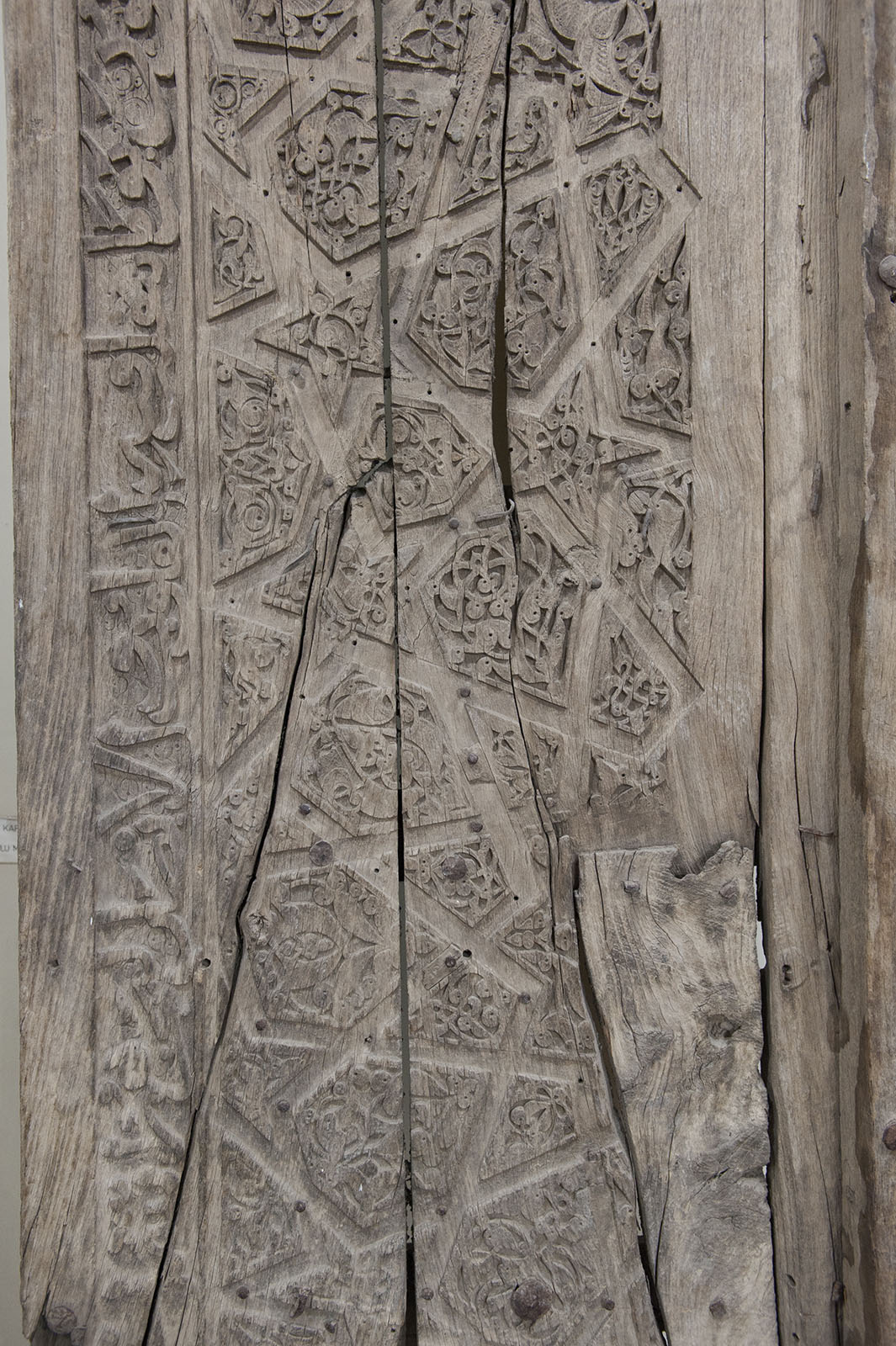
Wooden door/window shutter from the mosque, displayed at Sivas Congress and Ethnography Museum

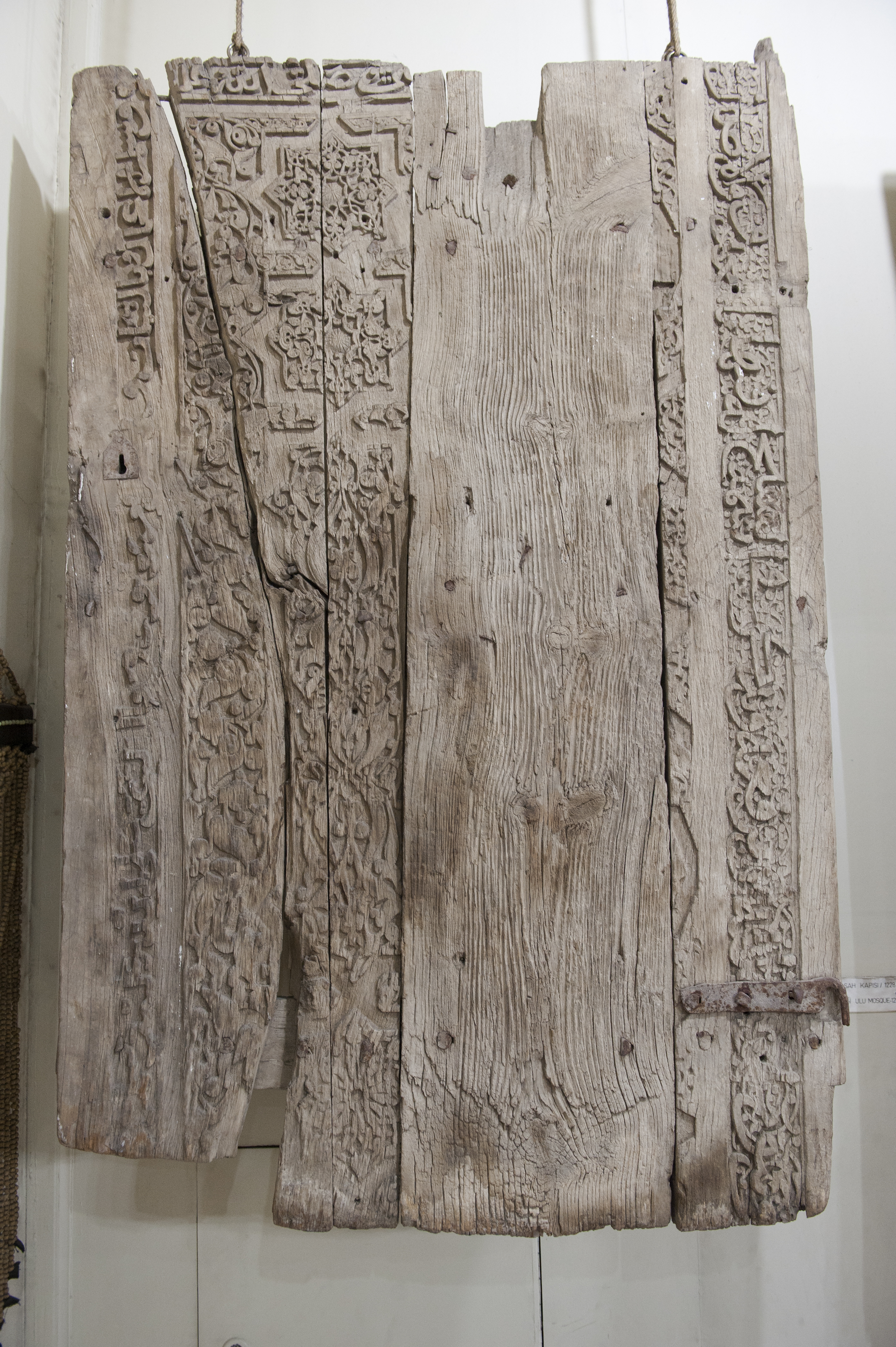
Wooden door/window shutter from the mosque, displayed at Sivas Congress and Ethnography Museum

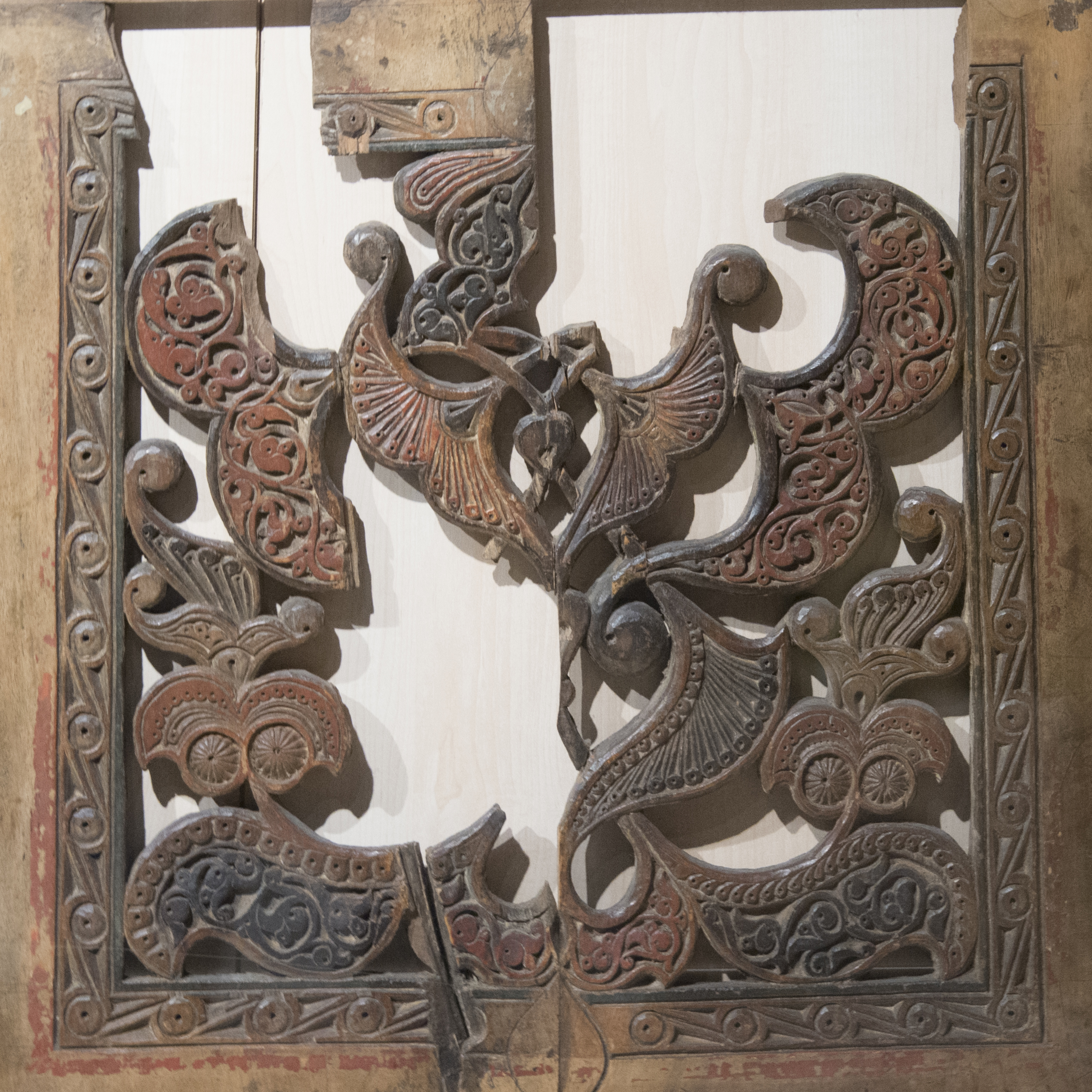
Part of wooden railing from the mosque, displayed at the Ankara Vakıf Museum

=== The hospital ===
The hospital is entered through its portal located on the western façade. Different in design from the north portal of the mosque, the hospital portal is framed by a monumental pointed arch and features a window in the center. The stone carving here is of the same quality as the main mosque portal but is less dense and appears, in certain places, to be unfinished. The interior of the hospital consists of rooms and iwans placed around a covered courtyard with a small pool in the center. The hospital has a second story on its southern side which is reached by a staircase just inside the entrance. One of the rooms of the hospital was dedicated to serve as a dynastic tomb chamber. This room has a window opening to the mosque.

Hospital exterior and interior

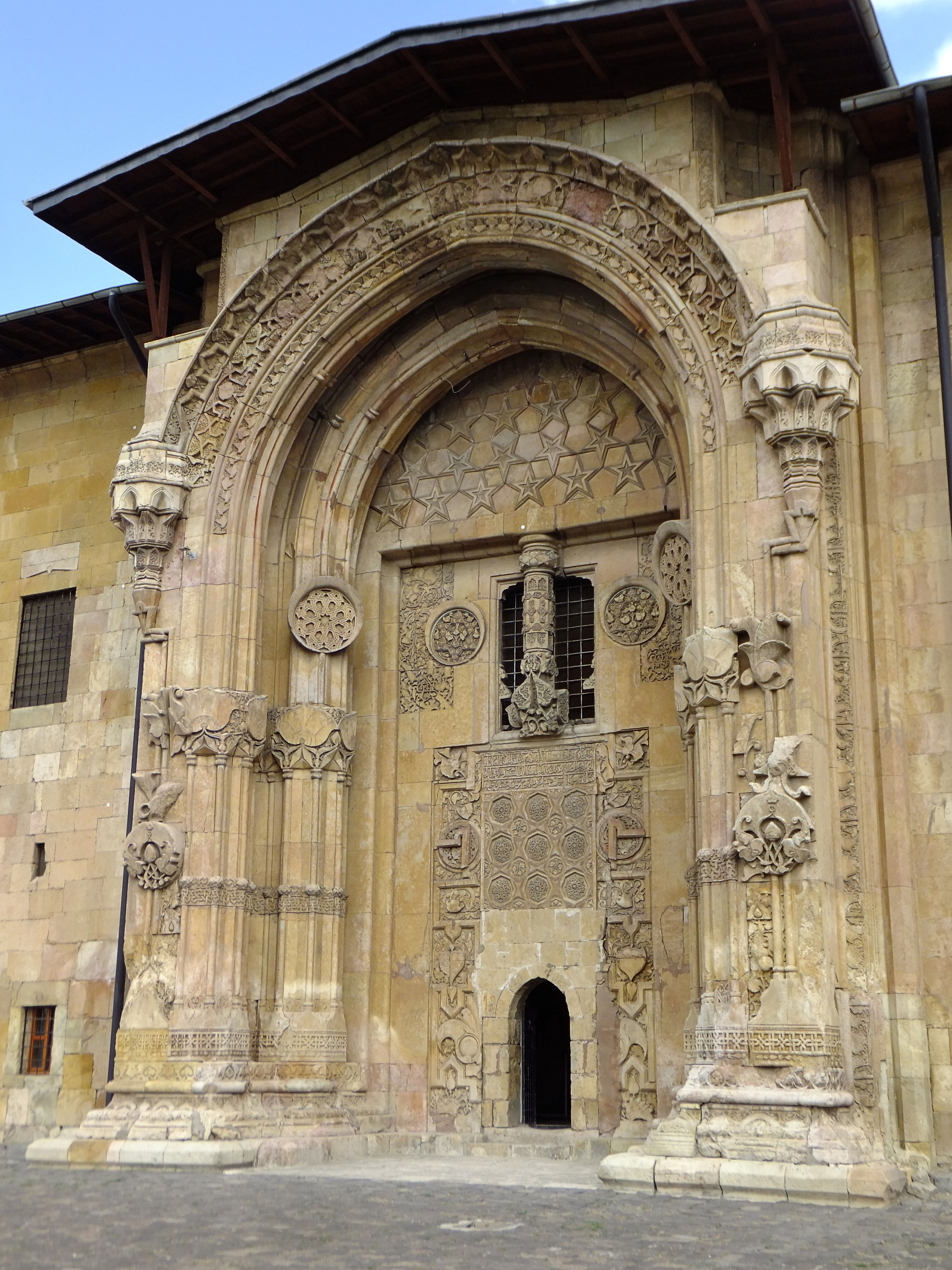
Entrance portal of the hospital

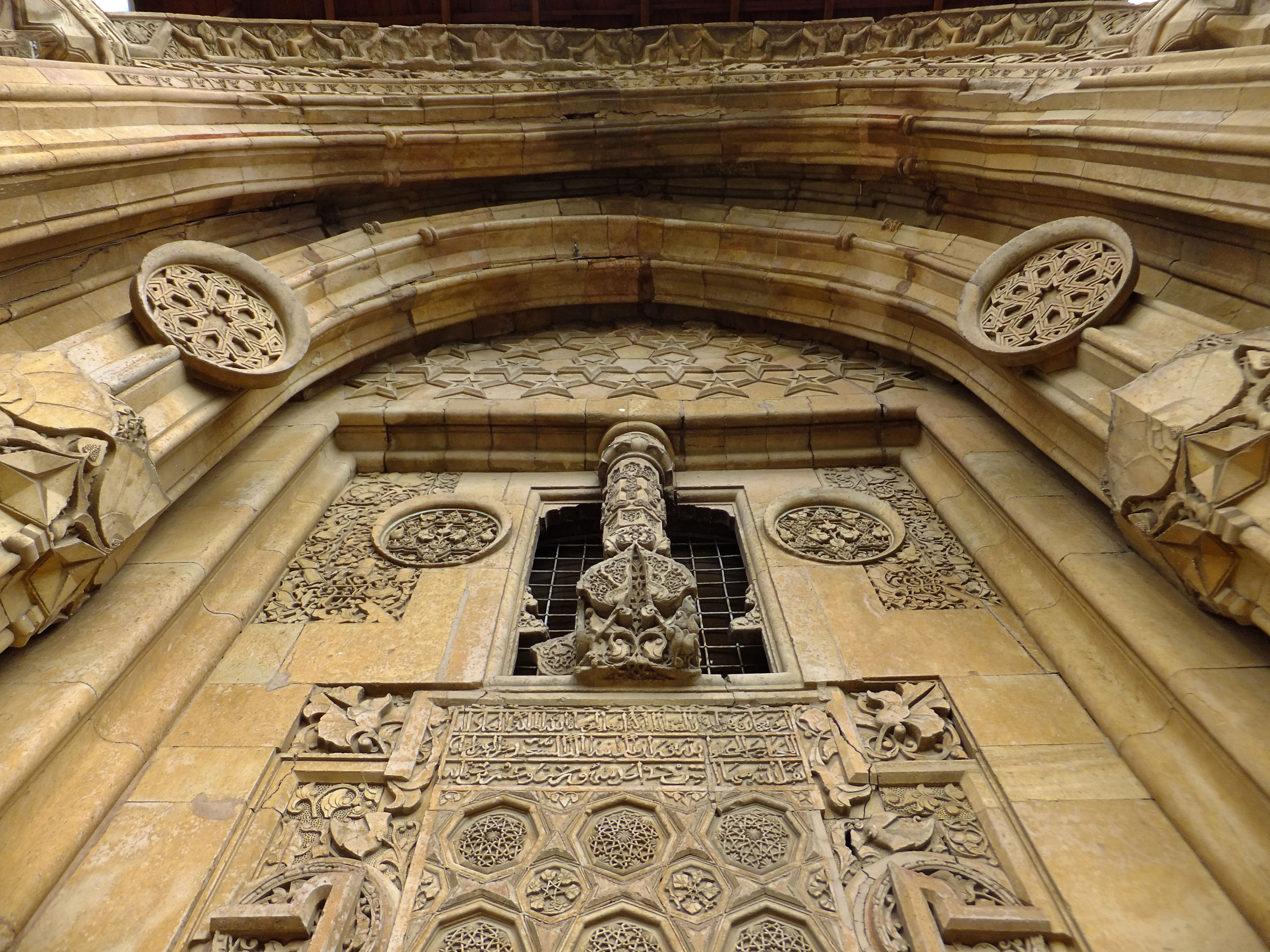
Closer view of the portal

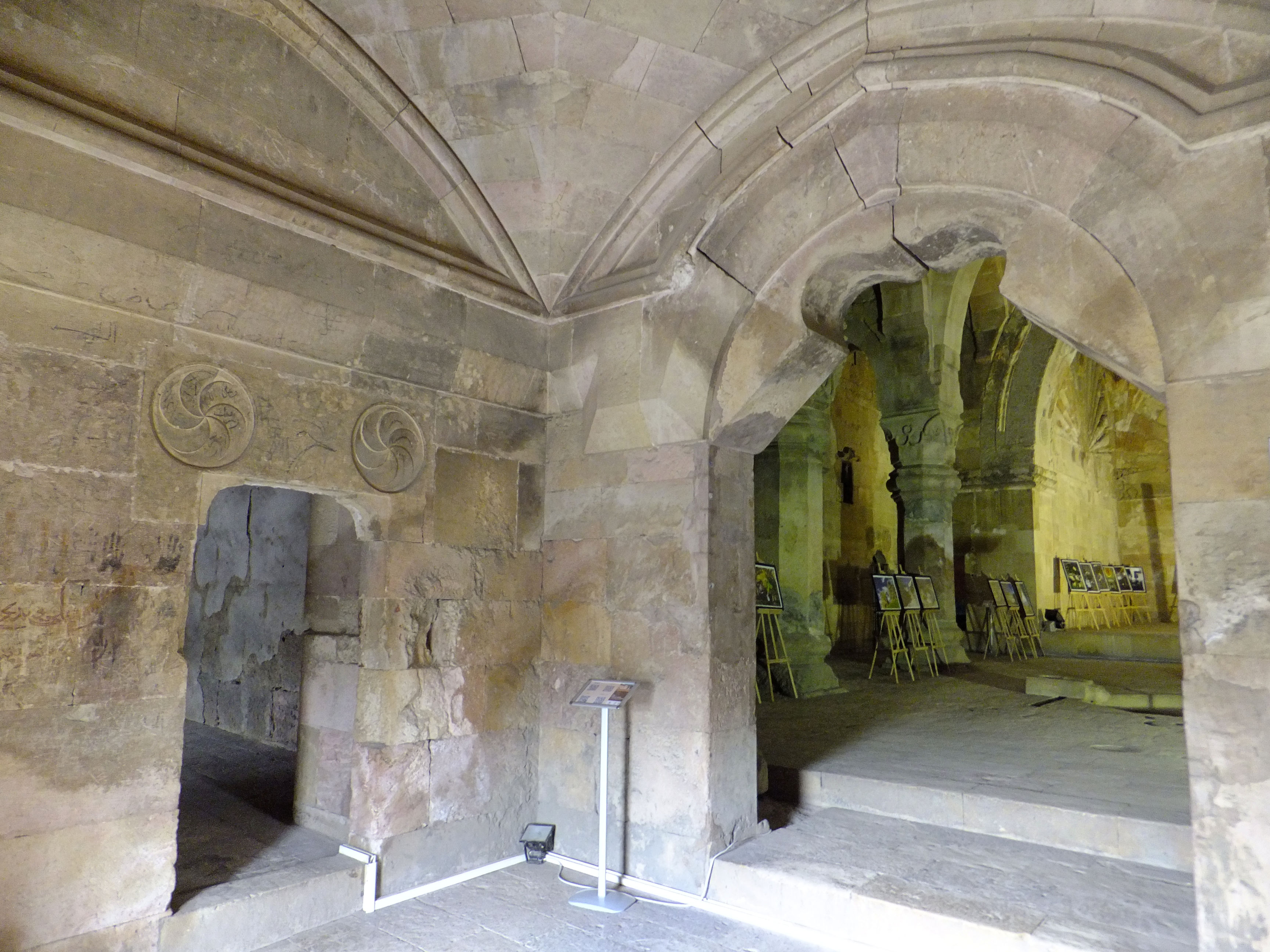
Vestibule of the hospital

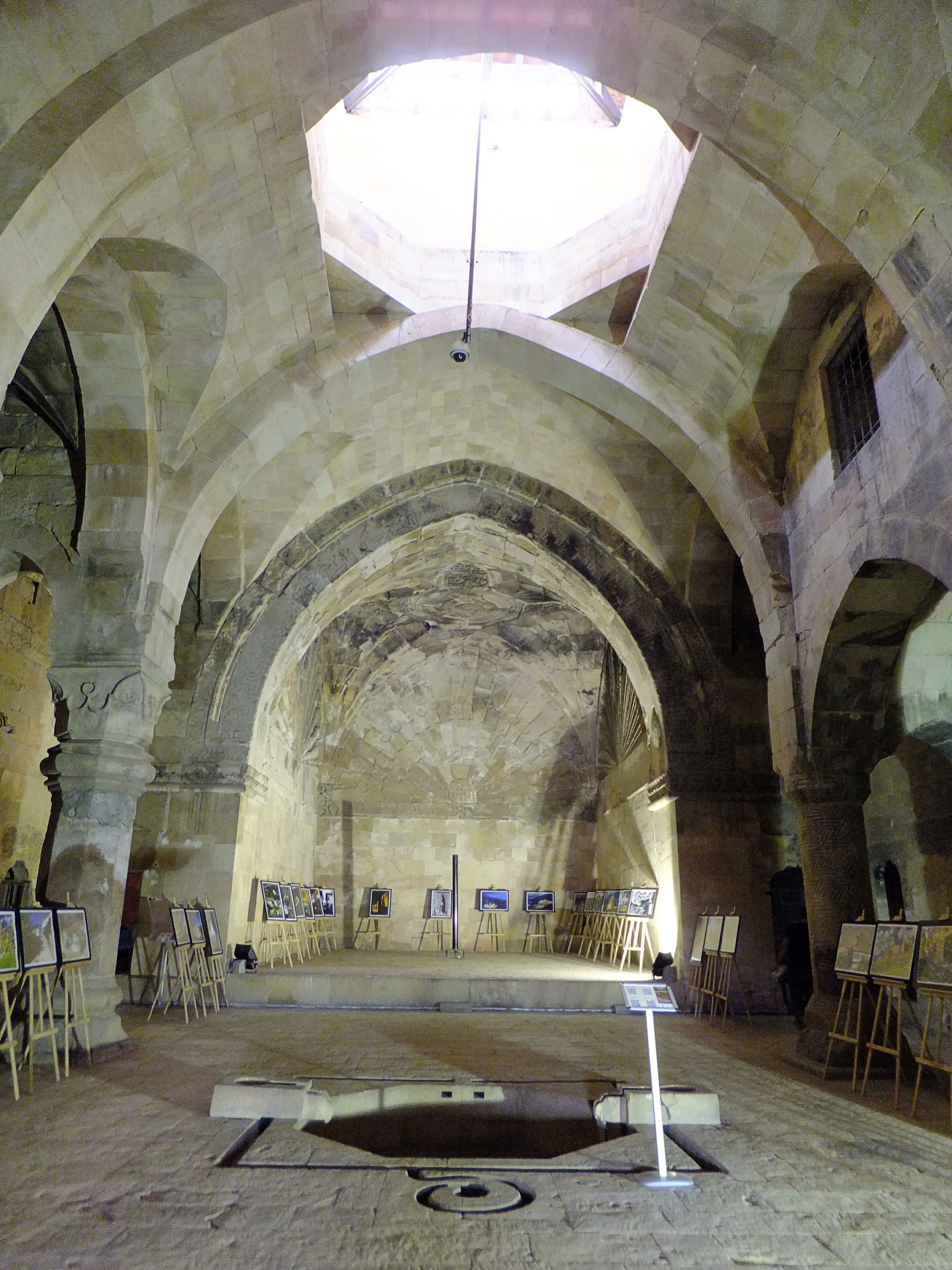
Interior (main hall) of the hospital, looking east

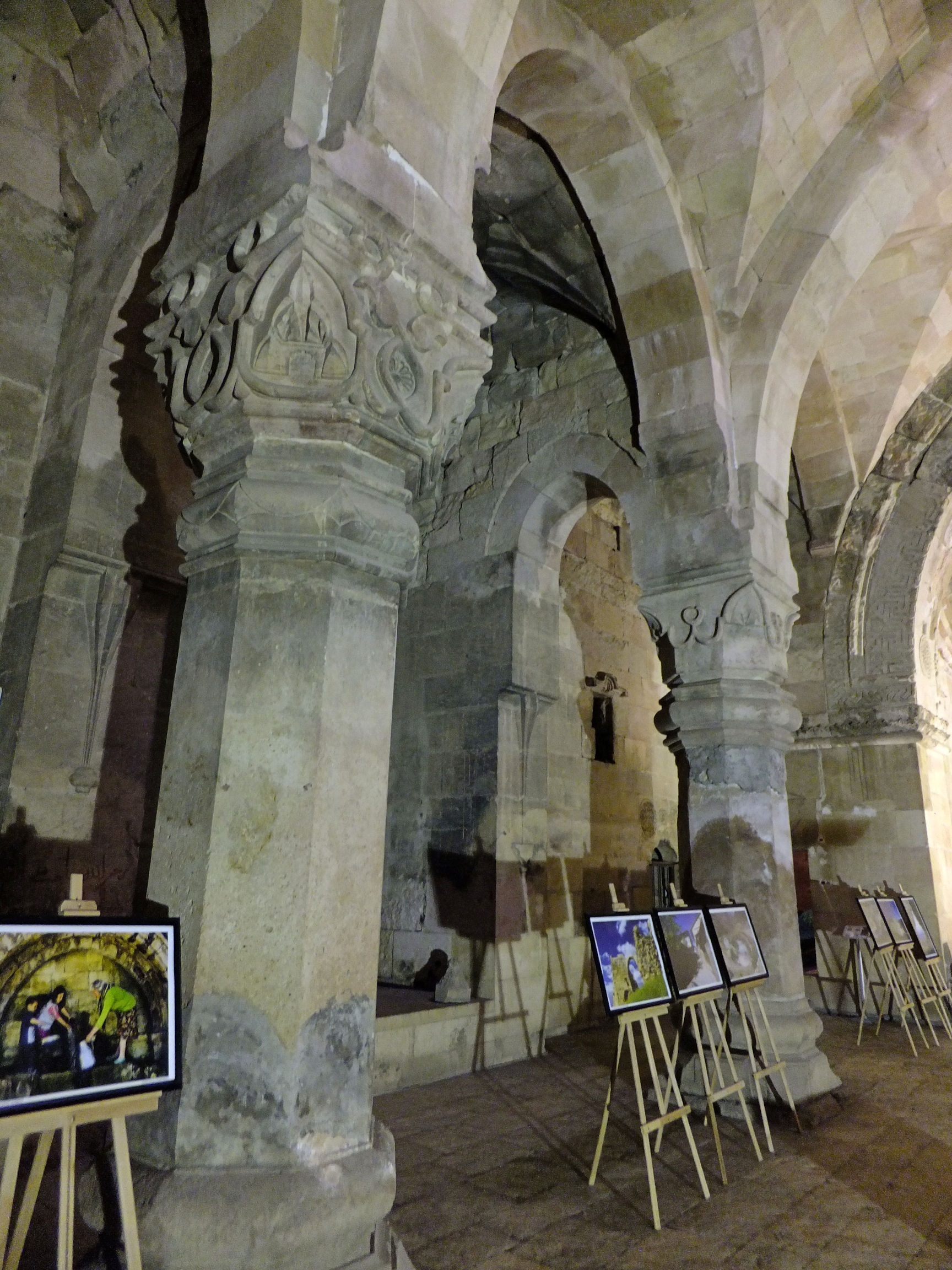
Columns of the main hall

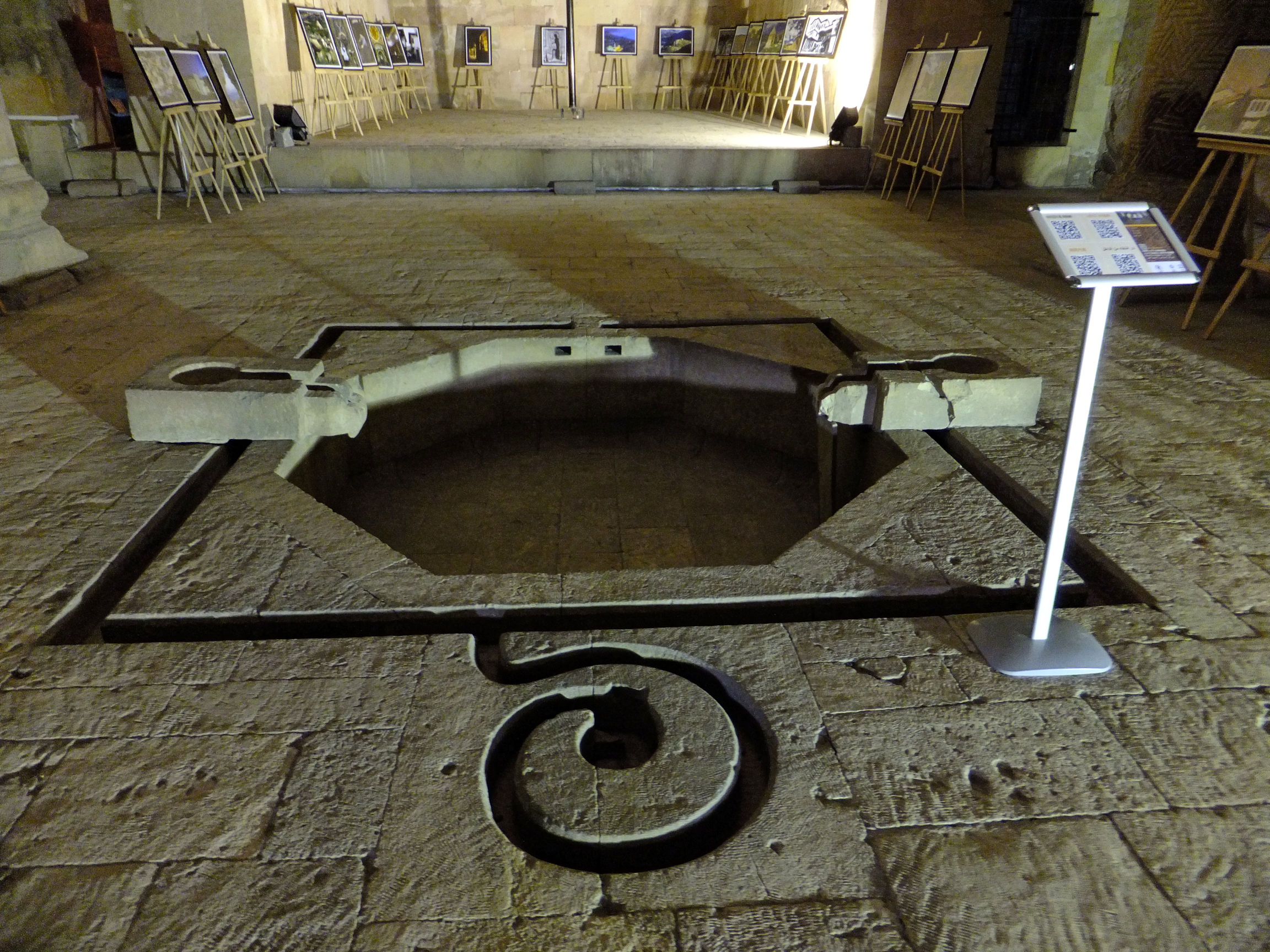
Fountain at the center of the hall

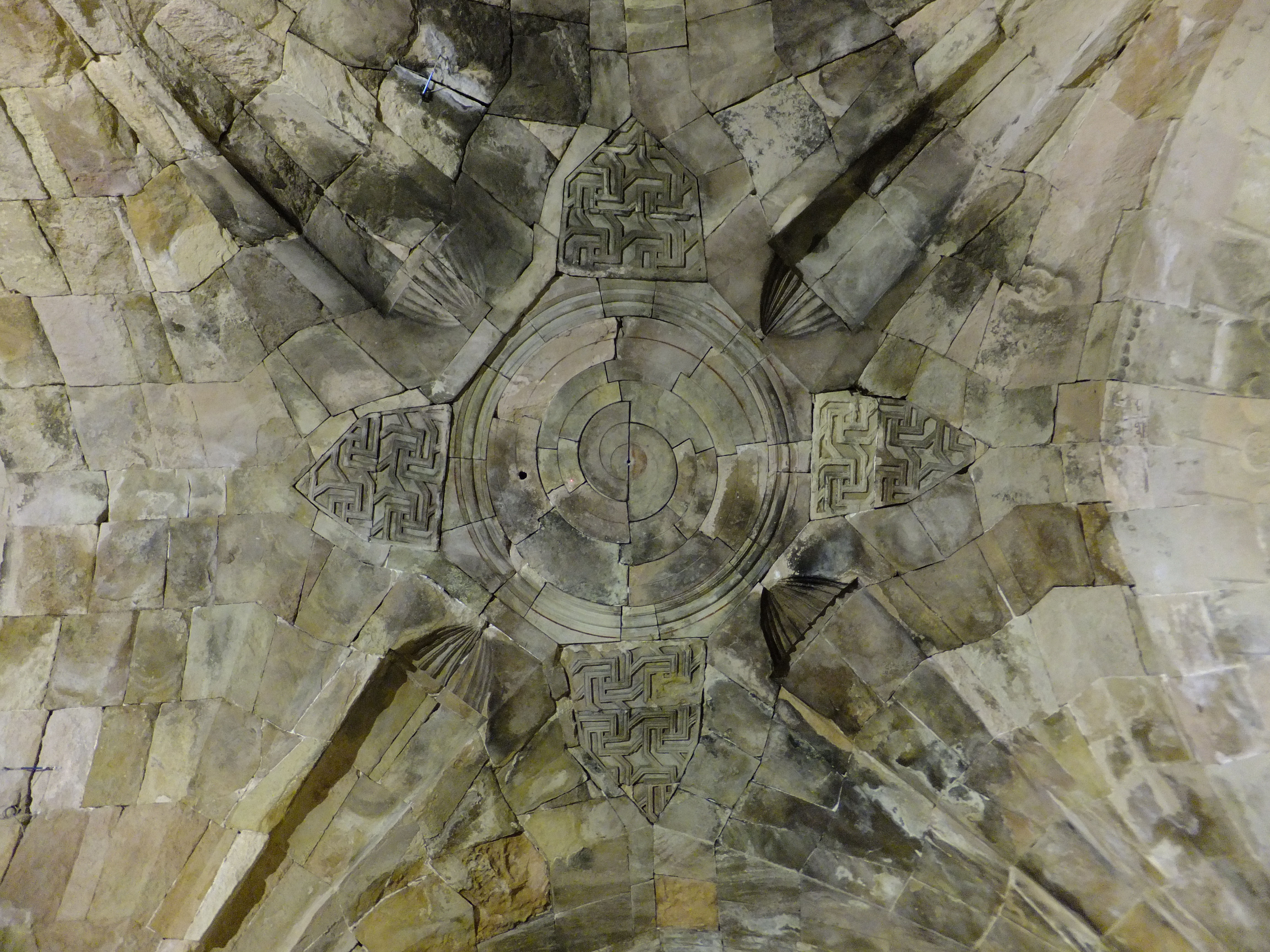
Vault of the eastern iwan (at the back of the hall)

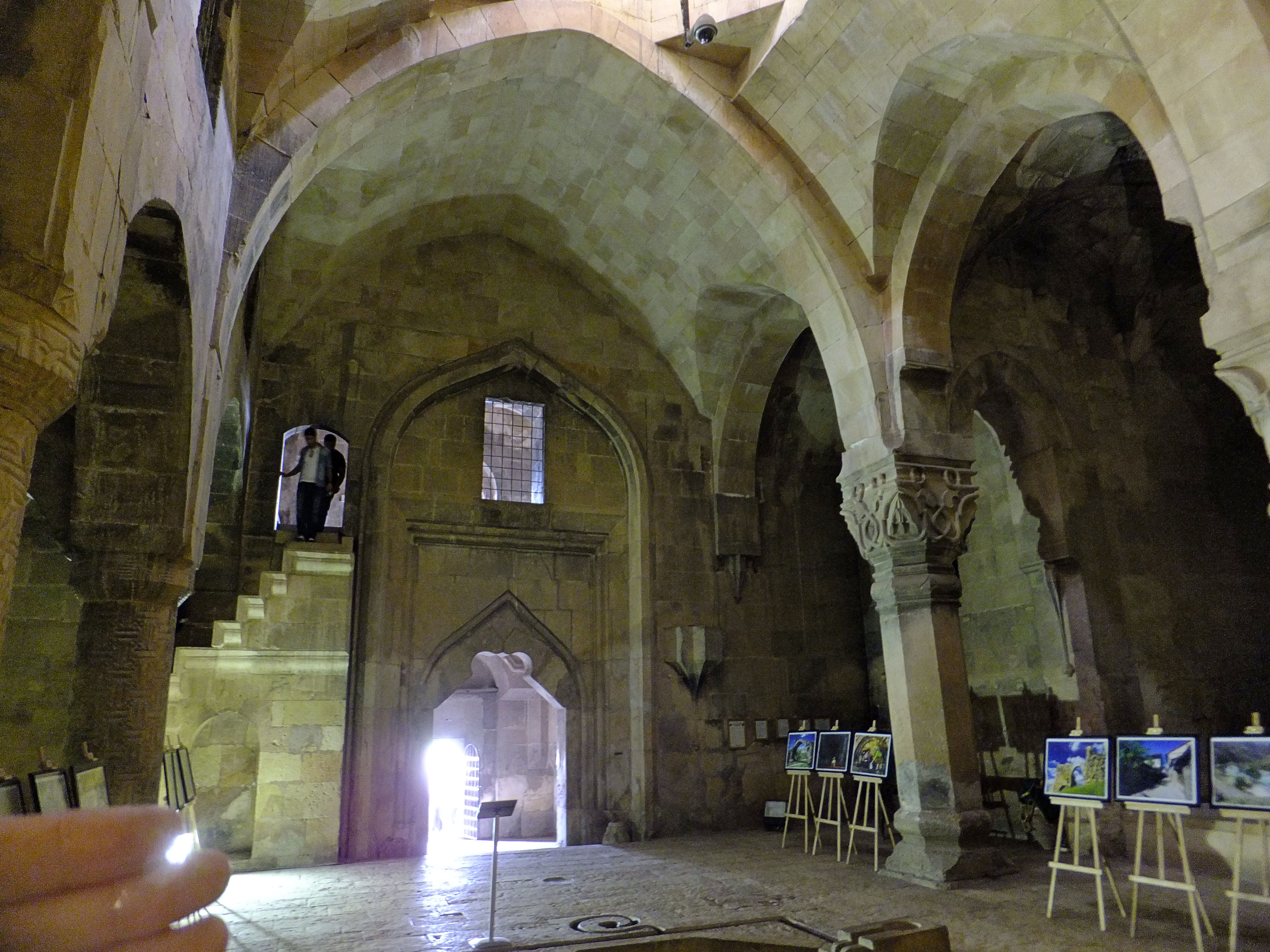
Interior of the main hall, looking west (back towards the entrance)

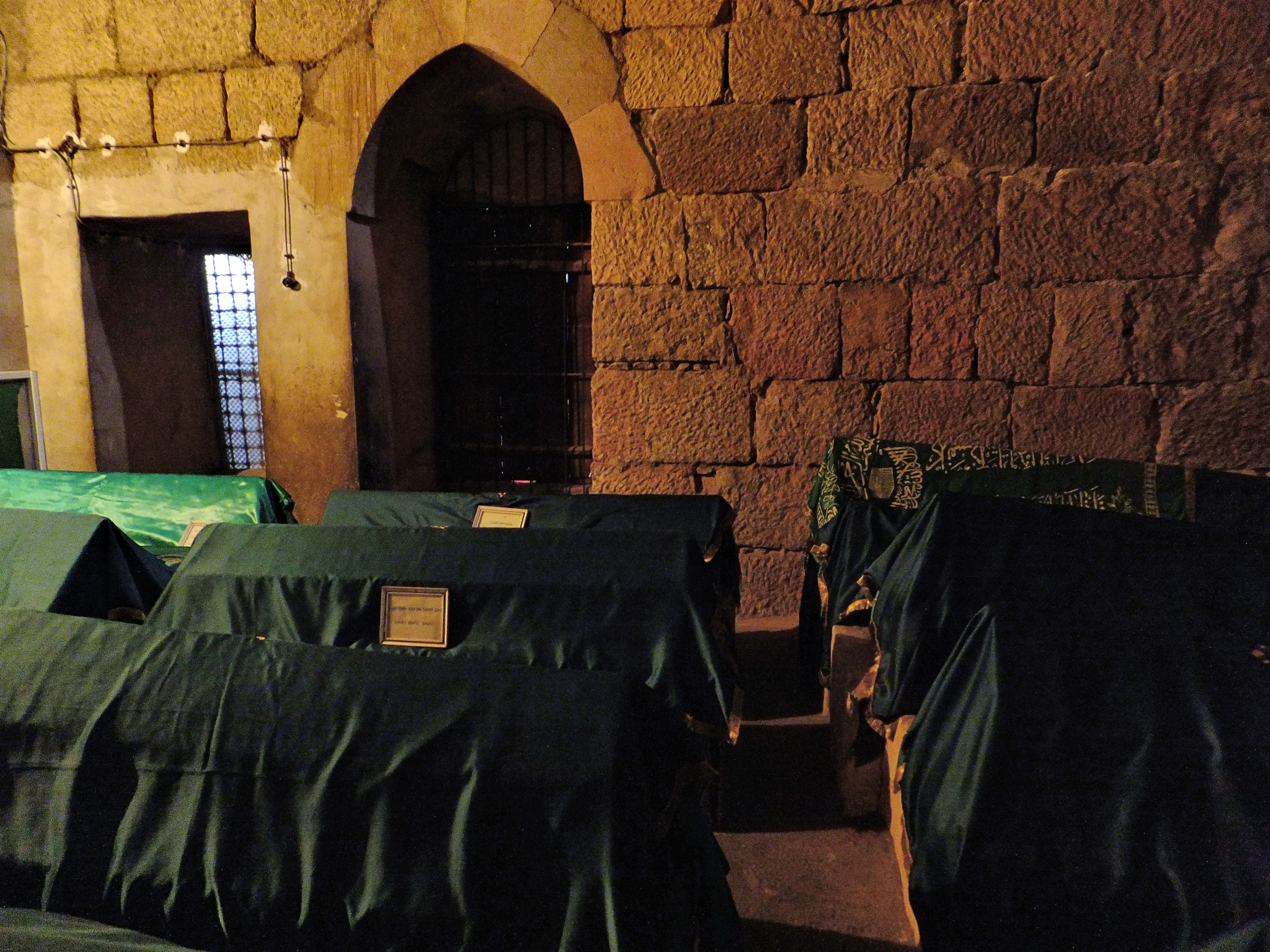
Interior of the mausoleum

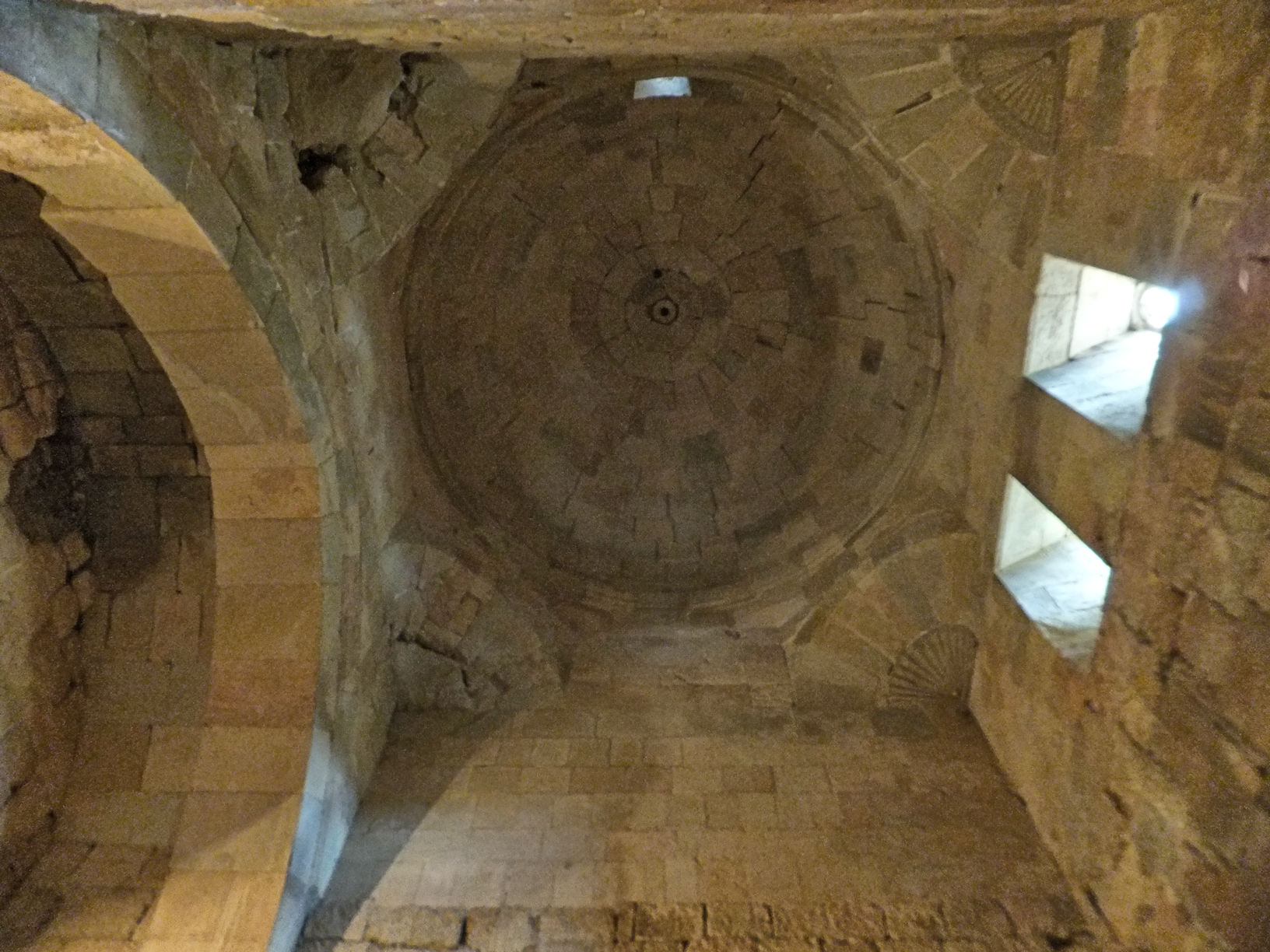
Dome of the mausoleum

== See also ==
- Seljuk star
- List of Turkish Grand Mosques
