= House of Mengüjek =

Ruling dynasty of a 12th-century Anatolian beylik

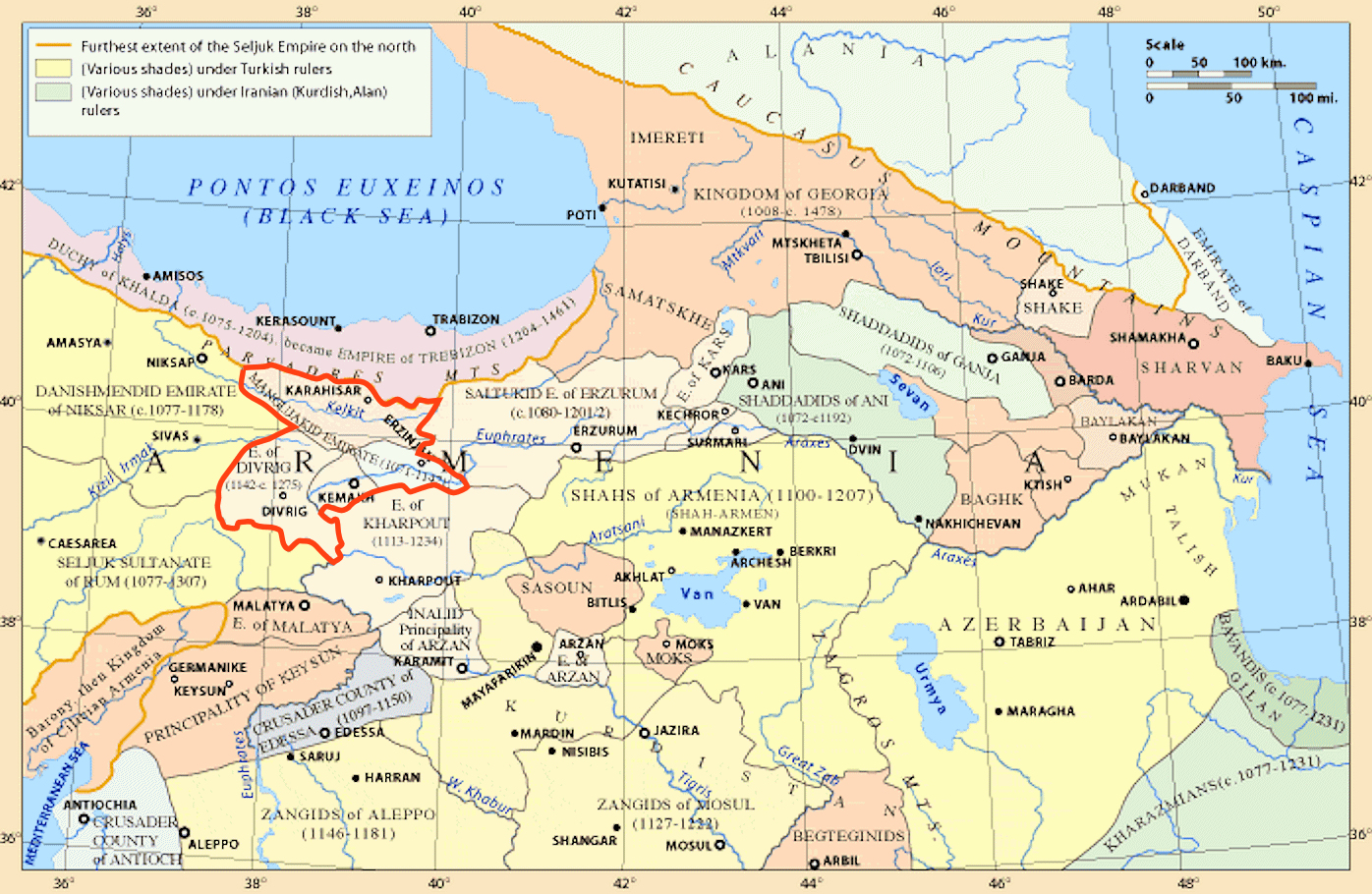
Territories associated with the House of Mengüjek.

The House of Mengüjek (Modern Turkish: Mengüçoğulları, Mengücek Beyliği or Mengüçlü Beyliği; the reigning dynasty is known as Mengujekids or Menkujakids) was a Turkish Anatolian beylik (principality) of the first period, founded after the Battle of Manzikert. The Mengujekids ruled the regions of Erzincan, Kemah, Şebinkarahisar and Divriği in Eastern Anatolia in the 12th and 13th centuries.

== Mengüjek Gazi ==
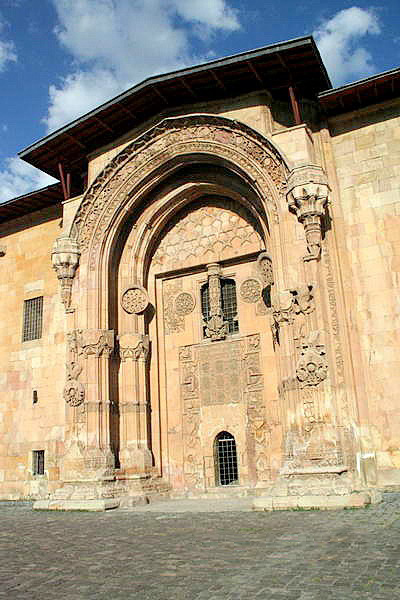
Divriği Great Mosque (Ulu Cami) portal (1228–1229)

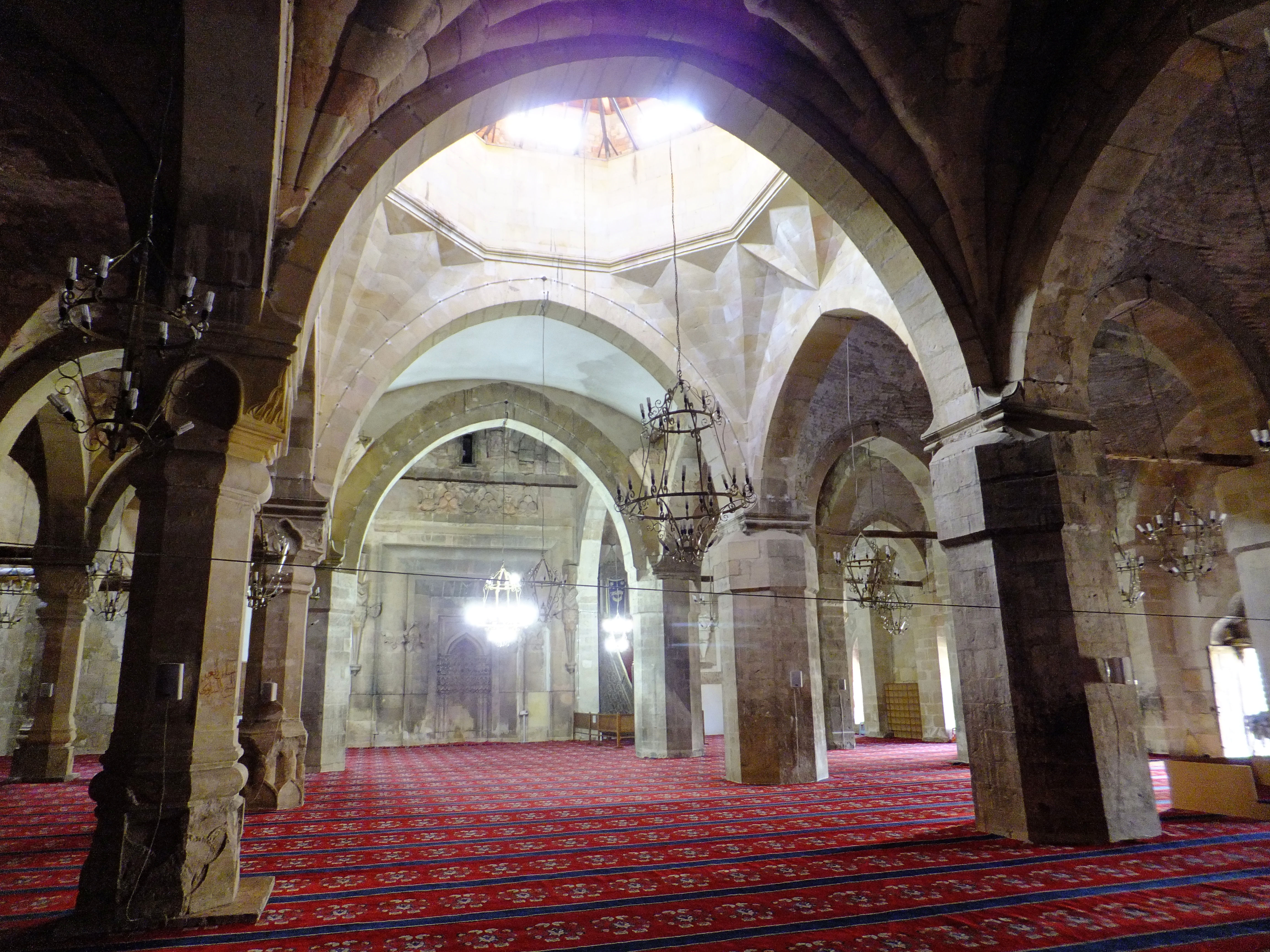
Lightwell of the Divriği Great Mosque (1228–1229).

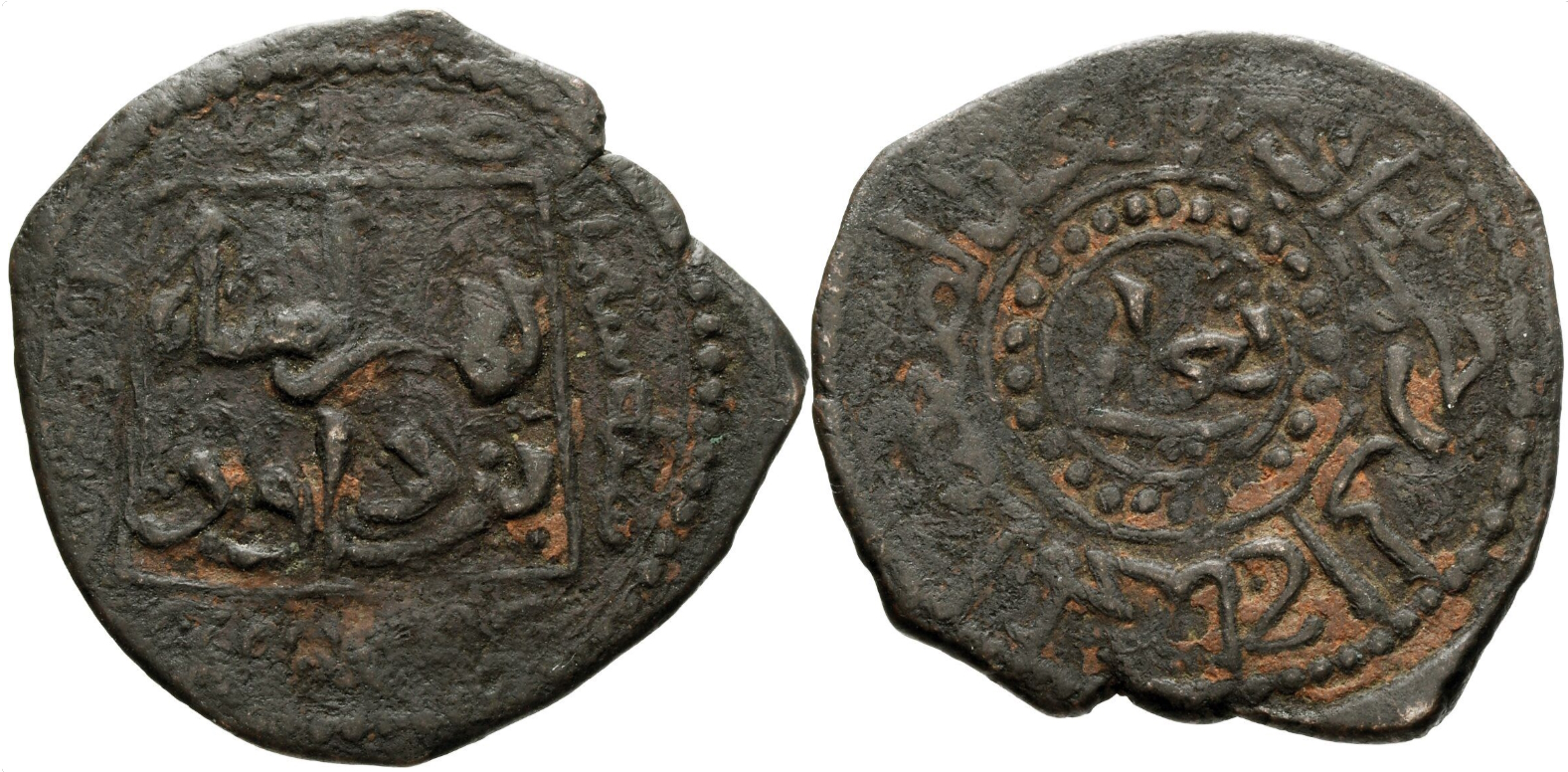
Coinage of Fakhr al-Din Bahram Shah (r.1165-1225). Erzinjan mint, dated 1203-4

Little is known about the founder Mengüjek Ghazi. He was probably one of the commanders of the Great Seljuk, and his principality seems to have been founded in the years following the battle. The beylik was split into the Erzincan and Divriği branches after the death of Emir İshak in 1142. By 1178, Behramşah, of the Erzincan branch, had proved their allegiance to the Rum Seljuks through marriage. While the Divriği branch under Şahinşah, recognized the Sultanate of Rum as their overlords by declaring it on their copper coins.

The Erzincan branch was subjugated by the Sultanate of Rum in 1228, and the Divriği branch was ended by the Ilkhanate in 1277.

== Divriği Great Mosque ==
The Mengüjek dynasty is remembered primarily for its monuments in Divriği. The Divriği Great Mosque was built in 1228 by Ahmed Shah. The adjoining medical center, or Darüşşifa, was built in the same year by Turan Melik, daughter of the Mengüjek ruler of Erzincan, Fahreddin Behram Shah. Both buildings are on UNESCO's World Heritage List.

== Numismatics ==
Sayf al-Din Şahinşah's coinage, of which there are three known varieties in copper, captures the essence of Seljuk dominance as it was felt in Divrigi in late twelfth-century Anatolia. The earliest type, which dates to 1171–2, is inscribed with Şahinşah's name on the reverse and Kilij Arslan II's name and title on the obverse. This coin was most likely indicates a numismatic symbol of servitude to Kilij Arslan II, during the time Şahinşah seized control in Divrigi. Although it is not dated, a second type of Şahinşah coin lacks the name of the Seljuk sultan. This type likely refers to the time just after Kilij Arslan II's death in 1192, when the sultan's sons engaged in a civil war for the Seljuk throne.

== Rulers ==
- Mengüjek Gazi (1072–1118)
- İshak (1118–1142)

Branch of Erzincan

- Davudşah (1142–1162)
- Süleymanşah (1151–1162)
- Fahrettin Behramşah (1162–1225)
- Alaeddin Davudşah II (1225–1228)

Branch of Divriği

- Süleyman (1142–1162)
- Şahinşah (1162–1198)
- Süleyman II (1198–1227)
- Ahmetşah (1227–1251)
- Melik Salih (1251–1277)

== Genealogy of House of Menguchek ==
House of Menguchek

Menguchekid Beylik
Menguchekid Beylik of Erzincan
Menguchekid Beylik of Divrği

Menguchek r. 1072–1118
Ishaq r. 1118–1142
Dawud I r. 1142–1162	Sulayman I r. 1142–1162
Bahram r. 1162–1225	Shahin r. 1162–1198
Dawud II r. 1225–1228	Sulayman II r. 1198–1227
Ahmad r. 1227–1251
Salih r. 1251–1277

== See also ==
- Divriği Great Mosque
- Battle of Malazgirt
- Anatolian beyliks
- List of Sunni Muslim dynasties
