= Ahmetşah =

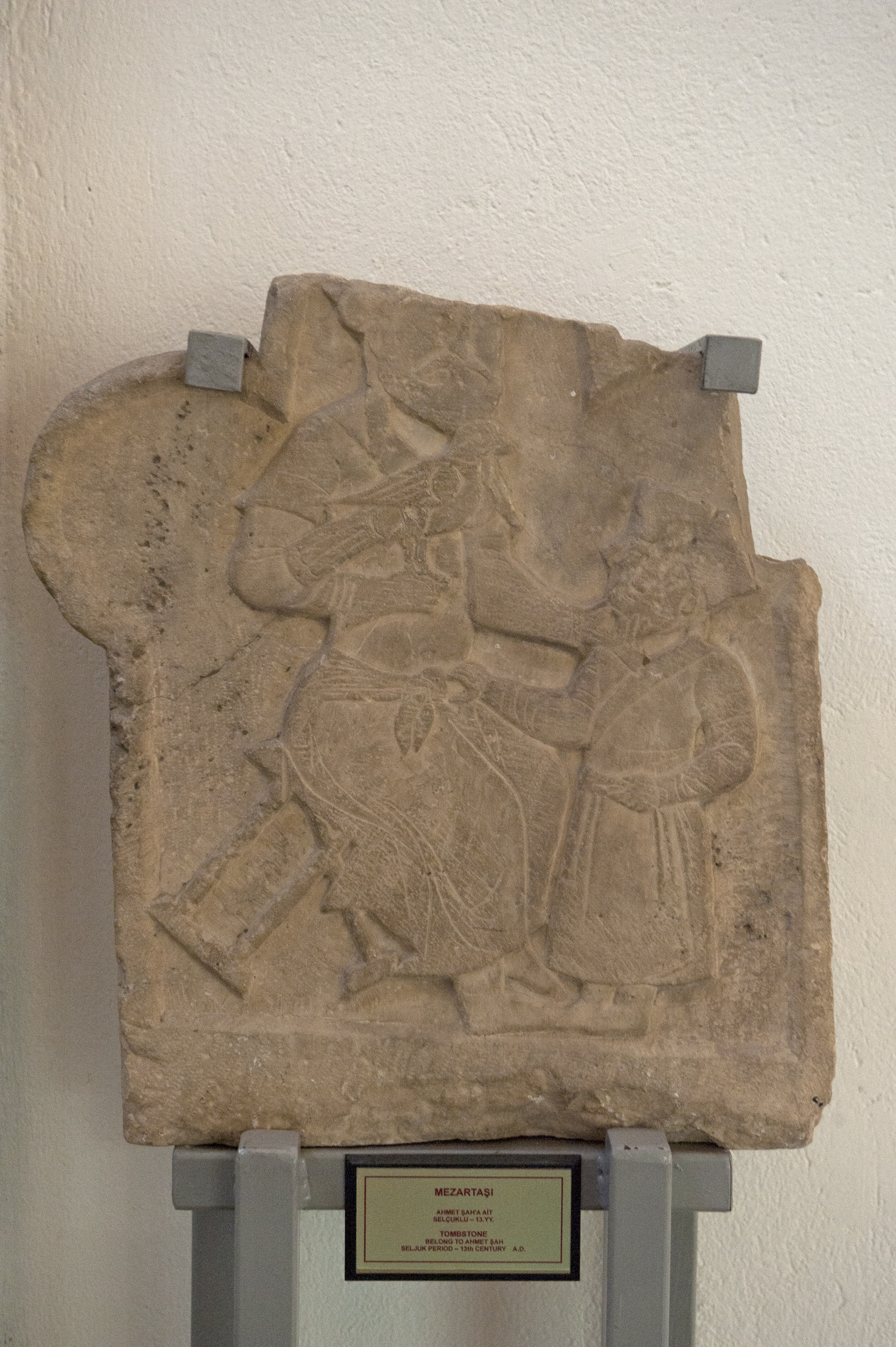
Seljuk Ahmet Şah tombstone, Ince Minare Medrese Museum

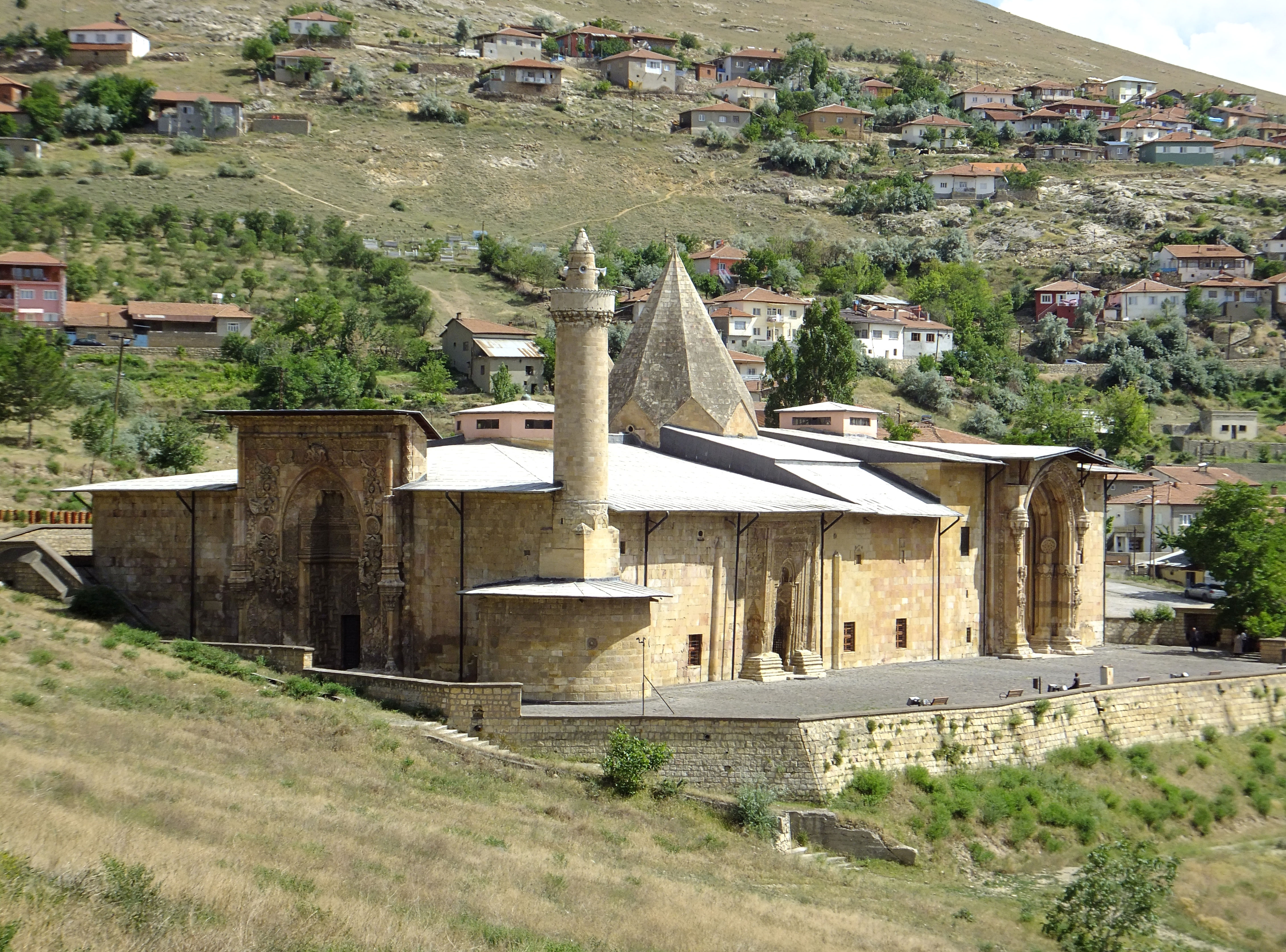
The mosque and hospital complex, seen from the north, with the upper town of Divriği in the background (photo from 2014)

Ahmetşah (r.1227–1251), also Ahmadshāh ibn Sulaymān or Ahmed Shah, was a ruler of the Divriği branch of the Seljuk House of Mengüjek, son of Süleyman II (1198–1227). His suzerain was the Seljuk Rum ruler Alauddin Keykubad I.

He was notably the patron of the Divriği Great Mosque and Hospital, built in 1228-9.

Ahmetşah was buried with 16 members of his family in the Divriği Great Mosque and Hospital.
