= Ankara Vakıf Museum =

Vakıf Museum
- Ankara Vakuf Eserleri Müzesi
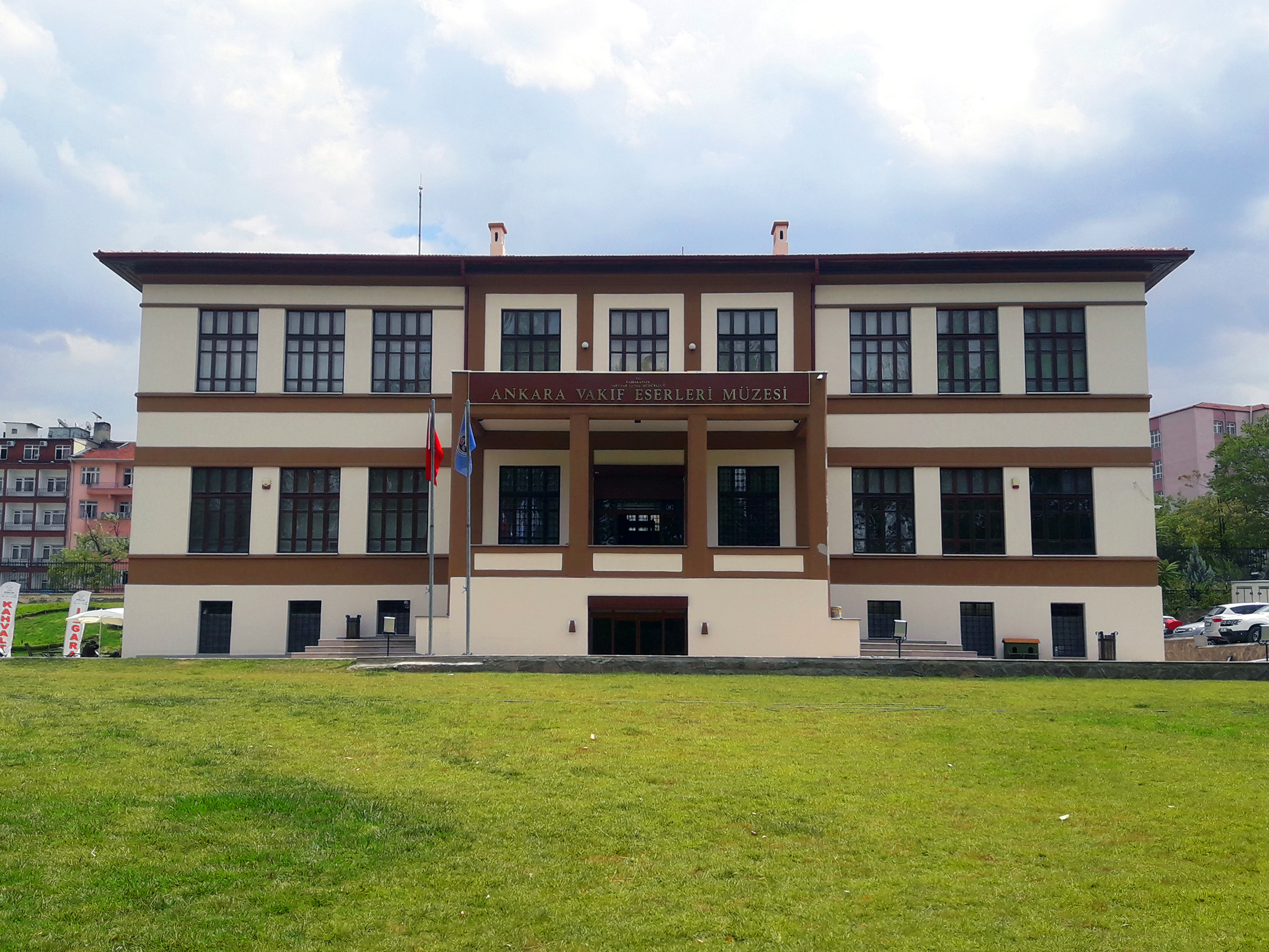
- Ankara Vakıf Museum building

- Location of the museum in Turkey.
- Established: 2007; 19 years ago
- Location: Atatürk Boulevard, Ankara, Turkey
- Coordinates: 39°56′08″N 32°51′8″E
- Type: Ethnography museum
- Collections: Rugs, carpets, tiles, hand written books, tiles, metal and wooden items, etc.

Vakıf Museum (Turkish: Ankara Vakıf Eserleri Müzesi) is an ethnography museum in Ankara, Turkey exhibiting endowed articles.

The museum is on Atatürk Boulevard in Ankara. It is to the south of Melike Hatun Mosque and to the east of Gençlik Parkı, the largest park of Ankara. Some of the other museums of Ankara such as Stamp Museum, Ethnography Museum of Ankara and State Art and Sculpture Museum are nearby. The museum building was built as a school building. It is an example of First national architectural movement of Turkey. Between 1928 and 1941 it was used by the School of Law and after 1941, it was used as the Girls’ vocational school. In 2004 it was restored and on 7 May 2007 it was opened as a museum.

== Exhibitions ==
Vakıf means "charitable foundation" and the museum is dedicated to ethnographic endowments. In the ground floor, rugs and carpets as well as various tools in carpet weaving are exhibited. In the upper floor, hand written books, tiles, metal and wooden items are on display. Relatively more recent items such as clocks and 19th-century cameras are also a part of the museum collection.

== Gallery ==
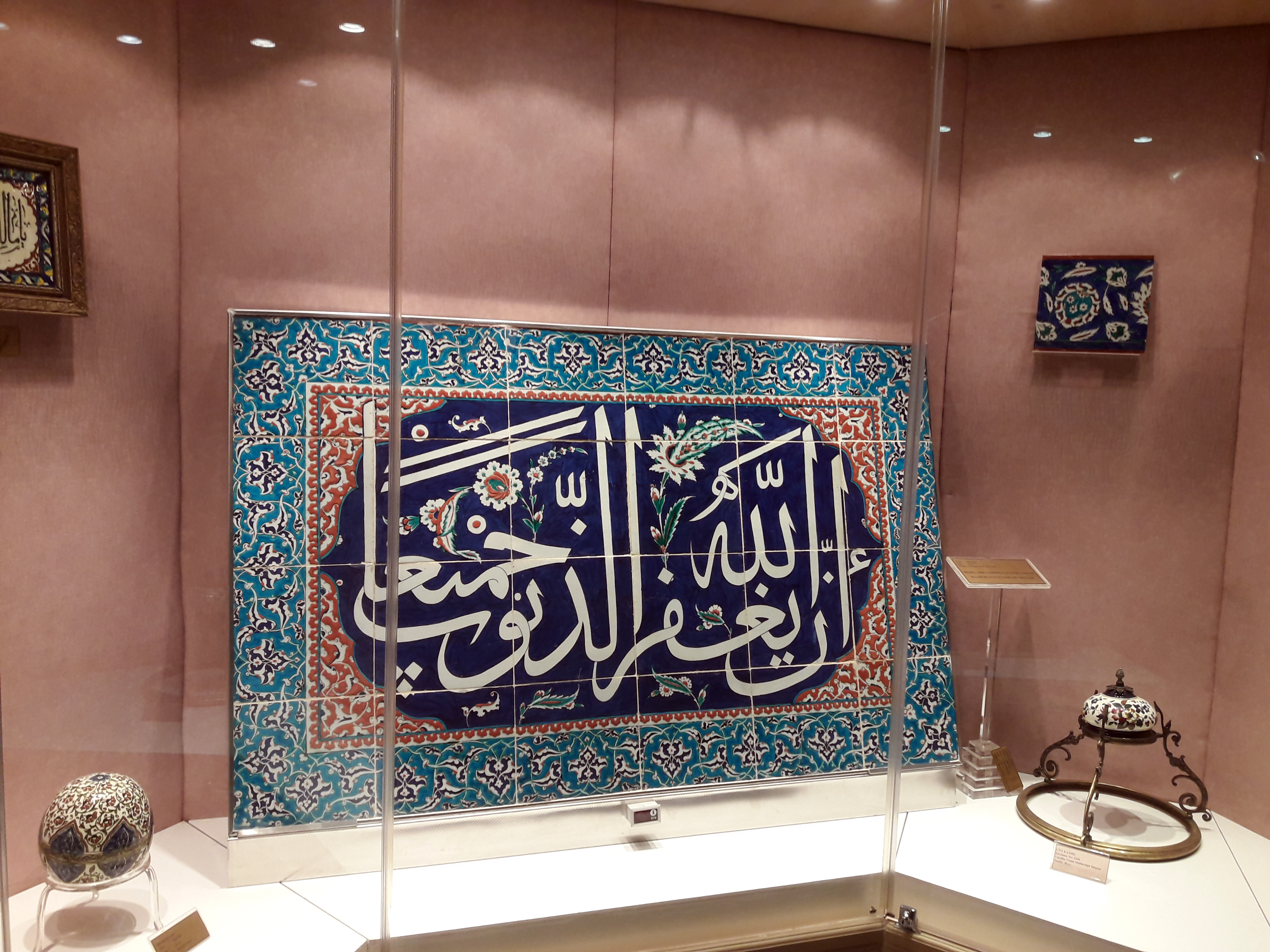
Ankara Vakıf Museum tiles

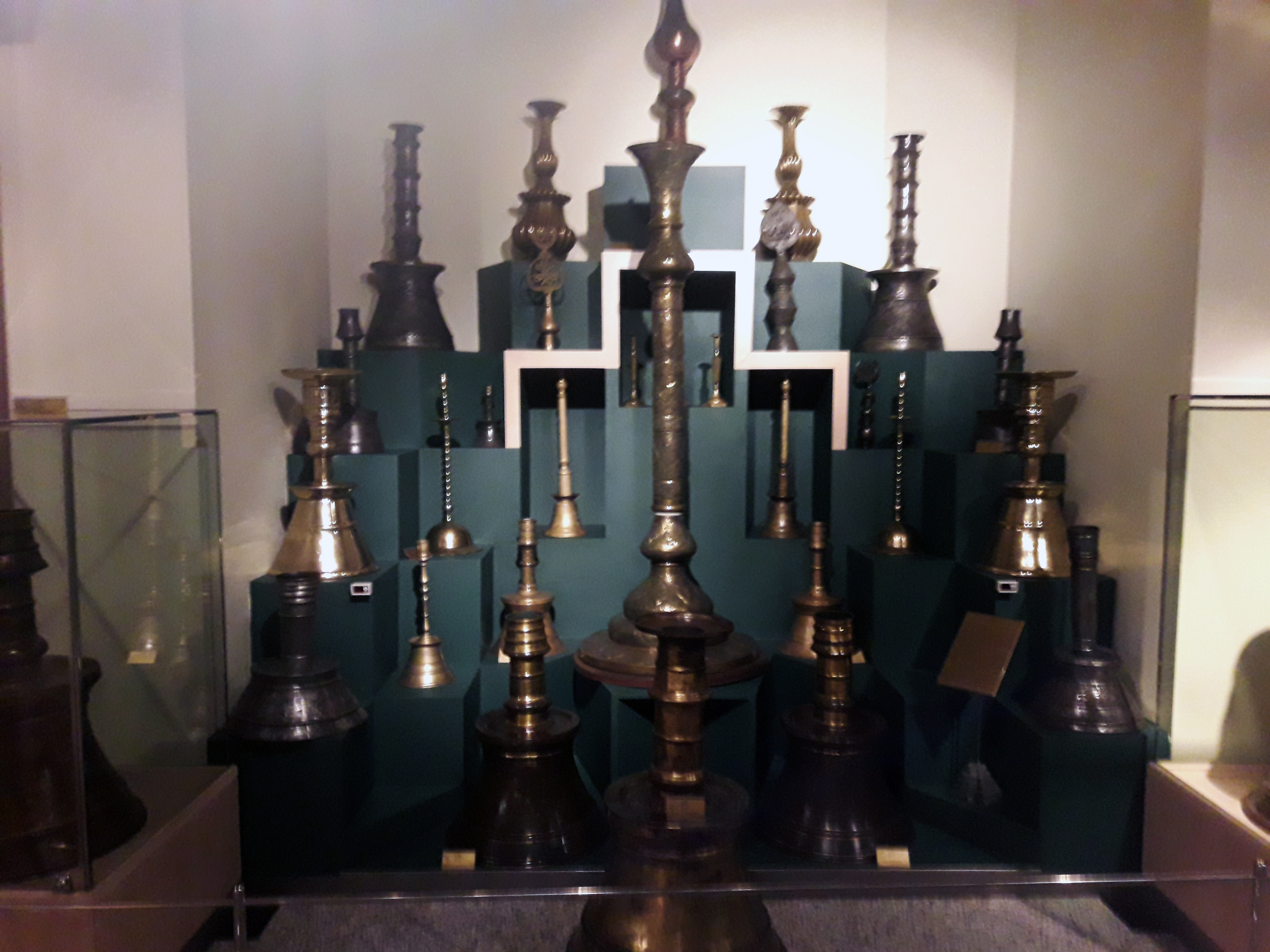
Ankara Vakıf Museum metal works

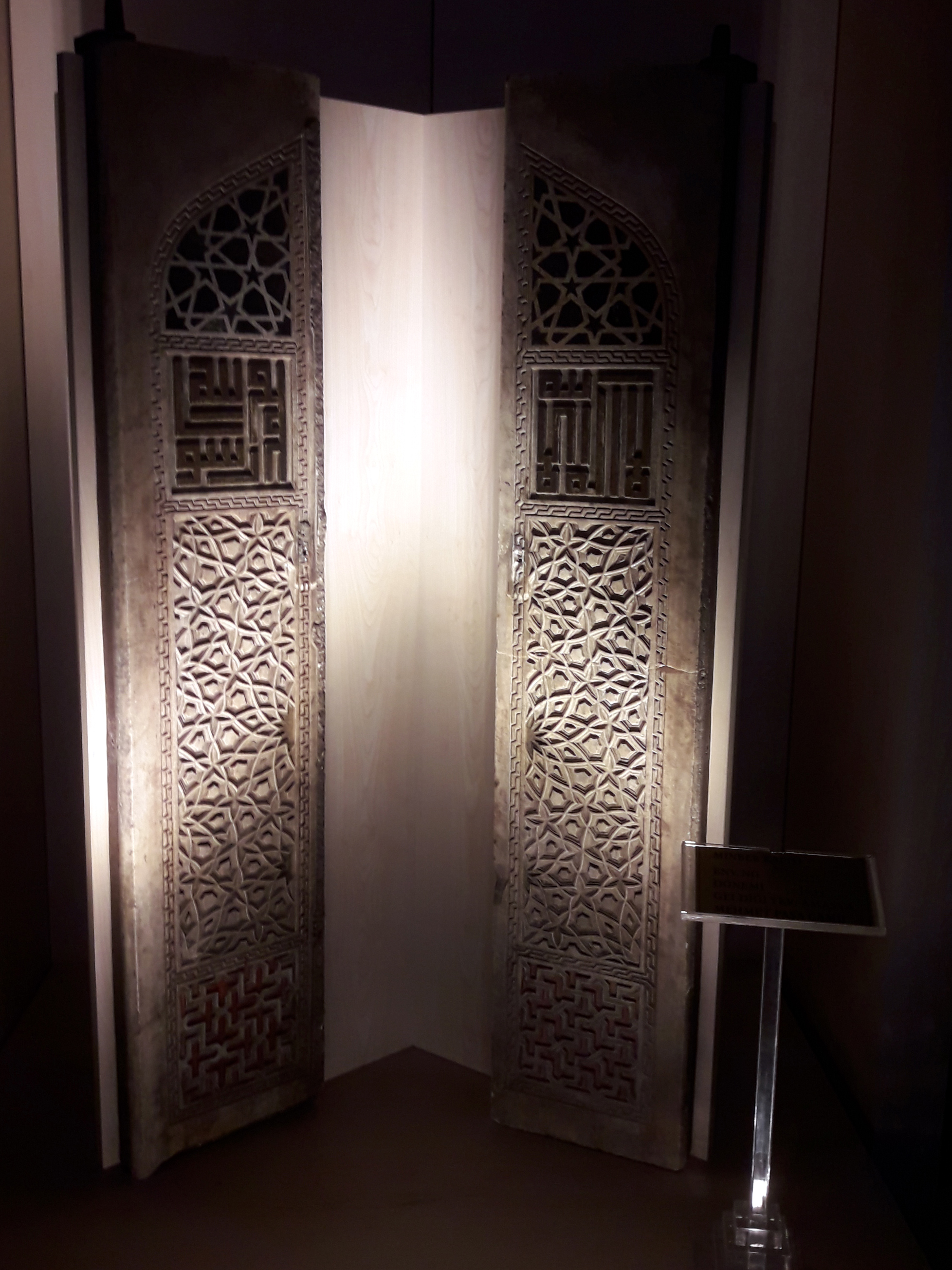
Ankara Vakıf Museum wooden work

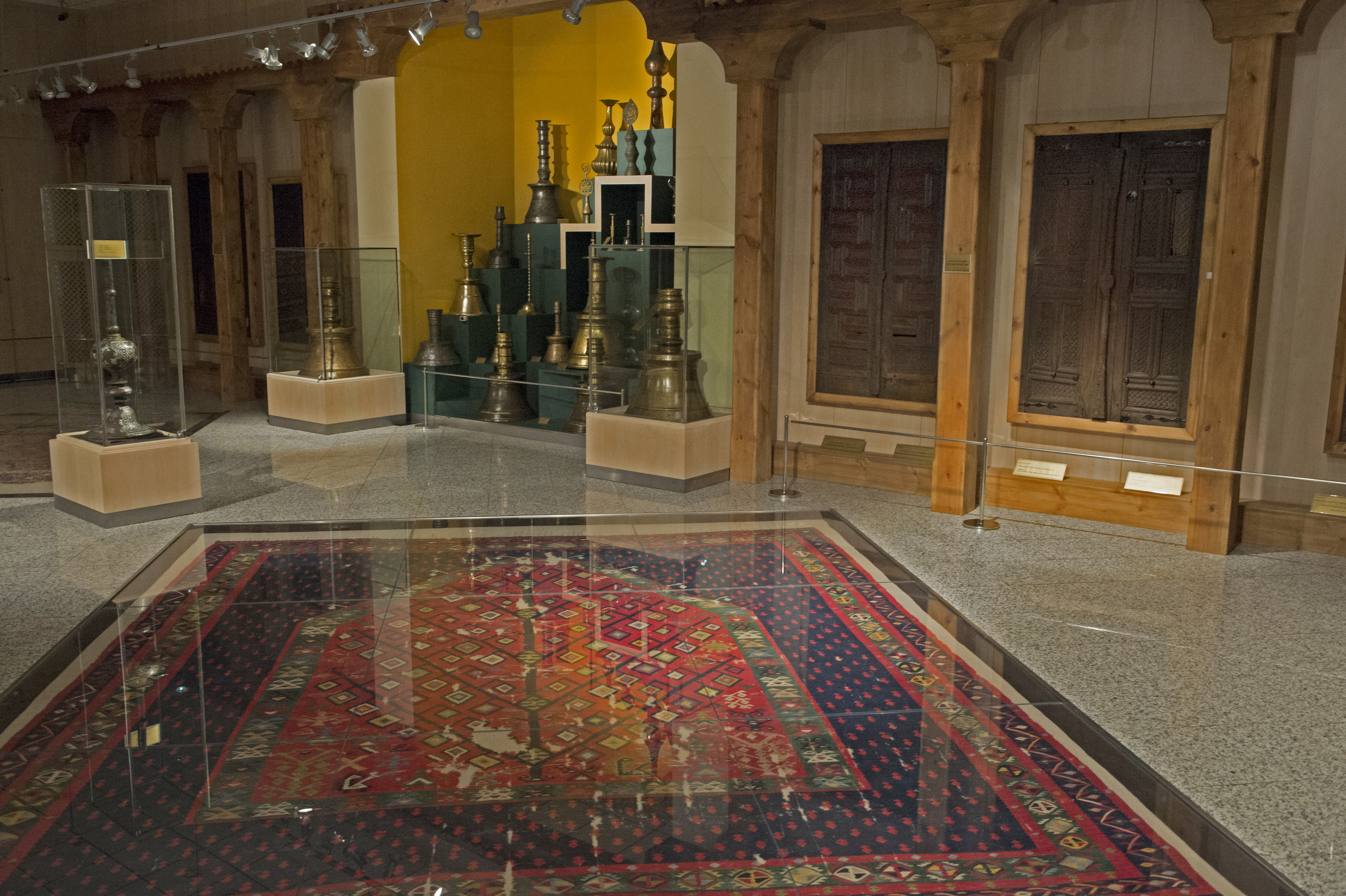
Ankara Vakıf Museum General view

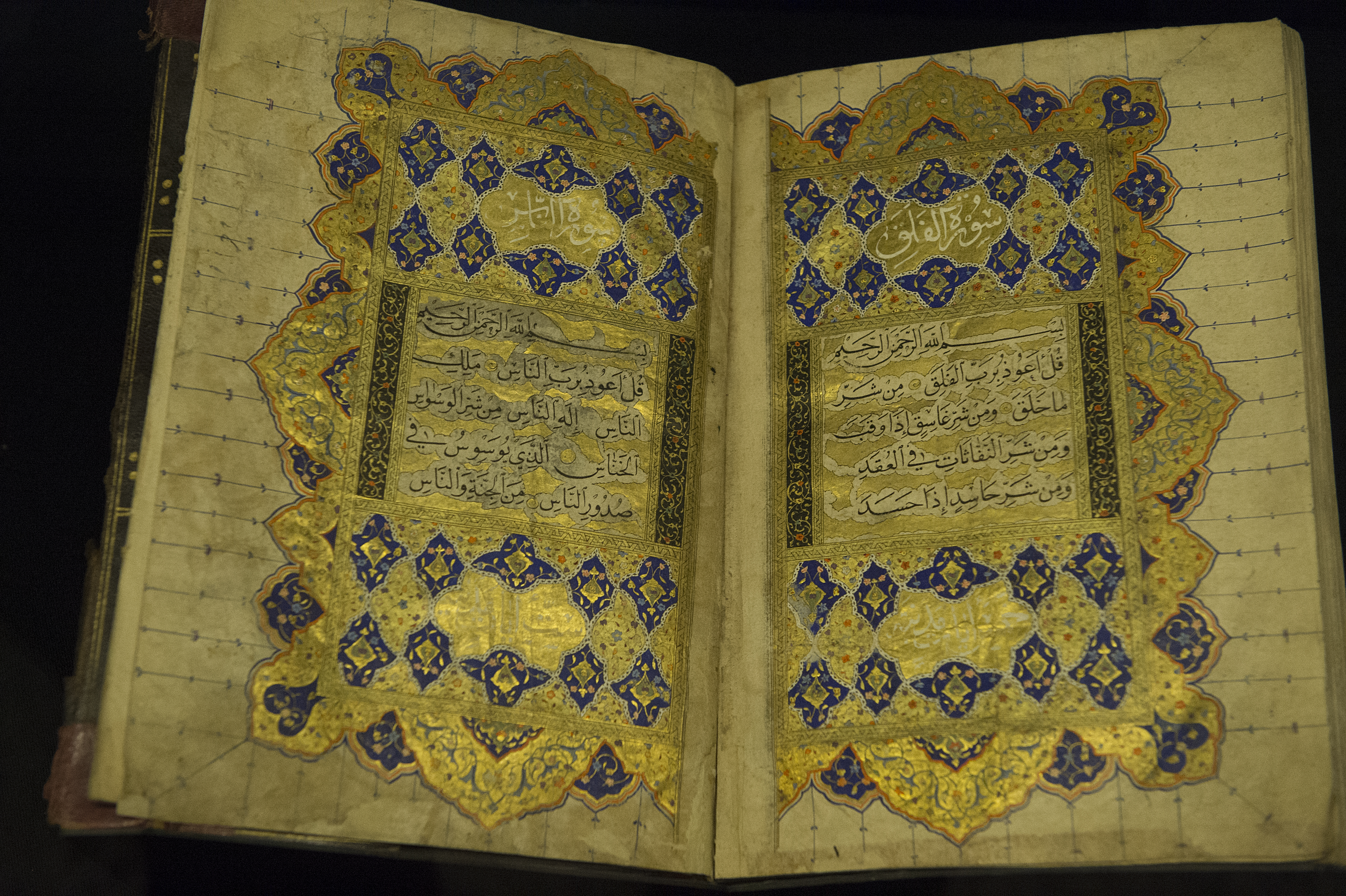
Ankara Vakıf Museum Quran

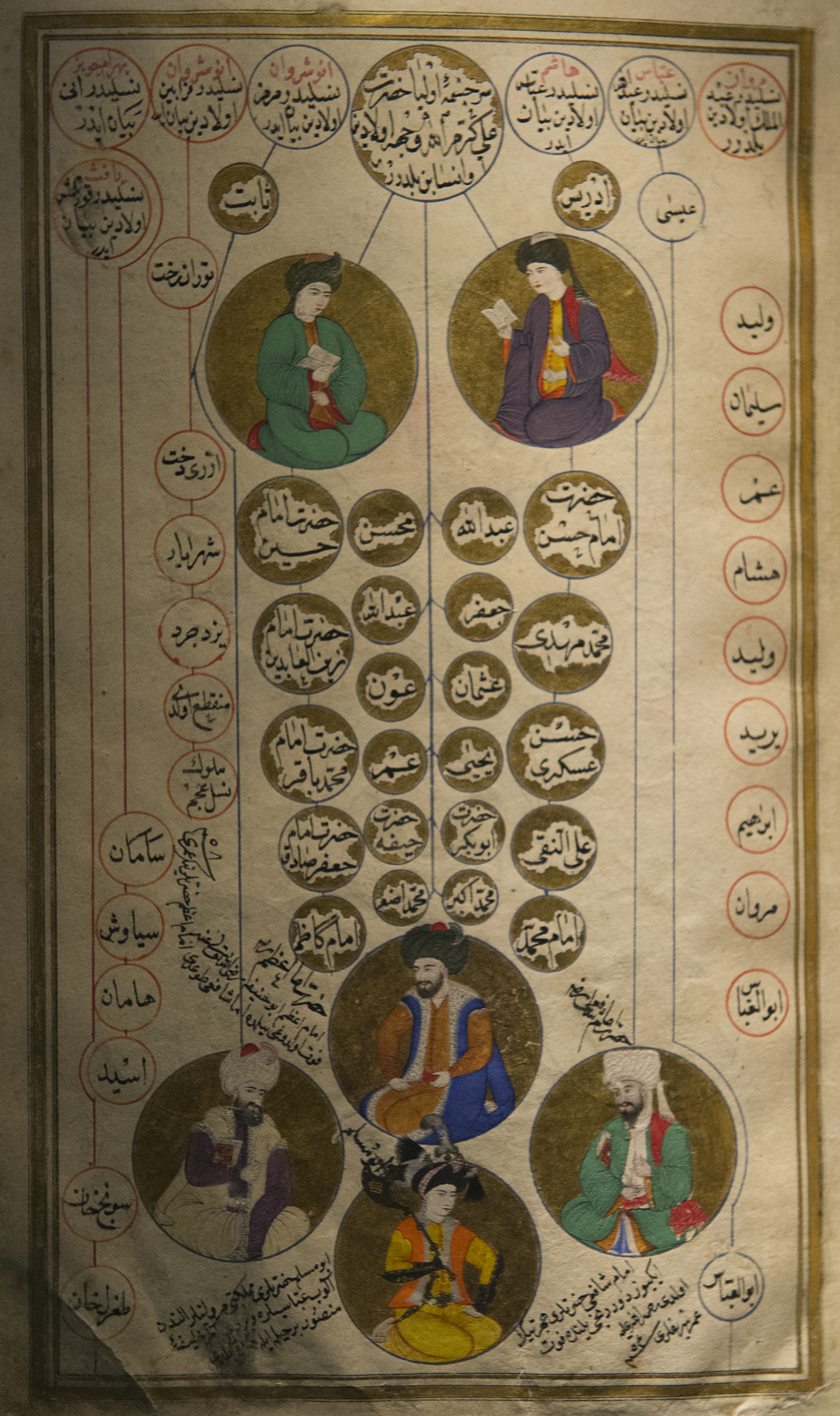
Ankara Vakıf Museum Silsile

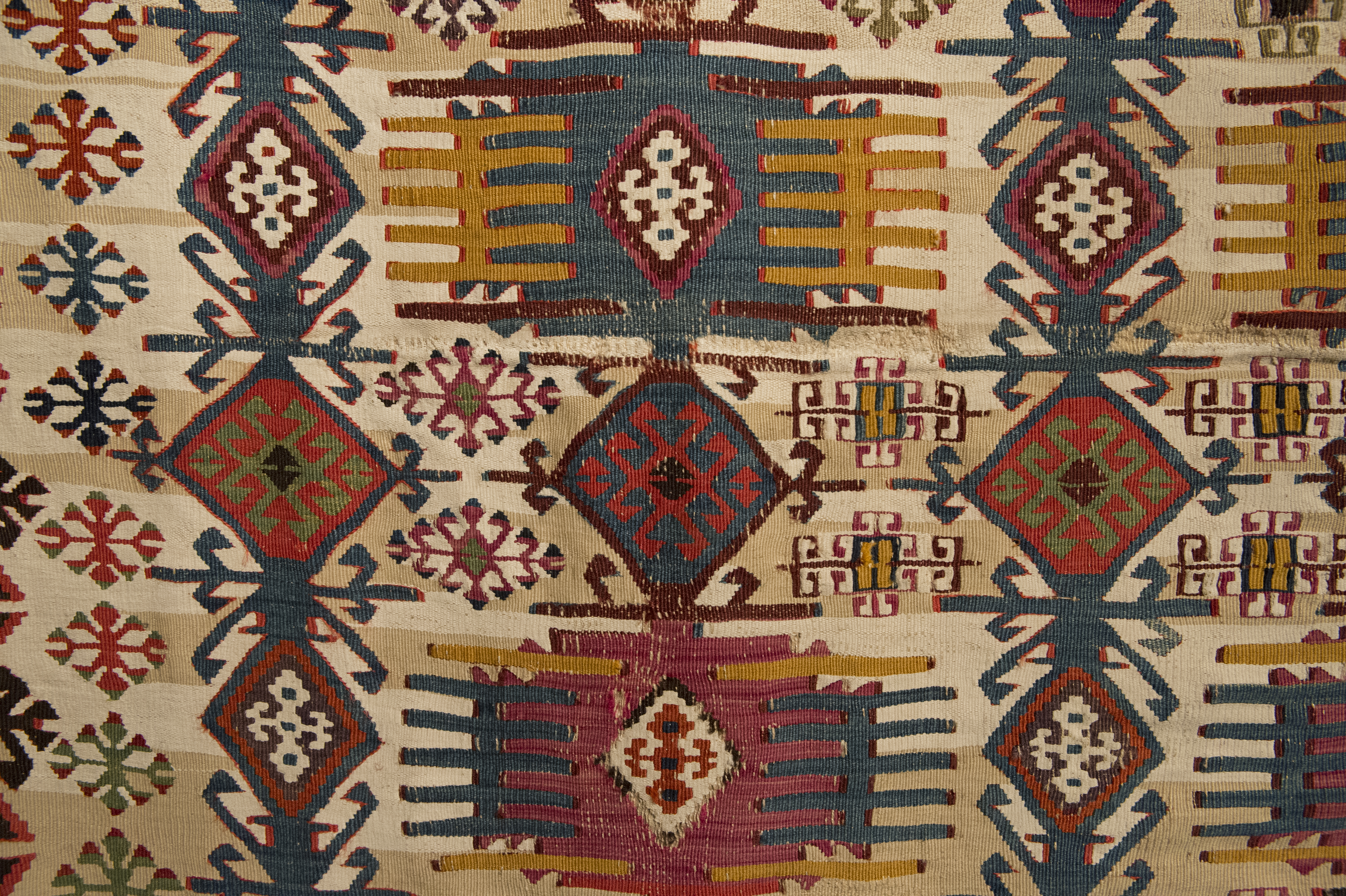
Ankara Vakıf Museum Kilim

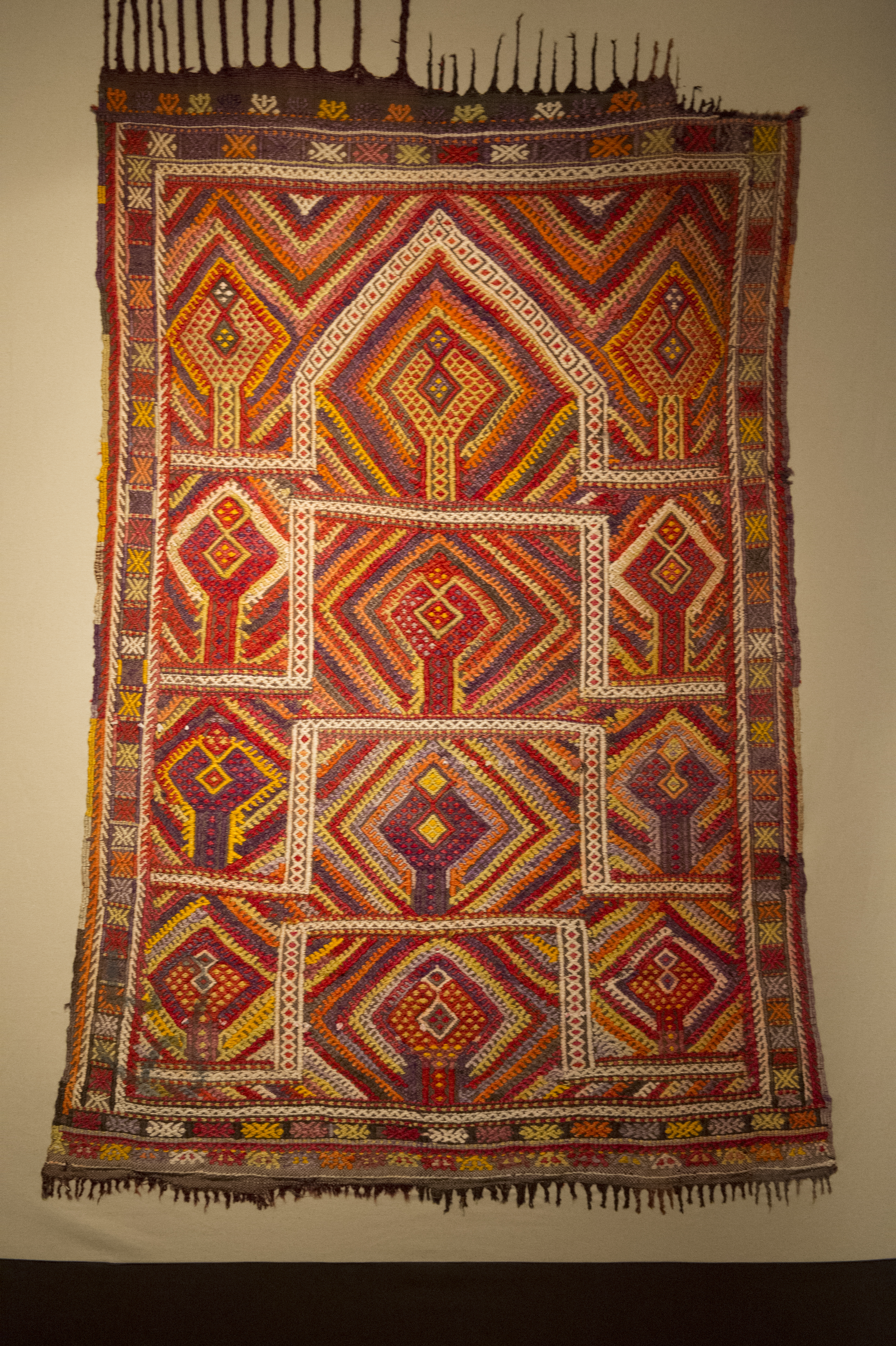
Ankara Vakıf Museum Zili

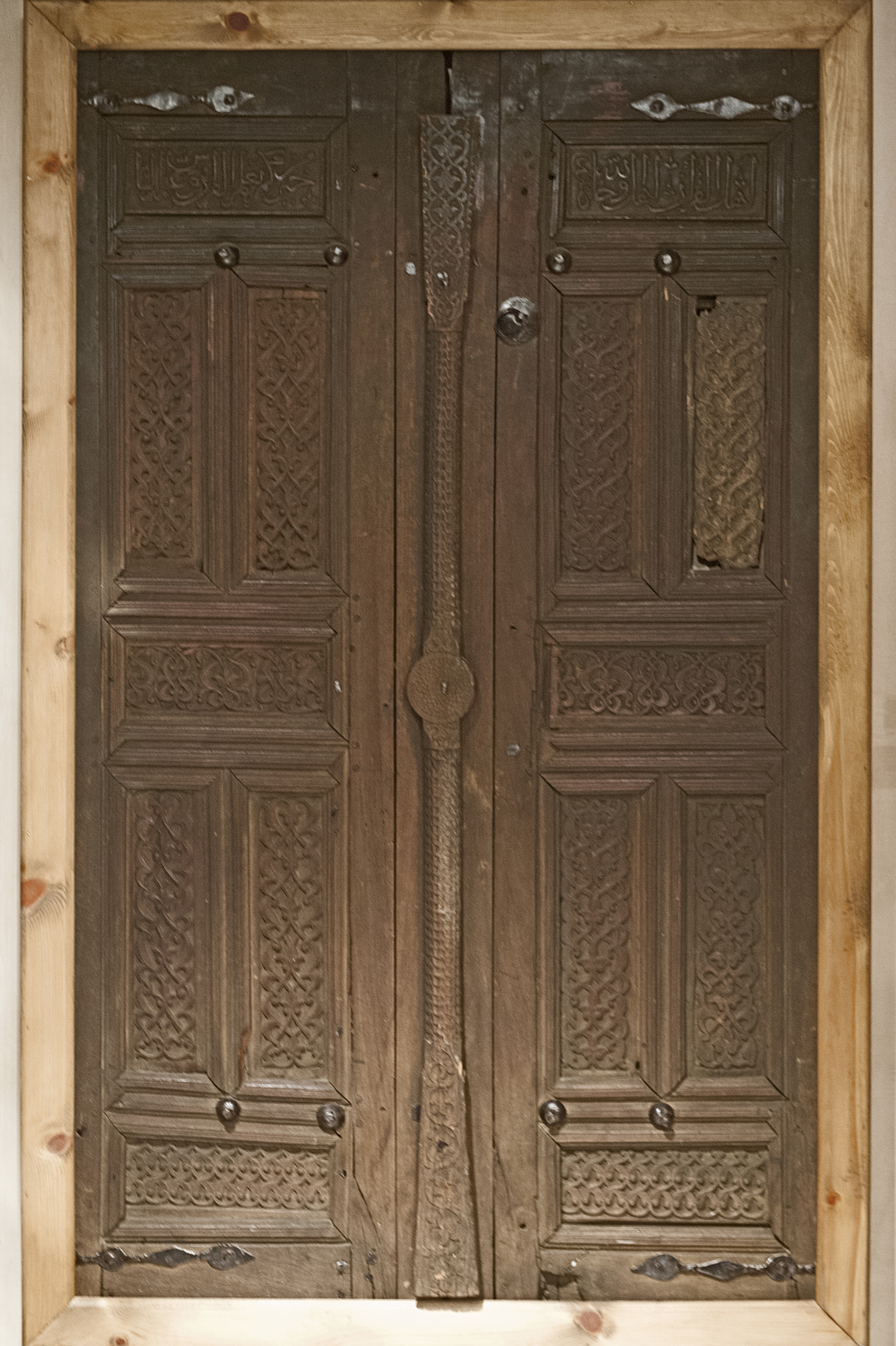
Ankara Vakıf Museum Window shutters

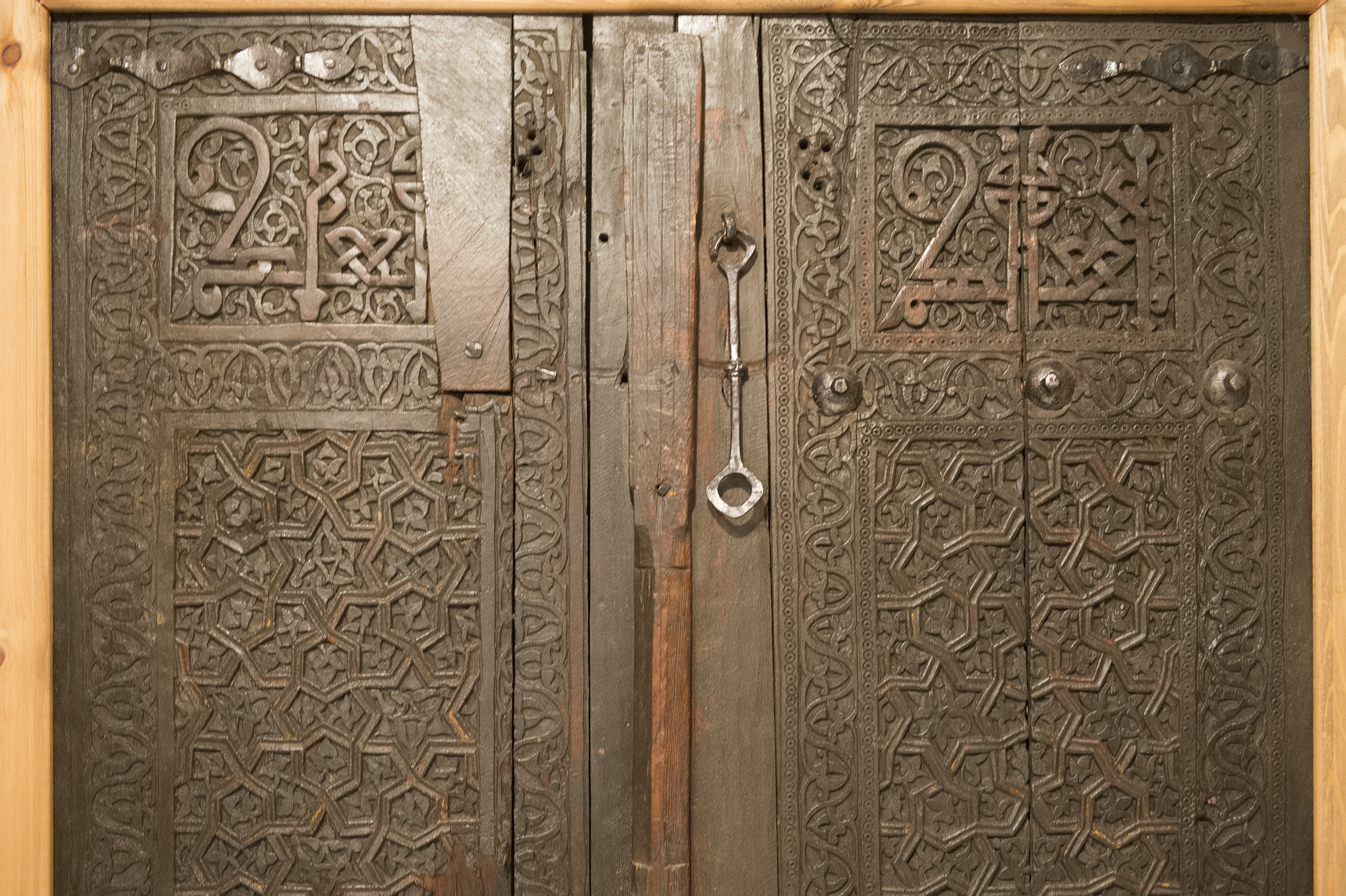
Ankara Vakıf Museum Window shutter

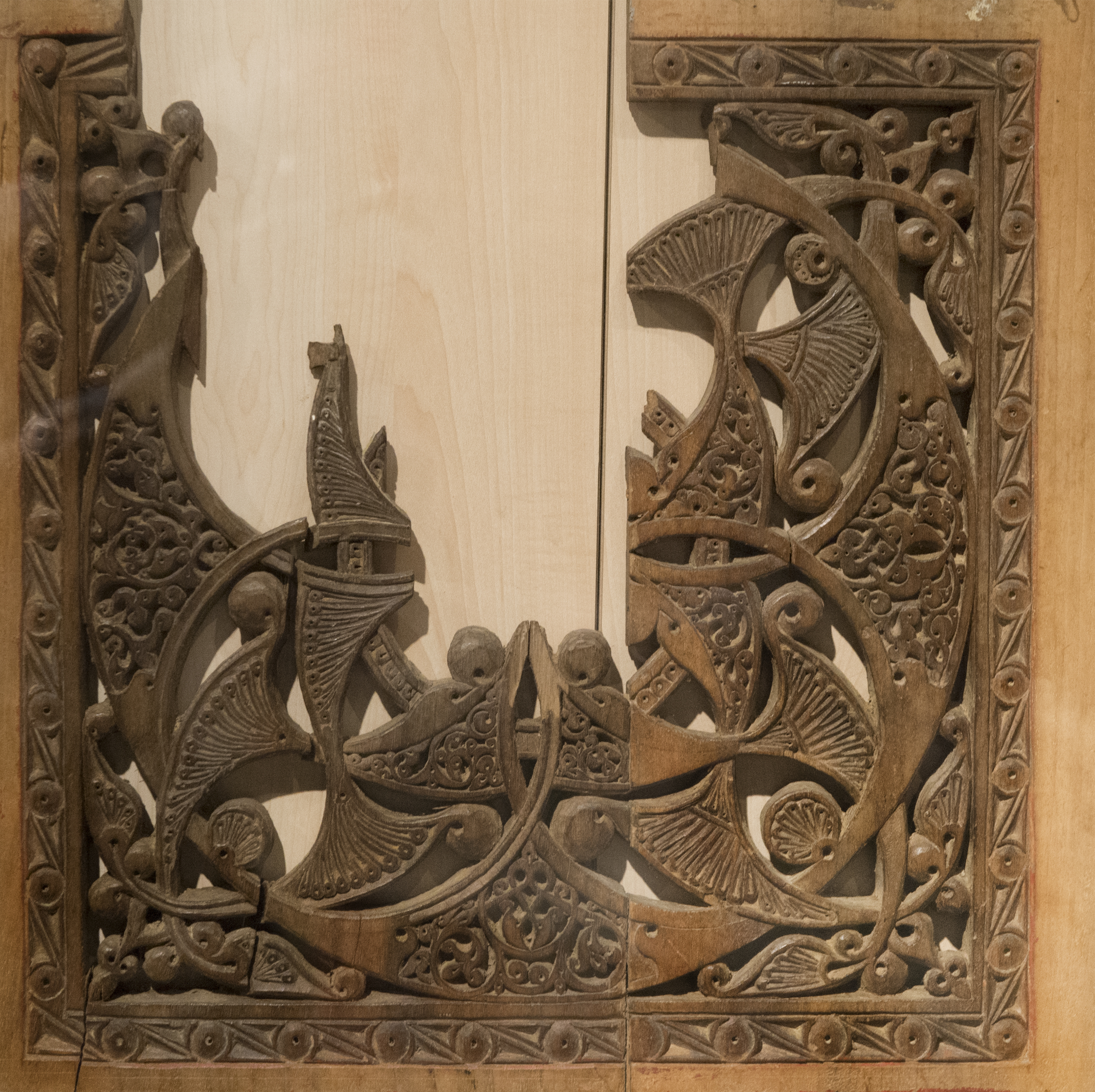
Ankara Vakıf Museum Divriği woodwork

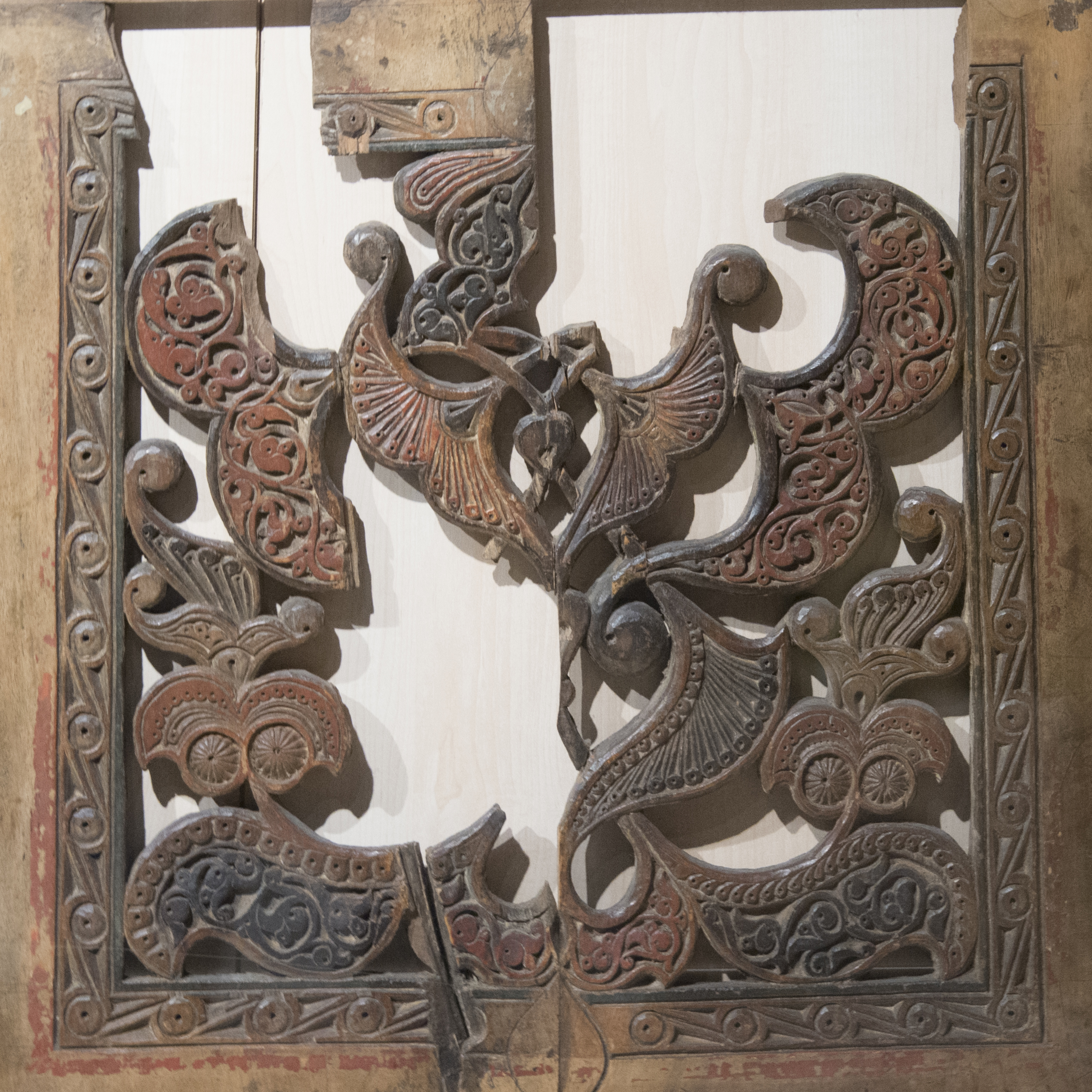
Ankara Vakıf Museum Divriği woodwork

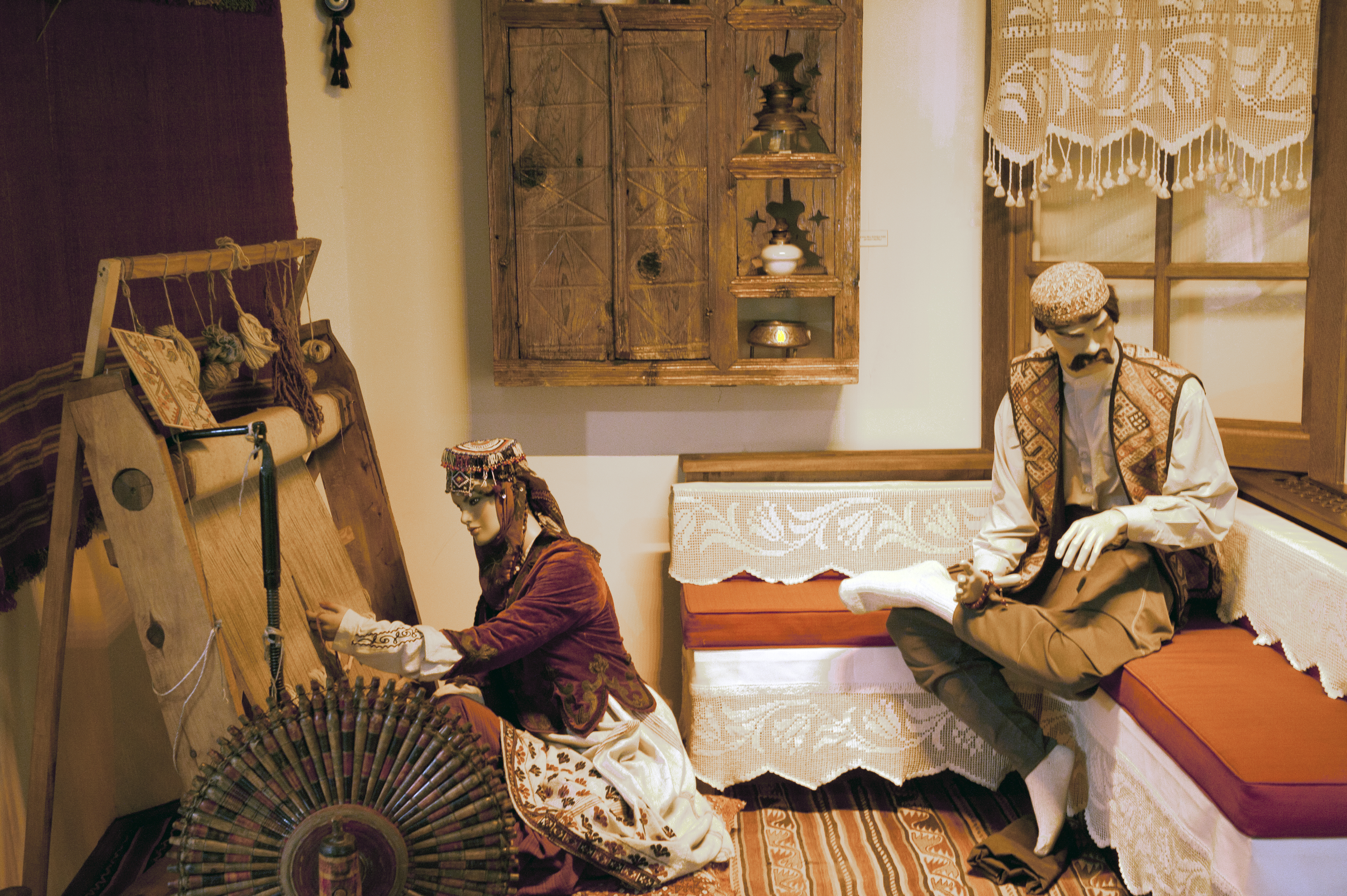
Ankara Vakıf Museum Village interior
