= Melike Hatun Mosque =

Mosque in Ankara, Turkey

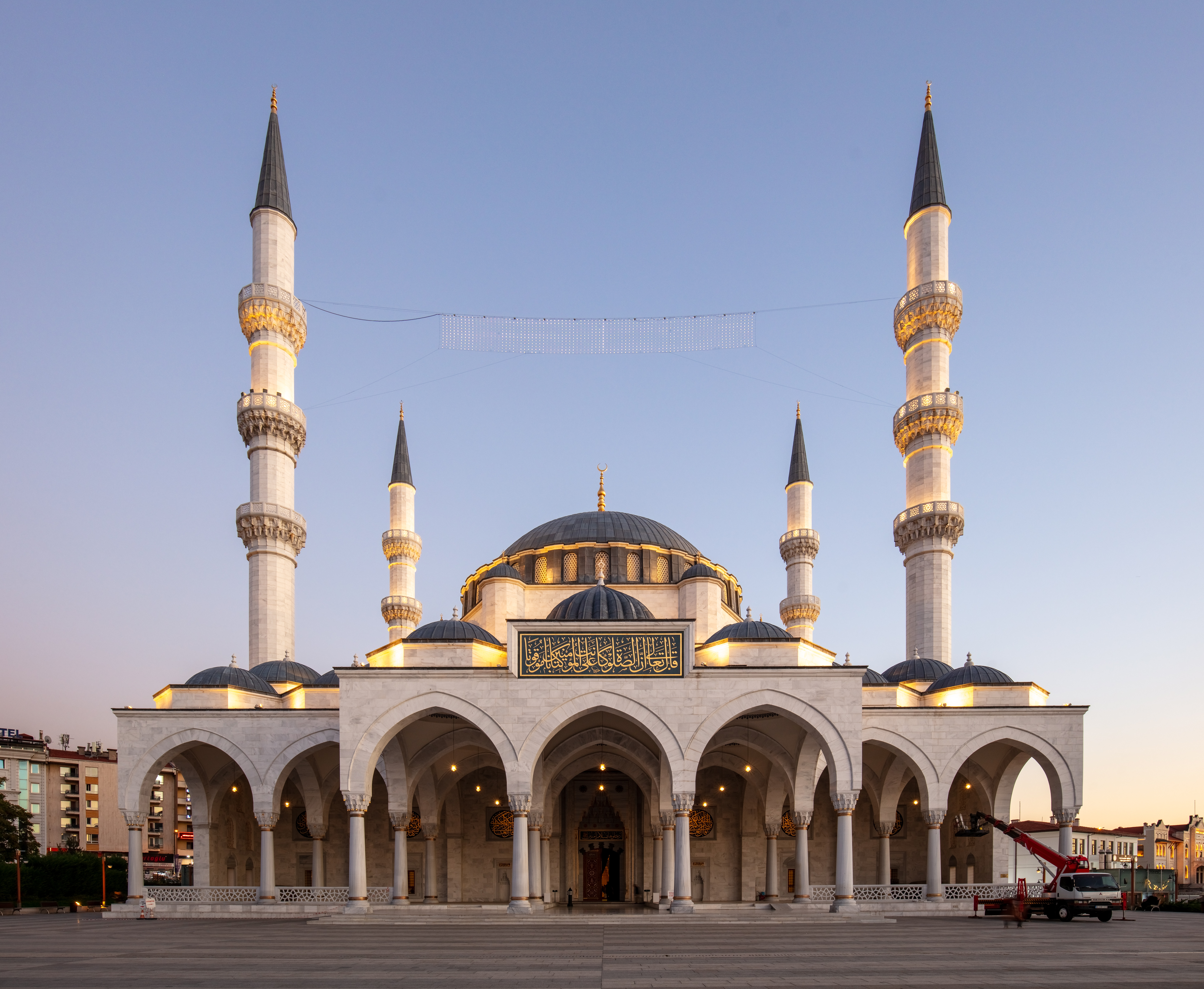

Religion
- Affiliation: Islam
- Province: Ankara Province
- Region: Central Anatolia Region
- Rite: Sunni Islam
- Status: Active

Location
- Location: Ankara, Turkey
- Interactive map of Melike Hatun Mosque
- Coordinates: 39°56′11″N 32°52′20″E

Architecture
- Architect: Muharrem Hilmi Şenalp
- Type: Mosque
- Style: Classical Ottoman type
- Completed: 2017

Specifications
- Capacity: 7000
- Dome height (outer): 47 metres (154 ft)
- Dome dia. (outer): 27 metres (89 ft)
- Minaret: 4
- Minaret height: 72 metres (236 ft)

Melike Hatun Mosque is a mosque in Ankara, Turkey. It was opened to service on 27 September 2017.

== Melike Hatun ==
The mosque is named after Melike Hatun (not to be confused with Melike Mama Hatun). Nothing definite is known about Melike Hatun, except that she was a wealthy 14th-century lady. According to Professor Hüseyin Çınar of the Yıldırım Beyazıt University, she was probably the daughter of Kayqubad III, the Anatolian Seljuks sultan (r. 1298–1302). She was the commissioner of many public buildings in Ankara. She was also the supporter of Hacı Bayram-ı Veli.

== The mosque ==
The mosque is in the old quarter of Ankara, popularly known as Hergele Meydanı. It is situated to the east of Atatürk Boulevard and Gençlik Parkı, the largest public park in Ankara. Its architect is Hilmi Şenalp.

The ground area of the mosque is 3,600 m^{2} (39,000 sq ft). It has enough room for 7000 prayers. The diameter of the dome is 27 m (89 ft) and the maximum height is 47 m (154 ft). It is a four-minaret mosque. Each minaret has three balconies (Turkish: Şerefe), and the height of each minaret is 72 m (236 ft).
