= Gençlik Parkı =

Public park in Ankara, Turkey

Ankara Gençlik Park
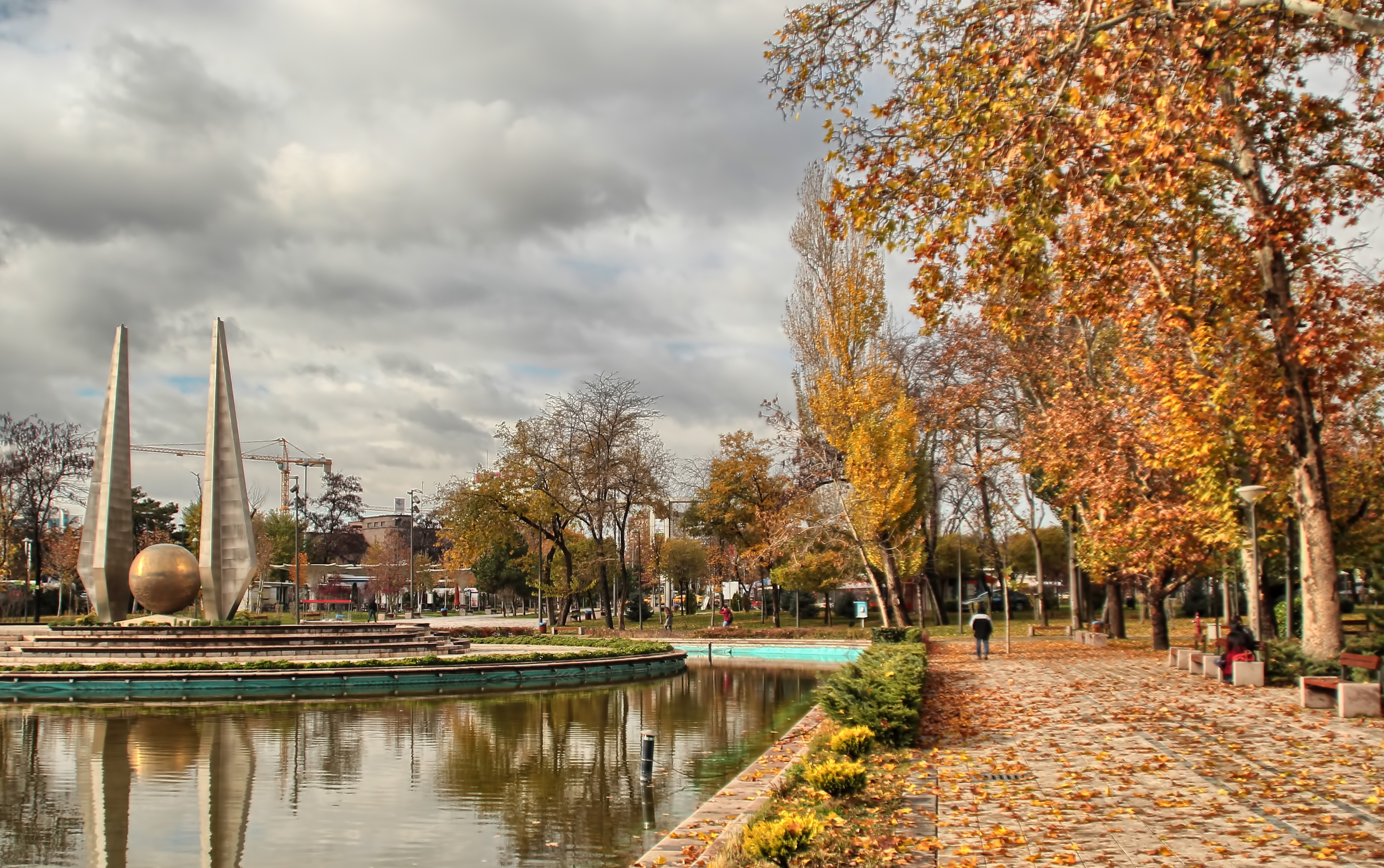

- Location within Turkey
- Location: Ankara, Turkey
- Coordinates: 39.93742°N 32.84998°E
- Area: 27.5 ha (68 acres)
- Created: 1943; 83 years ago

Gençlik Parkı (literally Youth Park) is a public park in Ankara, Turkey.

== Geography ==
The 27.5 ha (68 acres) park is almost at the center of Ankara. It is surrounded by Ulus Square to the north, the Ankara Opera House (formerly Ankara Exhibition Building) to the east, Selim Sırrı Tarcan Sport Hall and Ankara Central Station to the south and, 19 Mayıs Stadium to the west.

== History ==
During the early years of the Turkish Republic, the place where the park is located was a marshland. After the marshes were drained, the park was established and opened to the public on 19 May 1943, the National Youth Day. There were coffee houses around the 42,000 m^{2} (0.016 mi^{2}) main pool, a swimming pool, a luna park, an open-air theatre and tracks. In 1957, two miniature trains were established within the park area as a part of the amusement attractions.

== The park in the 2000s ==
After restoration and renovation works, there are now a cultural center, youths' center and Ankara Municipality Convention Hall as well as 43 kiosks in the park. During nights light performances are held in the main pool. Also a science museum is under construction.
