= Shevket Pasha cabinet =

Cabinet of the Ottoman Grand Vizier Mahmud Shevket Pasha

- Government of the Ottoman Empire

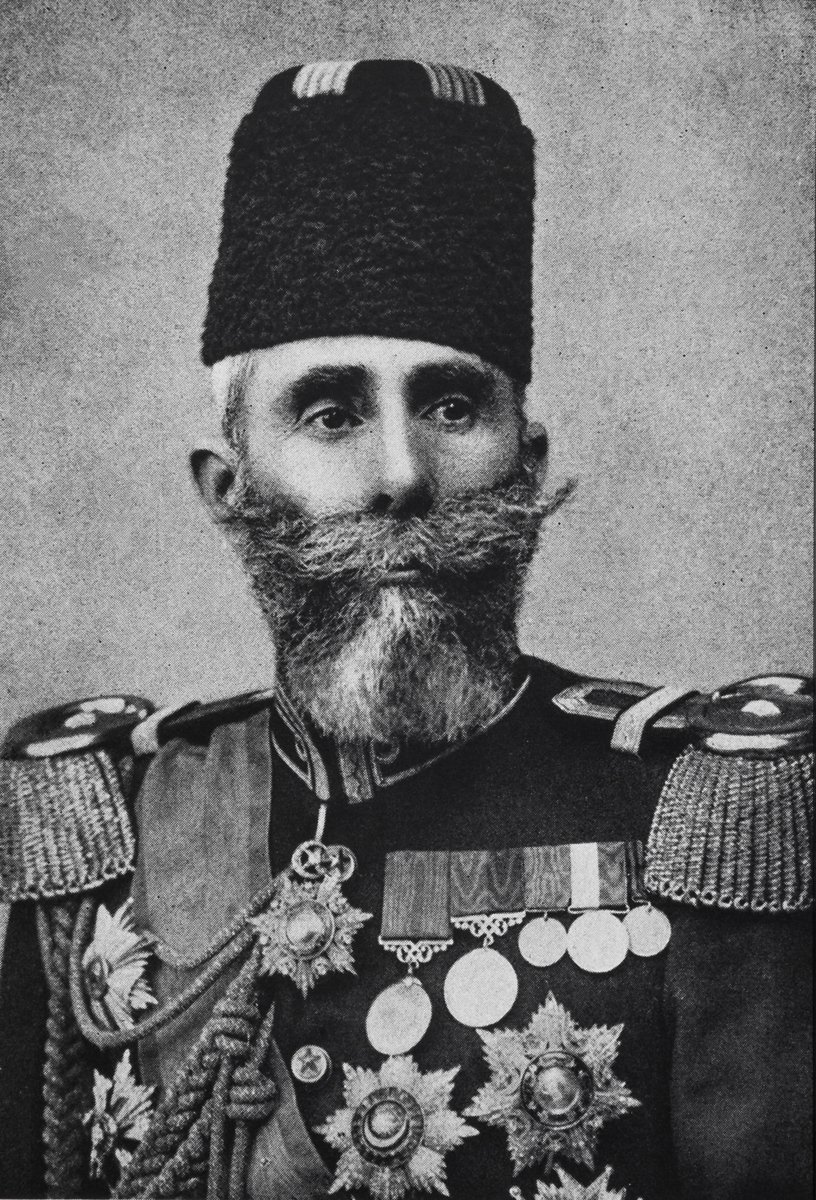
- Mahmud Shevket Pasha
- Date formed: 23 January 1913
- Date dissolved: 12 June 1913

People and organisations
- Head of state: Mehmed V
- Head of government: Mahmud Shevket Pasha
- No. of ministers: 12
- Member parties: Union and Progress Party

History
- Predecessor: Kamil Pasha government
- Successor: Said Halim Pasha government

The Shevket Pasha cabinet was headed by Grand Vizier Mahmud Shevket Pasha. It was formed on 23 January 1913 after the Raid on the Sublime Porte, which occurred due to Kamil Pasha's attempt to sign a peace treaty would have ended the First Balkan War by giving most of Turkey-in-Europe to the Balkan League. Within two weeks of the coup, Shevket Pasha broke the armistice and resumed fighting but failed to recapture land. In the end the government had to abide by the Treaty of London, which gave up the city of Adrianople to Bulgaria, one of the Ottoman Empire's original capitals. Following Shevket Pasha's assassination on June 12, Said Halim Pasha was brought in to form a new government after Shevket Pasha's assassination.

It was a national unity government that had the support of the Committee of Union and Progress, which provided three ministers to the government. The CUP were the drivers the coup and wished for Kamil's War Minister Nazım Pasha to lead the incoming government, but his death during the coup meant the CUP had to settle with Mahmud Shevket Pasha to lead the government.

== List of ministers ==
Cabinet Mahmud Shevket Pasha 23 January 1913 – 12 June 1913
| Portfolio | Minister | Reference |
|---|---|---|
| Grand Vizier War | Mahmud Shevket Pasha | |
| Foreign Affairs | Said Halim Pasha | |
| Interior | Hacı Adil (Arda) | |
| Finance | Menemenlizade Rifat | |
| Chief of the general staff | Ahmed İzzet Pasha (Furgaç) | |
| Justice | Pirizade İbrahim Hayrullah | |
| President of Council of State | Mehmed Said Pasha | |
| Trade and Agriculture | Mehmet Celal | |
| Navy | Çürüksulu Mahmud Pasha | |
| Post and Telegraph | Oskan Mardikyan | |
| Public Works | Nicolae Constantin Batzaria | |
| Education | Ahmet Şükrü (Bayındır) | |
| Evkaf | Mustafa Hayri Efendi | |
