= Khoyskis =

Azerbaijani noble family

Khoyskis or Khan-Khoyskis
Origin
- Region of origin: Azerbaijan

Khoyskis or Khan-Khoyskis is Azerbaijani noble family.

== History ==
In the late 16th and early 17th centuries, Khoy belonged to the head of the Donboli tribe. In the XVII-XVIII centuries, the city remained the hereditary land of the head of the Donboli tribe. The district of Salmas was attached to this district, which from that time constantly belonged to the hereditary head of the Donboli tribe until 1805.

The children of Ismayil khan adopted the surname Khoyski, and the children of his brother Abuturab khan adopted the surname Abrakhanov.

The surname Khoyski or Khan-Khoyski, which was formed from the toponym - the Khanate of Khoy - was finally assigned to the representatives of this clan as a surname, apparently, in the 1870-1880s.

== Famous members ==
- Ismayil khan Khoyski - the last khan of Sheki, son of Jafar Qoli Khan Donboli.
- Kalbali Khan Khoyski - Major General in the Russian Army, father of Iskander khan Khoyski, grandfather of Fatali khan Khoyski.
- Isgandar Khan Khoyski - a decorated Imperial Russian and Azerbaijani military commander, having the rank of lieutenant-general.
- Huseyngulu Khan Khoyski - Major general of the Russian Imperial Army, elder brother of the Prime Minister of the Democratic Republic of Azerbaijan Fatali khan Khoyski.
- Fatali Khan Khoyski - an Azerbaijani attorney, a member of the Second State Duma of the Russian Empire, Minister of Internal Affairs, Minister of Defense and, later the first Prime Minister of the independent Azerbaijan Democratic Republic.
- Rustam Khan Khoyski - an Azerbaijani statesman who served as the Minister of Social Security of Azerbaijan Democratic Republic and was member of Azerbaijani National Council. Rustam Khan was the younger brother of Fatali Khan Khoyski.
- Tamara Khanum Khoyskaya - Fatali khan Khoyski's daughter, Mirza Davud Huseynov's wife and first lady of Soviet Azerbaijan.
- Amiraslan khan Khoyski - Baku and Quba's deputy general-gubernator and general-gubernator of Azerbaijan Democratic Republic's Kazakh Uyezd.
- Cahangir khan Khoyski - Major general of the Russian Imperial Army.
- Gamar Sheyda - a poet and playwright.

== See also ==
- Narimanbeyovs
