= Cemal Azmi =

Ottoman politician and governor (1868–1922)

- Born: 1868; Arapgir, Ottoman Empire
- Died: April 17, 1922 (aged 53/54); Berlin, Weimar Republic
- Cause of death: Assassination by gunshot
- Resting place: Neukölln cemetery
- Known for: Governor of the Trebizond Vilayet and perpetrator of the Armenian genocide
- Parent(s): Osman Nuri Bey and Gülsüm Hanım

Cemal Azmi (1868 – April 17, 1922), also spelled Jemal Azmi, was an Ottoman Turkish politician and governor of the Trebizond (now Trabzon) Vilayet (province) during World War I and the final years of the Ottoman Empire. He was one of the perpetrators of the Armenian genocide and was mainly responsible for the liquidation of Armenians in Trebizond Vilayet. He was known as the "butcher of Trebizond".

== Family ==
Cemal Azmi was born in Arapgir, Ottoman Empire, in 1868. His father, Osman Nuri Bey, was a title agent and his mother's name was Gülsüm. In 1891 he studied at the Mulkiye Mektep.

=== Role in the Armenian genocide ===
Azmi was one of the founders of the Teşkilât-ı Mahsusa (Special Organization). Many members of this organization eventually participated in the Turkish National Movement and played special roles in the Armenian Genocide. Just prior to World War I, Azmi became the governor of Trebizond on July 7, 1914. During the Armenian Genocide in 1915, Azmi continued serving his duties as governor of the Trebizond Vilayet. Azmi favored conducting massacres outside of the city of Trebizond (now Trabzon). He was especially known for his persecution and violence towards Armenian children. Azmi, along with the collaboration of Nail Bey, ordered the drowning of thousands of women and children in the Black Sea.

Oscar S. Heizer, the American consul at Trebizond, reports: "This plan did not suit Nail Bey...Many of the children were loaded into boats and taken out to sea and thrown overboard". The Italian consul of Trebizond in 1915, Giacomo Gorrini, writes: "I saw thousands of innocent women and children placed on boats which were capsized in the Black Sea". The Trabzon trials also reported Armenians having been drowned in the Black Sea.

On April 12, 1919, during the 10th sitting of the Trabzon trials, it was testified by an eyewitness that Cemal Azmi turned a local hospital into a "pleasure dome" where he frequently had "sex orgies" with young Armenian girls. Hasan Maruf, a Turkish lieutenant and eyewitness to the scene said: "After committing the worst outrages the government officials involved had these young girls killed." While in Germany, Azmi disclosed to a local Armenian that he had young girls drowned at sea: "Among the most pretty Armenian girls, 10–13 years old, I selected a number of them and handed them over to my son as a gift; the others I had drowned in the sea." Azmi was also known for collecting girls up to the age of fifteen and boys up to the age of ten from orphanages and giving them to Muslim households.

=== Confiscation of Armenian assets ===
In the aftermath of the Armenian genocide, the Azmi family acquired significant wealth through the confiscation of former Armenian-owned property and assets. Arusiag Kilijian, an 18-year-old orphan, who was a captive of Azmi's family, reported that Azmi's house was filled with "stolen goods, rugs, and so on".

It was also noted during the cross-examination of Nuri Bey during the 9th session of the trials at Trabzon on April 10, 1919, that Agent Mustafa, the commander of the seaport of Trabzon, "had taken a box belonging to Vartivar Muradian" and had received "five hundred pounds gold and jewels" from Cemal Azmi in exchange.

=== 1919–1920 Military courts martial and Trabzon trials ===
During the Turkish Courts-Martial of 1919–1920, Ottoman politician Çürüksulu Mahmud Pasha gave a speech in the Ottoman senate on December 2, 1919, where he openly blamed Cemal Azmi for the massacres in Trebizond and the subsequent drowning of thousands of women and children.

On December 11, 1918, Trebizond deputy governor Hafiz Mehmet testified in the Chamber of Deputies:

Under the pretext of sending off to Samsun, another port city on the Black Sea [about 255 kilometres (158 mi) west of Trabzon], the district's governor loaded the Armenians into barges and had them thrown overboard. I have heard that the governor-general applied this procedure [throughout the province]. Even though I reported this at the Interior Ministry immediately upon my return to Istanbul, I was unable to initiate any action against the latter; I tried for some three years to get such action instituted but in vain

During the 14th session of the Trebizond trials on 26 April 1919, the governor of Giresun Arif Bey, asserted that Azmi gave him orders "to deport the Armenians toward Mosul by way of the Black Sea", which implied drowning them.

On May 22, 1919, as a result of the Trebizond trials, Cemal Azmi was sentenced to death under the charges of "murder and forced relocation".

== Cemal Azmi's assassination ==
As part of Operation Nemesis for his role in the Armenian Genocide, Aram Yerganian and Arshavir Shirakian were later given the task to assassinate both Azmi and Bahattin Şakir who were in Berlin. On April 17, 1922, Shirakian and Yerganian encountered Azmi and Şakir who were walking with their families on Uhlandstraße. Shirakian managed to kill only Azmi and wound Şakir. Yerganian immediately ran after Şakir and killed him with a shot to his head.

In 2003 an elementary school in Trabzon was named in honor of Cemal Azmi.

== See also ==
- Committee of Union and Progress
- Operation Nemesis
- Trabzon during the Armenian Genocide
