= Talaat Pasha cabinet =

Cabinet of the Ottoman Grand Vizier Talaat Pasha

- Government of the Ottoman Empire

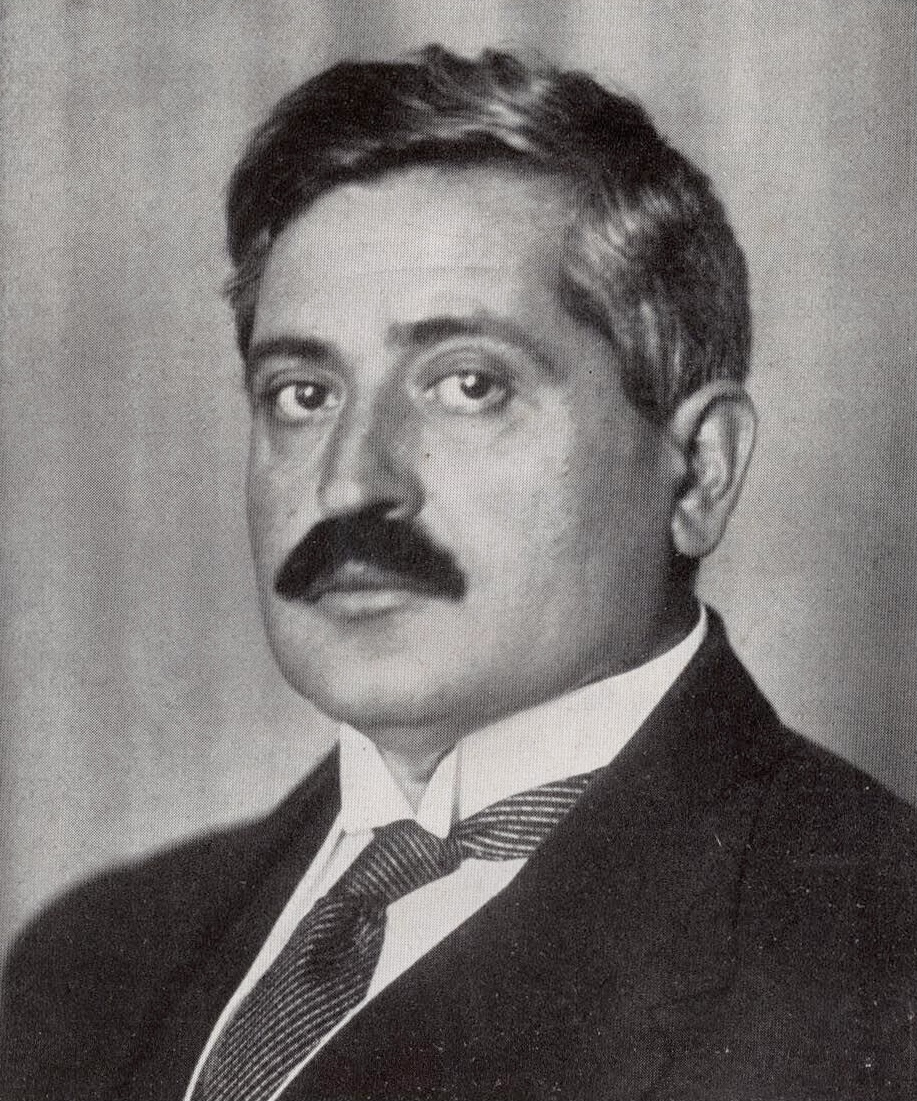
- Talaat Pasha
- Date formed: 4 February 1917
- Date dissolved: 8 October 1918

People and organisations
- Head of state: Mehmed V, Mehmed VI
- Head of government: Talaat Pasha
- No. of ministers: 10
- Member parties: Union and Progress Party

History
- Predecessor: Said Halim Pasha government
- Successor: Ahmet İzzet Pasha government

The Talaat Pasha cabinets were headed by Grand Vizier Talaat Pasha. It was formed on February 4 after Said Halim Pasha's resignation. It was composed of members of the Union and Progress Party. The cabinet was dissolved upon Mehmed V's death, Mehmed VI again appointed Talaat Pasha as his Grand Vizier following his sword girding. Talaat Pasha resigned due to Ottoman defeat in the Great War on 8 October, but stayed in office for a few more days running a caretaker government.

The government was noted for being one of the smallest war time cabinets of WWI.

== List of ministers ==
Cabinet Talaat Pasha 4 February 1917 – 8 October 1918
| Portfolio | Minister | Took office | Left office |
|---|---|---|---|
| Grand Vizier | Mehmed Talaat Pasha | 4 February 1917 | 14 October 1918 |
| Şeyhülislam | Musa Kazım Efendi | 4 February 1917 | 14 October 1918 |
| Minister of War & Chief of the general staff | İsmail Enver Pasha | 4 February 1917 | 14 October 1918 |
| Minister of Foreign Affairs | Ahmed Nesimi (Sayman) | 4 February 1917 | 14 October 1918 |
| Minister of Justice | Halil Menteşe | 4 February 1917 | 12 October 1918 |
| Minister of Justice | Mustafa Şeref Bey** | 12 October 1918 | 14 October 1918 |
| President of Council of State | Halil Bey (Menteşe) | 4 February 1917 | 12 October 1918 |
| President of Council of State | Mustafa Şeref Bey** | 12 October 1918 | 14 October 1918 |
| Minister of Interior | Mehmed Talaat Pasha | 4 February 1917 | 29 July 1918 |
| Minister of Interior | İsmail Canbulat | 29 July 1918 | 1 October 1918 |
| Minister of Interior | Mehmed Talaat Pasha** | 1 October 1918 | 14 October 1918 |
| Minister of Finance | Mehmed Talaat Pasha** | 4 February 1917 | 10 February 1917 |
| Minister of Finance | Mehmed Cavid | 10 February 1917 | 14 October 1918 |
| Minister of Imperial Pious Foundations | Musa Kazım Efendi | 4 February 1917 | 14 October 1918 |
| Minister of Navy | Ahmed Cemal Pasha* | 4 February 1917 | 14 October 1918 |
| Minister of Education | Şükrü Bey | 4 February 1917 | 22 December 1917 |
| Minister of Education | Ali Münif (Yeğenağa)** | 22 December 1917 | 20 July 1918 |
| Minister of Education | Mehmed Nâzım | 20 July 1918 | 14 October 1918 |
| Minister of Trade and Agriculture | Mustafa Şerif (Özkan) | 4 February 1917 | 14 October 1918 |
| Minister of Public Works | Ali Münif (Yeğenağa) | 4 February 1917 | 14 October 1918 |
| Minister of Post, Telegraph, and Telephone | Şükrü Bey** | 4 February 1917 | 16 September 1917 |
| Minister of Post, Telegraph, and Telephone | Hüseyin Haşim (Sanver) | 16 September 1917 | 14 October 1918 |
| Minister of Supply | Kara Kemal | 18 August 1918 | 14 October 1918 |
