= Said Halim Pasha cabinet =

Cabinet of the Ottoman Grand Vizier Said Halim Pasha

- Government of the Ottoman Empire

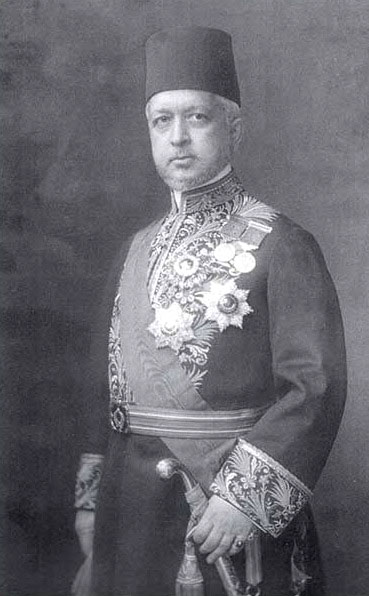
- Said Halim Pasha
- Date formed: 17 June 1913
- Date dissolved: 3 February 1917

People and organisations
- Head of state: Mehmed V
- Head of government: Said Halim Pasha
- Total no. of members: 14
- Member parties: Union and Progress Party

History
- Election: 1914 Ottoman general election
- Predecessor: Shevket Pasha government
- Successor: Talaat Pasha government

The Said Halim Pasha cabinet was headed by Grand Vizier Said Halim Pasha. It was formed on 17 June 1913 after Mahmud Shevket Pasha's assassination. It soon came to be wholly controlled by the Union and Progress Party. With the exception of Mardikyan Bey being the only Christian, everyone in cabinet was Muslim, with Said Halim Pasha and his brother Abbas Pasha Arabs and the rest Turks.

Said Halim's government was under the influence of Talaat Bey, Enver Pasha, and Cemal Pasha. While Said Halim negotiated a secret alliance with the German Empire, Enver and Talaat engineered the Ottoman Empire's entry into the First World War. This caused four ministers to tender their resignations.

On 3 February 1917, Said Halim resigned due to "health concerns" and Talaat Bey was appointed Grand Vizier the next day.

Cabinet Mehmed Said Halim Pasha 17 June 1913 – 3 February 1917
Portfolio	Minister	Took office	Left office
Grand Vizier	Said Halim Pasha	17 June 1913	3 February 1917
Şeyhülislam	Mehmed Esad Efendi	17 June 1913	16 March 1914
Şeyhülislam	Mustafa Hayri Efendi	16 March 1914	3 February 1917
Minister of War	Ahmet İzzet Pasha (Furgaç)	17 June 1913	3 January 1914
Minister of War	İsmail Enver Pasha	3 January 1914	3 February 1917
Minister of Foreign Affairs	Said Halim Pasha	17 June 1913	24 October 1915
Minister of Foreign Affairs	Halil Menteşe	24 October 1915	3 February 1917
Minister of Justice	Pirizade İbrahim Hayrullah*	17 June 1913	3 February 1917
President of Council of State	Halil Menteşe	17 June 1913	28 May 1914
President of Council of State	Pirizade İbrahim Hayrullah**	28 May 1914	3 February 1917
Minister of Interior	Mehmed Talaat	17 June 1913	3 February 1917
Minister of Finance	Menemenlizade Rifat*	17 June 1913	10 March 1914
Minister of Finance	Mehmed Cavid	10 March 1914	5 November 1914
Minister of Finance	Mehmed Talaat**	5 November 1914	3 February 1917
Minister of Imperial Pious Foundations	Mustafa Hayri Efendi*	17 June 1913	8 May 1916
Minister of Imperial Pious Foundations	Pirizade İbrahim Hayrullah**	8 May 1916	3 February 1917
Minister of Navy	Çürüksulu Mahmud Pasha**	17 June 1913	9 March 1914
Minister of Navy	Ahmed Cemal Pasha	10 March 1914	3 February 1917
Minister of Education	Ahmet Şükrü (Bayındır)	12 June 1913	3 February 1917
Minister of Trade and Agriculture	Suleyman al-Boustani	17 June 1913	5 November 1914
Minister of Trade and Agriculture	Ahmet Nesimi (Sayman)	5 November 1914	3 February 1917
Minister of Public Works	Osman Nizami Pasha	17 June 1913	17 December 1913
Minister of Public Works	Ahmed Cemal Pasha**	17 December 1913	25 February 1914
Minister of Public Works	Ahmed Cemal Pasha	25 February 1914	10 March 1914
Minister of Public Works	Çürüksulu Mahmud Pasha	10 March 1914	5 November 1914
Minister of Public Works	Ahmet Nesimi (Sayman)**	5 November 1914	7 November 1914
Minister of Public Works	Abbas Halim Pasha	7 November 1914	3 February 1917
Minister of Post, Telegraph, and Telephone	Oskan Mardikyan*	17 June 1913	5 November 1914
Minister of Post, Telegraph, and Telephone	Ahmet Şükrü (Bayındır)**	5 November 1914	3 February 1917
