= İzzet Pasha cabinet =

Cabinet of the Ottoman Grand Vizier Ahmed Izzet Pasha

Ahmet İzzet Pasha cabinet
- Government of the Ottoman Empire

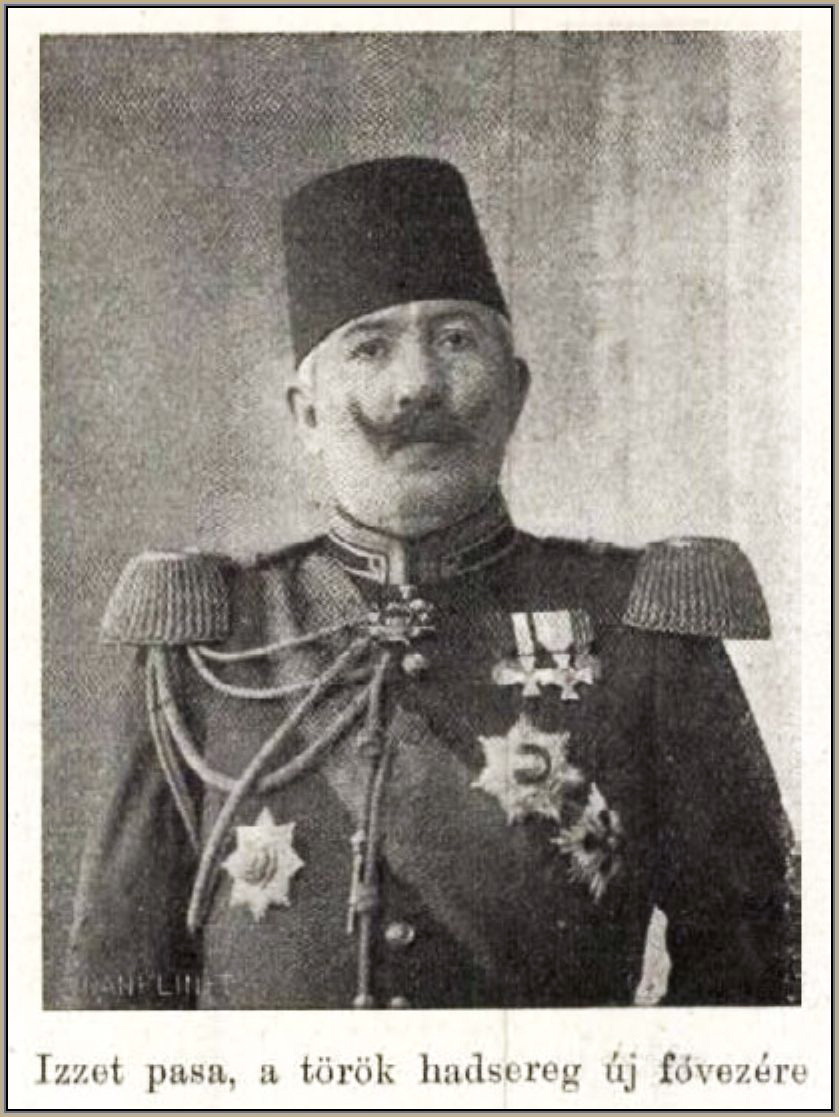
- Ahmet İzzet Pasha
- Date formed: 14 October 1918
- Date dissolved: 11 November 1918

People and organisations
- Sultan: Mehmed VI
- Grand Vizier: Ahmed İzzet Pasha
- Member parties: Union and Progress Party
- Status in legislature: Majority

History
- Election: 1914 general election
- Predecessor: Talaat Pasha government
- Successor: Ahmet Tevfik Pasha government

The İzzet Pasha cabinet was headed by Grand Vizier Ahmet İzzet Pasha. It was formed on October 14, 1918 after Talaat Pasha's resignation. It was mostly composed of members of the anti-war faction of the Union and Progress Party. The most important accomplishment of the government was when Naval Minister Rauf Orbay signed the Armistice of Mudros on October 30, ending World War I for the Ottoman Empire. The government did not last long, and İzzet Pasha resigned just before the occupation of Istanbul.

Cabinet İzzet Pasha 14 October 1918 – 11 November 1918
Portfolio	Minister	Took office	Left office
Grand Vizier	Ahmed İzzet Pasha (Furgaç)	14 October 1918	11 November 1918
Şeyhülislam	Ömer Hulusi Efendi	14 October 1918	11 November 1918
Minister of War & Chief of the general staff	Ahmed İzzet Pasha (Furgaç)	14 October 1918	11 November 1918
Minister of Foreign Affairs	Menemenlizade Mehmed Nabi**	14 October 1918	28 October 1918
Minister of Foreign Affairs	Menemenlizade Mehmed Nabi	28 October 1918	11 November 1918
Minister of Justice	Mustafa Hayri Efendi	14 October 1918	11 November 1918
President of Council of State	Reşid Akıf Pasha	14 October 1918	11 November 1918
Minister of Interior	Ali Fethi (Okyar)	14 October 1918	11 November 1918
Minister of Finance	Mehmed Cavid*	14 October 1918	11 November 1918
Minister of Imperial Pious Foundations	Abdurrahman Şeref	14 October 1918	11 November 1918
Minister of Navy	Hüseyin Rauf (Orbay)	14 October 1918	11 November 1918
Minister of Education	Gelenbevizade Mehmet Said	14 October 1918	11 November 1918
Minister of Trade and Agriculture	Ziya Pasha (Kutnak)**	14 October 1918	26 October 1918
Minister of Trade and Agriculture	Celal Muhtar**	26 October 1918	11 November 1918
Minister of Public Works	Ziya Pasha (Kutnak)	14 October 1918	11 November 1918
Minister of Post, Telegraph, and Telephone	Abdurrahman Şeref	14 October 1918	11 November 1918
Minister of Supply	Celal Muhtar	14 October 1918	11 November 1918
