= Hafız Mehmet =

Turkish politician and the Minister of Justice for the Republic of Turkey

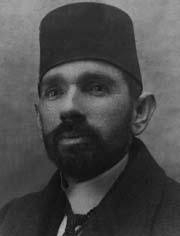
Hafız Mehmet Bey

Hafız Mehmet (1874 – 13 July 1926) was a Turkish politician and the acting Minister of Justice for the Republic of Turkey. While serving as a deputy in Trabzon, he was a witness to the Armenian genocide. His testimony of the event is considered by genocide scholar Vahakn Dadrian as one of the "rarest corroborations of the fact of the complicity of governmental officials in the organization of the mass murder of Armenians". He was sentenced to death after the İzmir trials of 1926, charged with attempting to assassinate Mustafa Kemal Atatürk.

== Early life ==
Hafız Mehmet was born in the Ottoman Empire in the village of Sürmene located near Trabzon in 1874. He was the son of Hacı Yakubzâde Ahmed Ağa. He received his early education in local schools near Trabzon. Mehmet moved to Istanbul to study law, where he ultimately attained a degree in law. He served as a lawyer throughout the Ottoman Empire.

In the 1912 and 1914 Young Turk elections, Hafız Mehmet was elected as a deputy who represented Trabzon. As a practicing lawyer, Mehmet was nicknamed "hukukcu" or lawyer.

== Armenian Genocide witness ==
Hafız Mehmet served as a deputy in Trabzon, where an estimated 50,000 Armenians were killed during the Armenian genocide. Since Trabzon was a coastal city of the Black Sea, the method employed to kill was mainly mass drowning. Hafız Mehmet witnessed such drownings of Armenians off the coast of Ordu, near Trabzon, and provided testimony of his eyewitness accounts during a 21 December 1918 parliamentary session of the Chamber of Deputies:

God will punish us for what we did [Allah bize belasını verecektir] ...the matter is too obvious to be denied. I personally witnessed this Armenian occurrence in the port city of Ordu [about 155 km west of Trabzon]. Under the pretext of sending off to Samsun, another port city on the Black Sea [about 255 km west of Trabzon], the district's governor loaded the Armenians into barges and had them thrown overboard. I have heard that the governor-general applied this procedure [throughout the province]. Even though I reported this at the Interior Ministry immediately upon my return to Istanbul ...I was unable to initiate any action against the latter; I tried for some three years to get such action instituted but in vain. (Note: Original Turkish: Ordu kazasında bir kaymakam vardı. Ermenileri kayığa doldurarak Samsun’a göndermek bahanesi ile denize döktürdü. Vali Cemal Azmi’nin de aynı muameleyi yaptığını işittim. Oraya kadar gidemedim. Ordu kazasından dönmeye mecbur oldum. Buraya gelir gelmez meşhudatımı Dâhiliye Nazırına söyledim. O vakit müfettiş gönderdiler ve kaymakamı azl ettiler. Tahtı muhakemeye aldılar.)

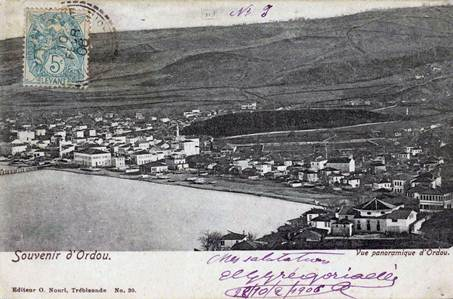
The city of Ordu during the Ottoman era

Hafız Mehmet stated that he and other deputies knew beforehand that the Young Turk government had an underlying aim to exterminate the Armenian population. He also said that those tasked to carry out the responsibility were members of the Special Organization, a special task force under the auspices of the imperial Ottoman government, but that these individuals received orders directly from Cemal Azmi, the governor of the Trabzon province. Mehmet testified that he attempted to stop the massacres by trying to speak with Interior Minister Talaat Pasha directly but that Talat never responded to his inquiries and never questioned the actions of the politicians in Trabzon.

Hafız Mehmet's testimony is considered by genocide scholar Vahakn Dadrian as a representation of the "rarest corroborations of the fact of the complicity of governmental officials in the organization of the mass murder of the Armenians." Others have provided similar testimonies including Oscar S. Heizer, the American consul at Trabzon, who reported that "many of the children were loaded into boats and taken out to sea and thrown overboard." The Italian consul of Trabzon in 1915, Giacomo Gorrini also wrote: "I saw thousands of innocent women and children placed on boats which were capsized in the Black Sea".

== Later life and death ==
Hafız Mehmet was sentenced to death after the İzmir trials of 1926. The trials condemned thirty-six individuals for attempting to assassinate Mustafa Kemal Atatürk.

== See also ==
- Trabzon during the Armenian Genocide
- Witnesses and testimonies of the Armenian genocide
