= Isgandar Khan Khoyski =

Lieutenant general

- Azerbaijani: İsgəndər xan Xoyski
- Born: Isgandar Khan Kalbali Khan oglu Isgandarov; September 1819; Nukha (Shaki), Nukha uezd, Elizavetpol Governorate, Russian Empire
- Died: July 28, 1894 (aged 74); Yelisavetpol (Ganja), Elizavetpol uezd, Elizavetpol Governorate, Russian Empire
- Burial place: Sabiskar Cemetery
- Relatives: Khoyskis
- Military career
- Allegiance: Russian Empire (from 1841 to 1889)
- Branch: Cavalry
- Service years: 1841 — 1899
- Rank: Lieutenant general of The Imperial Russian Army
- Unit: Cavalry
- Conflicts: Caucasus War; Hungarian Revolution of 1848
- Awards: 4th Class Order of Saint Vladimir 2nd Class Ode of Saint Stanislaus 2nd Class Order of Saint Anne 3rd Class Order of Saint Anne

Isgandar Khan Khoyski (Azerbaijani: İsgəndər xan Xoyski; September 1819, Nukha (Shaki), Nukha uezd, Elisavetpol Governorate, Russian Empire – 28 July [O.S. 16 July] 1894, Yelizavetpol, Imperial Russia) was a decorated Imperial Russian and Azerbaijani military commander, having the rank of lieutenant-general.

== Background ==
Although official documents refer to his birthplace and birthdate as 25 May 1820, Yelisavetpol (Ganja), he was probably born in September 1819 in Nukha to noble Khoyski family. His father was Kalbali Khan Khoyski (also known as Kichik Khan) was a major-general in Imperial Russian Army. His mother Sarabayim was his father's first cousin and a daughter of Jafar Qoli Khan Donboli. He also had a sister.

== Education and career ==
He was educated at home and entered serving as naib in the Transcaucasian Equestrian Muslim regiment (1 December [O.S. 19 November] 1841). Next year, for distinction in service, he was promoted to ensign. He took part in the Caucasian War in 1846 and next year he was sent to serve as a cornet in the Life Guards. He was promoted to lieutenant in 1850, then to staff rittmeister (1852), to rittmeister (1854) and captain in 1859. Khoyski was promoted to colonel in 1860 with leaving with the Caucasian army. After being promoted to the rank of major general in 1883, he was promoted to lieutenant general in 1889 and sent to retirement.

== Death ==
He died on 28 July [O.S. 16 July] 1894 in Elisabethpol. While he was still alive, he built a mausoleum for his family in the Sabiskar cemetery in Elisabethpol. His children Jahangir Khan and Tububeyim are buried next to him.

== Family ==
He was married two times:

1. Saadat begüm (1819 - 1892) — daughter of Ismail Khan Khoyski (his uncle)
  1. Jahangir Khan Khoyski (1849-1894)
  2. Saltanat begüm (? - 6 January 1869)
2. Shahrabanu begüm — daughter of Nukha cleric Haji Molla Zeynal
  1. Huseyngulu Khan Khoyski
  2. Tubu begüm Khoyskaya (1871-?)
  3. Fatali Khan Khoyski
  4. Abbasqoli Khan Khoyski (1878-?)
  5. Rustam Khan Khoyski

== Awards ==
- Order of Saint Anna 3rd class (1849)
- Order of Saint Stanislaus 2nd class (1859)
- Order of Saint Anna 2nd class (1871)
- Order of Saint Vladimir 4th class (1871)
- Insignia of Immaculate Service XL (1887)
