= Abbas Hilmi =

Abbas Hilmi may refer to:

- Abbas I of Egypt (1813 – 1854), founder of the reigning dynasty of Egypt and Sudan at the time
- Abbas II of Egypt (1874 – 1944), last Khedive of Egypt and Sudan
- Prince Abbas Hilmi (born 1941), Egyptian prince and financial manager
