= Narimanbeyovs =

Azerbaijani Bey family

Narimanbeyov or Narimanbeyli
Origin
- Region of origin: Shusha, Azerbaijan

Narimanbeyovs is Azerbaijani Bey family from Karabakh, Shusha.

== History ==
The Narimanbeyovs are an old noble Karabakh family. The great-great-grandfather of the Narimanbeyovs was Nariman bey Karabakhi, he was an aristocrat and a very educated person in the city of Shusha. Neriman bey had served to Ibrahim Khalil Khan's son Ahmad Khan. He had sons - Allahveran bey and Nariman bey. The son of Nariman bey, Amir bey Narimanbeyov, during the ADR period was the governor-general of the city of Baku. His nephew, Narimanbeyov Nariman bey, a lawyer, a prominent public and political figure, a member of the Transcaucasian Seim, the National Council of Azerbaijan and the Azerbaijani parliament, was one of the signatories of the act of independence of Azerbaijan on May 28, 1918, was repressed in 1937. The grandchildren of Amir bey Narimanbeyov are the famous Azerbaijani artists Vidadi Farman oglu and Togrul Farman oglu Narimanbeyov.

The ancestors of this clan, according to a well-known genealogy, were members of the Javanshir tribe.

== Famous members ==
- Amir bey Narimanbeyov - general-gubernator of Baku during Azerbaijan Democratic Republic
- Hashim bey Narimanbeyov - Head of the "Russian-Azerbaijani" girls' school in Erivan, a graduate of the Erivan Teachers' Seminary
- Nariman bey Narimanbeyov - lawyer and statesman who served as State Controller in the fourth cabinet of Azerbaijan Democratic Republic, and was member of Parliament of Azerbaijan.
- Farman bey Nerimanbeyov - one of the first Azerbaijanis to study in France and an engineer.
- Togrul Narimanbekov - one of the prominent modern Azerbaijani artists.
- Vidadi Narimanbekov - a painter, Honored Art Worker and People's Artist of the Azerbaijan SSR.
- Arif Nerimanbeyov - cinematographer, director, screenwriter, Honored Art Worker of the Azerbaijan SSR (1964).
- Elmira Hüseynova - sculptor and portrait painter, who has exhibits in various locations throughout the world and was honored as an Honored Artist of Azerbaijan.
- Asmar Narimanbekov - Togrul Narimanbekov's daughter and Honored Artist of Azerbaijan.

== See also ==
- Khoyskis
