= Giacomo Gorrini =

Italian diplomat and historian

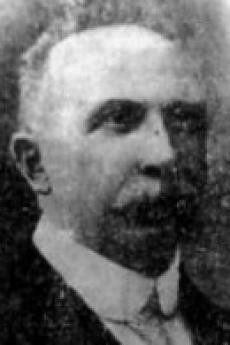
Giacomo Gorrini

Giacomo Gorrini (1859 in Molino dei Torti – 31 October 1950, in Rome) was an Italian diplomat and historian.

== Biography ==
In 1886, he became the first director of the Italian Foreign Minister Archives. In the years 1911-1915 he served as Italian Consul in the provinces of Trabzon, Erzurum, Van, Bitlis, and Sivas. He was eyewitness to the massacres perpetrated by the Young Turks. He had to leave his office in August 1915, when Italy declared war on Turkey. His interview by, il Messaggero, called for, "la più risoluta riprovazione e la vendetta dell'intera Cristianità"(forceful condemnation and vengeance by the whole of Christendom).

During World War I he openly denounced the Armenian genocide through press articles and interviews and he didn't hesitate to describe the horror the Turkish rulers perpetrated against the Armenians. He said if everyone had seen what he had, the condemnation of those acts would have been universal especially on the side of the Christian powers. He was in touch with American Ambassador Morgenthau and the Vatican's Angelo Dolci, and this way he managed to save 50,000 Armenians from deportation and mass murder. Gorrini, who witnessed the drowning of thousands of Armenians, said "I saw thousands of innocent women and children placed on boats which were capsized in the Black Sea". Others have provided similar testimonies including Oscar S. Heizer, the American consul at Trabzon, who reported that "many of the children were loaded into boats and taken out to sea and thrown overboard." Hafiz Mehmet, a deputy from Trabzon, also testified in a 21 December 1918 session of the Turkish Parliament that "Under the pretext of sending off to Samsun, another port city on the Black Sea [about 255 km west of Trabzon], the district's governor loaded the Armenians into barges and had them thrown overboard." Gorrini believed that the orders came from the Central Government, and reported:

The local authorities, and indeed the Moslem population in general, tried to resist, to mitigate it, to make omissions, to hush it up. But the orders of the Central Government were categorically confirmed, and all were compelled to resign themselves and obey. It was a real extermination and slaughter of the innocents, an unheard-of thing, a black page stained with the flagrant violation of the most sacred rights of humanity ...There were about 14,000 Armenians at Trebizond — Gregorians, Catholics, and Protestants. They had never caused disorders or given occasion for collective measures of police. When I left Trebizond, not a hundred of them remained.

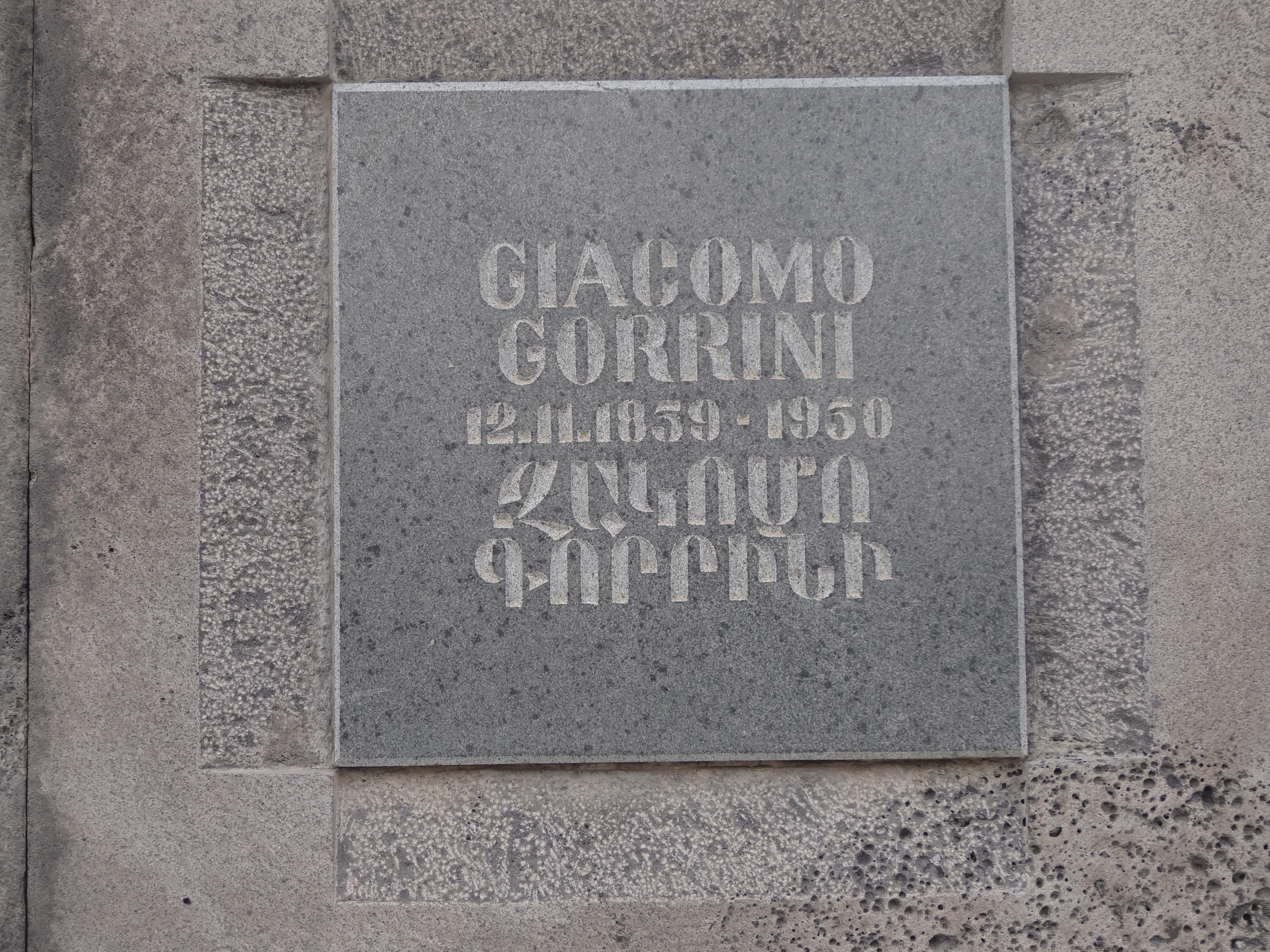
Plaque at Tsitsernakaberd for Giacomo Gorrini (Yerevan, Armenia)

From 1918 to 1920 he was the only Western Ambassador to the First Republic of Armenia. He then tried to obtain the intervention of two Italian warships in favor of the Armenians, but the newly appointed Italian Foreign Minister prevented him from doing so.

In 1920 Gorrini took a stance in favor of the Italian support to the independence of Armenia in a Memorandum attached to the Treaty of Sèvres. There he wrote: "If we don't solve the problem of Armenia, even partially, peace will be periodically disturbed throughout the world". In the following 20 years he helped many Armenians to flee Turkey heading to Italy. He also personally rescued an Armenian girl who would stay with him till his death. In 1940 Giacomo Gorrini published a book in which he stated that the Armenians should regain the land they had lost as soon as possible. This would include Kars, Van, Ardahan and others.

== Works ==
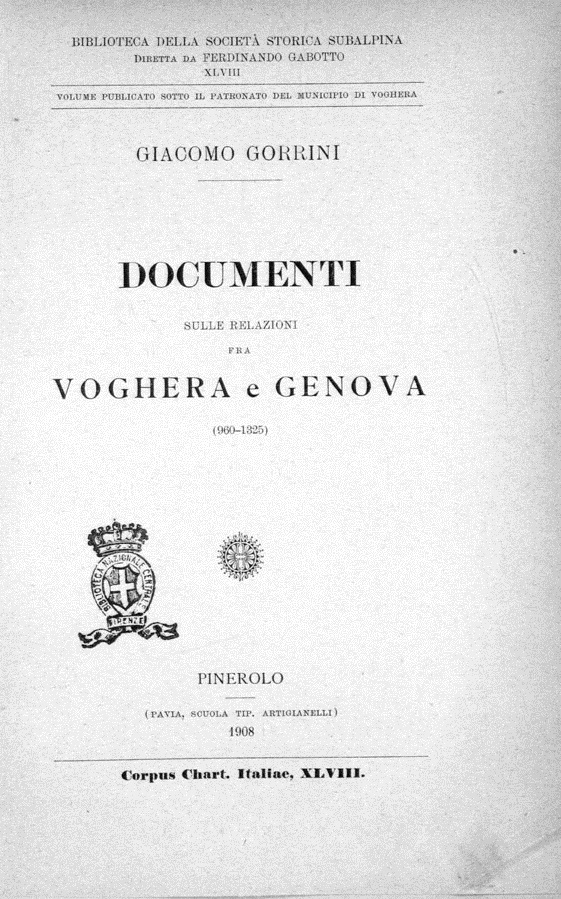
Documenti sulle relazioni fra Voghera e Genova, 1908

- Il comune astigiano e la sua storiografia, Saggio storico-critico, Firenze 1884.
- La politica di Lucca dal 1313 al 1345 e le sue relazioni con Giovanni XXII, Miscellanea Lucchese di Studi Storici e Letterari, Lucca, 1931.
- Documenti sulle relazioni fra Voghera e Genova (960-1325), Pinerolo 1908.
- La popolazione dello Stato Ligure sotto l'aspetto statistico e sociale, in AA.VV., Atti del Congresso internazionale di studi sulla popolazione, Roma, 1931, vol. I, Roma, 1933.
- L'istruzione elementare in Genova e Liguria durante il Medioevo, in «Giornale Storico e Letterario della Liguria», 1931.
- Lettere inedite degli ambasciatori fiorentini alla Corte dei Papi in Avignone, (anno 1340), 1884, Archivio storico italiano, anno XIV, serie IV n. 41, n. 143, 5.
- Una lettera inedita di Giuseppe Mazzini all'intima amica di sua madre Isabella Cambiaso Zerbini (Londra, 9 dicembre 1852), 1931, Archivio Storico, anno LXXXIX, serie VII, n. 340, XVI, 2.
- Raccolta delle circolare e istruzioni ministeriali riservate, 1863-1904, 1904 Roma, Tipografia del ministero degli affari esteri.
- Documenti sulle relazioni fra Voghera e Genova (in Italian). Pinerolo: Società storica subalpina. 1908.
- Orrendi episodi di ferocia musulmana contro gli armeni, Il Messaggero, 25 agosto 1915.
- Tunisi e Biserta. Memorie storiche, Milano, 1940.
- Testimonianze, 1940.

== See also ==
- Witnesses and testimonies of the Armenian genocide
