= Aram Yerganian =

Armenian assassin (1900–1934)

- Born: 20 May 1900; Erzurum, Erzurum Vilayet, Ottoman Empire
- Died: 2 August 1934 (aged 34); Córdoba, Argentina
- Resting place: Cordoba (Armenian Revolutionary Federation headquarters)
- Known for: Assassinating Fatali Khan Khoyski, Cemal Azmi and Bahattin Sakir
- Political party: Armenian Revolutionary Federation

Aram Yerganian (Armenian: Արամ Երկանեան; 20 May 1900 – 2 August 1934) was an Armenian revolutionary who was noted for his assassination of Behaeddin Sakir and Fatali Khan Khoyski as an act of vengeance for their roles in the Armenian genocide and the massacre of Armenians in Baku respectively. He is considered an Armenian national hero.

== Early life ==
Aram Yerganian was born in Erzurum on 20 May 1900. He was the third child of Sarkis Yerganian and Mariam Soghoyan-Yerganian. He attended a local school in Erzurum.

Yerganian, who witnessed the Armenian genocide, sought refuge in the Caucasus. In 1917 he enlisted for the Armenian volunteer detachments and fought for General Dro in the Battle of Bash Abaran. After the victory over the Ottoman forces and the establishment of the Democratic Republic of Armenia in 1918, Yerganian enlisted in Operation Nemesis, the covert operation led by a special body of the Armenian Revolutionary Federation aimed at assassinating all key organizers of massacres against Armenians both in the Ottoman Empire and in Azerbaijan.

== Operation Nemesis ==
After Armenia lost its independence to the Bolsheviks, Yerganian went to Tbilisi where he and Misak Grigorian were assigned to assassinate former Prime Minister of the Democratic Republic of Azerbaijan Fatali Khan Khoyski and leader of the Musavat party Khan Mahmadov. On 19 June 1920, they met at Tbilisi's Yerevan Square as they awaited a signal from their accomplices. When Khoiski and Mahmadov were 100 to 150 meters away, they immediately opened fire on them. Khoiski was killed instantly, but Mahmadov, who was only wounded, escaped.

After his task in Tbilisi was finished, Yerganian went to Istanbul where he attempted to recruit more avengers for the operation.

Yerganian and Arshavir Shirakian were later given the task to assassinate both Cemal Azmi and Behaeddin Sakir who were in Berlin. On 17 April 1922, Shirakian and Yerganian encountered Azmi and Sakir who were walking with their families on Uhlandstrasse. Shirakian managed to kill only Azmi and wound Sakir. Yerganian immediately ran after Sakir and killed him with a shot to his head.

== Later life ==
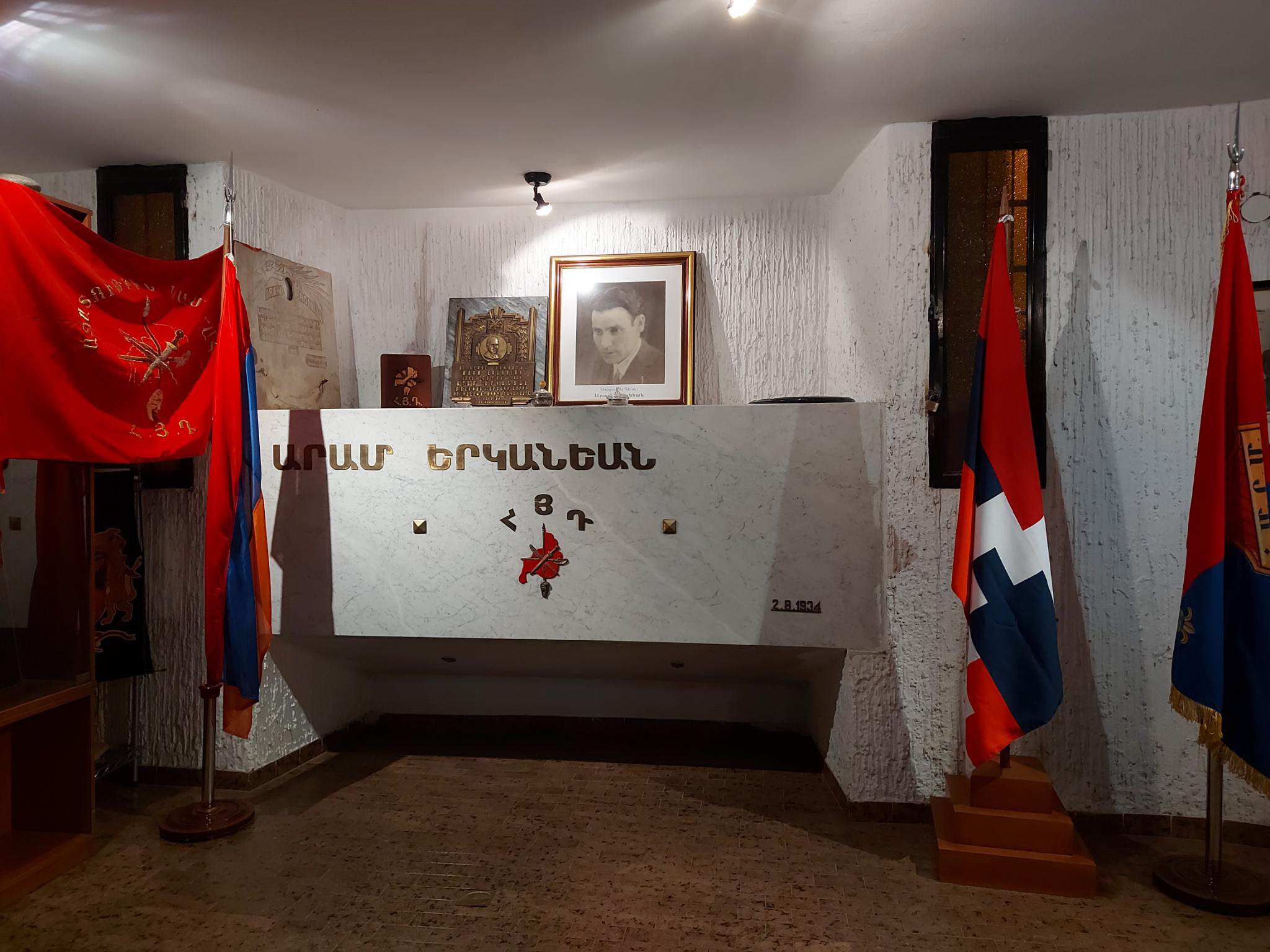
Grave of Aram Yerganian in the ARF Antranig Club in the city of Cordoba, Argentina.

After his action in Germany, Yerganian went to Austria and then to Bucharest, where he lived until he moved to Buenos Aires in 1927. In Buenos Aires Yerganian became an editor for the local "Armenia" newspaper.

In 1931 he married Zabel Paragyan and had one daughter.

After contracting tuberculosis, Yerganian moved to the province of Cordoba where he died on 2 August 1934, at the age of 34. He is buried at the ARF Antranig Club in the city of Cordoba.
