= Evkaf Administration of Cyprus =

Organization based in Cyprus

- Formation: 1571
- Headquarters: Nicosia
- Official language: Turkish
- Website: http://www.evkaf.org/

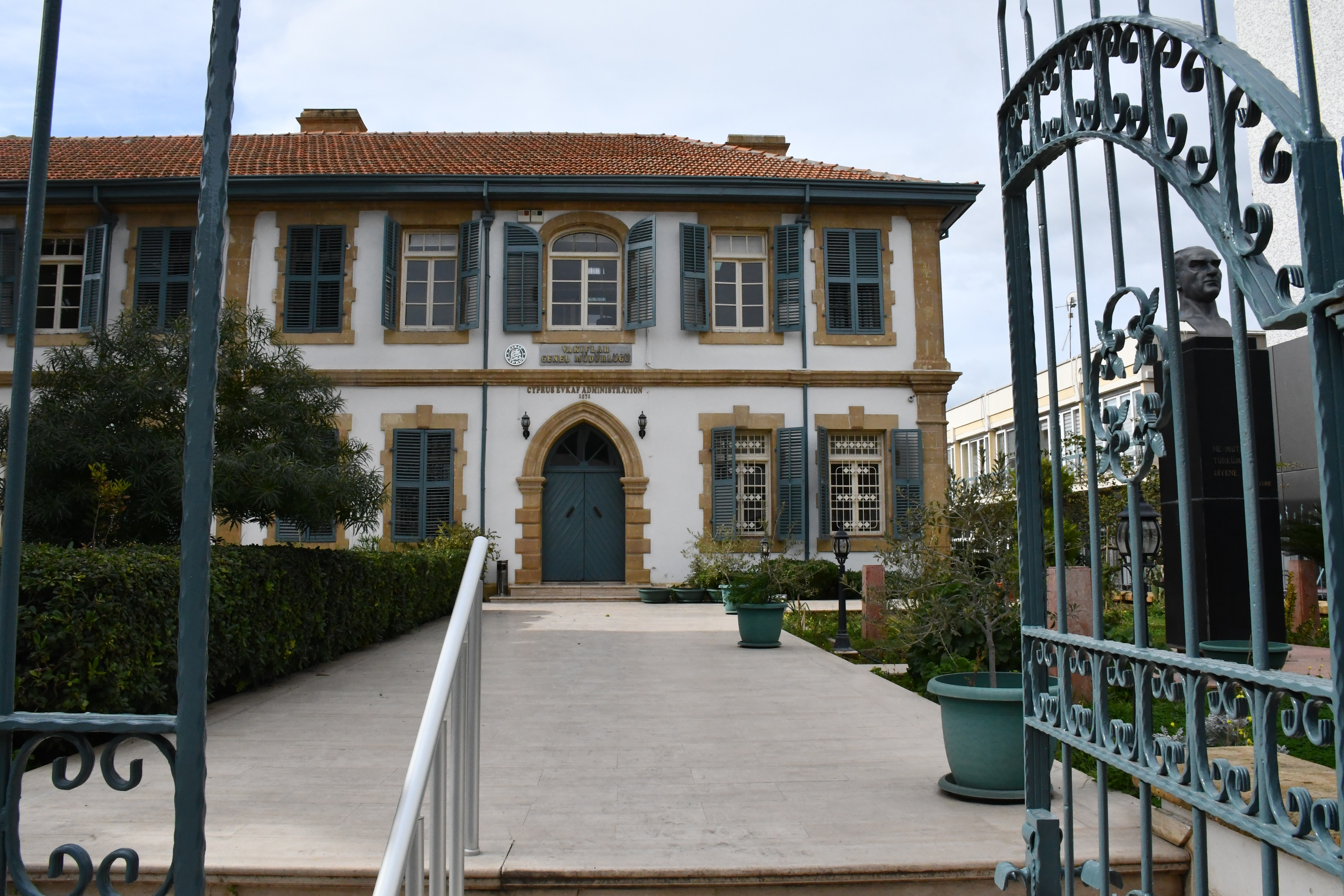
The front view of headquarters of Evkaf Administration of Cyprus

Evkaf Administration of Cyprus is the organization that oversees the functionality of vakıfs (foundations) and the registered properties in Cyprus.

Officially, foundation of Evkaf is dated to 1571, short after the Ottoman conquest of Cyprus. The exact founding point is accepted as the founding of Sultan Selim Foundation in 15 September 1570, during the first Friday's prayer in St. Sophia Cathedral, newly converted into a mosque. During most of the Ottoman rule, many vakıfs were administered by locals, while the local Kadi oversaw and registered those. During the reformation of the Ottoman Empire during early 19. century, all vakıfs in the island was placed under a centralized administration by the Ministry of Evkaf in 1826, El-Hac Yusuf Efendi was appointed as its director.

The Cyprus Convention of 1878 has allowed United Kingdom to exert some control over Evkaf, even though the structures of vakıfs and other religious departments of the Ottomans. This arrangement led to appointment of an Ottoman and a British representative in charge; with board of directors consisting of Ottoman and British representatives, mufti, Kadı of Cyprus and the Evkaf accountant. Ottoman government did not send any representatives until 1881, when the Evkaf accountant Ahmet Hulusi Efendi was appointed. This led to a dispute between Sublime Porte and the British administration over appointment of the Evkaf accountant after replacement of Ottoman representative. This arrangement was abolished with the annexation of Cyprus by the British in 1914; directorship of Evkaf was given to Musa İrfan Bey, a pro-British director engaged in corruption with Charles Sherwood.

During the British colonial administration, the government sought to weaken and take control of Evkaf and thus, securing loyalty of Turkish Cypriots. Even though seizure of Evkaf properties as Seager suggested didn't take place in a legislative way, such changes were made to weaken position of Evkaf. A law passed in 1926 revoked the authority of tax collection by vakıfs, while a portion of budget was given to Evkaf. The British-controlled Evkaf did not contest British administrators seizing Evkaf properties, including parts of Varosha. British leadership considered Evkaf as a tool to create a loyal class of Turkish Cypriots, such as Musa İrfan Bey and Sir Mehmet Münir. As such; status of Evkaf was highly debated among Turkish Cypriots.

Over time, with the influence of Atatürk's reforms; Turkish Cypriots began to oppose colonial administration over leanings of Evkaf and sought its return to Turkish Cypriot leadership. Pro-British long-time General Director of Evkaf, Sir Mehmet Münir was replaced in 1948. Continued opposition to the British, coupled with support of Turkish Prime Minister, Adnan Menderes, British administration finally relinquished its control over Evkaf in 1956.

After the Turkish invasion of Cyprus in 1974, many properties that belonged to Evkaf were rendered inaccessible. Even though properties within North Cyprus were maintained and overseen, those that remained in the areas under effective control of the Republic of Cyprus have not received any oversight from Evkaf.

== See also ==
- Ministry of Evkaf – Imperial ministry of the Ottoman Empire

== Sources ==
1. "Kıbrıs Vakıfları'nın Kısa Tarihi". Kıbrıs Vakıflar İdaresi. Archived from the original on 10 March 2018.
2. Yıldız, Netice (2009). Michael, Michalis M.; Kappler, Matthias; Gavriel, Eftihios (eds.). Ottoman Cyprus: A Collection of Studies on History and Culture. Wiesbaden: Harrassowitz Verlag. pp. 117-159. ISBN 978-3-447-05899-5.
3. Nevzat, Altay; Hatay, Mete (2009). "Politics, Society and the Decline of Islam in Cyprus: From the Ottoman Era to the Twenty-First Century". Middle Eastern Studies. Vol. 45, no. 6. pp. 911–933. doi:10.1080/00263200903268686. Archived from the original on 29 October 2019.
4. Kara, Adem; Çelik, Cemil (2011). "Kıbrıs'ta Vakıf Yönetimi ve Denetimi Sorunu". History Studies. Vol. 3, no. 3. pp. 161–175.
