= Arshavir Shirakian =

Armenian Killer (d. 1973)

Coordinates: 40.90872°N 74.033301°W

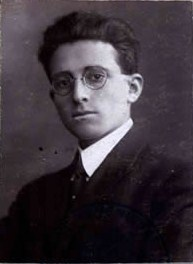
- Shiragian's passport photo in 1919
- Born: 1900; Constantinople, Ottoman Empire
- Died: April 12, 1973 (aged 72–73); Englewood, New Jersey, US
- Resting place: Hackensack Cemetery
- Known for: Assassinating Cemal Azmi, Said Halim Pasha, Behaeddin Shakir, and Vahe Ihsan
- Political party: Armenian Revolutionary Federation

Arshavir Shirakian (also Shiragian, Armenian: Արշաւիր Շիրակեան; January 1, 1902 or 1900 – April 12, 1973) was an Armenian writer and assassin who was noted for his assassination of Said Halim Pasha and Cemal Azmi as an act of vengeance for their roles in the Armenian genocide. His memoirs, It was the Will for the Martyrs (Կտակն էր Նահատակներուն), is a description of his life during the Armenian genocide and the Operation Nemesis.

== Life ==
Arshavir Shirakian was born in Constantinople, Ottoman Empire, in 1900. Shirakian grew up around many members of the Armenian Revolutionary Federation. During the Armenian Genocide, Shirakian was entrusted the job of smuggling weapons and delivering secret messages amongst party members. Shirakian would describe in his memoirs that during those days, there were many hate rallies against Armenians and that many Armenian establishments were vandalized such as the Tokatlian Hotel.

== Operation Nemesis ==
Arshavir Shirakian's first target was assassinating Armenian Vahe Ihsan (Yesayan). According to his memoirs, Vahe Ihsan was "a traitor who was despised by his countrymen, his relatives, and eventually by his own children" and "helped to draw up the list of prominent Armenians who were arrested and deported in 1915." Shirakian assassinated Ihsan on March 27, 1920, in Constantinople.

Shirakian was given the task to assassinate Said Halim Pasha while he was in exile in Rome, Italy. Shirakian took up residence in a house Via Cola di Rienzo 28 in Rome. On December 5, 1921, Shirakian assassinated Said Halim Pasha while he was in a taxi on the way home on Via Eustachio.

Shirakian, along with Aram Yerganian, was later given the task to assassinate both Cemal Azmi and Behaeddin Shakir, who were in Berlin. On April 17, 1922, Shirakian and Yerganian encountered Azmi and Shakir walking with their families at the Uhlandstraße. Shirakian managed to kill only Azmi and wound Shakir. Yerganian later ran after Shakir and managed to kill him with a shot to his head.

== Later life ==
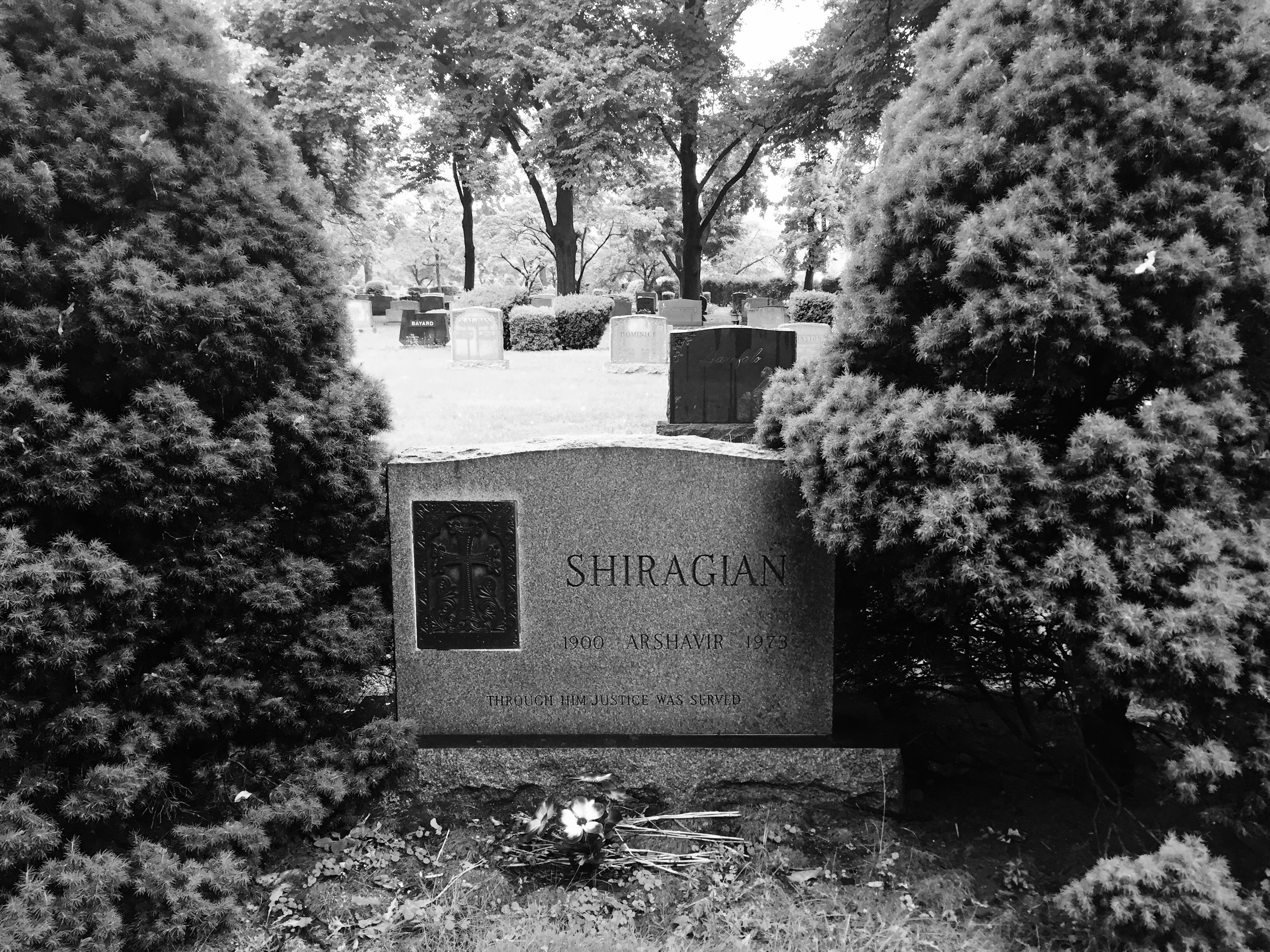
Shirakian's headstone at Hackensack Cemetery in Hackensack, New Jersey

Arshavir Shirakian eventually married his wife Kayane and moved to New York in 1923, where they had a daughter, Sonia. He also was active in public life in the New York/New Jersey area and its Armenian community. He published his memoirs in 1965 entitled Ktakn er Nahataknerun (translated in English as It Was the Legacy of the Martyrs). The memoirs were eventually translated into French (La dette du sang, 1982 and 1984), English (The Legacy, 1976, by Sonia Shiragian) and Italian (Condannato A Uccidere: Memorie di un Patriota Armeno, 2005, by Vasken Pambakian). A resident of Leonia, Shirakian died in 1973 at the age of 73 at Englewood Hospital in Englewood, New Jersey. He is buried in the Hackensack Cemetery in New Jersey. He is recognized and honored as a national hero by Armenians. His daughter Sonia, died in Florence, South Carolina where she is buried with her husband. She is survived by three children: Elizabeth Poston, Melineh Verma, and Arshavir Blackwell.
