= Imperial Firman of 27 May 1866 =

The Imperial Firman Relative to Hereditary Succession was a firman (i.e., decree) issued by the Sultan of the Ottoman Empire Abdülaziz on 27 May 1866 at the request of Isma'il Pasha, the wāli (i.e. governor) of Egypt, which was then an Ottoman province. The firman changed the rule of succession in Egypt from one based on agnatic seniority to one based on male primogeniture in the direct line of Isma'il Pasha. The full text of the firman read as follows:

Having considered the demand you have submitted to me, in which you inform me that a modification of the order of succession established by the Firman, addressed to your ancestor, Mehmed Ali-Pacha, dated on the 2nd of the month of Rebiul-Akhir, 1257, conferring upon him the Government à titre d'hérédité of the Province of Egypt, and the transmission of the succession from father to son, in a direct line by primogeniture, would be favorable to the good administration of Egypt and the development of the well-being of the inhabitants of that Province—
Appreciating in all their extent the efforts you have made toward this end since your nomination to the Government-General of Egypt, which is one of the most important provinces of my Empire, as well as the fidelity and devotion of which you have never ceased to give me proofs; and wishing upon my part to give you a striking testimony of the good-will and entire confidence I accord to you, I have decided that henceforth the Government of Egypt and the annexed territories and dependencies shall be transmitted to your eldest son, and in the same manner to the eldest sons of his successors.
If the Governor-General leaves no male heir, the succession will fall to his eldest brother, and in default of brothers, to the eldest son of the eldest brother. This shall be hereafter the law of succession in Egypt. Moreover, the conditions contained in the foregoing Firman are, and remain always in force as heretofore; each one of the conditions will be constantly observed, and the maintenance of the privileges which flow from these conditions will depend upon the integral observance of each one of the obligations which they impose.
The pledges more recently accorded by my Imperial Government-General of Egypt to maintain 30,000 effective troops, to create a difference between the moneys coined in Egypt, in my Imperial name, and the other moneys of my Empire, to confer the civil grades of my Government as high as the rank of Sanié (second rank of the first class), are equally confirmed.
The law which interdicts the succession of the male descendants of the daughters of the Governors will be maintained in future as in past.
The tribute of 80,000 bourses, paid by Egypt into the Imperial Treasury, is increased to 150,000 bourses, commencing March, 1866.
My Imperial Trade being issued to put into execution the preceding conditions, the present Firman, bearing my Imperial signet, has been transmitted to you by my Chancellerie.
It is incumbent upon you, with that loyalty and zeal which characterizes you, profiting by the knowledge you have acquired of the requirements of Egypt, to consecrate yourself to the good administration of that country; to labor to assure to the people entire security and tranquillity; and, recognizing the value of the pledge I have just given you of my Imperial favor, to observe with fidelity the conditions as established above.

Done 12th day of the Month of Muharram, 1283.

It was reported that Isma'il Pasha spent approximately $5,000,000 in gifts to the Sultan and to his ministers in order to obtain this decree altering the rule of succession in Egypt. The firman restricted succession to the throne to Isma'il Pasha's sons. The latter's uncle, Prince Muhammad Abdul Halim (son of the dynasty's founder Muhammad Ali Pasha), who had been hitherto heir apparent under the old system of agnatic seniority, was thus stripped of his place in the line of succession. Accordingly, he opposed Isma'il Pasha and his successor Tewfik Pasha. Prince Muhammad Abdul Halim's son, Said Halim Pasha, continued to claim Egypt's throne after his father's death.
