= Armenian genocide in Trebizond =

Aspect of Armenian history

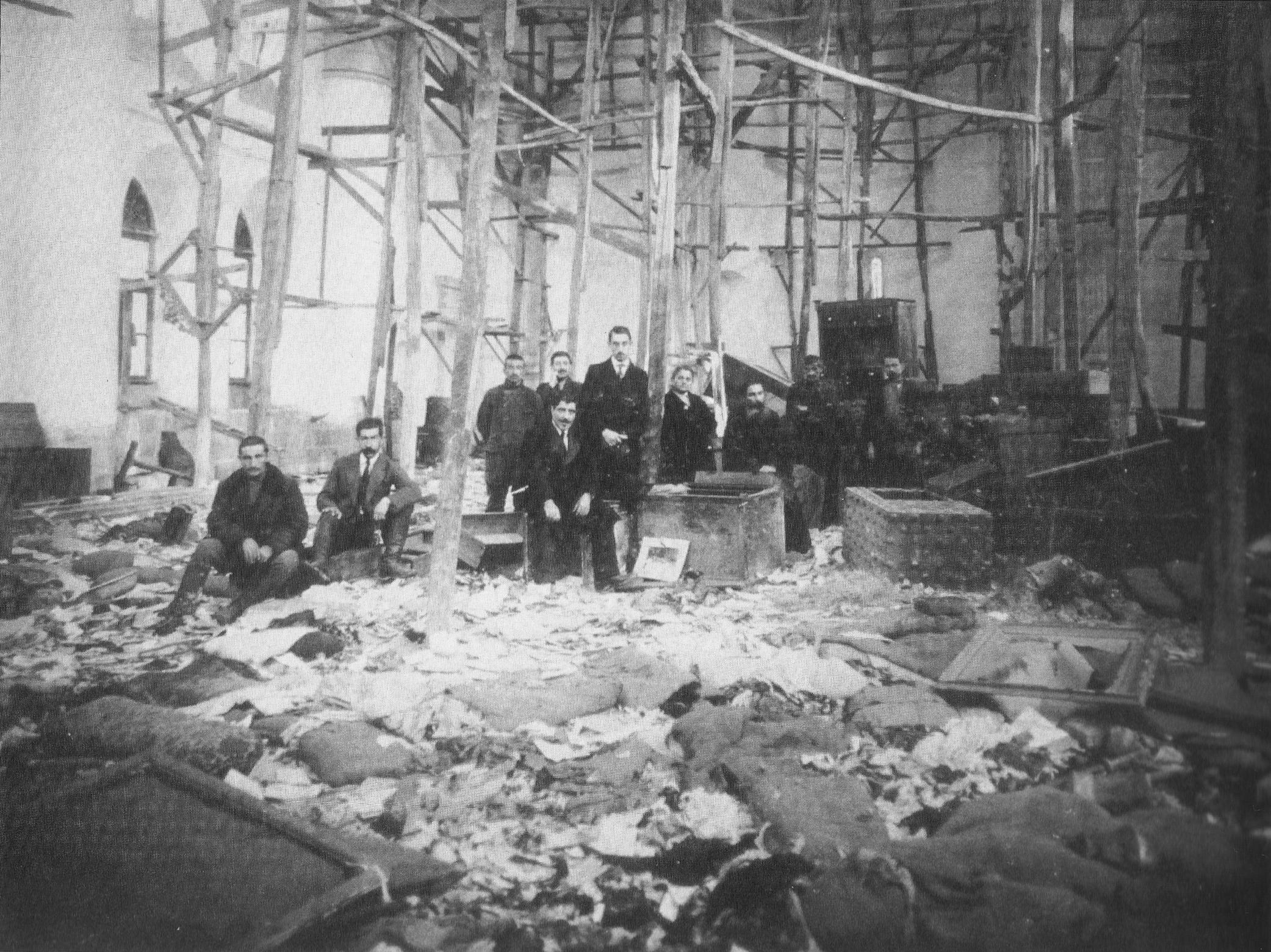
The Armenian church of Trebizond, used as an auction site of confiscated Armenian goods during the war and after the Armenian genocide in 1918

Trebizond (now Trabzon) was a city in the Ottoman Empire where the Armenian genocide occurred. The method employed to kill was mainly by mass drowning, resulting in estimated deaths of 50,000 Armenians. The city was also an important location of subsequent trials held to prosecute those involved with the systematic massacre. Cemal Azmi, the governor of Trebizond during the genocide, was later assassinated as part of Operation Nemesis.

== Background ==
The city was the site of one of the key battles between the Ottoman and Russian armies during the Caucasus Campaign of World War I which resulted in the capture of Trebizond by the Russian Caucasus Army under command of Grand Duke Nicholas and Nikolai Yudenich in April 1916. The Russian Army retreated from the city and the rest of eastern and northeastern Anatolia with the Russian Revolution of 1917.

== The genocide ==
Eitan Belkind was a Nili member who infiltrated the Ottoman army as an official. He was assigned to the headquarters of Camal Pasha. He claimed to have witnessed the burning of 5,000 Armenians, Lt. Hasan Maruf, of the Ottoman army, described how a population of a village were taken all together and then burned. Also, the Commander of the Third Army, Vehib's 12-page affidavit, which was dated December 5, 1918, presented in the Trebizond trial series (March 29, 1919) included in the Key Indictment (published in Takvimi Vekayi, No. 3540, May 5, 1919), reported such a mass burning of the population of an entire village near Mus. S. S. McClure wrote in his work Obstacles to Peace (Houghton Mifflin Company, 1917, pp. 400–1) that in Bitlis, Mus and Sassoun, "The shortest method for disposing of the women and children concentrated in tile various camps was to burn them" and also that "Turkish prisoners who had apparently witnessed some of these scenes were horrified and maddened at the remembering the sight. They told the Russians that the stench of the burning human flesh permeated the air for many days after."

The Germans, Ottoman allies, also witnessed the way Armenians were burned according to the Israeli historian, Bat Ye'or, who writes: "The Germans, allies of the Turks in the First World War, ...saw how civil populations were shut up in churches and burned, or gathered en masse in camps, tortured to death, and reduced to ashes,..."

== The trials ==
During the Trebizond trial series, of the court martial (from the sittings between March 26 and May 17, 1919), the Trebizond Health Services Inspector Dr. Ziya Fuad wrote in a report that Dr. Saib, caused the death of children with the injection of morphine, the information was allegedly provided by two physicians (Drs. Ragib and Vehib), both Dr. Saib colleagues at Trebizond's Red Crescent hospital, where those atrocities were said to have been committed.

Dr. Ziya Fuad, and Dr. Adnan, public health services director of Trebizond, submitted affidavits, reporting a cases, in which, two school buildings were used to organize children and then sent them on the mezzanine, to kill them with a toxic gas equipment. This case was presented during the Session 3, p.m., 1 April 1919, also published in the Constantinople (now Istanbul) newspaper Renaissance, 27 April 1919. The Ottoman surgeon, Dr. Haydar Cemal wrote in Türkçe İstanbul, No. 45, 23 December 1918, also published in Renaissance, 26 December 1918, that "on the order of the Chief Sanitation Office of the IIIrd Army in January 1916, when the spread of typhus was an acute problem, innocent Armenians slated for deportation at Erzincan were inoculated with the blood of typhoid fever patients without rendering that blood 'inactive'." Jeremy Hugh Baron writes:

Individual doctors were directly involved in the massacres, having poisoned infants, killed children and issued false certificates of death from natural causes. Nazim's brother-in-law Dr. Tevfik Rushdu, Inspector-General of Health Services, organized the disposal of Armenian corpses with thousands of kilos of lime over six months; he became foreign secretary from 1925 to 1938.

The psychiatrist, Robert Jay Lifton, writes in a parenthesis when introducing the crimes of Nazi doctors in his book Nazi Doctors: Medical Killing and the Psychology of Genocide, ("Perhaps Turkish doctors, in their participation in the genocide against the Armenians, come closest, as I shall later suggest)." Oscar S. Heizer, the American consul at Trebizond, reports: "This plan did not suit Nail Bey.... Many of the children were loaded into boats and taken out to sea and thrown overboard."

The Italian consul of Trebizond in 1915, Giacomo Gorrini, writes: "I saw thousands of innocent women and children placed on boats which were capsized in the Black Sea." Hoffman Philip, the American Charge at Constantinople chargé d'affaires, writes: "Boat loads sent from Zor down the river arrived at Ana, one thirty miles away, with three fifths of passengers missing."
