= Fatali Khan Khoyski =

Azerbaijani attorney (1875–1920)

- Fətəli xan Xoyski
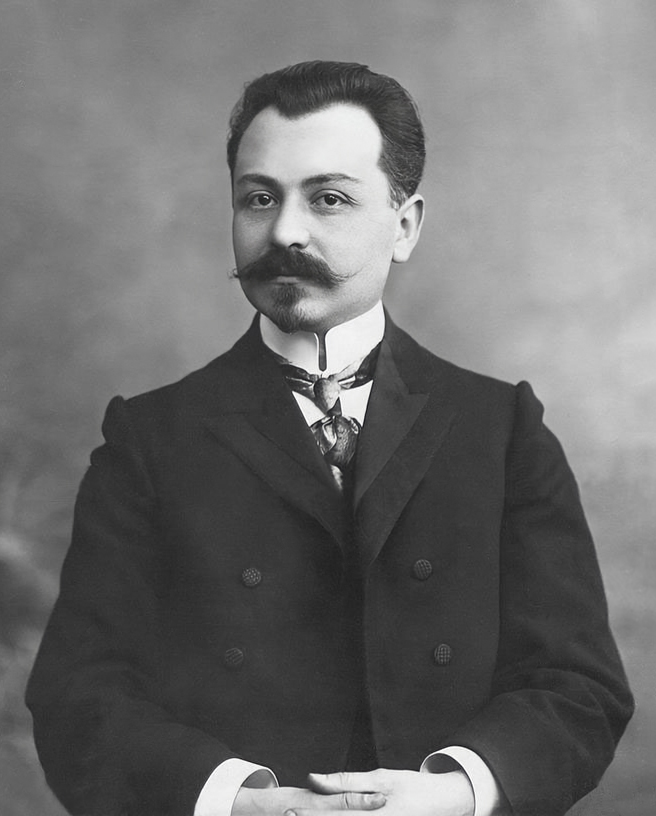
- Khoyski in 1906

Minister of Foreign Affairs of Azerbaijan Democratic Republic (ADR)
- In office 26 December 1918 – 14 March 1919
- President: Alimardan Topchubashov (Chairman of Azerbaijani Parliament)
- Preceded by: Alimardan Topchubashev
- Succeeded by: Mammad Yusif Jafarov
- In office 24 December 1919 – 1 April 1920
- President: Mammad Yusif Jafarov.(Chairman of Azerbaijani Parliament) (acting)
- Preceded by: Mammad Yusif Jafarov
- Succeeded by: office eliminated

Minister of Internal Affairs of ADR
- In office 28 May 1918 – 17 June 1918
- Preceded by: office created
- Succeeded by: Behbud Khan Javanshir

Minister of Defense of ADR
- In office 18 November 1918 – 25 December 1918
- Preceded by: office re-established
- Succeeded by: Samad bey Mehmandarov

Chairman of the Council of Ministers of the Azerbaijan Democratic Republic
- In office 28 May 1918 – 14 April 1919
- Preceded by: Office established
- Succeeded by: Nasib bey Yusifbeyli

Personal details
- Born: 7 December [O.S. 25 November] 1875 Nukha (Shaki), Nukha uezd, Elizavetpol Governorate, Russian Empire
- Died: 19 June 1920 (aged 44) Tiflis (later Tbilisi), Democratic Republic of Georgia
- Cause of death: Assassination by gunshot

Military service
- Battles/wars: World War I; Caucasus Campaign; Battle of Binagadi; Battle of Goychay; Battle of Baku; Armenian–Azerbaijani war (1918–1920); Battle of Nakhchivan; Red Army invasion of Azerbaijan

Fatali Khan Iskandar Khan oghlu Khoyski (Note: Alternative spellings include Fatali-Khan Khoysky, Fatali Khan Khoisky, Fath Ali Khan Khoisky, Fath Ali Khan Khoysky, Fathali Khan Khoisky, and Fathali Khan Khoysky.) (Azerbaijani: فتحعلی خان اسکندر خان اوغلی خویسکی, Fətəli xan İsgəndər xan oğlu Xoyski; 7 December [O.S. 25 November] 1875 – 19 June 1920) was an Azerbaijani attorney, a member of the Second State Duma of the Russian Empire, Minister of Internal Affairs, Minister of Defense and, later the first Prime Minister of the independent Azerbaijan Democratic Republic.

== Early life ==
Fatali Khan Iskandar Khan oghlu Khoyski was born on 7 December [O.S. 25 November] 1875 in Nukha (present-day Shaki) to the noble family of Iskandar Khan Khoyski, a colonel in the Russian Army. His great grandfather Jafar Qoli, the Khan of Khoy was defeated by the Iranian Fath-Ali Shah and with his 20,000 army retreated to Echmiadzin. In the 1804-1813 Russo-Persian war, Jafar Qoli Khan sided with Russian Empire and was therefore rewarded by tsar Alexander I by being appointed the Khan of Shaki Khanate and his rank was raised to lieutenant colonel. It is stated that the original surname of the Khoyski family was Dunbuli Batmankylinch. The surname “Khoyski” began to be used after General Tsitsianov presented Jafar Qoli Khan to Emperor Alexander I of Russia with the title “Khan Khoyski.”

He began his early education at the Ganja Classical Gymnasium and, after ten years of study, graduated in 1893. At the gymnasium, he learned Russian, Greek, Latin, French, and German. Fatali Khan studied at the Law Faculty of the Moscow University, from which he graduated in 1901. After graduation, Khoyski worked as a court lawyer in Ganja, Sukhumi, Batumi, Kutaisi. Once he was appointed Assistant Prosecutor of Yekaterinodar county court, he began to be involved in socio-political activities.

== Political career ==
=== Russian Empire ===
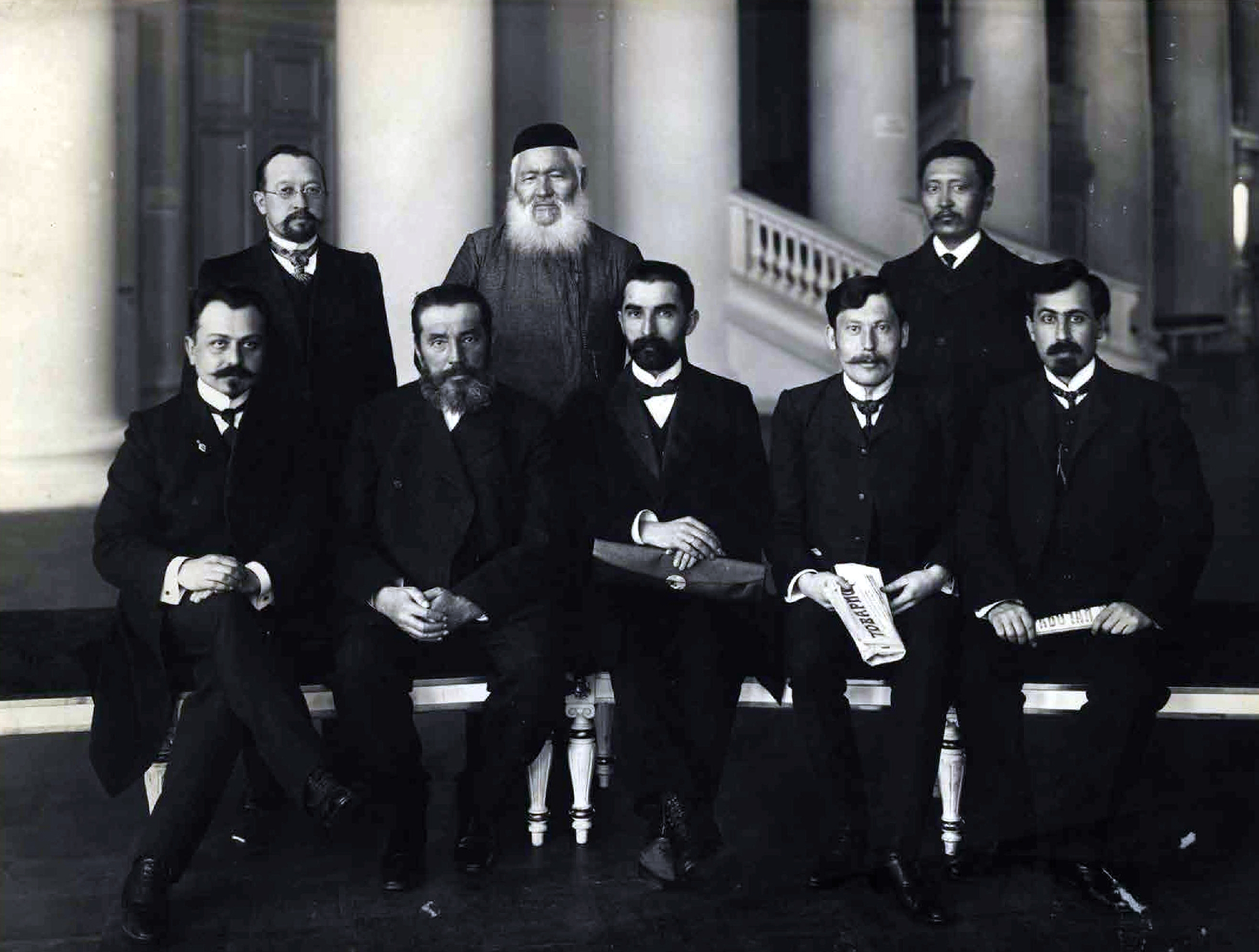
Fatali Khan Khoyski (seated left) with a group of deputies of the II State Duma Muslims. 1907

Khoyski was elected a deputy to the Second Duma of Russian Empire from Elizavetpol Governorate. While delivering a speech before the Duma on 2 February 1907, he criticized the Russian colonization policies in Azerbaijan and the Caucasus. Although he was formally registered with Constitutional Democratic Party (known as the Kadets), he also joined the Muslim fraction in Duma. On 27 March, soon after the 1917 February revolution in Russia, Khoyski became a member of the Temporary Executive Committee of Muslim National Councils (MNCs). He also took part in organizing and participating in the Baku Congress of the Muslims of the Caucasus. In the same year, he was elected chairman of the Baku City Duma, representing the Muslim bloc with over 10,000 votes. The Baku City Duma under Khoyski’s leadership was regarded as the main rival of the Baku Soviet, which had seized power through violent clashes.

During the first Musavat summit on 26–31 October 1917, Khoyski spoke in favor of autonomy for Azerbaijan. In December 1917, he was elected a member of the newly created Transcaucasian Sejm and subsequently appointed the Minister of Justice of an independent Transcaucasian Democratic Federative Republic.

=== Azerbaijan Democratic Republic ===
On 28 May 1918, the republic dissolved and an independent Azerbaijan Democratic Republic was proclaimed. It was the first state ever in the Muslim world to function and be based on principles of republic government. Fatali Khan was put in charge of forming the first cabinet of the republic.

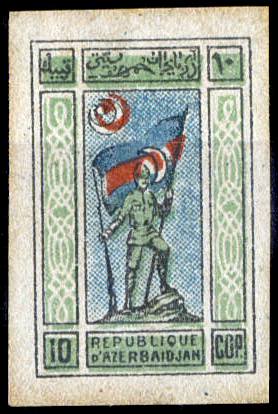
One of ADR stamps published on Khoyski's initiative

Prime Minister Khoyski had the distinct honor to send radiogram to the main political centers of the world on the proclamation of an independent Azerbaijan republic on 30 May 1918. When the government moved to its temporary residence in the city of Ganja the government encountered serious challenges. Azerbaijani statehood came under fire. On 17 June, Fatali Khan announced the resignation of the government at the closed session of the National Council but he was assigned to form the government again. In addition to the post of prime minister, he was the post of justice minister in the second government.

Khoyski served as the Chairman of Cabinet of Ministers and Minister of Internal Affairs. On 17 June 1918, the second government was formed by Khoyski led by Nasib Yusifbeyli. He played a significant role in making an alliance with the Turkish government, defeating and removing the Centrocaspian Dictatorship from power in Baku as well as establishing diplomatic ties with other countries. On 22 December, he was elected as a foreign minister of the newly formed government. Khoyski protected Azerbaijan's statehood in this post. Furthermore, he defended the independence of Azerbaijan by achieving the recognition of the independence of Azerbaijan at the Paris Peace Conference. He is also credited for establishing the Azerbaijan State University. During Khoyski’s second government, the state’s official language was established as Turkish, efforts were made to nationalize education, and the first steps were taken toward the formation of a national army. During the period of the third government formed by Khoyski, he served as Chairman of the National Council and Minister of Foreign Affairs of Azerbaijan. During his term in office, he succeeded in removing the city names Yelisavetpol and restoring the historic name of Ganja and renaming the uezd of Karyagino to Jabrayil, establishing a multi-party system, the printing of Azerbaijani postage stamps and Azerbaijani currency Manat, founding schools and colleges teaching in Azerbaijani. In March 1919, the third government dissolved.

In January 1920, when the Allied Powers de facto recognized Azerbaijan Democratic Republic, Council of Allied Powers, Georgy Chicherin, the Soviet Commissar for Foreign Affairs repeatedly mailed Khoyski asking him to open a new front to confront Anton Denikin and his White movement to which Fatali Khan gave negative responses saying ADR would not meddle into internal affairs of Russia. In his fourth last correspondence, Chicherin notified Khoyski about the upcoming invasion of the 11th Red Army of Azerbaijan. Khoyski moved his family to Tbilisi before the Bolshevik Red Army invaded Baku on 28 April 1920.

== Death ==
Fatali Khan Khoyski was assassinated in Tiflis (present-day Tbilisi), near the central Erivansky Square on 19 June 1920 by Aram Yerganian as part of Operation Nemesis organised by the Armenian Revolutionary Federation (ARF). The ARF said Khoyski had played a major role in the September 1918 massacre of Armenians in Baku. His burial ceremony was arranged by the Persian consulate in Tiflis. Khoyski was buried in Tiflis by Azerbaijani Turks living there, next to Mirza Fatali Akhundzade, who had contributed to the development of Azerbaijani theatre, and his grave remains in Tiflis to this day.

== Family ==
He was married in 1901 to an ethnic Russian woman, Eugenia Vasilevna, who upon converting to Islam, took the name Jeyran Khanum. They had three children, all of whom were born in Ganja:

1. Tamara Khoyskaya (1902-1990) — married to Mirza Davud Huseynov
2. Murad Khoyski (1910-1973)
3. Anvar Khoyski (1914-1935)

His elder brother Huseyngulu khan was deputy governor of Ganja Governorate between 1918 and 1920. Younger brother Rustam Khan Khoyski served as Minister of Social Security of Azerbaijan Democratic Republic.

== See also ==
- Azerbaijani National Council
- List of ministers of internal affairs of Azerbaijan
