= Rustam Khan Khoyski =

Rustam Khan Khoyski Rüstəm xan Xoyski
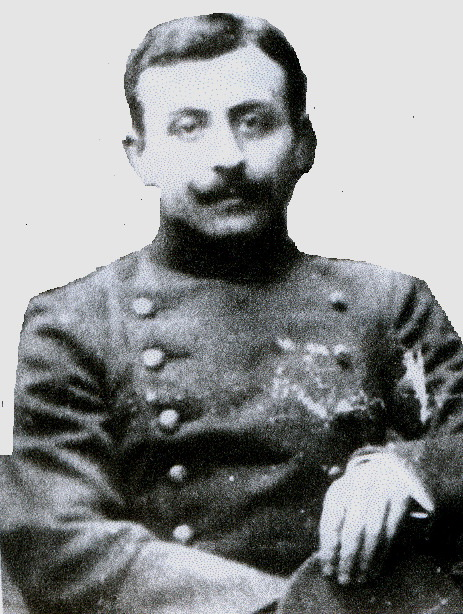

Minister of Social Security
- In office 26 December 1918 – 14 March 1919
- Prime Minister: Fatali Khan Khoyski
- Preceded by: Musa bey Rafiyev
- Succeeded by: Valerian Klenevski

Personal details
- Born: 17 November [O.S. 5 November] 1888 Elisabethpol, Elisabethpol Governorate, Russian Empire
- Died: 1948 (aged 59–60) Moscow, Russian SFSR, Soviet Union
- Education: Saint Petersburg State University

Military service
- Rank: Lieutenant General

Rustam Khan Khoyski (Azerbaijani: Rüstəm xan Xoyski; 1888–1948) was an Azerbaijani statesman who served as the Minister of Social Security of Azerbaijan Democratic Republic and was member of Azerbaijani National Council. Rustam Khan was the younger brother of a prominent Azerbaijani politician Fatali Khan Khoyski.

== Early years ==
Rustam Khan Khoyski was born to the family of Azerbaijani general Isgandar Khan Khoyski in Elisabethpol on 17 November [O.S. 5 November] 1888. After completing Elisabethpol Gimnasium, he graduated from the Law Department of Saint Petersburg State University in 1913. He then worked as a judge assistant in Ganja and Baku. Rustam Khan is recognized as one of the activists of the Azerbaijani Independence Movement.

== Political career ==
After establishment of Azerbaijan Democratic Republic on 28 May 1918 he worked as the Director of State Issues Department of Council of Ministers of ADR. When his brother Fatali Khan Khoyski formed the third cabinet of ADR, Rustam Khan was appointed the Minister of Social Security. After Bolshevik take over of Azerbaijan, Khoyski remained in the country and served as Chairman of the Azerbaijan SSR Economic Council Board. In the following years, he also worked as a corporate lawyer in Baku and Moscow. He died in Moscow in 1948. Rustam Khan Khoyski was buried at the Novodevichy Cemetery.

== See also ==
- Azerbaijani National Council
- Cabinets of Azerbaijan Democratic Republic (1918-1920)
- Current Cabinet of Azerbaijan Republic
