= List of ministers of internal affairs of Azerbaijan =

The minister of internal affairs of Azerbaijan (Azerbaijani: Azərbaycan Daxili İşlər Naziri) is the head of the Ministry of Internal Affairs of Azerbaijan. The person in this position is appointed and dismissed from the post by the president of Azerbaijan.

== List of ministers ==
=== Azerbaijan Democratic Republic ===
Ministers of internal affairs of the Azerbaijan Democratic Republic
| | Name | Term of office | Picture | Party |
|---|---|---|---|---|
| 1. | Fatali Khan Khoyski | 28 May 1918 — 17 June 1918 | | Non-party |
| 2. | Behbud Khan Javanshir | 17 June 1918 — 26 December 1918 | | Non-party |
| 3. | Khalil Khasmammadov | 26 December 1918 — 16 June 1919 | | Musavat |
| 4. | Nasib Yusifbeyli | 16 June 1919 — 22 December 1919 | | Musavat |
| 5. | Mammad Hasan Hajinski | 22 December 1919 — 15 February 1920 | | Musavat |
| 6. | Mustafa Vakilov | 15 February 1920 — 28 April 1920 | | Non-party |

=== Azerbaijan Soviet Socialist Republic ===
Ministers of internal affairs of the Azerbaijan Soviet Socialist Republic
| | Name | Term of office | Picture | Party |
|---|---|---|---|---|
| 1. | Hamid Sultanov | 28 April 1920 — 1 June 1921 | | Communist Party of the Soviet Union |
| 2. | Mir Jafar Baghirov | 5 October 1921 — 22 May 1927 | | Communist Party of the Soviet Union |
| 3. | Novruz Rzayev | 22 May 1927 — 10 June 1929 | | Communist Party of the Soviet Union |
| 4. | Stepan Yemelyanov | 1 August 1929 — ? | | Communist Party of the Soviet Union |
| 5. | Yuvelian Sumbatov-Topuridze | 1 January 1937 — 10 January 1938 | | Communist Party of the Soviet Union |
| 6. | Mixail Rayev-Kaminski | 10 January 1938 — 12 November 1938 | | Communist Party of the Soviet Union |
| 7. | Stepan Yemelyanov | 11 February 1939 — 26 February 1941 | | Communist Party of the Soviet Union |
| 8. | Mir Teymur Yagubov | March 6, 1941 — May 1950 | | | Communist Party of the Soviet Union |
| 9. | Agasalim Atakishiyev | May 1950 — June 6, 1953 | | Communist Party of the Soviet Union |
| 10. | Stepan Yemelyanov | 16 March 1953 — June 28, 1953 | | Communist Party of the Soviet Union |
| 11. | Anatoly Guskov | 8 August 1953 — 25 March 1954 | | Communist Party of the Soviet Union |
| 12. | Ivan Buliga | 30 April 1954 — 10 July 1956 | | Communist Party of the Soviet Union |
| 13. | Ali Kerimov | 11 August 1956 — 5 February 1960 | | Communist Party of the Soviet Union |
| 14. | Khalil Mammadov | 3 November 1960 — 5 January 1965 | | Communist Party of the Soviet Union |
| 15. | Mamed Alizadeh | 5 January 1965 — 19 March 1970 | | Communist Party of the Soviet Union |
| 16. | Arif Heidarov | 19 March 1970 — 20 June 1978 | | Communist Party of the Soviet Union |
| 17. | Djafar Veliev | 4 November 1978 — 6 April 1987 | | Communist Party of the Soviet Union |
| 18. | Aidin Mamedov | 7 April 1987 — 9 May 1990 | | Communist Party of the Soviet Union |
| 19. | Mahammad Asadov | 23 May 1990 — 1991 | | Communist Party of the Soviet Union |

=== Republic of Azerbaijan ===
Interior ministers of Azerbaijan
| | Name | Term of office | Picture |
|---|---|---|---|
| 1. | Mahammad Asadov | 1991 — 18 November 1991 | |
| 2. | Tofig Kerimov | 18 November 1991 — 20 February 1992 | |
| 3. | Tahir Aliev | 24 February 1992 — 25 May 1992 | |
| 4. | Isgandar Hamidov | 26 May 1992 — 16 April 1993 | |
| 5. | Abdulla Allahverdiev | 21 April 1993 — 25 June 1993 | |
| 6. | Vagif Novruzov | 7 June 1993 — 29 April 1994 | |
| 7. | Ramil Usubov | 29 April 1994 — 20 June 2019 | |
| 8. | Vilayat Eyvazov | 20 June 2019 — | |

== See also ==
- Minister of Foreign Affairs (Azerbaijan)
- Ministry of Defence (Azerbaijan)
- Ministry of Internal Affairs (Azerbaijan)
