= Çürüksulu Mahmud Pasha =

Ottoman general

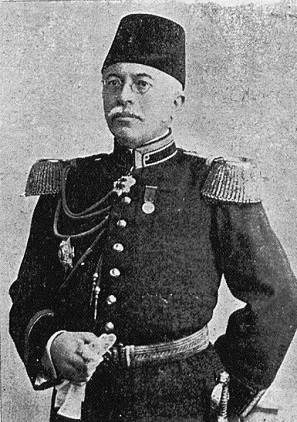

Minister of Public Works of the Ottoman Empire
- In office 10 March – 5 November 1914
- Monarch: Mehmed V
- Grand Vizier: Mehmed Said Halim Pasha
- Preceded by: Ahmed Cemal Pasha
- Succeeded by: Abbas Halim Pasha

Minister of War of the Ottoman Empire
- In office 5 October 1913 – 3 January 1914
- Monarch: Mehmed V
- Grand Vizier: Mehmed Said Alim Pasha
- Preceded by: Ahmed Izzet Pasha
- Succeeded by: Enver Pasha

Minister of the Navy of the Ottoman Empire
- In office 23 January 1913 – 9 March 1914
- Monarch: Mehmed V
- Grand Vizier: Mehmed Said Alim Pasha
- Preceded by: Mahmud Mukhtar Pasha
- Succeeded by: Ahmed Cemal Pasha

Personal details
- Born: 1864 Çürüksu, Lazistan Sanjak, Trebizond Vilayet, Ottoman Empire (present-day Kobuleti, Adjara, Georgia)
- Died: 31 July 1931 (aged 66) Istanbul, Turkey
- Party: Committee of Union and Progress

Çürüksulu Mahmud Pasha (Turkish: Çürüksulu Mahmut Paşa; 1864 – 31 July 1931), was an Ottoman army general and statesman of ethnic Georgian background.

== Early life and career ==
Mahmud Pasha was born in 1864 in Kobuleti, then part of the Ottoman Empire known by its Turkish name Çürüksu, in the present-day Adjara region of the Republic of Georgia.

After 1909, Mahmud Pasha took part in the modernization of the Ottoman army under the auspices of German High Command. He served as the Minister of Public Works in the CUP government.

When World War I broke out in 1914, Mahmud Pasha opposed the Ottoman participation in view of the unpreparedness of the armed forces. He was known as an outspoken but a respected figure in the Committee of Union and Progress (CUP). Later in the war, Mahmud Pasha served as the Minister of the Navy in the CUP cabinet of Talaat Pasha.

In 1914, Mahmud Pasha's candidacy was put forward by the Sultan to serve in the Ottoman Senate (Ayân Meclisi). After the defeat of the Ottoman Empire in WWI, Mahmud Pasha led the commission to negotiate peace. Mahmud Pasha's support for territorial concessions to reach an agreement with Armenians in 1919 drew criticism from Mustafa Kemal Atatürk in Nutuk.

On March 22, 1920, Mahmud Pasha was among the few CUP members arrested and sent by the British authorities for a tribunal in Malta. Upon their repatriation in 1921, he returned to Turkey and joined the forces of Mustafa Kemal Atatürk to take part in the Turkish War of Independence. Mahmud Pasha died in Istanbul on July 31, 1931.
