= Huseyngulu Khan Khoyski =

Russian general

- Azerbaijani: Hüseynqulu xan Xoyski
- Born: Huseyngulu Khan Khoyski Isgander Khan Khoyski oglu September 22, 1870; Ganja, Elizavetpol Governorate, Russian Empire
- Died: June 30, 1955 (aged 84); Istanbul, Turkey
- Spouse: Shirinbeyim khanum Ziyadkhanova
- Children: Valiyya khanum Khoyskaya; Isgandar Khan Khoyski; Zahid Khan Khoyski
- Military career
- Allegiance: Russian Empire; Azerbaijan Democratic Republic (from 1918 to 1920)
- Branch: Cavalry
- Service years: 1887 — 1920
- Rank: Colonel
- Awards: 2nd Class Ode of Saint Stanislaus 3rd Class Ode of Saint Stanislaus 3rd Class Order of Saint Anne

Huseyngulu Khan Khoyski (Azerbaijani: Hüseynqulu xan Xoyski; September 22, 1870, in Yelisavetpol (modern-day Ganja), Elizavetpol Governorate, Russian Empire – 1955, in Istanbul, Turkey) was a Colonel of the Army of the Democratic Republic of Azerbaijan, elder brother of the Prime Minister of the Democratic Republic of Azerbaijan Fatali khan Khoyski.

== Life ==
Khoyski was born on 22 September 1870 in Ganja to the noble family of Isgender Khoyski, a Lieutenant general in the Russian Army. His great grandfather Jafar Qoli, the Khan of Khoy was defeated by the Iranian Fath-Ali Shah and with his 20,000 army retreated to Echmiadzin. In the 1804-1813 Russo-Persian war, Jafar Qoli Khan sided with Russian Empire and was therefore rewarded by tsar Alexander I by being appointed the Khan of Shaki Khanate and his rank was raised to lieutenant colonel.

On July 22, 1887, he was enlisted in the 45th Seversky Dragoon Regiment of the Russian Empire. For his services to the state, he received the Order of St. Stanislav, 2nd and 3rd degree, the Order of St. Anna, 3rd degree, and the Order of St. Alexander Nevsky.

While living in Ganja, he was engaged in social and political activities.

In 1917 he took part in the Congress of Muslims of the Caucasus. During the period of independence of the Azerbaijan Democratic Republic, he became deputy governor-general of Ganja, Khudadat bey Rafibeyov. After the occupation of Azerbaijan by the Bolsheviks, he took with him his wife Shirinbeyim Khanym (she was the daughter of a descendant of the Ganja Khan Javad Khan, the daughter of Valiyya, the 6-month-old grandson of Abbas and the son-in-law of Colonel Jahangir bey Kazimbeyli, who headed uprising and left for Qajar Iran, and from there to Turkey. He died in Istanbul in 1955 and was buried in the Feriköy Cemetery.

== Family ==
Huseyngulu khan married Shirinbeyim khanum Abulfat khan gizi Ziyadkhanova. His youngest son Zahid khan Khoyski was born in 1910 in Ganja and later lived in New York. He named his grandson after his great-grandfather, khan of Khoy Jafargulu khan. His younger brother Fatali Khan Khoyski was one of the founders and prime ministers of the Democratic Republic of Azerbaijan.

== Souuce ==
- Dilgam Ahmad (2018). Mühacirlərin dönüşü. Baku: Teas press.
