= Oscar S. Heizer =

American diplomat and eyewitness to the Armenian genocide (1868–1956)

Oscar Heizer

Oscar S. Heizer (February 7, 1868 – August 1, 1956) was an American diplomat who served in various posts as Consul General in the Ottoman Empire. Heizer, who was the Consul General in Trebizond during World War I, witnessed the Armenian genocide and often risked his own life to save the lives of Armenians.

== Armenian genocide ==
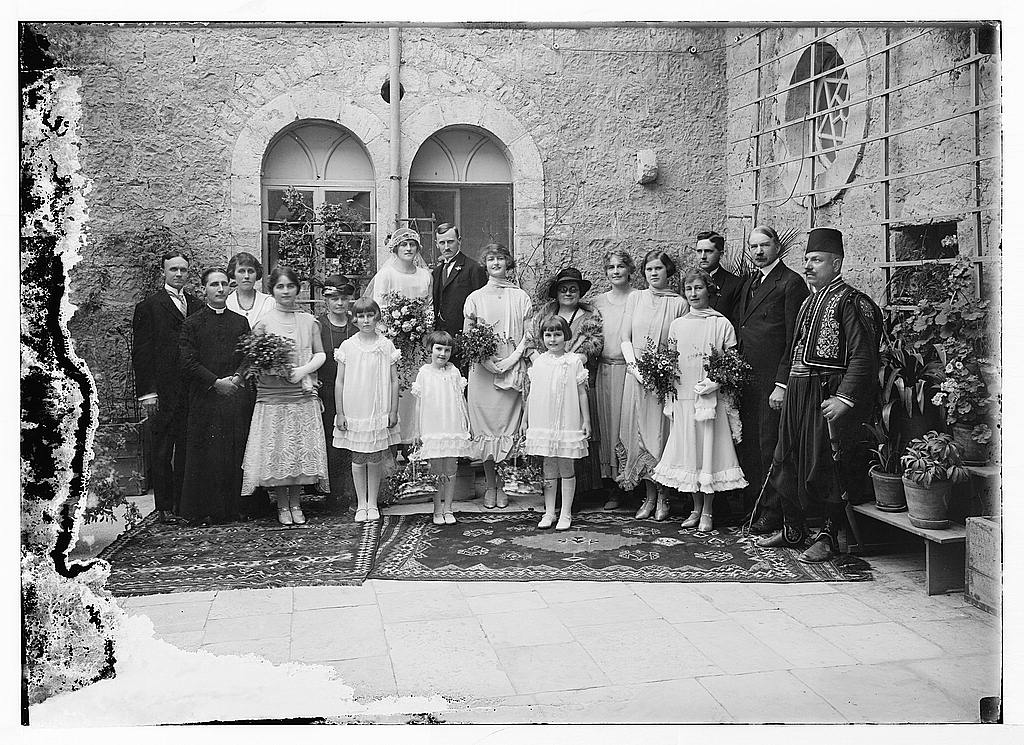
Heizer standing second from the right at a wedding

Oscar S. Heizer was one of the first individuals to report the mass murder of Armenians. During the Armenian Genocide, Heizer was the Consul General of Trabzon, a city on the coast of the Black Sea. During the Genocide, Heizer's initial reporting to the American consulate stationed in Constantinople states that it was authorized "whenever the parents so desire" to leave children – girls up to the age of 15 and boys up to the age of ten – in the "orphanages by the Turks." Heizer also describes how some children were assimilated into Muslim Turks in a matter of weeks.

Heizer also uncovered the direct link between the central government in Constantinople and a local Committee of Union and Progress functionary Nail Bey. In a letter to the American ambassador in Constantinople, Heizer writes: "The real authority here seems to be in the hands of a committee of which Nail Bey is the head and apparently receives his orders from Constantinople and not from the vali (governor)." Heizer also reveals that Nail Bey insisted that Armenian children be deported rather than being cared for.

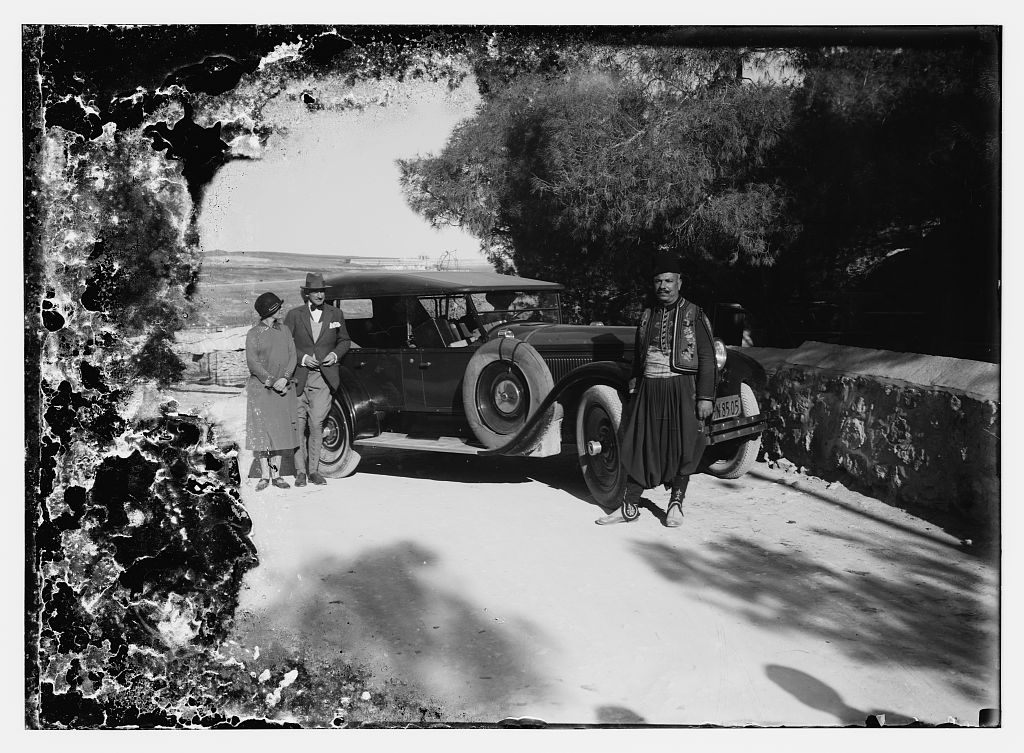
American Consul Heizer and wife beside auto (This is NOT Oscar Heizer OR his wife. CJ Heizer his Great Grandson)

Heizer reported how Armenians were being thrown overboard in boats: "This plan did not suit Nail Bey ... Many of the children were loaded into boats and taken out to sea and thrown overboard. I myself saw where 16 bodies were washed ashore and buried by a Greek woman near the Italian monastery." Heizer also states that a group of members of the Armenian Revolutionary Federation were placed on a boat and drowned.

According to the report of Oscar Heizer written to ambassador Henry Morgenthau, the first convoy of deportees was put on the road on July 1, 1915. On that day, troops surrounded certain Armenian neighborhoods of Trabzon and proceed to expel 2,000 inhabitants of the city, who then were taken in small groups to a place known as Deyirmen Dere, located ten minutes outside the city, and from there led off in the direction of Gümüşhane. A total of 6,000 people left the city between July 1 and July 3; approximately 4,000 more left the surrounding villages. Initially, the authorities had declared that Catholics and Protestants, as well as incapacitated old people, children, and pregnant women, would be "maintained". However, no exceptions were made, and the exempted individuals were dispatched with the last convoy that set out on July 5.

Heizer stated that most of the deportees were murdered shortly after they were told to leave. He described the situation of the Armenians when the deportations began:

It is impossible to convey an idea of the consternation and despair the publication os this proclamation has produced upon the people. I have seen strong, proud, wealthy men weep like children while they told me that they had given their boys and girls to Persian and Turkish neighbors. Even a strong man, without the necessary outfit and food would likely to perish on such a trip ... The People are helpless but are making preparations to start on the perilous journey.

The deportations measures throughout the province of Trabzon were also applied to 16 localities located south and west of the center, with an Armenian population of around 7,000, 3,517 of which lived in the province of Akcabat. Heizer reported that the men in these localities were apparently killed in their villages by members of the Special Organization.

Heizer also described the circumstances of life insurance policies of the deportees. Heizer describes in a letter to Morgenthau about the life insurance policies left behind by the deportees at Reverend Robert Stapleton's residence (member of the American Mission in Erzurum). Stapleton invited Heizer to discuss what to do with the insurance policies of the deportees. Heizer describes the visit as follows:

Arrangements were immediately made and I left Trebizond August 12th on horseback accompanied by cavass (team leader) Ahmed and a caterdjia (horse-man) with my traveling outfit, also two mounted gendarmes furnished by Governor General. I reached Erzerum about midnight August 17th and was allowed to enter the city gate only after communicating with the Commandant. I found two American families well. Rev. Robert S. Stapleton, who is director of the American schools and Treasurer of the Mission Stations, is living with his wife and two daughter in the upper story of the Boys' School building. Dr. Case and wife and two small children were living in the upper part of the Hospital building, the lower part being used as a Red Crescent Hospital ... Over 900 bales of goods of various kinds were deposited by 150 Armenians in Rev. Stapleton's house for safekeeping. There are also about 500 bales in Dr. Case's house and stable. The value of the bales is estimated by Mr. Stapleton at from Ltq. 10,000 to Ltq. 15,000 [equivalent of $50,000 to $75,000] ... Many policies of insurance in the New York Life Ins. Co. were found in these packages ...

Oscar S. Heizer also reported to the American Embassy in Istanbul in July 1915 about the confiscation of Armenian goods and property:

The 1,000 Armenian houses are being emptied of furniture by the police one after the other. The furniture, bedding and everything of value is being stored in large buildings about the city. There is no attempt at classification and the idea of keeping the property in 'bales under the protection of the government to be returned to the owners on their return' is simply ridiculous. The goods are piled in without any attempt at labeling or systematic storage. A crowd of Turkish women and children follow the police about like a lot of vultures and seize anything they can lay their hands on and when the more valuable things are carried out of the house by the police they rush in and take the balance. I see this performance every day with my own eyes. I suppose it will take several weeks to empty all the houses and then the Armenian shops and stores will be cleared out. The commission that has the matter in hand is now talking of selling the great collection of household goods and property in order to pay the debts of the Armenians. The German Consul told me that he did not believe the Armenians would be permitted to return to Trebizond after the war.

Heizer was later assigned to Baghdad where he continued to witness the execution of Armenians. Heizer describes what he witnessed as follows:

Nearly two months ago a party of fifty refugees came in, of these thirty-seven were men, the rest women and children and their story was most interesting. Last winter they were in an Armenian Camp at Deir Ez-Zor. At various intervals batches of these prisoners were taken out into the desert and slaughter One method of killing the women was as follows: A large deep put was dug, a few Arabs were stationed at the bottom and the women thrown in one by one, those who were not killed by the fall, were dispatched by the slayers below. The party above mentioned were in turk taken out into the desert, some managed to escape and apparently two or three days out of the rest were left to starve.

== Later life ==
Heizer returned to the United States and was placed in charge of a governmental fund for the refugees of the Catastrophe of Smyrna. Heizer was in contact with many agencies throughout Greece and managed to collect $200,000 for the fund.

In 1923, Heizer was appointed American Consul in Jerusalem. In 1928, was acknowledged by American Jewish leaders as a great supporter of Zionism.

Heizer was married three times. He died August 1, 1956, and is buried at the Elmwood Cemetery in Charlotte, North Carolina.

== See also ==
- Armenian genocide in Trebizond
- Witnesses and testimonies of the Armenian genocide
