= Said Halim Pasha =

Grand Vizier of the Ottoman Empire from 1913 to 1917

- سعيد حليم
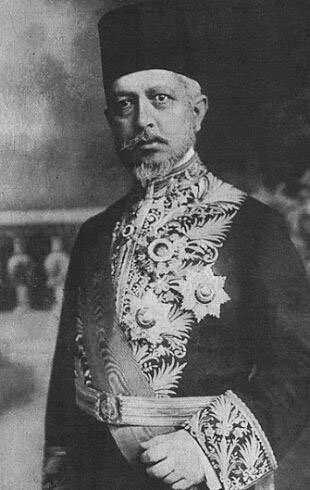

Grand Vizier of the Ottoman Empire
- In office 12 June 1913 – 4 February 1917
- Monarch: Mehmed V
- Preceded by: Mahmud Shevket Pasha
- Succeeded by: Talaat Pasha

Personal details
- Born: 18 or 28 January 1865 or 19 February 1864 Cairo, Egypt Eyalet, Ottoman Empire
- Died: 6 December 1921 (aged 56) Rome, Kingdom of Italy
- Party: Committee of Union and Progress
- Relations: Muhammad Ali Pasha (grandfather)

Mehmed Said Halim Pasha (Ottoman Turkish: سعيد حليم پاشا; Turkish: Sait Halim Paşa; 18 or 28 January 1865 or 19 February 1864 – 6 December 1921) was a writer and statesman who served as the Grand Vizier of the Ottoman Empire from 1913 to 1917. He is said to be one of the perpetrators of the Armenian genocide and he was later assassinated by Arshavir Shirakian as part of Operation Nemesis, a retribution campaign to kill genocidiers. It is unsure if he was actually involved, as he did not hold much political power and was kept in the dark on most matters of state by members of the Central Committee of the CUP.

== Early life ==
Mehmed Said Halim was born at the palace of Shubra in Cairo, Egypt to Muhammad Abd al-Halim Pasha, one of the sons of Muhammed Ali Pasha, the founder of the Khedivet of Egypt. He was of Albanian origin. In 1870, he and his family settled in Istanbul. He was educated by private teachers, and learned Arabic, Persian, English, and French. He later studied political science in Switzerland.

In 1890 or 1895, he married Emine İnci Tosun, daughter of Mehmed Tosun Pasha.

In the late 1890s the Prince Said Halim Pasha Palace in Downtown Cairo was built for him by the Italian architect Antonio Lasciac.

== Political career ==
In 1888, Said Halim was appointed a member of the Council of State with the rank of Mir-i Mîran, making him a civil Pasha. In 1900 he became Beylerbeyi of Rumeli. During this time he had good relations with Sultan Abdul Hamid II. Jealous courtiers spread rumors of Halim's disloyalty and propensity to read dangerous literature. Falling out of favor, he retired to his mansion, though his position in the Council of State was never officially terminated, only being dismissed from the council in September 1908. In 1903, he was exiled from the capital for establishing relations with the Young Turks. He went first to Egypt and then to Europe and established direct relations with the Young Turks, giving them material and intellectual support. In 1906, he was appointed a leading role in the Committee of Progress and Union. Following the 1908 revolution, he returned to Istanbul.

He was appointed as the chief of the Yeniköy city council after its municipal election. He later became the Second Chief of the General Association of Municipalities (Cemiyet-i Umumiye-i Belediye İkinci Reisliği), and in 1908 he was appointed a member of the Ottoman Senate. He was made a member of the administrative council of the Darüşşafaka. From January to July 1912, he was President of Council of State in Said Pasha's cabinet. Halim was sent to Lausanne to negotiate a peace treaty to end the Italo-Turkish War in July 1912, but the change in government spelled his fall from cabinet and he had to return home.

Following his resignation, he was elected as the General Secretary of the Committee of Union and Progress (CUP), and was appointed to the Council of State for the second time in 1913 during Mahmud Şevket Pasha's viziership, and to the Ministry of Foreign Affairs three days later. After the assassination of Şevket Pasha on 11 June 1913, he was first given the rank of vizier and was appointed to the Grand Vizier's Office, and the next day (12 June 1913) to the office of the Grand Vizier (Prime Minister). He was a compromise candidate for the CUP; Said Halim was more conservative and Islamist than the central committee would have wanted, however the prestige of his ancestry and his lack of agency made him an acceptable Grand Vizier to the CUP.

== Grand Viziership ==
In September 1913, he was honored with the Order of Distinction by Sultan Mehmed V for his service in signing the achieving a peace deal with the Bulgarians, and anchoring the border to the Maritsa river, beyond Edirne.

He was one of the signatures of Ottoman–German Alliance, which was signed in his mansion in Yeniköy with the German ambassador, Baron Wangenheim. Yet, he attempted to resign after the incident of the pursuit of Goeben and Breslau, an event which served to bring the Ottoman Empire into the Great War. It is claimed that Sultan Reşad wanted a person in whom he trusted as Grand Vizier, and that he asked Said Halim to stay in his post as long as possible. When Britain annexed Egypt in 1914, Halim Pasha claimed the throne of the Egyptian monarchy based on a firman which changed Egyptian succession law half a century ago.

During the Armenian genocide, Said Halim signed the deportation orders for the Armenian population. The Armenian Patriarch Zaven I Der Yeghiayan appealed to him to cease the terror being committed against Armenians, which Said Halim replied to by claiming reports of arrests and deportations were being greatly exaggerated. Der Yeghiayan himself was later deported. As the war went on, he was increasingly sidelined by Talaat Bey and Enver Pasha.

He lost his Foreign Ministry to Halil Menteşe in 1915. Said Halim's premiership lasted until 1917, cut short because of continuous clashes between him and the CUP. Talaat, who was Interior Minister, succeeded him.

== Arrest and assassination ==
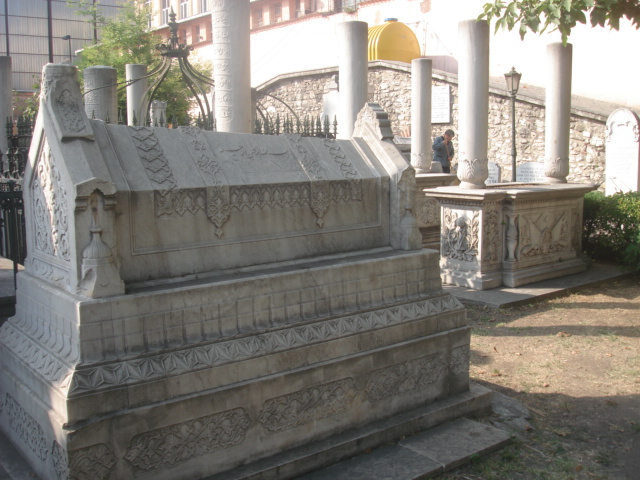
Said Halim Pasha's grave

Said Halim was accused of treason during the court martial trials after World War I in the Ottoman Empire for his role in deporting Armenian civilians and signing a secret alliance with Germany. He was exiled on 29 May 1919 to a prison on Malta. He was acquitted from the accusations and set free in 1921, and he moved to Sicily. He wanted to return to Istanbul, the capital of the Ottoman Empire, but this request was rejected. He was assassinated soon after in Rome by Arshavir Shirakian, an agent of the Armenian Revolutionary Federation, for his role in the Armenian genocide. According to Eşref Kuşçubaşı, who was involved in the planning of the Armenian death marches, Said Halim Pasha knew nothing of the genocide.

== Political writings and views ==
Under the nom de plume "Mehmed", Said Halim Pasha wrote several works of social commentary, comparative politics, and political philosophy during the Hamidian Era and Second Constitutional Era. He was a frequent contributor to Sebîlürreşâd, a pro-CUP Islamist journal.

=== As a social scientist ===
In a historical analysis, he claimed Islam was appropriate in the Western world's movement for equality due to (Sunni) Islam's lack of clergy and aristocracy, therefore in a civilizational sense, Islamic civilization was more egalitarian than the West. Indeed, he believed the West suffered from inherent inequalities inherent to their social structure, while Islamic civilization suffered from too much equality, leading to an Islamic civilization turning increasingly elitist and exclusive. He identified the origin of materialism emerged from the gap between the Church and the new discoveries of science and technology. The idea that Islam essentially discouraged technological innovation was refuted by Halim, though he did identify western materialism for having destroyed family values. Using the framework of historical materialism, he identified the cause of feminism appropriate among bourgeois women in developed Western-European societies, in contrast to upper-class Ottoman women which he believed were uninterested in further rights.

In 1916 he published Buhrân-ı İçtimaîmiz, where he castigates Ottoman society for leaving behind their past religion and culture.

While Western nation-states feature homogeneous societies of different classes that are always in conflict with each other, the Ottoman Empire's heterogeneity meant an Ottoman nationalism did not exist.

=== As a commentator ===
In the 1911 essay Meşrutiyet, he gave a retrospective analysis of the failures of the First Constitutional Era, particularly blaming the lack of a civic political culture developed by many peoples in the Empire. A desire among the Tanzimat statesmen for westernization for the sake of westernization veiled the fact that the Empire didn't much resemble France, Turkey's model. Despite the modern cosmopolitanism of the cities like Constantinople, Smyrna, or Salonica, much of the empire was still in a socio-economic state of feudalism, and not sufficiently "enlightened" for representative and constitutional government.

He was skeptical of the CUP's governance following the 31 March Incident, noting that the people toppling a dictator does not guarantee freedom.

Any administration is not the product of one person or even party; rather, it is almost the product of a particular generation. The sultan Abdulhamid was not the founder of the harsh rule that went by the name of the 'Hamidian' administration. Even if sultan Hamid had never been born, conditions would have been such that that generation would have produced another such sultan. The National Assembly, filled by members of the Committee of Union and Progress, was fired by patriotic zeal and revolutionary dreams, which foundered on the rocks of ignorance and inexperience.

== Cultural depictions ==
Iqbal writes in his Javid Nama how Rumi guides him to Mercury, where he sees Said Halim Pasha and Jemaluddin al-Afghani in prayer.

== Works ==
=== Essays ===
- Mukallidliklerimiz – 1910
- Meşrutiyet – 1911
- Buhrân-ı İçtimaîmiz – 1916 Kubbealtı Sahaf
- Ta'assup – 1917
- İnhitât-i Islam Hakkinda bir Tecrübe-i Kalemiyye – 1917
- İslâmlaşmak – 1918
- İslâm da Teşkîlât-ı Siyâsiyye/Les Institutions politiques dans la société musulmane/The Reform of Muslim Society – 1921

=== Other ===
- Buhranlarımız ve Son Eserleri – İz Yayıncılık
- Said Halim Paşa – Bütün Eserleri Anka Yayınları 2003

== See also ==
- Said Halim government
- Said Halim Pasha Mansion
- Operation Nemesis
- List of Ottoman grand viziers

== Literature ==
- Düzdağ, M. Ertuğrul (1991), Said Halim Paşa - Buhranlarımız ve Son Eserleri [Said Halim Pasha - Our Crises and Last Works] (in Turkish), Istanbul: İz Yayıncılık, Wikidata Q109923853
- Wasti, Syed Tanvir (2008). "Said Halim Pasha: Philosopher Prince". Middle Eastern Studies. 44 (1) (published January 2008): 85–104. ISSN 0026-3206. JSTOR 40262556. Wikidata Q109923750.
- Şeyhun, Ahmet (2014). "Said Halim Pasha (1865–1921)". Islamist Thinkers in the Late Ottoman Empire and Early Turkish Republic. Brill Publishers (published 31 October 2014). pp. 147–164. doi:10.1163/9789004282407_013. ISBN 978-90-04-28090-8. LCCN 2014030459. OCLC 904183804. OL 28177780M. Wikidata Q109923640.

Political offices
Preceded by Mahmud Şevket Pasha	Grand Vizier of the Ottoman Empire; 12 June 1913 – 4 February 1917	Succeeded by Talaat Pasha
