= Ministry of Finance (Ottoman Empire) =

Imperial ministry of the Ottoman Empire

- Ottoman Turkish: ماليه نظارتی; Maliye Nezâreti

Agency overview
- Formed: 1838
- Superseding agency: Ministry of Finance of the Republic of Turkey (2 May 1920)
- Jurisdiction: Ottoman Empire
- Headquarters: Constantinople

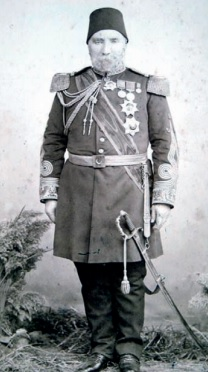
Hüseyin Tevfik Pasha, Ottoman Minister of Finance (January – July 1881, October 1897 – August 1898)

The Ministry of Finance (Ottoman Turkish: ماليه نظارتی; Turkish: Maliye Nezâreti) was a ministry of the Ottoman Empire. It became the late 19th century incarnation of the Defterdar (Grand Treasurer).

== Establishment ==
An aborted attempt to establish a Ministry of Finance came about in early 1838 under Sultan Mahmud II, but it was dissolved the next year during Hüsrev Pasha's brief period of dominance following the accession of Abdul Mecid to the throne, as he was hoping to grant the army financial independence. The Ministry of Finance was restored on 20 June 1839 soon after Mustafa Reşid Pasha's Gülhane proclamation, which combined the military and imperial treasuries.

== Organization ==
Upon its creation, it originally had two undersecretaries for the treasuries assigned to the ministry. After the Crimean War, Fuad Pasha introduced a Account Council (Divan-ı Muhasabat). In the 1860s and 70s, the council split into the Financial Council (Meclis-i Maliye) to prepare budgets, taxes, and tax collection, and the Financial Accounting Council (Meclis-i Muhasebe-i Maliye). The two treasuries were unified during this time.

== Successor ==
The modern finance ministry for Turkey is the Ministry of Finance (Turkey).

== See also ==
- List of Ottoman ministers of finance
