= Ministry of Evkaf =

Imperial ministry of the Ottoman Empire

- Ottoman Turkish: اوقاف همایون نظارتی; Evkaf-ı Hümâyun Nezâreti

Agency overview
- Formed: 1840
- Superseding agency: Directorate General of Foundations (3 March 1924)
- Jurisdiction: Ottoman Empire
- Headquarters: Constantinople

The Ministry of Evkaf (Ottoman Turkish: اوقاف همایون نظارتی; Turkish: Evkaf-ı Hümâyun Nezâreti) was an Ottoman Empire ministry in charge of awqaf (evkaf), administering waqfs (then known in Western languages as "vakouf", from the Turkish name). It was upgraded to a ministry in 1840 after being initially created in the century as the Bureau of Imperial Administration of Evkaf (French: Bureau d'Administration impériale de l'Evkaf).

== See also ==
- Evkaf Administration of Cyprus – Organization based in Cyprus
