= List of assassinations in Europe =

An assassination is defined as the deliberate, premeditated murder of a prominent figure.

Assassinations which took place on the continent of Europe include the following:

== Albania ==
No.	Name of victim(s)	Portrait	Highest position held	Date assassinated	Name of assassin(s)	Place of assassination	Suspected motive and description of the assassination
1	Hasan Rıza Pasha		General in the Ottoman-Albanian army of Scutari Vilayet	31 January 1913	Osman Bali, Mehmet Kavaja	A remote street near Rozafa Castle, Shkodër	Assailants were sent on the orders of Esad Toptani whose aim was to be the commander in charge of defending Shkodër from the invading Montenegrin forces.
2	Gjeto Çoku		Prefect of Lezhë	7 October 1913	Prenk Kol Brunga	Lezhë	Brunga was paid by the House of Prenk Bib Doda to eliminate the Prefect of Lezhë. Brunga, a paid guard in the Gendarmerie of Lezhë at the time, assassinated Gjeto Çoku at dusk as the Prefect was taking an evening stroll with Franz Nopcsa.
3	Lodewijk Thomson		Dutch military commander during the governance of Turhan Pasha.	15 June 1914	Unknown	Ura e Dajlanit, Durrës	Thomson made plenty of enemies during his short time of service in the country. The real motive of his murder has yet to be uncovered.
4	Nexhat Libohova		Minister of Finance	26 May 1915	Osman Bali	Shkallnur, Durrës	Political dispute with Esad Toptani.
5	Çerçiz Topulli		Commander of the Gjirokastër military band	17 July 1915	Montenegrin soldiers	Shtoji field, Golem, Shkodër	Revenge over the killing of the Greek bishop Photios in 1906.
6	Ded Gjo Luli		Leader of the Albanian revolt of 1911	24 September 1915	Unknown	Sheshëz, Orosh	Killed for nationalist motives.
7	Isa Boletini		Leader of the uprising to liberate Albanian lands	23 January 1916	Pero Burič	Ribnica bridge, Podgorica, Montenegro	Killed to suppress the Albanian resistance.
8	Stath Melani		Orthodox priest	24 December 1917	Josif Soropulli, Josif Stërmbeci, Vangjel Radimishti	Balta e kuqe, Lipivan, Përmet	Melani was killed by a group of Greek nationalists for insisting on the use of the Albanian language in the local Orthodox liturgy.
10	Prenk Bib Doda		Deputy Prime Minister	22 March 1919	Prenk Gjeto Çoku	Zejmen, Lezhë	Bib Doda was killed in an ambush, while traveling from Durrës to Shëngjin in the company of British diplomat Eden, who was wounded. The motive was revenge for Bib Doda's ordering the assassination of Prenk Gjeto Çoku's father, Gjeto Çoku, the Prefect of Lezhë.
11	Xhelal Koprëncka		Signatory of the Albanian Declaration of Independence	21 October 1919	Syrja Guri	Dëllinjë, Qafa e Martës, Skrapar	Murdered for personal revenge.
12	Sali Nivica		Journalist, Director of newspaper "Populli"	11 January 1920	Kolë Ashiku	A street near the Post Office, Shkodër	Killed for personal reasons.
13	Abdyl Ypi		Prefect of Durrës	15 January 1920	Sulejman Haxhi	Durrës	Killed on the orders of Mustafa Kruja as one of the initiators of the Congress of Lushnjë.
15	Meleq Frashëri		General Commander of the Gendarmerie	8 March 1922	Unknown	Kodër-Kamëz, Tirana	Killed during clashes with the rebels against the government.
17	George B. De Long; Robert L. Coleman		Real estate businessman Financier	6 April 1924	Local bandits	Ura e Përroit, Mamurras	The only conclusive motive for the murders was random burglary.
18	Avni Rustemi		Member of the Parliament	20 April 1924	Jusuf Reçi	Hoxha Tahsin St., Tirana	The motive of the assassination remains a mystery.
19	Azem Galica		Commander of a military band	25 July 1924	Yugoslavian forces	Galicë, Kosovo	Galica was killed by Yugoslav forces to suppress the movement against incorporating Kosovo into the newly formed state of Yugoslavia.
20	Elez Isufi		Commander of the Dibër Band	30 December 1924	Unknown assailants	Kazermat, Peshkopi	The murder of Isufi was widely seen as a treasonous act.
21	Luigj Gurakuqi		Served as Minister of Education two months prior.	2 March 1925	Balto Stamolla	Bari, Italy	Stamolla was a close relative of the Albanian Counsel in Bari, Çatin Saraçi.
22	Zija Dibra		Served as Minister of Public Works in the Evangjeli I Cabinet	6 January 1925	Unknown	Harizaj, Kavajë	Dibra was a fierce political opponent of prime minister Ahmet Zogu who came to power just two days after the assassination took place.
23	Bajram Curri		Served as Minister of War in 1921	29 March 1925	Unidentified	By a cave in Dragobi, Tropojë	Killed by assailants who were sent on the orders of Hysen Kryeziu, at the time serving as the Prefect of Kosovo.
24	Osman Bali		Commander of the Presidential Guard	5 September 1926	Myslim Peza, Islam Leka	Near Ura e Tabakëve, Tirana	The killing was due to political revenge.
25	Isuf Dibra		Served as Minister of War in the Toptani Cabinet	19 March 1927	Unknown	Tirana	Murdered by his assistant under unknown circumstances.
26	Ceno Kryeziu		Minister of Albania in Prague	14 October 1927	Alqiviadh Bebi	Prague, Czechoslovakia	Killed for having collaborated with the Yugoslavs. The assassin was a close relative to Andon Beça, an ally of Shefqet Vërlaci.
27	Llesh Topallaj		Officer of the Republican Guard	21 February 1931	Ndok Gjeloshi, Azis Çami	Operngasse St., Vienna, Austria	The official motive that circulated in the media at the time was that the assailants were trying to assassinate Ahmet Zogu.
28	Mark Kapidani		Member of the Parliament	19 December 1932	Geg Marka Gega	Inside the Officers' Hall, near the Royal Palace, Tirana	The assassin was a former officer in the Army Reserve, once sentenced to 15 years imprisonment for his attempts to overthrow the government.
29	Bajazid Doda		Photographer, Personal Secretary of Baron Nopcsa	25 April 1933	Franz Nopcsa von Felső-Szilvás	Singerstrasse St., Vienna, Austria	Killed for personal reasons.
30	Hasan Prishtina		Former Prime Minister	13 August 1933	Ibrahim Çelo	Thessaloniki, Greece	The assassin was apparently a former acquaintance but motives of the assassination remain unclear.
31	Leon De Ghilardi		Officer of the Austro-Hungarian Army	16 August 1933	Xhevahir Arapi	Mulliri i Kashtës, Fier	Killed during the anti-government revolt.
32	Qazim Bodinaku		Served as Prefect of Vlorë and later Berat	6 April 1939	Unknown	Unknown	A Zog loyalist, he was murdered as he was trying to leave the country by 2 persons whom he had had a previous dispute with.
33	Daut Hoxha		Commander of the Chameria Band	14 June 1940	Sotir Demiri, Vangjel Pando, Dhimo Koçi, Kolo Sulioti, Sotir Vangjeli	Sheshi i Rrahut, Konispol	The victim had been sentenced to death by the Greek State because of his anti-Greek resurgence in the region.
34	Xhafer Ypi		Former Prime Minister	17 December 1940	Unknown	Unknown	Killed during aerial bombardments.
35	Sali Nijazi Dede		Dedebaba, Founder of the Bektashi Order	28 November 1941	Italian agents	Bektashi Headquarters, Tirana	Did not accept to sign the act of invasion by Fascist Italy.
36	Musa Puka		Prefect of Elbasan	2 October 1942	Unknown	Elbasan	Killed on a roadside by communist rebels.
37	Skënder Çami		Police Superintendent for Korçë	4 March 1942	Unknown	Unknown	The motives of the killing remain unknown.
38	Qemal Stafa		Leader of the Communist Youth	5 May 1942	A local policeman	Tirana	Stafa was killed in a house on the outskirts of Tirana by a local Carabinieri. Rumors say that he may have been betrayed by one or more of his comrades, possibly Enver Hoxha (the first secretary of the Albanian communist party & leader of Albania), because he gained much from his death.
39	Saverino Ricottini		Member of the Fascist Upper Council	25 March 1943	Unknown	Peja, Kosovo	The motives of the murder are unknown.
40	Qazim Koculi		Served as Acting Prime Minister	2 January 1943	Halil Alia	Vlorë	Murdered by the fascist mercenary battalion of Halil Alia for personal reasons.
41	Iljas Agushi		Deputy Prime Minister in the Merlika Cabinet	27 October 1943	Bujar Hoxha, Shahin Gjashta	Tirana	The motives of the assassination were due to Agushi's collaboration with the invading Nazi forces.
42	Hysen Myshketa		Member of the National Council	8 October 1943	Unknown	Durrës	Myshketa and his brother were murdered by three assassins as they were walking along the "Mussolini Boardwalk".
43	Idhomen Kosturi		Chairman of the National Council	5 November 1943	Kolë Laku	Tirana	Murdered under the orders of the Communist Guerrilla unit.
44	Aziz Çami		Military commander in the Vlora War	15 December 1943	Communist forces	Tirana	Murdered for being a member of the Balli Kombëtar.
45	Veli Vasjari		Chief of State Police	12 May 1944	Unknown	Korçë	Killed by communist partisans near the region of Gabravicë.
46	Mustafa Gjinishi		Board member of the National Liberation Council	26 August 1944	Unknown	Sllatinë, Dibër	His death occurred during mysterious circumstances as he traveled to northern Albania.
47	Lefter Kosova		Minister of Public Works under the Biçakçiu Cabinet	6 September 1944	Xhelal Staravecka	Tirana	Murdered because of a previous political dispute.
48	Mark Kodheli		Consul of Albania in Bari, Italy	1944	Unknown		
49	Shaban Polluzha		Member of the Yugoslavian Parliament	21 February 1945	Yugoslavian soldiers	Tërstenik, Drenicë, Kosovo	He was killed for being an irredentist.
50	Miladin Popović		Head of the Communist Yugoslav Mission in Albania	13 March 1945	Haki Taha	Pristina, Kosovo	Popović mediated plans of keeping the territory of Kosovo under Serbian supervision.
51	Ndrecë Ndue Gjoka		Deputy chairman of the executive committee of Mirditë	17 February 1946	Members of the Mountains Committee	Qafë-Vorrëz, Kaçinar, Mirditë	Killed for spreading educational leaflets.
52	Mark Gjon Marku		Minister of Interior in the Bushati Cabinet	14 June 1946	Members of Armed Forces	Perlat Forest, Prosek, Mirditë	Killed for personal reasons.
53	Baba Faja Martaneshi		Deputy Leader of the National Liberation Front	18 March 1947	Dede Baba Abazi	Bektashi Headquarters, Tirana	Murdered due to political and religious differences.
54	Kostaq Kotta		Prime Minister	1 September 1947	Two prison guards	Burrel Prison	Murdered because he was considered a political enemy.
55	Nako Spiru		High ranking communist official in charge of the State Planning Commission	20 November 1947	Unknown	Tirana	The murder was officially ruled a suicide but he was most likely killed under the orders of Koçi Xoxe.
56	Josif Papamihali		Mission head of the Unity Church of Albania	26 October 1948	Labor camp guards	Maliq	He was considered an enemy of the state along with thirty-seven other priests.
57	Bardhok Biba		Member of the People's Assembly	9 August 1949	Unknown	Kaçinar, Lezhë	Killed by the anti-communist resistance guerrilla unit "Komiteti i Maleve".
58	Pal Mëlyshi		Agent of the Sigurimi	12 April 1950	Unknown	Ujë-Lurth, Mirditë	His suspicious death was considered accidental.
59	Alush Lleshanaku		Legislative Member of the Corporative Fascist Upper Council	24 December 1950	Ilo Stojko	Elbasan	A staunch anti-communist resistance leader, Lleshanaku was assassinated by an agent of the Sigurimi.
60	Sali Ormeni		Director of the Albanian State Police	2 March 1951	Unknown	Rrogozhinë	Killed mysteriously a week after the bombing of the Soviet Embassy.
61	Omer Nishani		Former Head of State	26 May 1954	Unknown	Tirana	His murder was officially ruled a suicide.
62	Teme Sejko		Commander of the Naval Fleet	31 May 1961	Qemal Birçe, Islam Gjondede	Maminas, Durrës	The perpetrators tied a rope around his neck and killed him for personal reasons.
63	Haxhi Hajdari		Member of the People's Assembly	8 April 1963	Unknown	Unknown	Denounced as the "People's Enemy" by the regime, he was killed by artillery gunfire.
64	Myslym Keta		Commander of the Tanks Regiment	26 February 1966	Unknown	Fushë-Arrëz	Keta was suspected to be an opponent of dictator Enver Hoxha.
65	Mehmet Shehu		Prime Minister	17 December 1981	Unknown	Tirana	The official death was ruled a suicide but Shehu was more than likely killed by the Sigurimi under Hoxha's orders.
66	Jusuf Gërvalla		Member of the Movement for Liberation of Kosovo	17 January 1982	Agents of the UDB	Stuttgart, Federal Republic of Germany	To suppress the Albanian nationalist movement in Kosovo.
67	Mustafa Band		Exiles	27 September 1982	Security Forces	Zhamë, Rrogozhinë	Prevented plot to assassinate dictator Enver Hoxha.
68	Jean Marie Massellin		French Employee Club Med Corfu	18 Jun 1984	Albanian Border Guards	Vrine, Butrinti	Killed by Albanian border guards for accidentally straying in Albanian territorial waters.
69	Aleksandër Kondo		National Weightlifting Champion	1 May 1987	Unknown	Gas station, New York	Likely assassination by Sigurimi agents to make it appear as an accident.
70	Josif Budo		Local worker	10 July 1990	Luan Allajbeu	Main street, Kavajë	Killed for being an opponent of the regime.
71	Artan Lenja		Wrestler	24 February 1991	Military patrol	Rruga "Ndre Mjeda", Tirana	Killed by a military patrol unit in charge of enforcing public order.
72	Arben Broci		Engineer at a cigarette factory	2 April 1991	Unknown	Shkodër	Killed by a sniper to suppress public disorder.
73	Gazmend Muça		Criminal	7 April 1992	Naim Zyberi, Franc Konomi	Xhamlliku, Tirana	Killed for personal reasons.
74	Remzi Hoxha		Businessman	21 October 1995	Responsible: Arben Sefgjini, Ilir Kumbaro, Avni Koldashi, Budion Meçe	Kunë-Vain, Lezhë	The speculative rumor was that Hoxha was a former UDB agent. He died from the injuries sustained during his torture inside the SHIK facility.
75	Bujar Kaloshi		General Director of Prisons	26 July 1996	Unknown	Former aviation field, Tirana	Kaloshi's murder was likely influenced by his position as head of the prison system.
76	Ahmet Krasniqi		Kosovo's Minister of Defence	21 September 1998	Unknown	"Haxhi Dalliu" street, Tirana	The motives for his killing are not yet known.
77	Azem Hajdari		Member of the Assembly	22 September 1998	Fatmir Haklaj, Jaho Mulosmani, Naim Cangu	Tirana	The suspected motive for Hajdari's assassination was political revenge.
78	Kleanthi Koçi		Chief Justice of the Supreme Court	21 February 1999	Unknown	Near Tirana International Hotel	Motives for his killing have yet to be uncovered.
79	Arben Zylyftari		Police chief in Shkodër	2 August 2000	Bahri Tafili	Lagja "Udhakryq", Shkodër	Killed due to his position as chief of police.
80	Salih Tivari		General Secretary of the Muslim Community of Albania	13 January 2002	Unknown	Headquarters of the Muslim Community of Albania	Tivari had raised doubts about financial contributions coming from anonymous Muslim organizations.
81	Gani Malushi		Chief of Police in Fushë-Krujë	6 August 2003	Agim Pepa	Durrës	The actual target in the killing was Malushi's personal chauffeur.
82	Gramoz Palushi		Football fan	4 September 2004	Panajotis Kladhis	Island of Zakinthos, Greece	Killed because he celebrated the football victory of Albania over Greece.
83	Vajdin Lame		Businessman	28 February 2005	Unknown	Tirana	Lame was part owner of national television station Top Channel. He was killed from a bomb planted inside an elevator alongside his friend Artan Arsi.
84	Edmond Malollari		President of Tomori Berat football club	14 December 2005	Unknown	Tirana	The motive for the killing in broad daylight was likely because of unpaid debt.
85	Fatmir Xhindi		Member of the Assembly	2 May 2009	Unknown	Roskovec, Fier	Motives of his murder remain a mystery.
86	Fatos Xhani, Altin Dizdari, Sajmir Duçkallari, Kastriot Feskaj		State Police officers	7 August 2009	Dritan Dajti	Iliria beach, Durrës	The officers on duty were killed as Dajti was resisting arrest.
87	Remzi Veseli		Mayor of Tërthore Commune	25 October 2010	Unknown	Kukës	Motives for the killing remain unsolved.
88	Hekuran Deda, Faik Myrtaj, Ziver Veizi, Aleks Nika		Participants in an anti-government protest	21 January 2011	Ndrea Prendi, Agim Llupo	"Dëshmorët e Kombit" Boulevard, Tirana	Randomly killed to warn protesters from entering the Prime Minister's Office building.
89	Skerdilajd Konomi		Judge of the 1st Circuit Court in Vlorë	9 September 2011	Unknown	"Vlorë-Skelë" street, Vlorë	Motives for the killing have yet to be uncovered.
90	Arjan Selimi		Drug trafficker	26 September 2011	Unknown	Tirana	Selimi was the fiancé of television personality Inis Gjoni. His killing was a result of his past as a convicted drug trafficker.
91	Adem Tahiraj		Chief of Police in Shijak	12 September 2012	Ilir Xhakja	Katund-Sukth, Durrës	Shot and killed during an operation for the arrest of the suspect.
92	Dritan Lamaj		Chief of Commissariat No. 6 in Tirana	25 February 2013	Arben Frroku	Tirana	Frroku, a local businessman, had been physically assaulted by Lamaj a few months prior.
93	Artan Santo		Founder of Credins Bank	26 June 2014	Unknown	"Ibrahim Rugova" street, Tirana	Motives for his murder remain a mystery.
94	Ibrahim Basha		Officer of RENEA	24 June 2015	Unknown	Lazarat, Gjirokastër	Killed by sniper fire during a drug sting operation.
95	Artan Cuku		Police chief of Vlorë	8 April 2017	Mikel Shallari	Rruga e Kosovarëve, Tirana	Killed for work related revenge.

== Austria ==
Date	Victim(s)	Assassin(s)	Notes
11 February 1913	Franz Schuhmeier socialist member of the Reichsrat	Paul Kunschak	
21 October 1916	Count Karl von Stürgkh, Minister-President of Austria	Friedrich Adler	Assassinated by Social Democratic politician in protest of World War I
10 March 1925	Hugo Bettauer, journalist and writer, critic of antisemitism	Otto Rothstock, Austrian Nazi Party member	
25 July 1934	Engelbert Dollfuss, Chancellor of Austria	Paul Hudl, Otto Planetta and other Austrian Nazis	Part of a failed coup d'état, the July Putsch.
22 June 1936	Moritz Schlick, German philosopher	Johann Nelböck, student	Shot at the University of Vienna
22 October 1975	Daniş Tunalıgil, Turkish ambassador	Justice Commandos of the Armenian Genocide	
1 May 1981	Heinz Nittel, Austrian politician and president of the Austrian-Israel Society	Abu Nidal Organization	
19 May 1987	Hamid Reza Chitgar, exiled Iranian politician	Agents of the Ministry of Intelligence of the Islamic Republic of Iran	
13 July 1989	Abdul Rahman Ghassemlou, dissident Kurdish Iranian political leader	Intelligence operatives of the Iranian Ministry of Intelligence led by Mohammad Jafar Sahraroudi	Killed in Vienna during negotiations
13 January 2009	Umar Israilov, Former bodyguard of Chechen President Ramzan Kadyrov	Chechen criminal group, ordered by Ramzan Kadyrov	

== Belarus ==
Date	Victim(s)	Assassin(s)	Notes
22 September 1943	Wilhelm Kube, German Nazi Generalkommissar for Weissruthenien (Belarus)	Yelena Mazanik, a Soviet partisan	Killed in Minsk during the Second World War
13 January 1948	Solomon Mikhoels, Chairman of the Jewish Anti-Fascist Committee	Police officers, led by Sergei Ogoltsov	Ordered by Joseph Stalin

== Belgium ==
Date	Victim(s)	Assassin(s)	Notes
2 March 1127	Charles I, Count of Flanders		Hacked to death by knights with broadswoards in St. Donatian's Cathedral
18 August 1950	Julien Lahaut, chairman of the Communist Party of Belgium	Belgian royalists	Shot in his home town of Seraing.
23 May 1971	Maximiliano Gómez, Dominican communist leader		Poisoned by his lover in Brussels.
22 May 1990	Gerald Bull, Canadian developer of the Martlet cannon		Shot outside his apartment in Brussels. Believed to have been assassinated by Mossad for his work on the Project Babylon "supergun" in Ba'athist Iraq
18 July 1991	André Cools, former president of the Walloon Council, former chairman of the Socialist Party and minister of state	Richard Taxquet and Giuseppe "Pino" di Mauro	Killed in Liège.
4 December 1993	Jusuf Prazina, Bosnian organized crime figure and warlord during the Bosnian War	Suspected to be Bosnian Croat extremists	Last seen the night of 3 December with two bodyguards in Liège after a game of cards. Prazina's body was discovered in a canal alongside a highway near the German border in Eupen by two Romanian hitch-hikers on New Year's Eve.

== Bosnia and Herzegovina ==
Date	Victim(s)	Assassin(s)	Notes
24 August 1415	Pavle Radinović, nobleman	Sandalj Hranić, Vukmir Zlatonosović and his men	
28 June 1914	Archduke Franz Ferdinand and his wife Sophie	Gavrilo Princip	Assassinated by the Serbian nationalist organization the Black Hand in Sarajevo. This assassination played a role in starting World War I
8 January 1993	Hakija Turajlić, deputy prime minister	Army of Republika Srpska	Killed at a roadblock while under UNPROFOR escort during the Bosnian War

== Bulgaria ==
Date	Victim(s)	Assassin(s)	Notes
1196	Ivan Asen I, Tsar of Bulgaria	Ivanko	
15 July 1895	Stefan Stambolov, former prime minister of Bulgaria	IMRO	Died in Sofia after being stabbed.
11 March 1907	Dimitar Petkov, Prime Minister of Bulgaria		Killed in Sofia by an anarchist.
25 February 1916	Naum Tyufekchiev, IMRO member	Todor Aleksandrov (IMRO)	He was assassinated by Todor Aleksandrov, the leader of the Internal Macedonian Revolutionary Organization as part of factional warfare within the organization
14 June 1923	Aleksandar Stamboliyski, Prime Minister of Bulgaria	IMRO activists	Killed in his home town of Slavovitsa during the 9 June coup d'état
31 August 1924	Todor Aleksandrov, IMRO member and leader	IMRO voivodes Shteryu Vlahov and Dincho Vretenarov	Assassinated in unclear circumstances in the Pirin Mountains
15 April 1925	Konstantin Georgiev	Atanas Todovichin	Georgiev was chosen as a high-profile target whose funeral would draw Bulgaria’s political and military elite
16 April 1925	Stefan Nerezov, former Chief of the General Staff		Was among 150 killed in the Saint Nedelya Church bombing
7 July 1928	Aleksandar Protogerov, member of SMAC and the IMRO.	IMRO	Aassassinated on the orders of Ivan Mihailov
13 February 1943	Hristo Lukov, military officer, former Minister of War and leader of the far-right Union of Bulgarian National Legions	Violeta Yakova	Killed by the Bulgarian Resistance in Sofia.
25 April 1995	Vasil Iliev, insurance boss and owner of "VIS-2", former wrestler		Shot while being driven in Sofia.
2 October 1996	Andrey Lukanov, former prime minister of Bulgaria		Shot outside his apartment in Sofia.
7 March 2003	Iliya Pavlov, president of Multigroup corporation and the wealthiest man in Bulgaria, former wrestler		Shot outside his office in Sofia.
25 August 2005	Georgi Iliev, football club owner, brother of the assassinated Vasil Iliev		Shot in a restaurant in Sunny Beach.
26 October 2005	Emil Kyulev, banker, ex-professional swimmer, voted Mr. Economics in Bulgaria for 2002		Shot while driving along Bulgaria Boulevard, Sofia.
6 April 2008	Borislav Georgiev, CEO of "Atomenergoremont" nuclear plant repair company		
7 April 2008	Georgi Stoev, writer and former Bulgarian mafia mobster		Assassinated in what is believed to be a mafia hit in the street in Sofia.

== Croatia ==
Date	Victim(s)	Assassin(s)	Notes
9 May 480	Julius Nepos, Roman emperor		Assassinated near Salona (modern Solin).
19 February 1931	Milan Šufflay, nationalist writer	Branko Zwerger, alongside other members of Young Yugoslavia (The Kingdom of Yugoslavia's official youth organization).	Bludgeoned with an iron rod.
14 July 1933	Josip Predavec, politician and vice-president of the Croatian Peasant Party		
21 September 1991	Ante Paradžik, politician and founder of the Croatian Party of Rights		
23 October 2008	Ivo Pukanić, editor-in-chief of Nacional magazine	Croatian mafia	Killed by a car bomb alongside Niko Franjić.

== Cyprus ==
Date	Victim(s)	Assassin(s)	Notes
15 March 1970	Polykarpos Giorkatzis, government minister		Shot in Mia Milia.
19 August 1974	Rodger Paul Davies, United States Ambassador to Cyprus		Killed by EOKA B sniper fire during an anti-American demonstration in Nicosia denouncing the Turkish invasion of Cyprus.

== Czech Republic ==
Date	Victim(s)	Assassin(s)	Notes
15 September 921	Saint Ludmila, wife of Duke Bořivoj, grandmother of Duke Václav I	Tunna and Gomon	Strangled by Viking warriors hired by Ludmila's daughter-in-law Drahomíra I.
28 September 935	Wenceslaus I, Duke of Bohemia (Saint Wenceslaus)	Noblemen affiliated with Boleslaus I	Stabbed to death in Stará Boleslav.
4 August 1306	Wenceslaus III, King of Bohemia		Killed in Olomouc.
25 February 1634	Albrecht von Wallenstein, Bohemian Generalissimo during the Thirty Years' War	Walter Devereux	Stabbed to death in Cheb.
5 January 1923	Alois Rašín, Finance Minister of Czechoslovakia	Josef Šoupal	Shot in Prague.
26 August 1923	Rayko Daskalov, Bulgarian politician and former cabinet minister	Yordan Tsitsonkov	Shot by the Internal Macedonian Revolutionary Organization in Prague
14 October 1927	Ceno Kryeziu, Albanian ambassador to Czechoslovakia	Alqiviadh Bebi	Shot in Prague.
27 May 1942	Reinhard Heydrich, General in the Nazi German Schutzstaffel, major organizer of the Holocaust and governor of the Protectorate of Bohemia and Moravia	Jan Kubiš, Jozef Gabčík	Died after being wounded by a bomb thrown at him as he was being driven through Libeň near Prague, as part of Operation Anthropoid organized by the Czechoslovak government-in-exile and the British Special Operations Executive. The Lidice Massacre followed as retribution by the Nazis. A legend has it that he deliberately put the Crown of Bohemia on his head beforehand, meaning an untimely death.
25 January 2006	František Mrázek, controversial entrepreneur		Shot in the heart by a sniper

== Denmark ==
Date	Victim(s)	Assassin(s)	Notes
970	Harald Greycloak, King of Denmark	Haakon Sigurdsson	Killed in retaliation for the death of Sigurd Haakonsson in Hals in the Limfjord.
10 July 1086	Canute IV, King of Denmark		Killed in a peasant revolt
22 November 1286	Erik V Klipping, King of Denmark		Killed in a conspiracy by members of the nobility

== Estonia ==
Date	Victim(s)	Assassin(s)	Notes
16 August 1924	Jaak Nanilson, member of the Riigikogu	Unknown (suspects were acquitted due to lack of evidence)	The assassination was endorsed by local pro-communist MPs and in the Soviet media
1 December 1924	Karl Kark, Minister of Transportation		Shot by communist insurgents during the 1924 Estonian coup d'état attempt.
4 April 1930	Johan Unt, military major-general	Unknown	

== Finland ==
Date	Victim(s)	Assassin(s)	Notes
16 June 1904	Nikolai Ivanovich Bobrikov, Governor-General of Finland	Eugen Schauman	Killed by a Finnish nationalist for implementing Russification in Finland. Happens on day described in James Joyce's novel Ulysses, is briefly mentioned in the book.
6 February 1905	Eliel Soisalon-Soininen, Chancellor of Justice	Lennart Hohenthal	Shot in his apartment in Helsinki.
2 October 1911	Valde Hirvikanta, President of the Turku Court of Appeal	Bruno Forsström	Shot for unclear reasons while leaving his home; Forsström immediately committed suicide afterward.
14 February 1922	Heikki Ritavuori, Minister of the Interior	Ernst Tandefelt	Shot at his home in Helsinki.

== France ==
Date	Victim(s)	Assassin(s)	Notes
8 January 1354	Charles d'Espagne, constable of France	Jean de Soult	
31 July 1358	Étienne Marcel, Parisian merchant		
23 November 1407	Louis of Valois, Duke of Orléans		Killed on the orders of John the Fearless
10 September 1419	John the Fearless, Duke of Burgundy	Tanneguy du Chastel and Jean Louvet	Killed during a parley with the Dauphin (the future Charles VII of France)
24 August 1572	Gaspard de Coligny	Besme	Killed during the St. Bartholomew's Day massacre
1 August 1589	Henri III, King of France	Jacques Clément	Killed due to religious-political antagonism.
14 May 1610	Henri IV, King of France	François Ravaillac	Killed due to religious-political antagonism.
24 April 1617	Concino Concini, chief minister to King Louis XIII		
14 July 1789	Jacques de Flesselles, Provost of Paris		Shot outside the Paris City Hall after being surrounded by an armed mob.
13 July 1793	Jean-Paul Marat, revolutionary	Charlotte Corday	Stabbed in his bathtub.
2 August 1815	Guillaume Brune, Marsal of France under Napoleon		shot in his hotel by a royalist mob after Napoleon's defeat at Waterloo
13 February 1820	Charles Ferdinand, Duke of Berry, younger son of the future King Charles X	Louis Pierre Louvel	Killed by a Bonapartist while at the Théâtre National
24 June 1894	Sadi Carnot, President of France	Sante Geronimo Caserio, anarchist	Stabbed to death after a speech in Lyon during the Ère des attentats.
29 September 1902	Emile Zola, novelist and journalist		Possibly killed in relation to the Dreyfus Affair and his publishing of his letter J'Accuse…!
16 March 1914	Gaston Calmette, journalist and editor of Le Figaro	Henriette Caillaux	Killed in the offices of Le Figaro by the wife of former prime minister Joseph Caillaux due to the paper's negative coverage of her husband.
31 July 1914	Jean Jaurès, Socialist politician and pacifist	Raoul Villain	Killed in Paris. The assassin was tried and acquitted in 1919.
13 June 1920	Essad Toptani, former Prime Minister of Albania	Avni Rustemi	
25 May 1926	Symon Petlyura, exiled President of Ukraine	Sholom Schwartzbard	Killed in Paris. The jury acquitted the murderer.
7 December 1930	Noe Ramishvili, former Prime Minister of Georgia	OGPU agents	Killed in Paris
6 May 1932	Paul Doumer, President of France	Paul Gorguloff	Shot by a Russian emigre at a book fair at the Hôtel Salomon de Rothschild in Paris.
9 October 1934	Alexander I of Yugoslavia, king of Yugoslavia	Vlado Chernozemski, member of the IMRO	Killed in Marseille during a state visit. The assassination was planned by the Ustaše.
7 November 1938	Ernst vom Rath, German diplomat	Herschel Grynszpan	Killed in Paris. His murder was used as an excuse by the Nazis to commit the Kristallnacht in Germany
26 July 1941	Marx Dormoy, socialist and former Interior Minister of France		Killed by a bomb believed to have been placed by the far-right organization La Cagoule
17 January 1944	Eugène Deloncle, milicien and former leader of clandestine far-right organisation La Cagoule		Killed by the SD
23 March 1944	Constant Chevillon, head of FUDOFSI		Killed by the Gestapo in Lyon
28 June 1944	Philippe Henriot, State secretary for Information and Propaganda of Vichy France		Killed by French resistants in Paris
7 July 1944	Georges Mandel, former radical-socialist Interior Minister and French resistant		Killed by miliciens in the forest of Fontainebleau
31 March 1961	Camille Blanc, Mayor of Évian-les-Bains	Organisation armée secrète	Killed for hosting negotiations between the French government and the FLN
31 May 1961	Roger Gavoury, Divisional Commissaire of the French National Police and Central Commissaire of Algiers,	two members of the OAS, Claude Piegts and Albert Dovecar	Gavoury was killed for investigating the OAS
29 October 1965	Mehdi Ben Barka, Moroccan socialist leader and Third-World Tricontinental leader		Disappeared in Paris
8 December 1972	Mahmoud Hamshari, Palestine Liberation Organization (PLO) representative in Paris	Mossad, Israeli Secret Service	Killed in his apartment by a bomb planted in his telephone as he answered a call in retribution for Munich Massacre at the 1972 Summer Olympics, the second of a number of attacks pursuant to Mossad assassinations following the Munich massacre.
26 August 1973	Outel Bono, Chadian medical doctor and critic of Chadian president François Tombalbaye		Shot while climbing into his car in Paris.
6 April 1973	Basil al-Kubaissi, professor and member of the Popular Front for the Liberation of Palestine	Mossad	Shot dead
28 June 1973	Mohammad Boudia, Algerian-born director of operations for Black September in France	Mossad	Killed in Paris by a pressure-activated bomb packed with heavy nuts and bolts placed under his car seat as part of Mossad assassinations following the Munich massacre.
24 October 1975	İsmail Erez, Turkish ambassador to France	Armenian Secret Army for the Liberation of Armenia	
14 July 1976	Joachim Peiper, SS officer and war criminal		Killed in an arson attack on his home by a communist group dubbing themselves "The Avengers" in Traves, Haute-Saône after he had been discovered living under a false identity.
24 December 1976	Jean de Broglie, former minister and one of the French negotiators of the Évian Accords		
18 March 1978	François Duprat, neo-fascist writer	Jewish Remembrance commando	
4 May 1978	Henri Curiel, Egyptian-born anticolonialist activist		Shot in Paris
3 August 1978	Ezzedin Kalak, chief of the PLO's Paris bureau		Killed in his Paris office alongside his deputy Hamad Adnan in the Arab League building
16 October 1978	Bruno Bušić, dissident Croatian/Yugoslav writer	Yugoslav secret police	
21 December 1978	José Miguel Beñaran Ordeñana "Argala", Basque leader		Killed by a bomb in Anglet, allegedly planted by the Batallón Vasco Español.
25 July 1979	Zuhair Muhsin, leader of the As-Sa'iqa faction within the PLO		
20 September 1979	Pierre Goldman, left-wing activist		Shot in Paris
30 October 1979	Robert Boulin, Minister of Labor	Unknown	Officially suicide, but a lot of anomalies revealed since.
7 December 1979	Shahriar Shafiq, Imperial Iranian Navy Captain		Shot on the Rue Pergolese in Paris
1 February 1980	Joseph Fontanet, former Education Minister	Unknown	Killed in Paris.
14 June 1980	Yehia El-Mashad, Egyptian atomic scientist		Shot at the Le Méridien hotel in Paris.
21 July 1980	Salah al-Din Bitar, exiled former Prime Minister of Syria		Killed in Paris.
18 January 1982	Charles R. Ray, US army Colonel and assistant military attaché	Lebanese Armed Revolutionary Faction	Shot and killed outside his Paris apartment. Georges Ibrahim Abdallah was convicted for complicity in the assassination but the shooter was never convicted.
31 March 1982	Yacov Barsimantov, Israeli diplomat, Mossad agent	Jacqueline Esber a.k.a. Rima, member of the Lebanese Armed Revolutionary Factions	Shot in the lobby of his home
13 June 1982	Jean-Pierre Maïone-Libaude, right-wing activist and criminal		Shot at Argent-sur-Sauldre soon after being released from prison.
23 July 1982	Fadl Dani, deputy director of the PLO office in Paris	Mossad	Killed in Paris by a car bomb as part of Mossad assassinations following the Munich massacre.
25 January 1985	René Audran, senior official of the Ministry of Defence	Action directe	Shot in Paris
17 November 1986	Georges Besse, Renault executive	Action Directe	Shot while emerging from his car in Paris by far-left activists of Action directe
29 March 1988	Dulcie September, African National Congress representative		Killed in Paris
19 July 1990	Joseph Doucé, activist for sexual minorities		Corpse found in Rambouillet forest; murder remains unsolved
6 August 1991	Shapour Bakhtiar, exiled former Prime Minister of Iran		Stabbed to death at his residence in Suresnes along with his secretary.
8 June 1992	Atef Bseiso, Palestine Liberation Organization head of intelligence	Mossad	Killed in Paris.
8 June 1993	René Bousquet, Secretary general of the Vichy police	Christian Didier	Shot and killed in his Paris apartment over his role in wartime deportations. Died a few weeks before his trial regarding said deportations.
11 July 1995	Abdelbaki Sahraoui, co-founder of the Algerian Islamic Salvation Front	Armed Islamic Group	Killed in Paris.
6 February 1998	Claude Érignac, prefect of Corsica	Yvan Colonna	Shot in Ajaccio by a Corsican nationalist.
9 January 2013	Sakine Cansız, Fidan Doğan and Leyla Söylemez, Kurdish nationalists		Shot at Rue La Fayette in Paris.
31 may 2014	Hélène Pastor	shoot by a gang that included her daughter's long term boyfriend	Nice, France
7 January 2015	Cabu, Elsa Cayat, Charb, Philippe Honoré, Bernard Maris, Mustapha Ourrad, Tignous and Georges Wolinski, cartoonists working for Charlie Hebdo	Chérif and Saïd Kouachi	See Charlie Hebdo shooting
26 July 2016	Jacques Hamel, Roman Catholic priest of Saint-Étienne-du-Rouvray	Adel Kermiche and Abdel Malik Petitjean	Stabbed to death during mass. See 2016 Normandy church attack.
16 October 2020	Samuel Paty, Secondary school teacher	Abdoullakh Anzorov	Killed and beheaded with a cleaver for having shown his students Charlie Hebdo's 2012 cartoons depicting the Islamic prophet Muhammad.
12 January 2026	Alain Orsoni, Corsican politician, founder and former leader the National Liberation Front of Corsica-Canal Abituale (FNLC-CA), and former president of AC Ajaccio		Shot while attending his mother's funeral with a single bullet fired from a long gun. Presumed to be a hit carried out by local organized crime. Pending investigation.

== Georgia ==
Date	Victim(s)	Assassin(s)	Notes
555	Gubazes II of Lazica, King of Lazica		Stabbed by two Byzantine generals
19 June 1920	Fatali Khan Khoyski, former prime minister of the Democratic Republic of Azerbaijan	Aram Yerganian	Killed by the Armenian Revolutionary Federation as part of Operation Nemesis due to his role in the Armenian genocide
21 July 1922	Djemal Pasha, former Ottoman Navy Minister	Dashnaks	Killed by the Armenian Revolutionary Federation as part of Operation Nemesis
3 December 1994	Giorgi Chanturia, opposition politician		Shot along with his wife by four gunmen in their car
20 May 2007	Guram Sharadze, historian and nationalist politician		Assassinated in Tbilisi

== Germany ==
Date	Victim(s)	Assassin(s)	Notes
March 235	Alexander Severus, Roman emperor		Killed near Moguntiacum (present-day Mainz) by his troops.
268	Postumus, Gallic emperor		Killed in Mainz
268	Laelianus, Gallic emperor		Killed in Mainz
23 April 997	Adalbert of Prague, Czech Bishop	Prussian heathen	Tortured to death near the Baltic Sea near present-day Elbląg, Poland
21 June 1208	Philipp von Hohenstaufen, Holy Roman Emperor	Count Otto VIII of Wittelsbach	Killed in Bamberg
7 November 1225	Engelbert I. von Köln, Archbishop of Cologne	Count Frederick of Isenberg	
30 July 1233	Konrad von Marburg, inquisitor		
23 March 1819	August von Kotzebue, dramatist	Karl Ludwig Sand	
German Reich (1871–1945)
15 January 1919	Rosa Luxemburg, socialist writer	Hermann Souchon (ordered by Waldemar Pabst)	Shot in Berlin in the wake of the Spartacist uprising
15 January 1919	Karl Liebknecht, socialist lawyer and politician	Horst von Pflugk-Harttung, Heinrich Stiege, Ulrich von Ritgen and Rudolf Liepmann (ordered by Waldemar Pabst)	Shot in Berlin in the wake of the Spartacist uprising
21 February 1919	Kurt Eisner, socialist Minister-President of Bavaria	Anton Graf von Arco auf Valley	Killed in Munich.
10 March 1919	Leo Jogiches, Marxist revolutionary	Ernst Tamschick, Detective Sergeant of the Prison Moabit	Shot in Berlin Prison Moabit
8 October 1919	Hugo Haase, socialist politician and leader of the Independent Social Democratic Party of Germany	Johann Voß	Died of sepsis from gunshot wounds
15 March 1921	Talaat Pasha, former Turkish Prime Minister and Minister of Interior Affairs	Soghomon Tehlirian	Killed in Berlin by Dashnak gunman in retaliation for his role in the Armenian Genocide as part of Operation Nemesis
26 August 1921	Matthias Erzberger, former Vice-Chancellor of Germany and Minister of Finance	Heinrich Tillessen and Heinrich Schulz (Members of Organisation Consul)	Shot at Bad Griesbach.
17 April 1922	Cemal Azmi, Turkish politician, governor of Trebizond vilayet and perpetrator of the Armenian genocide	Aram Yerganian and Arshavir Shirakian (Members of the Armenian Revolutionary Federation)	Killed as part of Operation Nemesis
17 April 1922	Bahattin Şakir, Turkish politician and architect of the Armenian genocide	Aram Yerganian and Arshavir Shirakian (Members of the Armenian Revolutionary Federation)	Killed as part of Operation Nemesis
24 June 1922	Walther Rathenau, Foreign Minister of Germany	Ernst Werner Techow, Erwin Kern and Hermann Fischer (Members of Organisation Consul)	Shot as he was being driven through Berlin by assassins in another car.
14 January 1930	Horst Wessel, Sturmführer of the SS in Berlin	Albrecht Höhler	Shot at point blank range in Karl-Marx-Allee, Berlin.
30 June 1934	Kurt von Schleicher, former Chancellor of Germany	SS officers (ordered by Adolf Hitler)	Murdered at Babelsberg by the SS during the Night of the Long Knives along with his wife, Elisabeth
30 June 1934	Gregor Strasser, politician and former Nazi Party member	SS officers	Killed in a prison cell in Berlin during the Night of the Long Knives
30 June 1934	Erich Klausener, Catholic politician	Kurt Gildisch, SS officer	Shot at his office in Berlin during the Night of the Long Knives
1 July 1934	Ernst Röhm, leader of the Sturmabteilung (SA)	Michael Lippert, SS officer	Shot in Stadelheim Prison by SS officers during the Night of the Long Knives.
14 October 1944	Erwin Rommel, German field marshal		Forced to commit suicide after he was implicated in the 20 July plot to assassinate Hitler.
25 March 1945	Franz Oppenhoff, lawyer and appointed pro-Allied mayor of Aachen	SS officers (ordered by Heinrich Himmler)	Killed by an assassination unit composed of four SS men and two members of the Hitler Youth.
Federal Republic of Germany (1949–present)
22 November 1954	Abdurrahman Fatalibeyli, Soviet Army defector and chief of the Azerbaijani desk for Radio Liberty		
12 October 1957	Lev Rebet, exiled Ukrainian nationalist leader	Bohdan Stashynsky, a KGB agent	Poisoned by cyanide gas in Munich.
15 October 1959	Stepan Bandera, exiled Ukrainian nationalist leader	Bohdan Stashynsky, a KGB agent	Poisoned by cyanide gas in Munich.
12 August 1961	Salah Ben Youssef, Tunisian politician		Shot in a hotel in Frankfurt.
18 October 1970	Krim Belkacem, exiled former Vice President of Algeria		Shot in a hotel in Frankfurt.
1 April 1971	Roberto Quintanilla, Bolivian consul-general in Hamburg, and former Head of Intelligence in the Bolivian Interior Ministry	Monika Ertl	Shot and killed by Ertl three times in the chest in his office. Killed in retaliation for his involvement in the capture and subsequent execution of Argentine revolutionary Che Guevara in 1967, and for the murder of Ertl's lover and National Liberation Army of Bolivia leader Guido "Inti" Peredo in 1969. Ertl would later be ambushed and killed in retaliation by Bolivian security forces in 1973.
10 November 1974	Günter von Dreekmann, president of the Berlin District court	2 June Movement	Killed during attempted kidnapping
7 April 1977	Siegfried Buback, Public Prosecutor General of West Germany	Red Army Faction members	Shot while driving his car near Karlsruhe.
30 July 1977	Jürgen Ponto, CEO of Dresdner Bank	Red Army Faction members	Killed in Frankfurt.
18 October 1977	Hanns-Martin Schleyer, president of the German employers' organization	Red Army Faction members	Kidnapped and later killed.
17 January 1982	Jusuf Gërvalla, Member of the Movement for Liberation of Kosovo	Red Army Faction members	Killed by Yugoslav Secret Police in Stuttgart
9 July 1986	Karl Heinz Beckurts, physicist and research manager.	Red Army Faction members	Killed by a bomb near Strasslach in Munich.
October 10, 1986	Gerold von Braunmühl, West German Diplomat	Red Army Faction members	Shot and killed outside his residece in Bonn.
30 November 1989	Alfred Herrhausen, Deutsche Bank CEO	Red Army Faction members	Killed by a bicycle bomb as his car passed by in Bad Homburg.
1 April 1991	Detlev Karsten Rohwedder, director of Treuhandanstalt for the former East Germany	Red Army Faction members	Killed in Düsseldorf.
7 August 1992	Fereydoun Farrokhzad, exiled Iranian cultural figure	Agents of the Ministry of Intelligence of the Islamic Republic of Iran	Believed to have been killed as part of the Chain murders of Iran
17 September 1992	Sadeq Sharafkandi, Fattah Abdoli, Homayoun Ardalan, Nouri Dehkordi, dissident Kurdish Iranian political leaders	Agents of the Ministry of Intelligence of the Islamic Republic of Iran	Killed in Berlin (see Mykonos restaurant assassinations).
2 June 2019	Walter Lübcke, CDU politician and president of the Regierungsbezirk of Kassel	Stephan Ernst	Shot outside his home in Istha by a neo-Nazi terrorist
23 August 2019	Zelimkhan Khangoshvili, exiled Chechen military commander	Vadim Krasikov	Shot by an agent of the GRU

== Greece ==
Date	Victim(s)	Assassin(s)	Notes
514 BC	Hipparchus (son of Peisistratos), tyrant of Athens	Harmodius and Aristogeiton	
461 BC	Ephialtes, leader of the radical democracy movement in Athens		
404 BC	Alcibiades, Athenian general and politician		
October 336 BC	Philip II of Macedon, king of Macedon	Pausanias of Orestis	Assassinated in the theatre of ancient Aegae (present-day Vergina).
314 BC	Alexander, regent of Macedonia	Alexion, a Siyconian	Killed in Sicyon.
September 281 BC	Seleucus I Nicator, founder of the Seleucid dynasty	Ptolemy Keraunos	Killed near Lysimachia.
252 BC	Abantidas, tyrant of Sicyon		
192 BC	Nabis, Tyrant of Sparta	Aetolian League	
27 September 1831	Ioannis Kapodistrias, first President of Greece	Konstantinos Mavromichalis and Georgios Mavromichalis	Killed outside Nafplio church in revenge for the imprisonment of the assassins' patriarch Petrobey Mavromichalis. Konstantinos was thrown over a cliff by the citizens of Nafplio while Georgios was executed by firing squad.
13 June 1905	Theodoros Deligiannis, Prime Minister of Greece	Antonios Gherakaris	Stabbed outside the Hellenic Parliament.
8 March 1907	Marinos Antypas, socialist politician		Killed at Pyrgetos in Thessaly.
22 March 1912	Andreas Kopasis, governor of Samos		
18 March 1913	George I of Greece, King of Greece	Alexandros Schinas	Shot while walking in Thessaloniki as part of a possible conspiracy.
27 August 1923	Enrico Tellini	Organized Greek band	Killed to prevent the defining of the new Greco-Albanian boundary in favor of Albania.
13 August 1933	Hasan Prishtina, former Prime Minister of Albania	Ibrahim Celo	killed in a Thessaloniki café on the orders of King Zog of Albania
May 1948	George Polk, American journalist critical of US aid to rightist Greek government		
22 May 1963	Grigoris Lambrakis, leader of the anti-fascist movement in Greece	Emannouel Emannouilides and Spyro Gotzamanis	Killed with a club in Thessaloniki.
23 December 1975	Richard Welch, CIA Station Chief		Shot as he was being driven through Athens.
15 November 1983	George Tsantes; U.S. military attaché in Athens & deputy chief of the Joint United States Military Aid Group to Greece	Revolutionary Organization 17 November	Killed in Athens.
28 April 1988	Hagop Hagopian, leader of the Armenian Secret Army for the Liberation of Armenia		Killed in Athens.
28 June 1988	William Nordeen, U.S. military attaché in Athens	Revolutionary Organization 17 November	Killed in Athens.
26 September 1989	Pavlos Bakoyannis, New Democracy parliamentarian	Revolutionary Organization 17 November	Shot outside his office in Athens.
8 January 1991	Nikos Temponeras, teacher and member of the Labour Anti-imperalistic Front	Giannis Kalampokas	Killed by local leader of the New Democracy party during the student protests of 1990–1991.
8 June 2000	Stephen Saunders, Brigadier and British military attaché in Athens	Revolutionary Organization 17 November	Killed by a motorcycle gunman as he was driving in Athens.
19 July 2010	Sokratis Giolias, investigative journalist		possibly by members of the Sect of Revolutionaries
18 September 2013	Pavlos "Killah P" Fyssas, musician	Giorgos Roupakias	Killed by Neo-Nazi organization Golden Dawn.
9 April 2021	Giorgos Karaivaz, investigative journalist		Possibly killed by an organised crime group.

== Hungary ==
Date	Victim(s)	Assassin(s)	Notes
904	Kurszán, Chieftain of Hungary	Forces of Louis the Child	
1044	Suspected conspirators against King Samuel Aba	Forces loyal to Samuel Aba	50 suspected lords arrested and executed
5 June 1044	Samuel Aba, King of Hungary		Fled after losing the Battle of Ménfő but was captured and assassinated
1209	Csépán Győr, Palatine of Hungary	Tiba Tomaj	
28 September 1213	Gertrude of Merania, queen consort	Group of Hungarian nobles led by Peter, son of Töre	Stabbed for her blatant favoritism towards her German kinsmen and courtiers
November 1272	Béla, Duke of Macsó	Henry Kőszegi	
10 July 1290	Ladislaus IV, King of Hungary	Three Cumans – Árbóc, Törtel and Kemence	
5 September 1311	Amadeus Aba, Oligarch	Residents of Košice	
January 1386	Elisabeth of Bosnia, Queen of Hungary	John Horvat	
7 February 1386	Charles III, King of Naples	Balazs Forgach, Elisabeth of Bosnia, Nador Garai	Charles (II of Hungary, III of Naples) deadly wounded and died some days later.
27 February 1397	Stephen II Lackfi, lord	Hermann I of Celje	Assassinated on the orders of the Holy Roman Emperor Sigismund
9 November 1456	Ulrich II, Count of Celje	Forces of Ladislaus Hunyadi	
12 August 1534	Imre Czibak, Bishop of Varad	Lodovico Gritti	
16 December 1551	George Martinuzzi, Governor of Transylvania	Marco Aurelio Ferrari	
27 October 1613	Gabriel Báthory, Prince of Transylvania	Hajduks	Killed after he was accused of planning to hand over Várad (now Oradea) to the Ottomans
July 1661	Ákos Barcsay, Prince of Transylvania	Janos Kemeny	
31 October 1918	István Tisza, Prime Minister of Hungary		Assassinated by soldiers

== Iceland ==
Date	Victim(s)	Assassin(s)	Notes
22 September 1241	Snorri Sturluson, historian and politician	Gissur Þorvaldsson	

== Ireland ==
Date	Victim(s)	Assassin(s)	Notes
25 July 1186	Hugh de Lacy, Lord of Meath	Gilla-Gan-Mathiar O'Maidhaigh	Durrow, County Offaly
1189	Conchobar Maenmaige Ua Conchobair, King of Connacht	Manus mac Flann Ua Finaghty, Aodh mac Brian, Muircheartach mac Cathal mac Dermot mac Tadhg, Giolla na Naomh Ua Mulvihill	Assassination instigated by Conchobar ua nDiarmata, a rival for the title of King of Connacht. The victim's son Cathal Carragh Ua Conchobair later killed Conchobar ua nDiarmata in revenge.
6 May 1882	Lord Frederick Charles Cavendish, Chief Secretary for Ireland	Irish National Invincibles	Stabbed to death in what became known as the Phoenix Park Murders
6 May 1882	Thomas Henry Burke, Under-Secretary for Ireland	Irish National Invincibles	Stabbed to death in what became known as the Phoenix Park Murders
20 March 1920	Tomás Mac Curtain, Lord Mayor of Cork	Auxiliaries and RIC men	Shot in his home by a group of masked men, likely members of the Royal Irish Constabulary.
21 November 1920	Cairo Gang	Irish Republican Army	12 British intelligence agents, assassinated on the morning of 21 November 1920 in coordinated attacks.
22 August 1922	Michael Collins, Chairman of the Provisional Government of the Irish Free State	Anti-Treaty IRA	Ambushed outside Cork
7 December 1922	Seán Hales, Pro-Treaty Sinn Féin Teachta Dála	Anti-Treaty IRA	Killed as he left Dáil Éireann; fellow TD Pádraic Ó Máille was injured in the same attack, which was in reprisal against executions of anti-Treaty prisoners
10 July 1927	Kevin O'Higgins, Minister of Home Affairs and Justice of the Irish Free State	Timothy Coughlin, Bill Gannon and Archie Doyle	Killed while on his way to Mass by three anti-Treaty members of the IRA.
14 February 1932	Patrick Reynolds, Cumann na nGaedheal TD	Joseph Leddy	Shot dead during the 1932 election campaign by an ex-RIC policeman who had a personal grudge against him.
24 March 1936	Henry Boyle Townshend Somerville, Vice Admiral in the Royal Navy	Anti-Treaty IRA	Assassinated for providing assistance to Royal Navy recruits.
21 July 1976	Christopher Ewart-Biggs, British ambassador to Ireland	IRA	Killed by a land mine
27 August 1979	Louis Mountbatten, 1st Earl Mountbatten of Burma, Royal Navy Admiral of the Fleet, last Viceroy of India	IRA	Killed by a bomb on board his boat along with three other people, including his grandson.
25 May 1991	Eddie Fullerton, Sinn Féin county councillor	Ulster Defence Association	Shot at his home in Buncrana
10 February 1994	Dominic McGlinchey, Irish National Liberation Army (INLA) leader		Shot 14 times while making a call in a phone box.
26 June 1996	Veronica Guerin, journalist	Irish mafia	Shot in a contract killing for her reporting on organized crime.

== Italy ==
Date	Victim(s)	Assassin(s)	Notes
748 BC	Titus Tatius, Sabine King		Killed in Rome.
579 BC	Lucius Tarquinius Priscus, Etruscan king of Rome		Killed in Rome by the sons of Ancus Marcius.
554 BC	Phalaris, tyrant of Agrigento	Killed in an uprising led by Telemachus (Acragas)	Killed in Sicily. Said to be burned in his own brazen bull.
534 BC	Servius Tullius, Etruscan king of Rome	Tarquin II	Killed in Rome.
439 BC	Spurius Maelius, wealthy Roman plebeian	Gaius Servilius Ahala	
354 BC	Dion of Syracuse, tyrant of Syracuse	Calippus of Syracuse	Killed in Sicily.
352 BC	Calippus of Syracuse, tyrant of Syracuse	revolting mercenaries led by Leptines II and Polyperchon	reputedly was stabbed to death with the same sword he assassinated Dion less than two years earlier.
133 BC	Tiberius Gracchus, Roman tribune		Killed in Rome by Roman senators.
91 BC	Marcus Livius Drusus, Roman tribune		Resulted in the Social War.
15 March 44 BC	Julius Caesar, Roman general and dictator	Marcus Junius Brutus, Gaius Cassius Longinus, and other members of the Roman Senate	Resulted in a series of civil wars and indirectly in the end of the Roman Republic.
7 December 43 BC	Cicero, Roman orator		Killed near Formiae under orders from Mark Antony and with the approval of the Second Triumvirate.
24 January 41	Caligula, Roman Emperor	Cassius Chaerea, Marcus Vinicius, Lucius Annius Vinicianus, members of the Praetorian Guard, and others	
13 October 54	Claudius, Roman Emperor	Uncertain, reputed to be Agrippina the Younger on behalf of Nero	Rumored to be killed by poison mushrooms supplied by Locusta.
9 June 62	Claudia Octavia, Roman Empress	Nero	Executed on the orders of Nero on the island of Pandateria off the coast of Italy in an attempt to quell the public outcry of their divorce.
15 January 69	Galba, Roman Emperor		Killed in Rome by the Praetorian Guard under orders from Otho.
20 December 69	Vitellius, Roman Emperor		Killed in Rome by the Flavian army.
18 September 96	Domitian, Roman Emperor	Stephanus, steward to Julia Flavia	Killed in Rome.
31 December 192	Commodus, Roman Emperor	Narcissus, wrestler	Killed in Rome.
28 March 193	Pertinax, Roman Emperor		Killed in Rome by the Praetorian Guard.
2 June 193	Didius Julianus, Roman Emperor		Killed in Rome by the Praetorian Guard.
26 December 212	Publius Septimius Geta, Roman Emperor		Killed in Rome by centurions under orders of Caracalla.
8 April 217	Caracalla, Roman Emperor	Martialis	Killed between Edessa and Carrhae (modern-day Sanli Urfa and Harran), possibly under orders of Macrinus.
13 March 222	Elagabalus, Roman Emperor		Killed in Rome by the Praetorian Guard under orders of Julia Maesa and Julia Mamaea.
June 238	Maximinus Thrax, Roman Emperor		Killed outside Aquileia by his troops.
July/August 238	Pupienus, Roman Emperor		Killed in Rome by the Praetorian Guard. See Year of the Six Emperors.
July/August 238	Balbinus, Roman Emperor	Praetorian Guard	Killed in Rome by the Praetorian Guard. See Year of the Six Emperors.
August 253	Volusianus, Roman Emperor		Killed near Interamna by his troops.
August 253	Trebonianus Gallus, Roman Emperor		Killed near Interamna by his troops.
November 275	Aurelian, Roman Emperor	Mucapor and members of the Praetorian Guard	Killed near Caenophrurium (modern-day Corlu).
September 276	Florianus, Roman Emperor		Killed near Tarsus.
16 December 882	Pope John VIII		
6 May 1052	Boniface III, Margrave of Tuscany		Killed during a hunting expedition.
18 September 1345	Andrew, Duke of Calabria		
16 May 1412	Gian Maria Visconti, Duke of Milan		
26 April 1478	Giuliano de' Medici, co-ruler of Florence	Francesco de' Pazzi and Bernardo Bandini	Stabbed 19 times in the Pazzi conspiracy. Lorenzo de' Medici was also attacked, but escaped with his life.
14 June 1497	Giovanni Borgia, Duke of Gandia, son of Pope Alexander VI		
6 January 1537	Alessandro de' Medici, Duke of Florence	Lorenzino de' Medici	
15 November 1848	Pellegrino Rossi, Papal States Minister of Justice		
29 July 1900	Umberto I, King of Italy	Gaetano Bresci	Shot four times with a revolver due to the royal decoration of general Fiorenzo Bava Beccaris, who ordered a bloody repression in Milan in 1898. Influenced Leon Czolgosz to kill United States President William McKinley in 1901.
6 December 1921	Said Halim Pasha, former Ottoman Prime Minister	Arshavir Shirakian	Killed in Rome due to his role in the Armenian genocide.
10 June 1924	Giacomo Matteotti, socialist politician	Blackshirts	Kidnapped and killed by Fascists after denouncing them for electoral fraud in the 1924 Italian general election.
2 March 1925	Luigj Gurakuqi, Albanian independence leader	Baltjon Stambolla	Killed in Bari.
21 February 1931	Llesh Topallaj, Albanian soldier	Ndok Gjeloshi, Azis Çami	The official motive that circulated in the media at the time was that the assailants were trying to assassinate Ahmet Zogu.
13 November 1943	Igino Ghisellini, Federal Secretary of the Republican Fascist Party of Ferrara	Attributed to members of the Gruppi di Azione Patriottica	Ambushed and killed with six gunshots along the road between Ferrara and Casumaro. His body was then left in Castello d'Argile, where he was found the next morning in a ditch along the road. His assassination became the catalyst for what became known as the Ferrara massacre.
18 December 1943	Aldo Resega, Federal Secretary of the Republican Fascist Party of Milan	Gruppi di Azione Patriottica	Ambushed and shot dead in front of his home by three GAP members in Milan. Eight anti-Fascists were executed in reprisal on the following day at the Arena Civica.
15 April 1944	Giovanni Gentile, pedagogue, philosopher, and author of The Doctrine of Fascism	Bruno Fanciullacci and Antonio Ignesti of Gruppi di Azione Patriottica	Approached by Fanciullacci and Ignesti at his parked car in Florence, hiding pistols behind a book, and shot with several bullets in the chest and heart. Fanciullacci was captured on 26 April, and executed on 17 July after attempting to escape custody.
27 October 1962	Enrico Mattei, head of the oil company Eni and supporter of Algerian independence		Died in a plane crash allegedly caused by a bomb near Bascapè in Lombardy.
14 March 1972	Giangiacomo Feltrinelli, publisher and partisan of leftist guerrilla movements		Died in a bomb attack, probably with the involvement of the Italian secret service.
17 May 1972	Luigi Calabresi, Italian police commissioner	Ovidio Bompressi	Shot twice in the back while walking to work. Bompressi killed Calabresi on the orders of leading Lotta Continua members Adriano Sofri and Giorgio Pietristefani.
2 November 1975	Pier Paolo Pasolini, writer, poet and film director	Giuseppe Pelosi	Died in Ostia after being run over by his own car which Pelosi had stolen.
9 June 1977	Taha Carım, Turkish ambassador to the Holy See	Justice Commandos of the Armenian Genocide	
9 May 1978	Aldo Moro, former Prime Minister of Italy	Red Brigades	Kidnapped and later killed. See Kidnapping of Aldo Moro.
9 May 1978	Giuseppe Impastato, anti-mafia activist	Sicilian Mafia	Killed by a charge of TNT placed under his own body.
24 January 1979	Guido Rossa, trade unionist	Red Brigades	Killed after denouncing colleague and Red Brigades propagandist Francesco Berardi to the police.
25 September 1979	Cesare Terranova, magistrate	on orders of Sicilian Mafia Commission	Shot along with his driver as he was being driven through Palermo.
6 January 1980	Piersanti Mattarella, President of Sicily	Sicilian Mafia	
20 February 1980	Vittorio Bachelet, Vice President of the High Council of the Judiciary	Red Brigades	Shot and killed on the staircase of the Faculty of Political Sciences of La Sapienzan while talking to his assistant Rosy Bindi.
30 April 1982	Pio La Torre, Communist politician	Sicilian Mafia	
3 September 1982	Carlo Alberto Dalla Chiesa, General of the Carabinieri Corps	Giuseppe Greco, Giuseppe Lucchese and members of the Mafia	Shot along with his wife and driver while being driven through Palermo while investigating the Mafia.
29 July 1983	Rocco Chinnici, magistrate	Giuseppe Greco, Michele Greco and members of the Mafia	Killed by a car bomb in Palermo.
15 February 1984	Leamon Hunt, Director General of Multinational Force and Observers (MFO)	Red Brigades	Killed outside his home in Rome.
20 March 1987	Licio Giorgieri, Italian air force general	Red Brigades (Claudio Nasti, Daniele Mennella)	Shot and killed in his car from shooters who fired from a motorcycle.
12 March 1992	Salvo Lima, Member of the European Parliament for the Italian Islands	Sicilian Mafia	Shot as he exited his car in Palermo.
23 May 1992	Giovanni Falcone, anti-mafia judge	Giovanni Brusca, a member of the Sicilian Mafia	Killed in a motorway bombing near Palermo.
19 July 1992	Paolo Borsellino, anti-mafia judge	Salvatore Riina and members of the Mafia	Killed along with five police officers by a car bomb in Palermo. See Massacre of Via D'Amelio.
27 March 1995	Maurizio Gucci, businessman	Hitman hired by his ex-wife, Patrizia Reggiani	Reggiani was convicted of ordering his murder in 1998.
19 March 2002	Marco Biagi, Labor Ministry advisor	New Red Brigades	Killed in Bologna.
21 July 2026	Luca Esposito, journalist		shot dead in Eboli

== Kosovo ==
Date	Victim(s)	Assassin(s)	Notes
28 June 1389	Murad I, Third Sultan of the Ottoman Empire	Miloš Obilić	Assassinated by a Serbian knight during the Battle of Kosovo.
29 November 1887	Ali Pasha of Gusinje, one of the leaders of the League of Prizren		Assassinated in Rugova Canyon near Peć.
25 July 1924	Azem Galica, Albanian guerrilla	Yugoslav forces	Galica was killed by Yugoslav forces in Galicë, Kosovo to suppress the movement against incorporating Kosovo into the newly formed state of Yugoslavia.
31 March 1903	Grigoriy Schterbina, Russian consul	Albanian Ottoman officer	Assassinated in Mitrovica
4 January 2003	Tahir Zemaj, general in the Kosovo Liberation Army		Assassinated in Peć.
15 June 2014	Elvis Pista, parliamentary candidate		Assassinated in Rahovec.
16 January 2018	Oliver Ivanović, former State Secretary for the Serbian Ministry for Kosovo and Metohija		Assassinated in North Mitrovica.

== Latvia ==
Date	Victim(s)	Assassin(s)	Notes
March 1994	Voldemārs Selga, president of the Latvian Reconstruction and Development Bank		He was killed near the same location as Gurevičs
May 1995	Moisejs Gurevičs, president of the firm Interpegro and a member of the Supervisory Board of Banka Baltija		He was assassinated using a TT-system pistol.
5 January 1996	Ivars Točs, businessman and co-owner of spirit/liquor trading firm Hanzas Jūras Vārti		Gunned down in Riga during early post-Soviet turf conflicts.
September 22, 1996	Valerijs Mačugins, Vice President and co-founder of the holding company Mono,		He was shot four times in the head and twice in the stomach in the courtyard of Dzirnavu Street 151. His murder remains unsolved.
September 22, 1996	Natālija Meisāne, Common-law wife of Valerijs Mačugins and the director of the modeling agency Natalie.		She was shot twice in the stomach during the ambush on Mačugins and died on the operating table in the hospital.
15 December 2000	Dainis Peimanis, chairman of Jaunrīgas spirtu rūpnīca.	Arnis Šķesters (executor); Raitis Natriņš (organizer)	Ambushed and blocked on the Jelgava–Riga highway while driving; Šķesters shot directly through the windshield, executing Peimanis.
15 October 2001	Jānis Laukroze, regional court judge.		Shot dead with an automatic weapon outside his apartment in central Riga. It remains one of the most high-profile judge assassinations in post-independence Latvian history.
28 November 2001	Gundars Matīss, crime journalist for Kurzemes Vārds.		Died from severe brain injury after being ambushed and brutally beaten in Liepāja on 15 November 2001 due to his investigative reporting.
March 2008	Leonids Rožeckins, Russian-American billionaire businessman and co-founder of MegaFon.		Mysteriously disappeared from his villa in Jūrmala; bloodstains were found at the scene, and police opened a murder investigation.
12 April 2009	Vjačeslavs Sturainis, businessman involved in port logistics and transit operations.	Andrei Zakharov	Gunned down in a contract-style execution in Jūrmala.
26 June 2012	Grigorijs Ņemcovs, Deputy Mayor of Daugavpils, publisher, and media owner.		Shot twice in the head at point-blank range in central Daugavpils.
26 June 2012	Nikolajs Kirilovs, owner of timber processing enterprise SIA Nikos OM.		Shot and killed in Jūrmala in a targeted attack.
31 January 2014	Andris Lucatnieks, businessman		Assasinated in Rezekne.
30 May 2018	Mārtiņš Bunkus, bankruptcy administrator	Mikhail Ulman, Alexander Babenko, and Viktor Krivoshey	Assassinated near Brothers' Cemetery in Riga. Was shot dead from a moving truck, while driving.
April 14, 2021	Romāns Bezzubovs		Cut off and blocked by a BMW X5 carrying attackers with Russian license plates. Gunmen opened heavy fire directly through the windshield and sides of Bezzubovs car, killing him at the scene.
11 March 2022	Genādijs Vaļagins, former key figure in the Haritonov organized crime syndicate.		Ambushed and shot to death inside his vehicle in the Pļavnieki neighborhood of Riga.

== Lithuania ==
Date	Victim(s)	Assassin(s)	Notes
12 September 1263	Mindaugas, King of Lithuania	Daumantas of Pskov and Treniota	Assassinated after taking his deceased wife Morta's sister as his new bride. She was however, already married to Daumantas. Treniota was Mindaugas' nephew.
1264	Treniota, Grand Duke of Lithuania	Courtiers loyal to Vaišvilkas, son of Mindaugas	
18 April 1267	Vaišvilkas, Grand Duke of Lithuania	Leo I of Galicia	
20 March 1440	Sigismund Kęstutaitis, Grand Duke of Lithuania	Supporters of his cousin, Švitrigaila	
12 October 1993	Vitas Lingys, one of the pioneers of investigative journalism in Lithuania	Person(s) directed by Boris Dekanidze, a Lithuanian criminal underworld figure, member of the "Vilnius Brigade".	

== Malta ==
Date	Victim(s)	Assassin(s)	Notes
26 October 1995	Fathi Shaqaqi, Secretary-General of the Islamic Jihad Movement in Palestine	Mossad	Shot outside a hotel in Sliema.
16 October 2017	Daphne Caruana Galizia, journalist and blogger	Unknown (investigation underway)	Killed by a car bomb near her home in Bidnija.

== Moldova ==
Date	Victim(s)	Assassin(s)	Notes
16 July 2023	Oleg Khorzhan, former leader of the Transnistrian Communist Party.	Unknown	Stabbed to death at his office in Sucleia, Transnistria (recognized internationally as part of Moldova).

== Montenegro ==
Date	Victim(s)	Assassin(s)	Notes
13 August 1860	Danilo I, Prince of Montenegro		Killed in Kotor (then Austria-Hungary) by a member of the Bjelopavlici tribe.
23 January 1916	Isa Boletini, Albanian revolutionary	Pero Burič	killed on Ribnica bridge, Podgorica, Montenegro
10 November 1945	Sekula Drljević, Montenegrin nationalist and President of the Governing Committee of Italian governorate of Montenegro during World War II		Killed by Chetniks at a Displaced Persons camp in Austria

== Monaco ==
11 October 1505	Jean II, Lord of Monaco	Lucien Grimaldi
22 August 1523	Lucien, Lord of Monaco	Bartholomew Doria of Dolceaqua
29 November 1604	Ercole, Lord of Monaco	Unknown
3 December 1999	Edmond Jacob Safra	Unknown

== Netherlands ==
Date	Victim(s)	Assassin(s)	Notes
5 June 754	Saint Boniface, Christian missionary		Killed by Frisian bandits
14 April 1099	Conrad, Bishop of Utrecht		
27 June 1296	Floris V, Count of Holland	Gerard van Velsen	
1425	Duke John of Straubing-Holland		
10 July 1584	William I of Orange, leader of the Dutch war of independence from Spanish rule (Eighty Years' War)	Balthasar Gérard	Shot by a supporter of the Spanish cause
2 May 1649	Isaac Dorislaus, diplomat		
20 August 1672	Johan de Witt, republican politician		Murdered by an Orangist lynch mob in The Hague.
20 August 1672	Cornelis de Witt, republican politician		Murdered by an Orangist lynch mob in The Hague.
23 May 1938	Yevhen Konovalets, Ukrainian nationalist	Pavel Sudoplatov, agent of the NKVD	Explosive placed in a box of chocolates.
6 February 1943	Hendrik Seyffardt, collaborator	Resistance group CS-6	shot twice after answering his door
3 June 1943	Folkert Posthuma, Nazi collaborator	Resistance group CS-6	Shot in front of his home in Vorden.
17 April 1945	Hannie Schaft, underground Resistance fighter	Dutch Nazi officials	Executed in the dunes of Bloemendaal.
22 March 1979	Richard Sykes, British Ambassador to the Netherlands	Provisional Irish Republican Army	Shot in The Hague.
9 September 1987	Gerrit Jan Heijn, top manager of Ahold	Ferdi Elsas	Kidnapped and later killed.
6 May 2002	Pim Fortuyn, academic and politician, critic of Islam, immigration and multicultural policy and leader of the Pim Fortuyn List	Volkert van der Graaf	Shot in Hilversum by a left-wing critic and animal rights advocate. See Assassination of Pim Fortuyn
24 January 2003	Cor Van Hout, criminal, mastermind of Freddy Heineken kidnapping	Unknown, under investigation	Killed on orders of his brother-in-law and ex-accomplice
2 November 2004	Theo van Gogh, film director, writer and critic of Islam	Mohammed Bouyeri	Shot and stabbed in Amsterdam by an Islamic extremist
15 November 2005	Louis Sévèke, leftwing journalist	Marcel Theunissen	Shot with a rifle in Nijmegen.
8 February 2014	Els Borst, former deputy prime minister		Stabbed at her home in Bilthoven.
15 December 2015	Mohammad-Reza Kolahi, Iranian dissident		Killed in Almere. Iranian intelligence agencies are accussed being behind the murder. Kolahi was suspected of being involved in the 1981 Iranian Prime Minister's office bombing.
9 November 2017	Ahmad Mola Nissi, co-founder of the Arab Struggle Movement for the Liberation of Ahwaz (ASMLA)		Killed in the Hague.
18 September 2019	Derk Wiersum, lawyer	Unknown, under investigation	Shot to death in Amsterdam.
6 July 2021	Peter R. de Vries, investigative journalist and crime reporter	Delano Geerman, Kamil Egiert, Krystian M	Shot in Amsterdam.

== Norway ==
Date	Victim(s)	Assassin(s)	Notes
14 December 1136	King Harald IV Gille of Norway	Sigurd Slembe	Killed by a pretender to the throne
21 July 1973	Ahmed Bouchikhi, Moroccan waiter	Mossad	Killed by two Mossad agents in Lillehammer who mistook him for Ali Hassan Salameh

== Poland ==
Date	Victim(s)	Assassin(s)	Notes
23 April 997	Adalbert of Prague, Bishop of Prague, missionary, saint	pagan Prussians led by Sicco	Assassinated in his efforts to convert the Baltic Prussians to Christianity
11 April 1079	Stanislaus of Szczepanów, Bishop of Kraków (now a saint)	Bolesław II the Bold	
24 November 1227	Leszek the White, High Duke of Poland		Assassinated at the Gąsawa massacre
8 February 1296	Przemysł II, King of Poland		Killed during a failed kidnapping.
15 October 1922	Sydir Tverdokhlib, poet	Ukrainian Military Organisation	Killed while campaigning for a seat in the Sejm of the Republic of Poland.
16 December 1922	Gabriel Narutowicz, President of Poland	Eligiusz Niewiadomski	Killed five days after his inauguration while attending the opening of an art exhibit at the Zachęta Gallery in Warsaw.
19 June 1926	Volodymyr Oskilko, major-general		Shot while in his hometown of Horodok.
7 June 1927	Pyotr Voykov, Soviet Envoy Extraordinary and Minister Plenipotentiary to Poland	Boris Kowerda	Killed by a White émigré.
29 August 1931	Tadeusz Hołówko, Prometheist politician and diplomat	Organization of Ukrainian Nationalists	Shot in the back of the head while in Truskavets.
15 June 1934	Bronisław Pieracki, Minister of Interior of Poland	Organization of Ukrainian Nationalists	Shot in the back of the head by Hryhorii Matseiko.
7 March 1941	Igo Sym, actor and Nazi collaborator	Bohdan Rogoliński, Roman Rozmiłowski, and Wiktor Klimaszewski of the Union of Armed Struggle (ZWZ)	
28 November 1942	Marceli Nowotko, Communist activist and first secretary of the Polish Workers' Party		His body was found on the street in Warsaw.
7 September 1943	Franz Bürkl, German Sicherheitspolizei officer	Jerzy Zborowski and members of the Szare Szeregi	See Operation Heads.
31 May 1943	Helmut Kapp, German Gestapo member	Armia Krajowa	See Operation Heads.
1 February 1944	Franz Kutschera, German SS general and chief of police	Armia Krajowa	See Operation Kutschera.
31 March 1944	Michajło Pohołowko, Ukrainian Nazi collaborator	Armia Krajowa	Mykhailo Pogotovko and two unknown guards were killed, see Operation "Ukrainian Committee"
5 July 1944	Karl Freudenthal, German officer of the SS, Kreishauptmann of powiat Garwolin	Armia Krajowa	See Operation Heads.
28 March 1947	Karol Świerczewski, Army general	Ukrainian Insurgent Army	
19 October 1984	Jerzy Popiełuszko, Roman Catholic priest		Killed by the communist political police.
25 June 1998	Marek Papała, Chief of the Police		Believed to have been killed by the Polish mafia.
5 December 1999	Andrzej Kolikowski, leader of the Pruszków mafia	Ryszard Bogucki	Shot in Zakopane
21 February 2005	Zdzisław Beksiński, painter, photographer, sculptor	Robert Kupiec	Stabbed 17 times
1 March 2011	Jolanta Brzeska, social activist	Unknown	Burned alive
13 January 2019	Paweł Adamowicz, Mayor of Gdańsk	Stefan Wilmont	Stabbed to death at a charity event.
15 June 2026	Semyon Skrepetsky, Bashkir satirist	unknown	Killed in Biala Podlaska

== Portugal ==
Date	Victim(s)	Assassin(s)	Notes
139 BC	Viriathus, leader of the Lusitanian people that resisted Roman expansion over the regions of Western Iberia	Audax, Ditalcus and Minurus	
7 January 1355	Inês de Castro, posthumously declared Queen of Portugal	Pêro Coelho, Álvaro Gonçalves, and Diogo Lopes Pacheco	Decapitated on the orders of Afonso IV of Portugal
6 December 1383	João Fernandes Andeiro, Galician count and lover to queen dowager Leonor Teles	John I of Portugal	Murdered by a nationalist political conspiracy to prevent the annexation of Portugal by Castille
23 October 1621	Pedro Barbosa de Luna, Secretary of State of the Kingdom of Portugal	unknown	Stabbed to death by unknown nationalist assailants near his home in Alfama
1 December 1640	Miguel de Vasconcelos, Secretary of State of the Kingdom of Portugal	Forty Conspirators	Shot to death and defenestrated from the window of the Independence Palace in Lisbon, by a nationalist group during the Portuguese Restoration coup.
10 March 1826	John VI of Portugal, King of Portugal	Unknown	Killed by repeated arsenic poisoning, died 6 days after the start of symptoms
6 May 1834	José Acúrsio das Neves, absolutist politician and historian	Unknown	Killed in a barnyard in Sarzedo, Arganil, by a pro-Liberal militia
4 November 1836	Agostinho José Freire, major of the Portuguese Army	Unknown rebel National Guardsman	Shot by rebel forces and robbed by the mob during the Belenzada coup attempt
1 February 1908	Carlos I of Portugal, King, and Luiz Filipe of Portugal, Crown Prince	Manuel Buíça and Alfredo Luís da Costa	Shot by assassins sympathetic to Republican interests and aided by anti-monarchic society Portuguese Carbonária. See Lisbon Regicide
3 October 1910	Miguel Bombarda, member of the Chamber of Deputies of Portugal	Aparício Rebelo dos Santos	Shot by a mental patient just before the 5 October 1910 revolution, of which he was a proponent
28 February 1915	Henrique Cardoso, member of the Chamber of Deputies of Portugal	Unknown gunmen	Shot on the back by the staircase leading down to Teatro Nacional de São Carlos by anti-Democratic assailants
14 May 1915	José Ribeiro da Cunha, former civil governor of Funchal	Unknown	Blown up by a grenade thrown into his residence during the May 14 Revolt
16 October 1918	Francisco Correia de Herédia, member of the Democratic Party	Unknown	Throat cut under suspicious circumstances by a bayonet during a gunfight that broke out while being transferred to another prison along with other political prisoners of the Sidonist regime.
14 December 1918	Sidónio Pais, President of Portugal	José Júlio da Costa	Shot at Rossio railway station in Lisbon. See Assassination of Sidónio Pais.
19 October 1921	António Joaquim Granjo, Prime Minister of Portugal	Several military rebels	See Bloody Night (Lisbon, 1921)
19 October 1921	António Machado Santos, Naval officer and leader of the National Republican Federation	Several military rebels	See Bloody Night (Lisbon, 1921)
19 October 1921	José Carlos da Maia	Several military rebels	See Bloody Night (Lisbon, 1921)
19 October 1921	Freitas da Silva	Several military rebels	See Bloody Night (Lisbon, 1921)
19 October 1921	Botelho de Vasconcelos	Several military rebels	See Bloody Night (Lisbon, 1921)
4 July 1945	Alfredo Dinis, member of central committee of the Portuguese Communist Party	José Gonçalves	Shot on the Bucelas road by the Portuguese intelligence while on his way to a clandestine meeting of the party
19 December 1961	José Dias Coelho, artist and Communist critic of the Estado Novo	António Domingues	Shot on the street by Portuguese intelligence
13 February 1965	Humberto Delgado, general, presidential candidate and critic of the Estado Novo	Casimiro Monteiro	Lured by Portuguese intelligence into an ambush near the Spanish border
2 April 1976	Padre Max, priest and Popular Democratic Union candidate	Unknown	Killed by a car bomb, allegedly set up by the right-wing terrorist group ELP.
21 August 1979	Joaquim Ferreira Torres, businessman	Unknown	Shot three times in his Porsche for being suspected of being a member of the right-wing terrorist group ELP.
4 December 1980	Francisco Sá Carneiro, Prime Minister of Portugal	Unknown	Killed on the 1980 Camarate plane crash
4 December 1980	Adelino Amaro da Costa, Minister of National Defence	Unknown	Killed on the 1980 Camarate plane crash
4 December 1980	António Patrício Gouveia, economist and the Prime Minister's Chief of Staff	Unknown	Killed on the 1980 Camarate plane crash
4 December 1980	Snu Abecassis	Unknown	Killed on the 1980 Camarate plane crash
10 April 1983	Issam Sartawi, senior member of the Palestine Liberation Organization	Yousef Al Awad (Abu Nidal Organization claimed responsibility)	Shot in a hotel.
28 October 1989	José Carvalho, militant of the Revolutionary Socialist Party	Pedro Grilo	Stabbed in the chest during a skinhead attack on the Revolutionary Socialist Party's headquarters.

== Romania ==
Date	Victim(s)	Assassin(s)	Notes
9 August 1601	Mihai Viteazul, Ruler of Wallachia, Moldavia and Transylvania	Militants on order of General Giorgio Basta	Assassinated near Câmpia Turzii after the victory at the Battle of Guruslău.
20 June 1862	Barbu Catargiu, Prime Minister of Romania	Unknown	Killed in Bucharest after a parliamentary meeting.
29 December 1933	Ion Duca, Prime Minister of Romania	Nicolae Constantinescu; Ion Caranica; Doru Belimace	Shot at Sinaia railway station by members of the Iron Guard.
30 November 1938	Corneliu Zelea Codreanu, far right politician and leader of the Iron Guard	Members of the Romanian Gendarmerie	Killed in Tâncăbeşti.
21 September 1939	Armand Călinescu, Prime Minister of Romania	Iron Guard	Shot while being driven through Bucharest.
26 November 1940	Gheorghe Argeșanu, former Prime Minister	Iron Guard	Murdered in Jilava prison with 63 other political prisoners. See Jilava massacre
27 November 1940	Nicolae Iorga, former Prime Minister of Romania, historian	Iron Guard	Kidnapped and later killed.
27 November 1940	Virgil Madgearu, politician and theorist of the National Peasants' Party	Iron Guard	Kidnapped and later killed
29 August 1945	Constantin Tănase, actor		Possibly killed by the invading Red Army after satirizing them.
24 December 1989	Danny Huwé, Belgian journalist		Shot by a sniper during the Romanian Revolution.

== Russia ==
Date	Victim(s)	Assassin(s)	Notes
Russian Empire
25 May 1682	Artamon Matveyev, statesman, diplomat and reformer	Streltsy	Killed during the Moscow uprising of 1682
25 May 1682	Grigory Romodanovsky, boyar, general and diplomat	Streltsy	Killed during the Moscow uprising of 1682
16 July 1762	Ivan VI of Russia, deposed Emperor of Russia	Unknown	Executed on prior instructions from Catherine the Great during an attempt to rescue him from imprisonment in Shlisselburg Fortress by Vasily Mirovich
17 July 1762	Peter III of Russia, Emperor of Russia	Unknown	Possibly organized by Catherine the Great
23 March 1801	Paul I of Russia, Emperor of Russia	Band of dismissed officers led by Levin August, Count von Bennigsen, Vladimir Mikhailovich Yashvil, Nikolay Zubov and others	Organized by Peter Ludwig von der Pahlen, Nikita Petrovich Panin and José de Ribas
27 December 1825	Mikhail Miloradovich, military Governor of Saint Petersburg	Pyotr Kakhovsky	Killed during the Decembrist revolt
16 August 1878	Nikolay Mezentsov, executive director of the Third Section	Sergey Stepnyak-Kravchinsky	Killed by a revolutionary belonging to the group Zemlya i volya
13 March 1881	Alexander II of Russia, Tsar of All the Russias	Ignacy Hryniewiecki	Killed in bombing organized by the revolutionary group Narodnaya Volya
21 March 1893	Nikolay Alekseyev, Mayor of Moscow	Andrianov	Killed by a deranged visitor in Moscow City Hall
15 April 1902	Dmitry Sipyagin, Russian Interior Minister	Stepan Balmashov	Killed by a member of the SR Combat Organization
28 July 1904	Vyacheslav von Plehve, Russian Interior Minister	Yegor Sazonov	Killed by a bomb thrown by a member of the SR Combat Organization
17 February 1905	Grand Duke Sergei Alexandrovich Romanov, former Governor-General of Moscow	Ivan Kalyayev	Organized by the SR Combat Organization
14 September 1911	Pyotr Stolypin, Prime Minister of Russia	Dmitry Bogrov	Killed in a theater in Kiev by a member of the Socialist Revolutionary Party
30 December 1916	Grigori Rasputin, influential mystic, adviser to the Russian Imperial Family	Group of nobles led by Felix Yusupov, Grand Duke Dmitri Pavlovich of Russia, Vladimir Purishkevich and Vasily Maklakov	Killed for his undue influence on the Russian Imperial Family
Provisional Government
24 December 1917	Ivan Logginovich Goremykin, former Prime Minister	Konstantin X Kotev	Murdered in his dacha during a robbery.
Bolshevik Russia
20 January 1918	Andrei Shingarev, Kadet politician	Red Guards	
20 January 1918	Fyodor Kokoshkin, Kadet politician	Red Guards	
17 July 1918	Tsar Nicholas II and his family: Tsarina Alexandra, Tsarevich Alexei, Grand Duchesses Olga, Tatiana, Maria and Anastasia, physician Eugene Botkin, maid Anna Demidova, footman Alexei Trupp and cook Ivan Kharitonov	Cheka officers led by Yakov Yurovsky	Order given by Yakov Sverdlov on behalf of Vladimir Lenin. See Murder of the Romanov family.
18 July 1918	Elizabeth of Hesse, Grand Duchess of Russia, Grand Duke Sergei Mikhailovich, Princes John Constantinovich, Constantine Constantinovich and Igor Constantinovich, poet and prince Vladimir Paley and nun Varvara Yakovleva	Cheka officers	Executed as part of the Red Terror
20 June 1918	V. Volodarsky, revolutionary	Grigory Ivanovich Semyonov	Killed by a member of the Socialist Revolutionary Party
6 July 1918	Wilhelm von Mirbach, German Ambassador in Moscow	Yakov Blumkin	Assassinated by the Left Socialist-Revolutionaries at the start of the Left SR uprising in an attempt to damage German-Soviet relations
30 July 1918	Moisei Uritsky, leader of the Petrograd Cheka	Leonid Kannegisser	Shot twice in Petrograd by a member of the Popular Socialists.
Russian SFSR in the Soviet Union
1 December 1934	Sergey Kirov, Bolshevik party leader in Leningrad	Leonid Nikolaev	Kirov's death would spark the Great Purge.
15 July 1939	Zinaida Reich, theatre actress	NKVD	killed in a staged robbery.
9 September 1990	Alexander Men, dissident Russian Orthodox priest	Unknown	
6 October 1991	Igor Talkov, singer-songwriter, anti-Soviet activist	Allegedly Valeriy Schlyafman	
Russian Federation
26 April 1994	Andrey Aizderdzis, Member of the State Duma	Unknown	Killed on the orders of gangster Viktor Burlachko
December 1994	Nikolay Suleimanov, Chechen mafia boss		
1 March 1995	Vladislav Listyev, journalist and head of the ORT TV Channel	Unknown	
21 April 1996	Dzhokhar Dudayev, first Chechen separatist President and anti-Russian guerrilla leader	Russian military	
1 October 1996	Choe Deok-geun, South Korean diplomat stationed in Vladivostok	Unknown	North Korean agents suspected
31 May 1998	Valeriy Hubulov, former Prime Minister of South Ossetia	Unknown	
8 June 1998	Larisa Yudina, Kalmyk journalist	Unknown	
20 November 1998	Galina Starovoytova, Member of the State Duma	Yuri Kolchin and Vitali Akishin	
18 October 2002	Valentin Tsvetkov, Governor of Magadan Oblast	Alexander Zakharov, Martin Babakekhyan and others	Killed in Moscow
17 April 2003	Sergei Yushenkov, Member of the State Duma and founder of the Liberal Russia party	Mikhail Kodanev and others	Killed in Moscow
3 July 2003	Yuri Shchekochikhin, journalist	Unknown	Killed in Moscow
9 May 2004	Akhmad Kadyrov, Kremlin-backed President of the Chechen Republic	Presumed to be Chechen Islamists	Killed along with about 30 others in a football stadium during a Victory Day parade by a bomb that had been built into the concrete of one of the stadium's supporting columns.
9 July 2004	Paul Klebnikov, editor of the Russian edition of Forbes magazine		
2 February 2005	Magomed Omarov, deputy Interior Minister of Dagestan		
8 March 2005	Aslan Maskhadov, President of separatist Chechnya	FSB	
10 April 2005	Anatoly Trofimov, former deputy director of the FSB		
17 June 2006	Abdul-Khalim Sadulayev, President of separatist Chechnya		Killed by pro-Russian forces.
7 October 2006	Anna Politkovskaya, journalist and human rights campaigner	Unknown; many theories	Shot in the elevator block of her apartment in Moscow. See Assassination of Anna Politkovskaya.
10 october 2008	Fyodor "Nok" Filatov	BORN	BORN members
26 November 2008	Vitaly Karayev, mayor of Vladikavkaz, North Ossetia–Alania	Alexander Jussoyev	
17 December 2008	Nina Varlamova, mayor of Kandalaksha, Murmansk Oblast	Dmitry Kireyev	
31 December 2008	Kazbek Pagiyev, former mayor of Vladikavkaz, North Ossetia–Alania		
19 January 2009	Anastasia Baburova, journalist	Nikita Tikhonov Eugenia Khasis	
19 January 2009	Stanislav Markelov, human rights lawyer		
5 June 2009	Adilgerei Magomedtagirov, interior minister of Dagestan		
10 June 2009	Aza Gazgireyeva, deputy chair of the Ingushetia Supreme Court		
13 June 2009	Bashir Aushev, former deputy prime minister of Ingushetia		
15 July 2009	Natalia Estemirova, human rights activist		
16 November 2009	Ivan Khutorskoy, a prominent member of the Russian anti-fascist movement	Born	
16 November 2009	Ilya Dzhaparidze, anti-fascistactivist	Born militants	
12 April 2010	federal city court judge Eduard Chuvashov[ru]	Alexei Korshunov	
10 June 2011	Yuri Budanov, army officer and convicted war criminal	Yusup Temerkhanov	
15 December 2011	Gadzhimurat Kamalov, journalist		
27 February 2015	Boris Nemtsov, former Deputy Prime Minister of Russia		Shot while walking on a bridge near the Moscow Kremlin. See Assassination of Boris Nemtsov
2 November 2020	Vladimir "Sausage King" Marugov, oligarch	Alexander Mavridi	Shot on 2 November with a crossbow in the sauna of his countryside estate outside Moscow.
20 August 2022	Darya Dugina, ultranationalist journalist and writer	National Republican Army	Killed in car bomb explosion.
2 April 2023	Vladlen Tatarsky, blogger	Darya Trepova	Killed with a bomb disguised as an award statue.
6 December 2023	Illia Kyva, Ukrainian politician, member of the Verkhovna Rada, sentenced to treason in Ukraine	Security Service of Ukraine	Shot dead in a park in the village of Suponevo.
17 December 2024	Igor Kirillov, lieutenant general and head of the NDC Protection Troops	Akhmad Kurbanov (suspected)	Killed along with an assistant by a bomb hidden an electric scooter. The Security Service of Ukraine claimed responsibility for the assassination.
25 April 2025	Yaroslav Moskalik, lieutenant General and Deputy Chief of the Main Operations Directorate of the General Staff	Ignat Kuzin (suspected)	Killed by a car bomb explosion in Balashikha. Suspect formerly lived in Ukraine and is accused of taking $18,000 from Ukrainian intelligence in exchange for planting the explosive.
22 December 2025	Fanil Sarvarov, lieutenant General and Chief of the Operational Training Directorate of the General Staff	Security Service of Ukraine(suspected)	Killed by car bomb in Moscow.
10 June 2026	Damir Davydov, Colonel		Killed by car bomb in Moscow.

== Serbia ==
Date	Victim(s)	Assassin(s)	Notes
Roman Empire
September 268	Gallienus, Roman emperor		Killed near Naissus.
September 282	Probus, Roman emperor		Assassinated at Sirmium.
285	Carinus, Roman emperor		Assassinated at Margus.
Medieval Serbia
1359	Vuk Kosača, magnate and nobleman		Killed or ordered so by a member of the Rastislalić family.
Ottoman period
23–29 January 1804	72 notable Serbs	Dahije	Slaughter of the Knezes
1815	Kara-Marko Vasić, revolutionary		Ordered by Miloš Obrenović.
16 June 1816	Melentije Nikšić, revolutionary		Ordered by Miloš Obrenović.
25 July 1817	Karađorđe Petrović, leader of the First Serbian Uprising	Nikola Novaković	Killed along with his secretary, Naum Krnar in the village of Radovanje by a henchman of Vujica Vulićević and Miloš Obrenović.
Serbian monarchy
10 June 1868	Mihailo Obrenović, Prince of Serbia	Pavle Radovanović and Kosta Radovanović	Shot in Košutnjak park in Belgrade as part of a conspiracy.
1885	Čakr-paša, hajduk	Toma Stanković	
11 June 1903	Aleksandar Obrenović, King of Serbia, and Draga Mašin, Queen Consort	Army officers led by Dragutin Dimitrijević	Killed in the royal palace as part of the May Overthrow.
11 June 1903	Lazar Petrović, Adjutant to King Aleksandar Obrenović		Killed as part of the May Overthrow.
11 June 1903	Dimitrije Cincar-Marković, Prime Minister of Serbia		
Yugoslavia
21 July 1921	Milorad Drašković, Yugoslav interior minister	Alija Alijagić	Killed by a Bosnian communist.
13 January 1928	Velimir Prelić, legal adviser in Skoplje	Mara Buneva	Shot on "Ratomir Putnik" Street in Skoplje
20 June 1928	Đuro Basariček, Member of Parliament for the Croatian Peasant Party	Puniša Račić	Shot by a Serbian radical deputy in the Yugoslav Parliament in Belgrade.
20 June 1928	Stjepan Radić, Member of Parliament for the Croatian Peasant Party	Puniša Račić	Shot by a Serbian radical deputy in the Yugoslav Parliament in Belgrade.
9 March 1983	Galip Balkar, Turkish Ambassador to Yugoslavia	Harutyun Krikor Levonian and Alexander Elbekyan.	Shot by Armenian nationalists. See Assassination of Galip Balkar
FR Yugoslavia/Serbia and Montenegro
8 April 1994	Dada Vujasinović, journalist		
12 December 1994	Goran Vuković, criminal		
11 April 1999	Slavko Ćuruvija, journalist		
15 January 2000	Željko Ražnatović "Arkan", mobster and warlord	Dobrosav Gavrić	
7 February 2000	Pavle Bulatović, defense minister		
25 April 2000	Žika Petrović, Jat Airways executive		
13 May 2000	Boško Perošević, Chairman of the Executive Council of Vojvodina	Milivoje Gutović	Assassinated at Novi Sad Fair.
25 August 2000	Ivan Stambolić, former president of Serbia	Special Operations Unit	Ordered by Slobodan Milošević. See Assassination of Ivan Stambolić.
11 June 2001	Milan Pantić, journalist	Unknown	
12 March 2003	Zoran Đinđić, Prime Minister of Serbia	Zvezdan Jovanović	Killed with a sniper rifle by a paramilitary linked to the Zemun Clan. See Assassination of Zoran Đinđić.
26 March 2004	Branko Bulatović, Football Association general secretary	Unknown	
Republic of Serbia
1 July 2006	Radoljub Kanjevac, criminal	Unknown	
2 April 2014	Rade Rakonjac, Arkan's bodyguard	Unknown	Rakonjac had close ties to the Serbian mafia and the Serbian warlord Arkan.

== Slovakia ==
Date	Victim(s)	Assassin(s)	Notes
11 January 1999	Ján Ducký, former Minister of Industry	unknown	shot dead in the hallway of an apartment house in Bratislava.
21 February 2018	Ján Kuciak, journalist	Miroslav Marček and Tomáš Szabó	Shot dead along with his fiancée while investigating the activities of various individuals connected to the Slovak government led by Robert Fico.

== Slovenia ==
Date	Victim(s)	Assassin(s)	Notes
7 June 1992	Ivan Kramberger, inventor and politician	Peter Rotar (presumed)	Shot dead during his campaign to become an MP.

== Spain ==
Date	Victim(s)	Assassin(s)	Notes
23 March 1369	Peter the Cruel, King of Castile	Henry II of Castile	
14 September 1485	Pedro de Arbués, a prominent member of the Spanish Inquisition		Assassinated while praying in La Seo Cathedral of Zaragosa. His death allowed Grand Inquisitor Tomás de Torquemada to massively expand the Spanish Inquisition.
7 June 1640	Dalmau de Queralt, Count of Santa Coloma, Viceroy of Catalonia		Killed in a riot by Catalan peasants in Sant Andreu de Palomar (see Corpus de Sang). His death escalated the Reapers' War.
28 December 1870	Juan Prim, Prime Minister of Spain and Governor of Puerto Rico		Shot in Madrid by unknown hand.
8 August 1897	Antonio Cánovas del Castillo, Prime Minister of Spain	Michele Angiolillo	Shot in a spa in Mondragón, Guipúzcoa by an anarchist.
12 November 1912	José Canalejas, Prime Minister of Spain	Manuel Pardiñas	Shot in Madrid by an anarchist.
30 November 1920	Francesc Layret, Catalan left-wing politician	gunmen from the Sindicatos Libres	Shot in Barcelona.
8 March 1921	Eduardo Dato Iradier, Prime Minister of Spain	Lluís Nicolau, Pere Mateu, and Ramon Casanelles	Shot in Madrid by Catalan anarchists.
4 June 1923	Juan Soldevila y Romero, Roman Catholic archbishop of Zaragoza	Los Solidarios	
12 July 1936	José Castillo, Spanish Socialist Workers' Party lieutenant in the Assault Guards	Falangist gunmen	Killed in Madrid.
13 July 1936	José Calvo Sotelo, right-wing politician and former Finance Minister		Killed in a police vehicle in Madrid. His murder helped trigger the Spanish Civil War.
19 August 1936	Federico García Lorca, poet and dramatist	Nationalists	Shot at Alfacar by fascists.
17 September 1936	Raoul Villain, assassin of Jean Jaurès		Shot on the island of Ibiza.
5 May 1937	Camillo Berneri, Italian anarchist		possibly killed on the orders of Joseph Stalin
20 June 1937	Andrés Nin, Communist revolutionary		Taken to a camp by the Spanish Government and probably killed there (this is disputed).
15 October 1940	Lluis Companys, President of Catalonia	Gestapo officers on the orders of Francisco Franco.	Shot in Barcelona.
4 January 1967	Mohamed Khider, exiled Algerian politician and former secretary-general of the FLN		Killed in Madrid.
2 August 1968	Melitón Manzanas, secret police officer and state torturer	ETA	Killed at Irún, Guipúzcoa.
20 April 1969	Vjekoslav Luburić, exiled Croatian Ustaše official and fugitive war criminal		Believed to have been killed either by Yugoslav agents or rivals in the Croatian émigré community.
20 December 1973	Luis Carrero Blanco, Prime Minister of Spain	ETA	Killed by a bomb which threw his car over a building. His murder was, according to ETA, then to intensify existing divisions within Francoist Spain between the "openness" and "purists". See Assassination of Luis Carrero Blanco.
4 October 1976	Juan María de Araluce Villar, President of the Provincial Deputation of Gipuzkoa	ETA	Killed at San Sebastián, Guipúzcoa.
9 May 1977	José María Bultó, textile and chemical entrepreneur	EPOCA	Assaulted at home of his son, where he lived. The men who assaulted him then attached a bomb to his body and demanded 500 million pesetas to free him. Bultó refused to pay and was killed while trying to get rid of the bomb causing it to detonate.
8 October 1977	Augusto Unceta Barrenechea, President of the Provincial Deputation of Biscay	ETA	Killed at Guernica, Biscay.
25 January 1978	Joaquin Viola, former mayor of Barcelona	EPOCA	Killed alongside his wife when a bomb attached to his chest during a break in of the couples home exploded prematurely
20 November 1984	Santiago Brouard, Basque nationalist	Grupos Antiterroristas de Liberación	
14 February 1996	Francisco Tomás y Valiente, former president of the Constitutional Court	ETA	Shot in his office at the Autonomous University of Madrid.
13 July 1997	Miguel Ángel Blanco, Basque municipal councillor	ETA	Kidnapped and later killed.
22 February 2000	Fernando Buesa, former Vice Lehendakari of the Basque Country	ETA	Car bombing in Vitoria.
21 November 2000	Ernest Lluch, former Minister of Health	ETA	Shot in Barcelona.
12 May 2014	Isabel Carrasco, Governor of León and provincial leader of the People's Party	Montserrat González	Shot in León by a disgruntled government employee.
19 February 2025	Arturo Torró, former Mayor of Gandia		
21 May 2025	Andriy Portnov, Ukrainian lawyer and politician	Unknown	Shot outside the American School of Madrid.

== Sweden ==
Date	Victim(s)	Assassin(s)	Notes
25 December 1156	King Sverker I of Sweden		Killed by a servant.
18 May 1160	King Eric IX of Sweden		Killed during a rebellion.
12 April 1167	King Charles VII of Sweden		Killed by supporters of Knut Eriksson
4 May 1436	Engelbrekt Engelbrektsson, Regent of Sweden	Magnus Bengtsson	
26 February 1577	King Eric XIV of Sweden		Killed on orders of his half-brother King John III of Sweden
16 March 1792	King Gustav III of Sweden	Jacob Johan Anckarström	Shot at a masquerade ball and died two weeks later.
20 June 1810	Count Axel von Fersen, Marshal of the Realm	Four members of the lynching mob were charged for the killing, among them the Finnish nobleman Otto Johan Tandefelt	Killed by a mob in Stockholm after being blamed for the death of Crown Prince Carl August. Army soldiers were present at the scene, but were ordered not to interfere.
7 April 1971	Vladimir Rolović, Yugoslav Ambassador to Sweden	Croatian National Resistance	
28 February 1986	Olof Palme, Prime Minister of Sweden	Unknown	Shot on his way home from a cinema in Stockholm accompanied only by his wife
10 September 2003	Anna Lindh, Minister for Foreign Affairs of Sweden	Mijailo Mijailović	Stabbed while visiting the NK department store in Stockholm and died a day later. She was prominently featured in the "Yes" campaign during the Euro referendum, which took place later in the same weekend. She did not have any protective detail assigned to her, because the Swedish Security Police had not received, or perceived there to be no specific threats made against her.
29 January 2025	Salwan Momika, Iraqi atheist and anti-Islam activist	Five persons arrested in connection to the murder.	Shot at his apartment in Södertälje while doing a TikTok livestream. May possibly be in relation to his role and activism in the 2023 Quran burnings in Sweden. Pending investigation.

== Switzerland ==
Date	Victim(s)	Assassin(s)	Notes
1 May 1308	Albert I of Habsburg, German King and Duke of Austria	John Parricida	Killed by his nephew, whom he had deprived of his inheritance, at Windisch on the Reuss.
25 February 1621	Pompeius Planta, politician	Jörg Jenatsch	
24 January 1639	Jörg Jenatsch, politician		Killed in Chur by an assailant dressed as a bear.
10 September 1898	Empress Elisabeth of Austria	Luigi Lucheni	Stabbed in the heart with a sharp needle file by an anarchist on the street in Geneva. Due to her extremely tight corset, she had no idea she has been wounded and collapsed suddenly after walking 100 yards (91 m). She died two hours later due to slow internal hemorrhaging.
10 May 1923	Vatslav Vorovsky, Soviet diplomat	Maurice Conradi	Killed by a White emigre
4 February 1936	Wilhelm Gustloff, leader of the Swiss Nazi Party	David Frankfurter	Killed by a Yugoslav Jewish student
3 November 1960	Félix-Roland Moumié, Cameroonian anti-colonialist activist and leader of the Union of the Peoples of Cameroon		Assassinated by the SDECE (French secret services).
24 April 1990	Kazem Rajavi, exiled Iranian opposition leader		Believed to have been killed by agents of the Islamic Republic of Iran as part of the Chain Murders

== Turkey ==
Date	Victim(s)	Assassin(s)	Notes
27 November 395	Flavius Rufinus, Eastern Roman statesman	Gothic mercenaries led by Gainas	
4 May 1481	Karamani Mehmed Pasha, Grand Vizier	Pro-Bayezid II Janissarys	
1567	Mahmud Pasha, governor of Egypt		Killed by gunfire
11 October 1579	Sokollu Mehmed Pasha, Grand Vizier of Ottoman Empire		
20 May 1622	Osman II, Sultan of the Ottoman Empire	Janissarys	
2 September 1651	Kösem Sultan, Valide Sultan of the Ottoman Empire	Chief Black Eunuch Lala Süleyman, Hoca Reyhan Agha, Hajji Ibrahim Agha and Ali Agha	Assassinated at Topkapı Palace during a palace coup
16 February 1659	Abaza Hasan Pasha, provincial governor and rebel		Assassinated in Aleppo while preparing for prayer
10 April 1821	Gregory V of Constantinople, Ecumenical Patriarch	Mob	Lynched by a mob orchestrated by Sultan Mahmud II
15 June 1876	Hüseyin Avni Pasha, War Minister	Çerkez Hasan	Shot in the Çerkez Hasan incident
15 June 1876	Mehmed Râşid Pasha, Foreign Minister	Çerkez Hasan	Shot in the Çerkez Hasan incident
26 April 1883	Midhat Pasha, Prime Minister and revolutionary		Killed in his jail cell on the orders of Hejaz governor Osman Nuri Pasha and Sultan Abdul Hamid II
7 July 1908	Şemsi Pasha, general	Atıf Kamçıl	Shot as part of the Young Turk Revolution
3 August 1908	Serfahiye Fehim Pasha, intelligence officer	Mob	Lynched by a mob in aftermath of Young Turk Revolution
6 April 1909	Hasan Fehmi Bey, journalist		Likely killed by members of the CUP
14 April 1909	Emir Arslan Bey, MP for Latakia	Mob	Lynched by mob for being mistaken for Hüseyin Cahit (Yalçin) during 31 March Incident
14 April 1909	Mustafa Nazım Pasha, Minister of Justice	Mob	Lynched by mob for being mistaken for Ahmed Rıza during 31 March Incident
9 June 1910	Ahmet Samim, journalist and opposition politician		Likely killed by members of the CUP
2 August 1911	Apostol Petkov, Macedonian Bulgarian revolutionary and militant		Poisoned
2 August 1911	Ioryi Mucitano, Aromanian revolutionary and militant		Poisoned
10 December 1912	Bedros Kapamajian, mayor of Van	Aram Manukian	Shot twice in the head. Gunman acted on the orders from the Dashnak Committee
23 January 1913	Nazım Pasha, War Minister and Chief of Staff of the Ottoman Army	Yakub Cemil	Shot by Yakub Cemil during the 1913 Ottoman coup d'état.
11 June 1913	Mahmud Şevket Pasha, Prime Minister and War Minister		Shot in a revenge attack by a relative of the assassinated War Minister Nazım Pasha
28 May 1915	Yenovk Shahen, Armenian actor and director		
15 June 1915	Harutiun Jangülian, Armenian historian and activist	Hacı Tellal Hekimoğlu	Murdered by members of the Special Organization
July 1915	Khachatur Malumian, Armenian politician and journalist	Çerkez Ahmet, Halil, Nazım	Murdered by members of the Special Organization
July 1915	Krikor Zohrab, Armenian politician, writer, lawyer	Çerkez Ahmet, Halil, Nazım	Murdered by members of the Special Organization
July 1915	Vartkes Serengülian, Armenian politician, activist	Çerkez Ahmet, Halil, Nazım	Murdered by members of the Special Organization
15 August 1915	Shavarsh Krissian, Armenian athlete, journalist, editor, writer		
16 August 1915	Rupen Zartarian, Armenian writer, teacher, activist	Çerkez Ahmet, Halil, Nazım	Murdered by members of the Special Organization
16 August 1915	Ardashes Harutiunian, Armenian poet, translator, literary critic		Stabbed to death together with his father near Derbent
26 August 1915	Ruben Sevak, Armenian poet, writer, doctor		
26 August 1915	Daniel Varoujan, Armenian poet and writer		Tortured and killed by Kurdish bandits
1915	Garegin Khazhak, Armenian journalist, writer, political activist	Hacı Tellal Hekimoğlu	Murdered by members of the Special Organization
1915	Sarkis Minassian, Armenian journalist, writer, educator	Hacı Tellal Hekimoğlu	Murdered by members of the Special Organization
1915	Nazaret Daghavarian, Armenian activist, doctor	Hacı Tellal Hekimoğlu	Murdered by members of the Special Organization
1915	Dikran Chökürian, Armenian writer, educator		
1915	Armen Dorian, Armenian poet, teacher		
1915	Parsegh Shahbaz, Armenian lawyer, activist, and journalist		Severely beaten and killed by gendarmes under the wall of 'a factory'
1915	Parunak Ferukhan, Armenian civil servant and violinist		
1915	Levon Larents Kirisciyan, Armenian writer, translator, editor, journalist, teacher		
1915	Harutiun Shahrigian, Armenian politician, militant, lawyer, and author		
1915	Kegham Parseghian, Armenian writer, teacher, journalist		
1915	Garabed Pashayan Khan, Armenian doctor and political activist		
1915	Siamanto, Armenian writer and poet		
1915	Hagop Terzian, Armenian writer and pharmasist		
1915	Haig Tiriakian, Armenian militant and journalist		
1915	Smpad Piurad, Armenian intellectual, writer, publisher, and public activist		
1915	Jacques Sayabalian, Armenian writer and poet		
1915	Krikor Torosian, Armenian satirist, journalist, writer		
1915	Melkon Giurdjian, Armenian writer professor, civic activist		Killed by gendarmes
1915	Diran Kelekian, Armenian journalist and professor		
28 January 1921	Mustafa Subhi, socialist and founder of the Communist Party of Turkey	Yahya the Sailor	Assassination believed to have been arranged by supporters of Enver Pasha
18 July 1921	Behbud Khan Javanshir, Azerbaijani Minister of Internal Affairs	Misak Torlakian	Shot and killed by Dashnak gunman in Constantinople as part of Operation Nemesis in revenge for the 1918 Massacre of Armenians in Baku.
6 November 1922	Ali Kemal, journalist and Interior Minister	Mob	Lynched by a mob orchestrated by Nureddin Pasha
16 November 1922	Hüseyin Hilmi, socialist activist	Ali Haydar	
27 March 1923	Ali Şükrü Bey, MP	Topal Osman	Discovered dead with Topal Osman indicted as the perpetrator.
17 May 1971	Efraim Elrom, Israeli consul-general	Mahir Çayan, Ulaş Bardakçı, and Hüseyin Cevahir	Kidnapped and murdered by the People's Liberation Party-Front of Turkey (THKPC).
11 March 1978	Bedrettin Cömert, academic, writer, art historian	Rıfat Yıldırım, Üzeyir Bayraklı and by another man nicknamed "Ahmet"	Shot dead in his car by members of the Grey Wolves, believed to have been orchestrated by Abdullah Çatlı
24 March 1978	Doğan Öz, prosecutor	Haluk Kırcı	Killed by a Grey Wolf while investigating the Turkish deep state
20 October 1978	Bedri Karafakıoğlu, academic and rector		
1 February 1979	Abdi İpekçi, journalist and human rights activist	Oral Çelik and Mehmet Ali Ağca	Killed by members of the Grey Wolves
23 February 1979	Metin Yüksel, Islamist activist	Grey Wolves	
28 September 1979	Cevat Yurdakul, lawyer and police chief	Abdurrahman Kıpçak and Muhsin Kehya	Killed by members of the Grey Wolves
19 November 1979	İlhan Egemen Darendelioğlu, journalist		Shot by unidentified left-wing militants
7 December 1979	Cavit Orhan Tütengil, sociologist, writer		
11 April 1980	Ümit Kaftancıoğlu, journalist and TV producer	Ahmet Mustafa Kıvılcım	Attacked by right-wing gunmen as he left his house to go to work
27 May 1980	Gün Sazak, Turkish nationalist and former Minister of Customs and Monopolies	Mehmet Edip Eranıl, Ahmet Levent Babacan, Sadık Zafer Özcan and Cengiz Gül	Shot by members of Dev Sol
19 July 1980	Nihat Erim, former Prime Minister	Dev Sol	Shot by two gunmen outside his apartment.
22 July 1980	Kemal Türkler, socialist and labour activist	Grey Wolves	Shot in front of his house
22 October 1988	Esat Oktay Yıldıran, soldier and warden	PKK	Shot dead on the bus in Ümraniye,
31 January 1990	Muammer Aksoy, lawyer and journalist	Islamic Movement	Murdered in front of his home.
7 March 1990	Çetin Emeç, journalist		Shot in his car with a silencer. Unsolved murder
4 September 1990	Turan Dursun, intellectual and author	İrfan Çağırıcı and Muzaffer Dalmaz	Assassinated by two gunmen
6 October 1990	Bahriye Üçok, academic and women's rights activist	Unknown	Killed by a letter bomb. Unresolved case
30 January 1991	Hulusi Sayın, gendarme commander	Dev Sol	
7 April 1991	Memduh Ünlütürk, general	Dev Sol	
7 July 1991	Vedat Aydın, Kurdish rights activist		Disappeared and killed by people falsely claiming to be police
7 March 1992	Ehud Sadan, Israeli Embassy in Ankara Chief of Security	Farhan Osman and Nejadt Yoksal	Killed in a car bombing outside an Ankara market.
29 July 1992	Kemal Kayacan, MP and admiral		
20 September 1992	Musa Anter, Kurdish rights activist	Mahmut Yıldırım and Abdülkadir Aygan	Shot by several gunmen found to be working for JITEM
13 January 1993	Zübeyir Akkoç, trade unionist		
24 January 1993	Uğur Mumcu, investigative journalist	Unknown	Killed with a carbomb. Unresolved case
17 February 1993	Eşref Bitlis, gendarme commander	Unknown	Killed in an engineered plane crash. Unresolved case
4 September 1993	Mehmet Sincar, MP and Kurdish rights activist	Turkish Revenge Brigade	
22 October 1993	Bahtiyar Aydın, gendarme commander	Inconclusive responsibility	
4 November 1993	Cem Ersever, gendarme commander	Inconclusive responsibility	
4 November 1993	İhsan Hakan, PKK defector	Inconclusive responsibility	Found shot in the head in Avcılar, Ankara
14 April 1994	Alpaslan Pehlivanlı, lawyer, politician, and MP	Unknown	
11 January 1995	Onat Kutlar, writer and poet	PKK	
9 January 1996	Özdemir Sabancı, businessman	DHKP-C	
28 July 1996	Ömer Lütfü Topal, businessman and drug trafficer		
21 October 1999	Ahmet Taner Kışlalı, MP, academic and Minister of Culture	Unknown	Killed with a carbomb. Unresolved case
24 January 2001	Gaffar Okkan, police chief	Kurdish Hezbollah	Killed in an ambush
24 August 2001	Üzeyir Garih, engineer, businessman, writer and investor		
18 December 2002	Necip Hablemitoğlu, historian and intellectual		Unresolved murder case
6 July 2005	Hikmet Fidan, Kurdish rights activist		Shot by two armed gunmen in the back of the head with a silencer
5 February 2006	Andrea Santoro, Catholic priest	Oğuzhan Akdin	
17 May 2006	Mustafa Yücel Özbilgin, supreme court magistrate	Alparslan Arslan	
19 January 2007	Hrant Dink, Turkish-Armenian activist and journalist	Ogün Samast	
18 April 2007	Necati Aydın	Yunus Emre Günaydın and four accomplices	Zirve Publishing House murders
18 April 2007	Uğur Yüksel	Yunus Emre Günaydın and four accomplices	Zirve Publishing House murders
18 April 2007	Tilmann Geske	Yunus Emre Günaydın and four accomplices	Zirve Publishing House murders
16 November 2007	İhya Balak, director of the national lottery		
19 December 2009	Cihan Hayırsevener, journalist		
27 December 2015	Naji al Jerf, journalist	ISIS	
19 December 2016	Andrei Karlov, Russian Ambassador to Turkey.	Mevlüt Mert Altıntaş	Assassination of Andrei Karlov
24 February 2016	Rohat Aktaş, journalist		
2 October 2018	Jamal Khashoggi, Saudi journalist		Killed by agents of the Saudi government at the Saudi consulate in Istanbul
30 December 2022	Sinan Ateş, academic, historian, and former general chairman of the Grey Wolves	Eray Özyağcı	Shot and killed by Özyağcı while walking in the Çankaya District of Ankara and died on the way to the hospital. His brother-in-law Selman Bozkurt was accidentally hit and wounded by a bullet in the shoulder.

== United Kingdom ==
Date	Victim(s)	Assassin(s)	Notes
293	Carausius, usurper of the Western Roman Empire	Allectius who Carausius appointed treasurer	coup d'état
26 May 946	Edmund I, King of England	Leofa	Stabbed at a banquet
18 March 978	Edward the Martyr, King of England	Ælfthryth	
995	Kenneth II, King of Scotland		
2 August 1100	William Rufus, King of England	Walter Tirel	Shot in the heart with an arrow by a nobleman, supposedly by accident, but the circumstances remain unclear.
29 December 1170	Thomas Becket, Archbishop of Canterbury	Four knights	Stabbed to death in Canterbury Cathedral on the orders of Henry II of England
10 February 1306	John III Comyn, Lord of Badenoch	Robert the Bruce, Roger de Kirkpatrick	
October 1346	Raghnall Mac Ruaidhrí	William III, Earl of Ross	Killed at Elcho Priory while attending a royal muster on the eve of a Scottish invasion of England.
14 June 1381	Robert Hales, Lord High Treasurer		Beheaded at Tower Hill by rebels during the Peasants' Revolt.
14 June 1381	Simon of Sudbury, Lord Chancellor, Archbishop of Canterbury and Bishop of London		Beheaded at Tower Hill by rebels during the Peasants' Revolt.
15 June 1381	John Cavendish, Chief Justice of the King's Bench, Chancellor of the University of Cambridge		Beheaded in Bury St Edmunds by rebels during the Peasants' Revolt.
21 February 1437	King James I of Scotland	Walter Stewart, Earl of Atholl (coup leader), Sir Robert Graham (dealt lethal blow)	Killed at Perth in a failed coup by his kinsman and former ally Walter Stewart.
22 February 1452	William Douglas, 8th Earl of Douglas	James II of Scotland	
21 May 1471	Henry VI of England, King of England		Killed in the Tower of London likely on the orders of Edward IV of England.
11 June 1488	King James III of Scotland		Killed by rebels.
9 March 1566	David Rizzio, private secretary of Mary, Queen of Scots	Henry Stuart, Lord Darnley, husband of Mary, Queen of Scots	Stabbed 57 times in front of the Queen by a mob led by her husband out of jealousy over their friendship
10 February 1567	Henry Stuart, Lord Darnley, husband of Mary, Queen of Scots		Killed in an explosion at Kirk o' Field, Edinburgh
23 January 1570	James Stewart, 1st Earl of Moray, Regent of Scotland	James Hamilton	The first assassination carried out with a firearm.
23 August 1628	George Villiers, 1st Duke of Buckingham, Lord High Admiral/royal favourite	John Felton	Stabbed in Portsmouth as he planned a second expedition to La Rochelle.
3 May 1679	James Sharp, Archbishop of St Andrews		Killed in Fife.
11 May 1812	Spencer Perceval, Prime Minister of the United Kingdom	John Bellingham	Killed by a disgruntled merchant. The only British prime minister to be assassinated. See Assassination of Spencer Perceval.
22 July 1812	Louis-Alexandre de Launay, French diplomat		Stabbed to death with a stiletto along with his wife by a former servant at his home in Barnes.
22 June 1922	Henry Hughes Wilson, British field marshal, retired Chief of the Imperial General Staff and Conservative politician	Reginald Dunne and Joseph O'Sullivan	Killed outside his house in Eaton Square, London, by members of the Irish Republican Army.
13 March 1940	Michael O'Dwyer, former Lieutenant Governor of the Punjab	Udham Singh, a Punjabi revolutionary	Killed during a speech at Caxton Hall, London over his involvement in the Amritsar Massacre
18 September 1972	Ami Shachori, Israeli agriculture attaché	Black September Organization	Killed by a letter bomb addressed to him.
25/26 June 1973	Paddy Wilson, former general secretary of the Social Democratic and Labour Party	Ulster Freedom Fighters	Stabbed to death in Belfast, along with his friend Irene Andrews. See Paddy Wilson and Irene Andrews killings.
27 November 1975	Ross McWhirter, co-author of the Guinness Book of Records and right-wing political activist	Harry Duggan and Hugh Doherty	Killed outside his home in Bush Hill Park, London, by members of the Balcombe Street Gang, both of whom were Irish Republican Army volunteers.
10 April 1977	Kadhi Abdullah al-Hagri, former prime minister of North Yemen		Killed in London along with his wife Fatimah and Abdullah Ali al Hammami, minister plenipotentiary of the Yemen Arab Republic embassy in London.
7 September 1978	Georgi Markov, Bulgarian dissident		Died in London after being attacked with ricin fired from a gun disguised as an umbrella on Waterloo Bridge by suspected KGB agents.
9 July 1978	Abdul Razak al-Naif, former Prime Minister of Iraq	Salem Ahmed Hassan and Sadoun Shakir	Killed in London on the orders of Saddam Hussein.
30 March 1979	Airey Neave, Conservative Member of Parliament for Abingdon and Shadow Secretary of State for Northern Ireland	INLA	Car bombing outside Palace of Westminster, by members of the Irish National Liberation Army
5 June 1980	John Turnley, SDLP and Irish Independence Party politician	Ulster Defence Association	Killed on the way to a political meeting.
26 June 1980	Miriam Daly, civil rights activist, in charge of the INLA prisoners' welfare.	Ulster Defence Association	Members of the UDA had gained entry to her home with the intention of killing her husband but when they learned he was not to return they shot her instead.
15 October 1980	Ronnie Bunting, Irish National Liberation Army leader and founding member	Ulster Defence Association	Killed in his home alongside his wife (Suzanne Bunting) and another man (Noel Lyttle).
21 January 1981	Sir Norman Stronge, aristocrat and Northern Irish politician, and his son, Sir James Stronge, aristocrat and Northern Irish politician	Provisional Irish Republican Army	Killed at their ancestral home, Tynan Abbey in County Armagh, which was then set on fire.
14 November 1981	Robert Bradford, Unionist Member of Parliament for Belfast South	IRA	Murdered during a speech at Finaghy, Belfast.
7 December 1983	Edgar Graham, Ulster Unionist Member of the Northern Ireland Assembly (1982)	IRA	Shot by an IRA gunman outside Queen's University Belfast.
12 October 1984	Anthony Berry, Conservative Member of Parliament for Enfield Southgate	IRA	Killed in the Brighton hotel bombing.
19 November 1987	George Seawright, Unionist Northern Ireland politician	IPLO	Killed by the Irish People's Liberation Organisation in Shankill, Belfast.
12 February 1989	Pat Finucane, solicitor	Ken Barrett	Killed in Belfast by Ulster Loyalists.
30 July 1990	Ian Gow, Conservative Member of Parliament for Eastbourne	IRA	Killed by a car bomb near his house in East Sussex.
27 December 1997	Billy Wright, Loyalist Volunteer Force leader	INLA prisoners	Killed in Maze Prison.
1 November 2006	Alexander Litvinenko, former FSB officer and critic of Russian president Vladimir Putin	Russia's FSB agents Andrei Lugovoi and Dmitry Kovtun	Acute radiation syndrome via ingestion of polonium-210. See Poisoning of Alexander Litvinenko.
16 June 2016	Jo Cox, Labour Member of Parliament for Batley and Spen	Thomas Mair	Shooting and stabbing incident before a constituency surgery. See Murder of Jo Cox.
15 October 2021	Sir David Amess, Conservative Member of Parliament for Southend West	Ali Harbi Ali	Stabbed during a constituency surgery. See Murder of David Amess.
c. 9 July 2026	Ann Widdecombe, British politician and television personality	Joshua Kerry (alleged, charged but still standing trial in a crown court)	On 10 July 2026, Devon and Cornwall Police said that Widdecombe's body had been discovered with "serious injuries".

== Ukraine ==
Year	Victim(s)	Assassin(s)	Notes
30 July 1918	Hermann von Eichhorn	Boris Donskoy	Killed by a bomb thrown at his carriage by Boris Donskoy, a member of the Left SR's.
23 January 1921	Mykola Leontovych, composer	Soviet state security agent Afanasy Grishchenko.	Shot in his home after a robbery.
24 October 1949	Yaroslav Halan, anti-fascist writer	Mykhailo Stakhur and Ilariy Lukashevych	Killed with an axe at his home office in Lviv by members of the OUN (according to the Soviet official version, ordered by the Vatican)
24–27 April 1979	Volodymyr Ivasiuk, composer		Found hanged in a forest outside of Lviv.
7 November 1993	Yuri Osmanov, Crimean Tatar civil rights activist		Brutally beaten by unidentified assailants and died the next day.
15 October 1995	Akhat Bragin, businessman and president of the Shakhtar Donetsk football club		Killed by a bomb at the Shakhtar Stadium in Donetsk.
3 November 1996	Yevhen Shcherban, People's Deputy of Ukraine		Shot dead along with his wife and bodyguard while departing a plane at Donetsk International Airport.
22 April 1998	Vadym Hetman, former chairman of the National Bank of Ukraine		Shot by a contract killer in Kyiv.
17 September 2000	Georgiy Gongadze, journalist	Agents of the Ministry of Internal Affairs	Disappeared, found decapitated and doused in dioxine 2 months later near Tarashcha.
29 November 2005	Stepan Senchuk, former governor of Lviv Oblast		Shot while in his car.
26 July 2014	Oleh Babaiev, Mayor of Kremenchuk		Shot in front of his home.
13 April 2015	Serhiy Sukhobok, journalist		shot in a dacha in Kyiv.
15 April 2015	Oleg Kalashnikov, former Peoples Deputy of Ukraine		Killed in his home in Kyiv.
16 April 2015	Oles Buzina, pro-Russian writer		Shot near his home in Kyiv.
23 May 2015	Aleksey Mozgovoy, commander in Luhansk People's Republic, leader of the pro-Russian Prizrak Brigade, murderer for hire		Killed in an ambush of his motorcade on the road between Luhansk and Alchevsk, near the village of Mykhailivka, Perevalsk Raion.
20 July 2016	Pavel Sheremet, Belarusian journalist		Died in a car explosion in Kyiv.
16 October 2016	Arsen Pavlov, Russian militant, leader of the Sparta Battalion, war criminal.		Killed alongside his bodyguard by an IED explosion in his apartment's elevator in Donetsk.
8 February 2017	Mikhail Tolstykh, Ukrainian separatist officer wanted for war crimes, commander of the Somalia Battalion		Killed while working in his Donetsk office by an explosion said to be caused by an RPO-A Shmel rocket launcher.
23 March 2017	Denis Voronenkov, former member of the State Duma of the Russian Federation	Pavel Parshov, veteran of Ukraine's volunteer battalion.	Shot dead in Kyiv while on his way to meet a fellow exiled parliamentarian, Ilya Ponomarev.
27 June 2017	Maksym Shapoval, Intelligence officer and head of the special forces of the Chief Directorate of Intelligence of the Ministry of Defence of Ukraine		Killed in a car bombing in Kyiv
31 August 2018	Alexander Zakharchenko, pro-Russian separatist and Head of the Donetsk People's Republic, concurrent Prime Minister of the Donetsk People's Republic		Killed in a bomb explosion in a cafe in Donetsk
3 August 2021	Vitaly Shishov, exiled Belarusian dissident		Found hanging in a forest after being reported missing the previous day
2 March 2022	Volodymyr Struk, Mayor of Kreminna		Abducted and killed during the 2022 Russian invasion of Ukraine
7 March 2022	Yuriy Prylypko, Mayor of Hostomel	Russian military	Killed during the 2022 Russian invasion of Ukraine
24 March 2022	Olga Sukhenko, Village Head of Motyzhyn	Russian military	Killed during the Russian occupation of Bucha
24 August 2022	Ivan Sushko, Russian-appointed head of Mykhailivka in Zaporizhzhia Oblast		Killed in a car bombing during the Russian occupation of Zaporizhzhia Oblast.
28 August 2022	Oleksiy Kovalov, Member of the Verkhovna Rada	Ukrainian partisans	Shot during an attack on his residence in Zaliznyi Port.
19 July 2024	Iryna Farion, linguist, politician, and former People's Deputy of Ukraine		Shot by an unknown assailant in the head in Lviv, pending investigation.
14 March 2025	Demyan Hanul, activist and member of the Right Sector		Shot in Odesa.
30 August 2025	Andriy Parubiy, former chairman of the Verkhovna Rada	Unknown	Assassination of Andriy Parubiy

== See also ==
- List of assassinations
- List of people who survived assassination attempts
