= Murder of Gasanguseynovy brothers =

Murder in Russia

The murder of the Gasanguseinov brothers
- Location: Dagestan, Russia
- Date: 23 August 2016
- Deaths: 2
- Victims: Gasanguseyn Gasanguseynov; Nabi Gasanguseynov

The murder of brothers Gasanguseyn Gasanguseynov and Nabi Gasanguseynov occurred on August 23, 2016, near the village of Goor-Khindakh in the Shamilsky District of Dagestan.

The victims of the murder were two brothers, Gasanguseyn and Nabi, who worked as shepherds. At the time of the killing, they were 19 and 17 years old, respectively. They were shot during a special operation conducted by law enforcement agencies of the Republic of Dagestan: SOG-5 of the Federal Security Service Directorate for Dagestan, the Center for Countering Extremism of the Ministry of Internal Affairs for Dagestan, the Federal Security Service of Russia, and the Department of the Ministry of Internal Affairs for the Shamil District.

== Biography of the brothers ==
The brothers Gasanguseyn (commonly called Hasan) and Nabi Gasanguseynov were born and raised in the village of Khindakh, part of the Goor rural settlement in the Shamil District of Dagestan, in the family of laborers Murtazali and Patimat Gasanguseynov. At the time of their murder, Hasan was 19 years old, making him two years older than his brother Nabi.

The boys had contrasting personalities: Hasan was gentle, measured, and calm, while Nabi was energetic, cheerful, and restless. Hasan had finished school, while Nabi left after the 9th grade to work alongside his brother to support their family. Both their parents were disabled. The family also included a younger sister, who was in the 7th grade at the time of the events.

The family of five mainly lived on the parents' disability benefits. The brothers worked as shepherds, earning about 59,000 rubles (approx. 1000$) for 4–5 months of work, typically during the season from late April to September.

== Circumstances of the murder ==
On August 23, 2016, the brothers—19-year-old Gasanguseyn and 17-year-old Nabi — were herding livestock at the Lagadib hamlet, 3–4 km from their village. Gasanguseyn tended to cattle, while his younger brother Nabi looked after the calves. That evening, after driving the livestock into pens, the brothers called their mother, asked her to fry fish for dinner, and started heading back to the village. However, they never arrived, and they did not answer their mother’s calls. Worried, she raised the alarm, and relatives began searching for them.

Around six in the morning, their uncle, Israpil Magomedov, found the brothers’ bodies discarded in bushes along the path to the pasture. Gasanguseyn and Nabi were lying face down, barefoot. Their bodies had been moved off the trail and thrown under bushes by the roadside, and bloodstains at the scene had been covered with sand. They were wearing oversized jackets that no one in the family recognized.

When the bodies were prepared for burial, it was revealed that Gasan had suffered eight gunshot wounds, and Nabi eleven, while the jackets had only two bullet holes each. Near the bodies, assault rifles, backpacks, and military boots were found, but the brothers' usual slippers were lying nearby. Magomedov called the villagers, and a crowd quickly gathered at the site of the shepherds’ execution. By then, police had also arrived with stretchers to retrieve the bodies.

The police took the bodies, citing orders from their superiors. Villagers from Khindakh, as well as nearby villages Kahib and Goor, which are part of the same rural community, demanded to know when the bodies would be returned, as Islamic customs require burial on the day of death before sunset. However, the police, seemingly unaware of the situation's complexity, said the bodies would be returned after investigative procedures at the department.

News of the shepherds' murder spread rapidly, stirring unrest in nearby villages. The boys were well known to everyone. Men gathered at the district center, where the police had taken the bodies. It soon became clear that the authorities did not plan to return the bodies but intended to transport them to Makhachkala "for further investigative actions." This phrase was understood to mean that the bodies would never be returned—deceased "militants" are buried anonymously in numbered graves at a cemetery near Makhachkala.

Upon realizing this, the villagers marched to the district center and gathered at the Shamil District Police Department building. There, they broke through the gates and forcibly took the brothers’ bodies from the police.

== General information about the crime ==
On the day of the murders, Police Major Ibragim Aliev, acting head of the Shamil District Department of Internal Affairs, reported that during operational search activities in the villages of Goor-Khindakh and Kahib, unidentified individuals had opened fire on law enforcement officers. According to his statement, the attackers were killed by return fire. Based on this account, criminal cases were initiated under Articles 222 and 317 of the Russian Criminal Code: “attempt on the life of law enforcement officers” and “illegal possession and carrying of weapons” against unidentified individuals.

The victims' families were told that the brothers were militants and were involved in several crimes in the area, including the arson of a school in the village of Teletl, the bombing of a television tower in the village of Khebda, and the murder of Federal Judge Ubaydula Magomedov from the village of Assab in the Shamil District.

The investigation collected materials, including a genetic examination that was supposed to confirm that the brothers had fired automatic weapons. These materials were included in the 23 volumes compiled for the case against the "militants." However, these case files lacked any information about the law enforcement officers involved, such as the names of units or other details.

In January 2017, the brothers’ father, Murtazali Gasan Guseynov, filed a petition with the investigative authorities demanding a criminal case be opened regarding the murder. For a long time, the authorities refused. Only in late March did the Prosecutor of Dagestan acknowledge that there was no evidence to classify the brothers as militants and referred the materials for further review. By the end of 2017, the criminal cases against the brothers were dismissed, and a new case was opened under Article 105 of the Criminal Code (“Murder”), with Murtazali Gasan Guseynov formally recognized as a victim.

Officials from the Ministry of Internal Affairs stated that no special operation was conducted in the Shamil District on that day. The FSB also confirmed that they had not carried out any operations on August 23, 2016.

Before the murder case was opened in November 2017, the official position of the investigative authorities was that the brothers had been killed by law enforcement officers. However, the new criminal case was initiated against unidentified individuals.

In late March 2018, the new Prosecutor of Dagestan, Denis Popov, demanded that materials related to Major Ibragim Aliev be reviewed separately. It was Aliev who, on August 23, 2016, had provided false information about the special operation, which misled the investigation for more than a year, causing it to pursue cases against the murdered brothers instead.

The uniqueness of the Gasanguseinov case is that this is the first case in Dagestan in which a criminal case was opened after a special operation on the murder of the victims of the special operation.

== Memorial actions ==
The parents of the murdered brothers regularly come out to the central square of Makhachkala to demand a meeting with the republic's leadership . They demand "clearing the good name of their sons", an official apology from the republic's leadership and the heads of the security agencies, as well as an impartial investigation and punishment of those guilty of this crime.

The parents are trying to get approval for a rally of mass support for a fair investigation into the murder of their sons. The family's lawyer regularly submits applications for approval, but the Ministry of Justice refuses, citing the holding of a fair on the dates specified in the application, at the location specified in the application. As of March 7, 2020, 57 official refusals have been received.

On October 1, 2018, according to various estimates, between three hundred and five hundred people gathered for an unauthorized rally on the main square of Makhachkala in front of the government building. The action was peaceful, and law enforcement agencies did not disperse or detain people. During the rally, the head of the Ministry of Internal Affairs of Dagestan, Abdurashid Magomedov, promised to meet with the parents of the murdered brothers. However, according to him, this was the first time he had heard that the brothers could have been killed by law enforcement officers and categorically rejected this version. As a result of this action, the parents of the murdered brothers managed to obtain a meeting with the head of the Dagestan Investigative Department of the Investigative Committee of the Russian Federation, Sergei Dubrovin, and the next day the case was transferred to the Investigative Committee of Russia.

In February 2019, a memorial stone was erected at the site of the murder, near the village of Goor-Khindakh. Water supply was also installed at the site.

== Reaction to murder ==
The brutality and cynicism of this crime, along with the subsequent actions of law enforcement, deeply resonated with the people of Dagestan. In the first days following the incident, the topic became one of the most discussed in social media groups. In addition to angry messages directed at law enforcement, many comments reflected a belief that the case would be "swept under the rug" and that "the system never turns on its own or admits mistakes." Numerous users also expressed condolences to the victims' parents. However, the information rarely reached beyond social media.

Only a few outlets, mainly those considered opposition-leaning—*Meduza*, *Novaya Gazeta*, and *Kavkaz Realii*—covered the high-profile case. At various times, public figures, including journalist Maxim Shevchenko and activist Sajid Sajidov, attempted to engage in the investigation. However, they were unable to generate significant public resonance around the murder that could serve as a catalyst for an independent investigation.

The situation began to shift approximately two years later. In October 2018, following an unsanctioned rally in Makhachkala, the case was transferred to the central office of the Investigative Committee of Russia. Subsequently, in December 2018, during a live broadcast, journalist Elena Yeskina from GTRK Dagestan asked Russian President Vladimir Putin to assist with the case. Following this appeal, according to the family’s lawyer, Jambulat Gasanov, there were signs of progress in the investigation: new details emerged, and media interest increased.

== Progress of the investigation ==
- On August 23, 2016, Acting Head of the Department of Internal Affairs for the Shamilsky District, Police Major Ibrahim Aliyev, reported that during operational and investigative activities in the villages of Goor-Khindakh and Kahib, unidentified individuals opened fire on law enforcement officers. They were killed by return fire.
- On August 29, 2016, the President of the Republic of Dagestan, Ramazan Abdulatipov, wrote on his Instagram page that the prosecutor of the republic was keeping this case under personal control and promised that over time all questions would be answered. Investigator Magomedov of the Republican Investigative Committee initiated criminal cases under Article 222 of the Russian Criminal Code and Article 317 of the Russian Criminal Code: "Attempt on the life of law enforcement officers" and "Illegal possession and carrying of weapons" against unidentified persons.
- On November 11, 2016, the criminal case under Article 317 of the Russian Criminal Code, "Attempt on the life of law enforcement officers," was transferred to the Investigative Directorate of the Investigative Committee of Russia in Dagestan.
- On January 31, 2017, the father of the killed brothers filed a petition with the investigative authorities demanding the initiation of a criminal case for murder. It was later revealed that the Investigative Committee refused to open a criminal case.
- On March 23, 2017, the father of the murdered brothers, through the court, managed to obtain a ruling to eliminate violations committed by the Investigative Committee. The Prosecutor of Dagestan acknowledged that there was "no evidence" that the murdered brothers were militants.
- On November 13, 2017, the European Court of Human Rights (ECHR) received a complaint from representatives of Murtazali Gasanov. In the complaint, the representatives of the father of the shot shepherds claimed violations of Articles 2 (Right to Life), 13 (Right to an Effective Remedy), and 8 (Right to Respect for Private and Family Life) of the Convention for the Protection of Human Rights and Fundamental Freedoms.
- On November 29, 2017, it became known that the investigation had closed the case under Article 317. A new criminal case was initiated under Article 105 of the Russian Criminal Code — "Murder," and the father of the brothers, Murtazali Gasanov, was recognized as a victim. Since the end of January 2017, the interests of the Gasanov family have been represented by new lawyers working under a contract with the Memorial Human Rights Center.
- On March 27, 2018, the new prosecutor of the republic, Denis Popov, demanded the allocation of materials regarding Acting Head of the Department of Internal Affairs for the Shamilsky District, Police Major Ibrahim Aliyev, who had provided false information.
- On June 5, 2018, the European Court of Human Rights communicated Murtazali Gasanov's complaint. It requested that the Russian government provide copies of all materials from the preliminary investigation into the circumstances of the Gasanov brothers' deaths, all materials from cases initiated on those events, and specifically copies of all refusals to initiate criminal cases, decisions to close investigations, and rulings on appeals of these decisions. The government was also asked to provide a chronological list of all measures taken in each criminal case and submit this information by October 4, 2018. The district police chief, Ibrahim Aliyev, was reassigned as a precinct officer in the Khunzakhsky District.
- On October 2, 2018, the case of the brothers' murder was removed from the Republican Investigative Committee and transferred to Moscow: By order of the Deputy Chairman of the Investigative Committee of the Russian Federation, the criminal case initiated on the grounds of crimes under subparagraphs "a" and "g" of Part 2 of Article 105 of the Russian Criminal Code (murder of two or more persons, committed by a group of persons) for the murder of Nabi Gasanov and Gasan Gasanov was removed from the Investigative Directorate of the Investigative Committee of the Russian Federation in the Republic of Dagestan and transferred to the central office of the Investigative Committee of Russia for further investigation.
- On October 7, 2018, the parents of the murdered brothers and their lawyer, Jambulat Gasanov, held a press conference at the House of Journalists in Moscow and presented a report containing all known facts related to the case.
- On December 20, 2018, during a press conference, journalist Elena Yeskina from GTRK Dagestan asked Russian President Vladimir Putin about the murder and requested help to finally resolve the case. Putin responded that he was hearing about the case for the first time and promised to address the issue, instructing Alexander Bastrykin, the Head of the Investigative Committee of Russia, to take charge of the case.
- On March 10, 2020, the Investigative Committee once again refused to initiate a criminal case against the former Chief of the Department of Internal Affairs for the Shamilsky District, Ibrahim Aliyev.

== See also ==
- Human rights in Russia
- List of assassinations in Europe § Russia
- List of unsolved murders (2000–present)
- Three Billboards Outside Ebbing, Missouri
