= Vartkes Serengülian =

Armenian politician and social activist (1871 - 1915)

Vartkes Serengulian
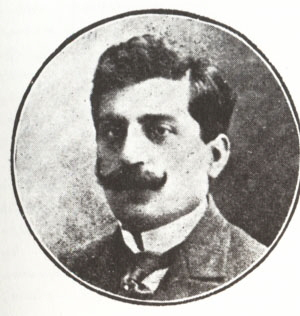
- Born: 1871; Erzurum, Ottoman Empire
- Died: 1915 (aged 43–44); Urfa
- Occupations: Politician; activist

Vartkes Serengülian (Armenian: Վարդգէս Սէրէնկիւլեան; also known as Hovhannes Armenian: Յովհաննէս or Gisak; 1871, in Erzurum – 1915, in Urfa) was an Ottoman Armenian political and social activist, and a member of the Ottoman Parliament.

== Biography ==
He studied in the Ardzinian and Sanasarian colleges of Karin (Erzurum). In late 1880s he organized demonstrations in Karin and was arrested. After he was released in 1892 he worked in Constantinople, then in Bulgaria and the Russian Empire as a revolutionary activist. In Van, Serengyulian supported the ideas of Hrayr Dzhoghk, and cooperated with the Armenakan Party. He was arrested in Van and in 1901 was sentenced to a 101-year prison sentence. The Armenian Revolutionary Federation (ARF) reportedly attempted to organize a prison break for him in the beginning of 1908. In the same year, after the Young Turk Revolution he was released from prison and elected as a member of the Ottoman parliament representing the ARF. As an MP he advocated the creation of trade unions within the Ottoman Empire and, spoke out against the atrocities perpetrated against the Armenian population in Adana. He had also several disputes with an other deputy known for his feeling hostile to the Armenians, Aziz Feyzi Pirinççizade. On the 2 June 1915 he was arrested together with the other Armenian deputy in Constantiople, Krikor Zohrab. They were deported to Urfa, where they were killed by Cherkes Ahmet.
