= Valde Hirvikanta =

Finnish politician

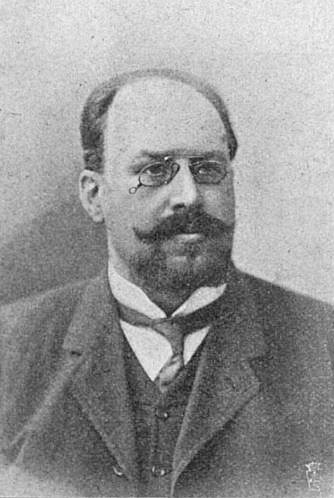
Valde Hirvikanta

Valde Hirvikanta (originally von Hellens) (17 March 1863, Turku – 2 October 1911, Turku) was a conservative Finnish politician of the Finnish Party. He was briefly the procurator of Finland in 1905 and the president of Turku Court of Appeal in 1911. He was also a member of the Parliament of Finland from 1909 to 1910. He belonged to the nobility.

== Early life and education ==
Hirvikanta was born in Turku to Lars Theodor von Hellens, president of the Court of Appeal and a long-time senator, and his wife Maria Sofia Aminoff. He matriculated from Turun Lyseo in 1880, earned a Bachelor of Philosophy in 1885 and a Bachelor of Law in 1888, and qualified as a vice-judge (varatuomari) in 1890. The following year he was appointed secretary of the Turku Cathedral Chapter.

== Career ==
A supporter of the “compliant” faction during the first period of Russification, Hirvikanta was named councillor of the Turku Court of Appeal in 1903 after several judges had been dismissed for refusing to hear a political misconduct case.

In May 1905 he became procurator of the Senate following the assassination of Eliel Soisalon-Soininen. In that post he defended members of the Red Guard arrested after the Viapori Mutiny the same year.

The nationwide general strike of November 1905 forced the Senate to resign, and Hirvikanta returned to legal practice in Turku. He was elected to Parliament in 1909 for the southern district of Turku.

During the second period of Russification he was appointed vice-president (1910) and, in early 1911, president of the Court of Appeal of Turku. A civic leader in the city, he sat on the Turku City Council, chaired the Kuusisto municipal assembly and helped found the Finnish-language daily Uusi Aura.

== Assassination ==
On the evening of 2 October 1911, 24-year-old shop assistant Bruno Forsström shot Hirvikanta twice as he stepped from the rear door of his residence at Yliopistonkatu 29, Turku, on his way to the sauna, then turned the revolver on himself. Forsström died in hospital shortly afterwards.

== Family ==
Hirvikanta was one of twelve children. His siblings included hygiene professor Oskar von Hellens, Major-General Lars Hjalmar von Hellens, member of parliament and mayor Harald Wilhelm von Hellens and multi-portfolio cabinet minister Albert von Hellens.
