= Cherkes Ahmet =

Ottoman mass murderer (died 1915)

- Born: Serres, Ottoman Empire
- Died: September 6, 1915; Damascus, Ottoman Syria, Ottoman Empire
- Cause of death: Execution by hanging
- Convictions: Premeditated mass murder Robbery
- Penalty: Death

Cherkes Ahmet (died September 6, 1915) was the leader of the Ottoman Empire's state-sponsored paramilitary marauders of supposedly Circassian origin during World War I. Cherkes Ahmet was from Serres, Macedonia. He was notoriously responsible for the murder of the well-known Armenian writer, literary critic and politician Krikor Zohrab and politician Vartkes Serengülian during the Armenian genocide. Ahmet supported the Committee of Union and Progress during the coup d'état of January 1913 following which he became a leading member of the Special Organization in Van, where he was given the responsibility of subduing the Armenian population by Cevdet Bey, the Governor of Van at the time. Ahmet, along with fellow murderers Halil and Nazim, were tried and executed in Damascus by Djemal Pasha in September 1915. The assassinations became the subject of a 1916 investigation by the Ottoman Parliament led by Artin Boshgezenian, the deputy for Aleppo.

While Ahmet was officially executed for murder and robbery, the real reason for his execution was that he was considered a future liability. This was especially relevant, given the recent coup d'état.
