= Radoljub Kanjevac =

Radoljub "Rade" Kanjevac (1971, in Niš, SFR Yugoslavia – 1 July 2006 in Nis, Serbia) was a Serbian art collector, gangster and a mob boss, who survived three assassination attempts but was killed in a fourth attack.

== Background ==
He was raised in the neighbourhood of Komren in the northern outskirts of Niš. Kanjevac was arrested in 1997 and in 1999 for street fighting. He was acquitted on both occasions, having had no weapons found in his possession. The police accused him of being one of the leaders of the "Kanjevac Brothers" criminal gang, involved in robbery, extortion, loan sharking, and racketeering. The gang was known for acts of violence, ranging from bullying to extreme brutality. Kanjevac denied these accusations, claiming via the news media that he was actually an art collector.

He was a three-time defendant against charges of property crimes. In 2003, in the wake of the assassination of premier Zoran Đinđić, as part of the Sablja police action (Operation Sabre, the large scale detention of everyone suspected of possible connection to organized crime), he was arrested on suspicion of burglary. He was later released by the court because of lack of evidence.

A few days before his death, he had come under legal scrutiny again, on suspicion of blackmail to collect a debt.

== Assassination attempts ==
Kanjevac survived three initial assassination attempts, and died in a fourth attack.

On 15 September 2002, Kanjevac and his companion, Igor Petrović (Petra), were shot at the cafe "Blu" on St. Sava Square in the Bulevar Nemanjića neighborhood of Niš. The police arrested Nenad Petrović, also known as Peša Bokser, who was an alleged member of a rival gang, but he was later released by the court because of lack of evidence.

On 24 October 24 2002, a bomb at the entrance to Kanjevac's apartment exploded, activated as he approached. He survived with minor injuries to the head, arms and legs. The police arrested Nišlija Milan Šević, an alleged member of a rival gang. Šević was found guilty at trial, despite Kanjevac testifying at trial that he did not believe Šević tried to kill him.

On 28 October 2004, a bomb exploded under his car in Nikole Pašića Street, near Kalča. Kanjevac received injuries to his hips, buttocks and legs, but he survived again. No responsible party was ever identified.

== Death ==
On 1 July 2006, Kanjevac was hit and killed by three of seven shots fired as he was getting out of his parked car on Božidara Adžije Street in Niš. Once again, whoever was responsible was never identified.
