= List of members of the Special Organization of the Ottoman Empire =

The Special Organization, a secret paramilitary organization tied to the Committee of Union and Progress (CUP), the ruling party of the Ottoman Empire, included the following members according to an interview with its former leader Eşref Kuşçubaşı by U.S. INR officer Philip H. Stoddard:

| Agent | Activity |
|---|---|
| Enver Pasha | |
| Süleyman Askerî Bey | |
| Kuşçubaşızâde Eşref Bey | |
| Hussein Rauf Bey (Orbay) | |
| Çerkes Ethem | |
| Abdulaziz es Senussi | |
| Dr. Esad Bey (Işık) | |
| Husam al-Din Bey (Ertürk) | |
| Mehmed Akif Bey (Ersoy) | |
| Cezayirli Emir Ali | |
| Kel Ali Bey (Çetinkaya) | |
| Ali Fethi Bey (Okyar) | |
| Zenci Musa | |
| Aziz Ali Bey (al-Misri) | |
| Nuri Bey (Killigil) | |
| Ahmed Fuad Bey (Bulca) | |
| Lieutenant Islam Bey | |
| Mustafa Kemal Bey (Atatürk) | Organized militias in the Italo-Turkish War |
| Mehmed Nuri Bey (Conker) | |
| Dr. Refik Bey (Saydam) | |
| Çerkes Reşit | |
| Yakub Cemil | |
| Mithat Şükrü Bleda | |
| Cherkes Ahmet | Perpetrator of the Armenian genocide, execute during a purge in 1915 |
| Dr. Behaeddin Shakir | One of the main perpetrators of the Armenian genocide, assassinated by Aram Yerganian on the 17 April 1922 in Berlin |
| Eyub Sabri Bey (Akgöl) | Agitated among Albanians in the Balkans with acts of subversion committed in Macedonia and Albania |
| Fuad Bey (Balkan) | |
| Lieutenant Hilmi Musallimi | Commander of the Kurdish forces during the 1915 Suez Canal Operation; Said Halim Paşa's secretary |
| Ismail Canbulat | |
| Infantry officer Rasuhi Bey | Mustafa Kemal's adjutant during early republican era |
| Filibeli Ahmed Hilmi Bey | |
| Sharif Bourguiba | |
| Ibn al-Rashid | |
