= Osmancık Battalion (Ottoman Empire) =

Volunteer military battalion in WWI

- Tabur-ı Osmancık
- Active: 1914–1915
- Disbanded: 1915
- Country: Ottoman Empire
- Allegiance: Iraq Area Command
- Branch: Infantry
- Type: Volunteer Battalion
- Role: Irregular warfare, internal security, counter-insurgency
- Size: Battalion level
- Part of: Teşkilât-ı Mahsûsa
- Place of establishment: Istanbul (formation)
- Nickname: Fedayeen Battalion
- Engagements: World War I; Mesopotamian campaign

Commanders
- Founding commander: Süleyman Askerî

The Osmancık Battalion was a volunteer military unit established under the umbrella of the Teşkilât-ı Mahsûsa (Special Organization) in the Ottoman Empire during World War I, organized specifically for irregular warfare operations. The battalion was formed in late 1914 under the leadership of Süleyman Askerî Bey and was deployed in various operations against the British occupation, primarily in the Iraq Front. Established to support Ottoman regular forces particularly during the battles of Basra, Qurna, Rotah, and Shaiba, the Battalion sought to impede the British advance through guerrilla tactics, intelligence gathering, and psychological warfare techniques.

The decision to establish the battalion followed the British landing at Fao in November 1914, the subsequent occupation of Basra, and their advance toward Qurna at the confluence of the Euphrates and Tigris. To overcome the insufficiency of regular forces at the front, the Ottoman General Staff planned the formation of "fedayeen" (commando) units attached to the Special Organization; accordingly, the Osmancık Battalion was dispatched to Basra. Operating under the leadership of Süleyman Askerî Bey, this unit consisted of volunteer officers who had previously served in irregular warfare in Libya and the Balkans, along with elite personnel dedicated to the cause of dedicated volunteers. The battalion faced its first major engagement at the Battle of Rotah, subsequently sustaining significant casualties during the Battle of Shaiba in 1915.

The failure of the Battle of Shaiba, the dispersal of tribal levies, and deteriorating morale led to a profound disillusionment for Süleyman Askerî Bey, resulting in his suicide on April 14, 1915. Following this event, the Osmancık Battalion was de facto disbanded; however, the tradition it established continued to inspire Special Organization operations in other theaters. The Osmancık Battalion and Süleyman Askerî Bey’s command became symbolic in later Turkish military historiography as examples of volunteer irregular warfare and personal sacrifice in the Mesopotamian Campaign.

== History ==
=== Factors related to the establishment of the Osmancık Battalion ===
In the late 19th and early 20th centuries, inter-state competition intensified over Middle Eastern territories including the ancient Ottoman provinces of Basra, Baghdad, and Mosul. These lands, containing rich oil resources, held immense strategic and geopolitical significance. As a primary objective for Great Powers, the Iraqi region attracted substantial British interest due to its position on the routes connecting the Middle East to the Far East. During World War I, the British acted systematically to seize the region, designating the operation as the Mesopotamian Campaign.

Prior to the Ottoman Empire's entry into the war, Britain had begun concentrating forces in the Persian Gulf. This British initiative reflected their strategic foresight regarding the course of the war. Consequently, the Ottoman Empire, lacking sufficient troop strength in the Iraq theater, was unable to prevent the British advance toward Basra following their landing at Fao Island with troops brought from India in November 1914. During engagements on December 4 and 7, 1914, Ottoman forces were compelled to retreat, and several officers and enlisted men, including the commander of the 38th Division, Colonel Suphi Bey, were taken prisoner. The remaining units retreated in a fragmented state. Encountering little resistance, the British first captured Basra and continued their offensive to seize Qurna, at the junction of the Euphrates and Tigris, on December 9. Furthermore, they engaged in efforts to incite Arab tribes against the Ottoman state.

Broadly considered, the Mesopotamian campaign was viewed as a critical theater by the British, who planned the capture of Baghdad within the prevailing regional and global conjuncture. British success in this theater would restrict German influence in Persia, prevent Arab tribal uprisings against British interests, extend aid to their Russian allies, repair their prestige damaged by the Gallipoli Campaign, and weaken Ottoman standing among Muslim Arabs. Throughout 1915, within the framework of the Mesopotamian Campaign aimed at Baghdad, the British occupied these regions after winning the battles of Qurna, Shaiba, Amarah, Nasiriyah, and Kut-al-Amara. As the situation on the Iraq Front became increasingly critical, Ottoman authorities were forced to deploy further reinforcements to halt the British advance.

Alarmed by the British northward progression, the Ottoman General Staff (Ottoman Turkish: Erkân-ı Harbiye-i Umûmiye Riyaseti) dispatched Süleyman Askerî Bey to the region. Subsequently, the "Osmancık" Battalion, part of the Teşkilât-ı Mahsûsa units from the Caucasus Campaign, was transferred to the theater. Additionally, the organization of local tribes was prioritized. The Iraq Front remained a highly complex theater, where combat continued until the end of the war despite intermittent lulls. Both the Ottoman and British commands underwent frequent leadership changes; following Cavit Pasha, commanders such as Süleyman Askerî, Nureddin Bey, and Halil Bey were dispatched to the region.

=== Operations ===
Süleyman Askerî Bey fundamentally believed that success in Iraq could be achieved through guerrilla warfare conducted by local tribes and mujahideen rather than regular army operations. He was a renowned expert in guerrilla tactics. Having fought successfully against the Italians in Benghazi, he had also moved to Western Thrace in 1913 during the second phase of the Balkan Wars—after the initial defeat and the subsequent recovery of Edirne—where he established a robust government and organization, creating an environment for the peaceful coexistence of Turks until the Ottoman-Bulgarian peace treaty. At the outbreak of World War I, while returning to Istanbul from Macedonia, he stopped in Sofia and met with Mustafa Kemal Atatürk, who was serving as Military Attaché. Atatürk, identifying the Iraq Front as the weakest point and warning of serious future consequences, requested Süleyman Askerî Bey to speak with Enver Pasha regarding his deployment there. Although Süleyman Askerî Bey agreed, Enver Pasha soon appointed him to the Iraq Front. Operating in the Persian Gulf with the "Osmancık Battalion", he conducted raids against the British army alongside tribes loyal to the Ottoman cause. His appointment as commander was driven by his past successes, his previous service in the region, his role as head of the Special Organization, and his proximity to Enver Pasha. Following the occupation of Basra, British forces advanced to capture the town of Qurna. There, Colonel Suphi Bey, commander of the 38th Division, along with 45 officers and 989 enlisted men, was taken prisoner. In response, Enver Pasha, the Minister of War and deputy commander-in-chief, dispatched the "Osmancık Battalion"—formed by Miralay Süleyman Askerî Bey (then responsible for Tribal and refugee affairs at the Ministry of Interior) and approximately 40-50 volunteer Ottoman officers from the Teşkilât-ı Mahsûsa—to the region on December 17, 1914. Süleyman Askerî Bey and his unit arrived in the theatre on December 17 and commenced operations to recapture Basra, adhering to his doctrine that local volunteer units would suffice for the struggle.

The Osmancık Battalion's first serious engagement occurred at the Battle of Rotah, which can be considered a success. Süleyman Askerî Bey aimed to advance from the north toward Qurna to expel the British entirely from Iraq. Conversely, the British commander, General Barrett, sought to draw Ottoman forces toward British artillery positions. The British primary objective was to maintain a strong stance against Ottoman assaults, prevent the dispersal of their troops, and retain the capability to launch counter-offensives. The General frequently gathered intelligence on Ottoman equipment and troop strength through scouts and collaborated with tribes nominally under Ottoman sovereignty, encouraging them to maintain a façade of loyalty to the Sultan.

No major engagements occurred until January 3, 1915. On January 7, 1915, British forces attacked the Albu Muharamet positions but were forced to withdraw due to mounting casualties. General Arthur Barrett requested reinforcements for his unit to counter potential Ottoman counter-attacks, receiving two infantry battalions and three artillery batteries, thereby strengthening his position.

On January 12, 1915, the British gunboat HMS Espiegle, accompanied by another vessel, approached within two kilometers of Shedda and opened fire. During this engagement, a steam launch carrying Major Ata, commander of the flanking forces, was sunk by enemy fire. Major Ata and his crew managed to swim to shore. The British gunboat then bombarded the left bank and the area in the direction of the Rota Canal. Ottoman artillery responded to the British assault. Unable to overcome Ottoman resistance, the British vessels withdrew toward Qurna. At this juncture, Ottoman officers moved toward the Rota Canal, establishing a fortification line bounded by the Tigris on the right and the Rota Canal on the other side.

On January 14, 1915, British forces concentrated and began deploying toward Saniye, subsequently occupying the village of Rota and Mezip Hill. Süleyman Askerî Bey successfully provoked the British into counter-attacking through small-scale harassment of their troops in Qurna. On January 16, 1915, Major Halim was appointed as detachment commander, while Captain Cemil and Captain Atıf were appointed as left and right wing commanders, respectively. The Baghdad Battalion of the 2nd Provisional Regiment was deployed on the right bank, replaced later by the Süleymaniye Mobile Gendarmerie Battalion.

Maneuvers and reconnaissance continued until January 19, 1915. British commander General Arthur Barrett instructed his troops to avoid crossing the Rota side. On January 20, 1915, Ottoman artillery opened fire on British units attacking from the left. Despite this, two British battalions continued their advance. Süleyman Askerî Bey deployed the battalion of the 26th Regiment to intercept them. While assessing the situation behind the Rota Canal, Süleyman Askerî Bey was wounded in the leg as he moved to lead an operation. Following engagements in water and marshes, the British began to withdraw, largely aided by other British units positioned at the Chifte Hills. Süleyman Askerî Bey's leg wound worsened, necessitating his transport to the Baghdad Military Hospital. In the First Battle of Rotah, enemy forces martyred Captain Cemil of Üsküdar and Captain Sefer Bey of the Osmancık Battalion and the 1st Infantry Regiment. Beyond combat, many soldiers were lost to hunger, heatstroke, and disease. In his report dated February 5, 1915, Süleyman Askerî Bey recorded 17 martyred (including two officers) and 68 wounded (including five officers), with 11 martyred and 38 wounded among tribal volunteers. British casualties were estimated at 400 dead and over 1,000 wounded.

While the leg injury hampered Süleyman Askerî Bey's movements, the Osmancık Battalion's effectiveness in the First Battle of Rotah compelled the British to retreat to Qurna. However, the martyrdom of Captain Cemil and the wounding of Askerî Bey severely affected morale, leading to command disruptions that prevented the pursuit of retreating British forces.

Süleyman Askerî Bey formulated a plan to recapture the Shatt al-Arab by splitting his forces. The central Tigris column was to fix the enemy, while the left-wing units in the Karun Valley were to divert British forces. The right-wing column was to launch an offensive from the Euphrates basin toward Basra to clear the north of Qurna.

By sinking two British vessels south of the Rota River, Ottoman forces successfully impeded British maritime logistical support. The strategy involved seizing positions near oil fields in Iraq and Persia to weaken British capabilities. The deployment of the Osmancık Battalion in the First Battle of Rotah was instrumental in the first Turkish victory of the campaign, which, despite failing to recapture Basra and Qurna, halted the British northward expansion and gained vital time for the Ottoman army.

Following Rotah, Süleyman Askerî Bey initiated the Battle of Shaiba with the intent of permanently expelling the British from Iraq. Combat began on the evening of April 11. The Euphrates group and mujahideen units advanced; British forces retreated initially due to the marshes in their rear. Tribal leaders such as Hümeyni of the Shammar and Sheikh Bedir repelled British Indian cavalry units.

On the morning of April 12, 1915, British forces encountered the Euphrates group. The British commander, anticipating the Ottoman tactical plan, initially held fire, but Ottoman units engaged, pushing British forces back to their outposts. The 104th Regiment launched an assault on British positions for approximately thirty minutes. The offensive against fortified British positions at Berjisiyye and Shaiba continued for three days but ultimately proved unsuccessful.

By the second day, more than half of the tribal volunteers had deserted, leaving the army weakened and sustaining heavy losses. On April 14, 1915, due to severe casualties, the remaining troops were forced to withdraw. Süleyman Askerî Bey was further devastated by the defection of tribal leader Uceymi Bey to the British forces.

Ottoman defensive efforts near Berjisiyye failed due to attacks from British river flotillas positioned near the Sinaf marshes. Morale collapsed, and Ottoman forces fragmented. Some Arab units turned against the Ottoman troops, looting ammunition and weapons. Ali Bey, commander of the Euphrates group, requested a withdrawal, and after three days of combat, Ottoman units retreated toward Nasiriyah.

Ottoman forces had entered the battle with 9,000 men; the commander's report to the General Staff recorded 5,028 casualties. Approximately 800 soldiers were captured. The defeat at Shaiba resulted in the total loss of Basra and its environs, which remained outside Ottoman control for the remainder of the war. During the retreat, a despairing Süleyman Askerî Bey committed suicide at the Berjisiyye woods. British General Townshend reported that the suicide occurred at Nasiriyah. Whether driven by profound grief or a sudden nervous breakdown, the betrayal by Arab tribes is considered a primary factor.

Details regarding his suicide are scarce and found mainly in memoirs. Hamza Osman, a subordinate officer, noted Askerî Bey's profound distress and described the event: "His eyes filled with tears as he threw himself onto a stretcher. He spoke harsh words to a tribal leader who had remained a spectator during the height of the battle despite being armed by the state. He ordered his aide-de-camp, Rüsuhi Bey, to prepare the carriage. As he entered, he dismissed First Lieutenant Fikri. Shortly after the carriage began to move, a gunshot was heard from within. Upon inspection, it was discovered that Süleyman Askerî Bey had committed suicide with his Nagant revolver.”

His body was transported to the headquarters at Nahila at midnight and buried in his uniform. His death affected not only his soldiers but also prominent political figures. İsmet İnönü remarked: "He remained a fiery and dynamic person until his death.” Celâl Bayar described him as a man who "did not fear death and knew nothing of personal interest... He was a powerful personality who would gladly sacrifice everything for the motherland.”

Posthumously, he was officially recognized as a martyr (şehit) by Decree No. 1040 and awarded the War Medal of Merit. On April 24, 1915, Colonel 'Sakallı' Nureddin Bey was appointed to the Iraq General Command. On the British side, General Charles Vere Ferrers Townshend replaced Barrett. Following the Battle of Shaiba, British intelligence incited uprisings against the Ottomans, particularly in Shia-populated regions, weakening Ottoman authority and increasing British control. (see Hilla uprising (1916))

== Review ==
The Ottoman Empire fought on numerous fronts during World War I, with the Mesopotamian campaign being among the most critical. Süleyman Askerî Bey and his Osmancık Battalion played a pivotal role in this theater. Prior to his academic military training, Askerî Bey had engaged in counter-guerrilla operations in Macedonia and became a prominent figure within the Committee of Union and Progress. He served as Chief of Staff for the Provisional Government of Western Thrace and was appointed by Enver Pasha to lead the Teşkilât-ı Mahsûsa. Throughout his career, he fulfilled his duties with distinction. Despite the tragic conclusion, Süleyman Askerî Bey and the Osmancık Battalion confronted the British advance in Iraq with national consciousness and courage, inflicting damage and slowing the enemy's progress. His activities significantly influenced the course of the Iraq Front. The potential outcomes had he not committed suicide remain a subject for hypothetical historical research.

== Importance ==
The Osmancık Battalion is noted in Turkish military historiography as one of the early volunteer irregular units formed under the Teşkilât-ı Mahsusa and employed in guerrilla operations during the Mesopotamian Campaign.

== Commanders ==
- Süleyman Askerî Bey – Founder and first commander

== In popular culture ==
Turkey: The unit served as the inspiration for the television series Mehmetçik Kut'ül Amare, which began airing in 2018 on the Turkish national broadcaster TRT 1.

== Bibliography ==
=== Sources ===
- Tetik, Ahmet, ed. (2004). Askerî Tarih Belgeleri Dergisi (PDF). Vol. 53. Ankara: General Staff ATASE and General Staff Inspection Presidency Publications.
- Candaş, Burak (2021). A LIFE DEDICATED TO THE SUBLIME STATE: Süleyman Askerî Bey. Tekirdağ: academia.edu.
- Fındıkçı, Mehmet Can (2023). Ottoman’s Volunteer Heroes: Osmancık. Çorum: Kut Publications. ISBN 978-625-98778-0-8.
- Şimşek, Nurettin (2018). Teşkilât-ı Mahsûsa’nın Reisi Süleyman Askerî Bey: Hayatı, Siyasî ve Askerî Faaliyetleri. Ankara: Altınordu Publications. ISBN 978-605-2028-37-7.
