= Cevat Çobanlı =

Ottoman general and War Minister of the Ottoman Empire

Cevat Çobanlı 1307 (1891)-P. 4
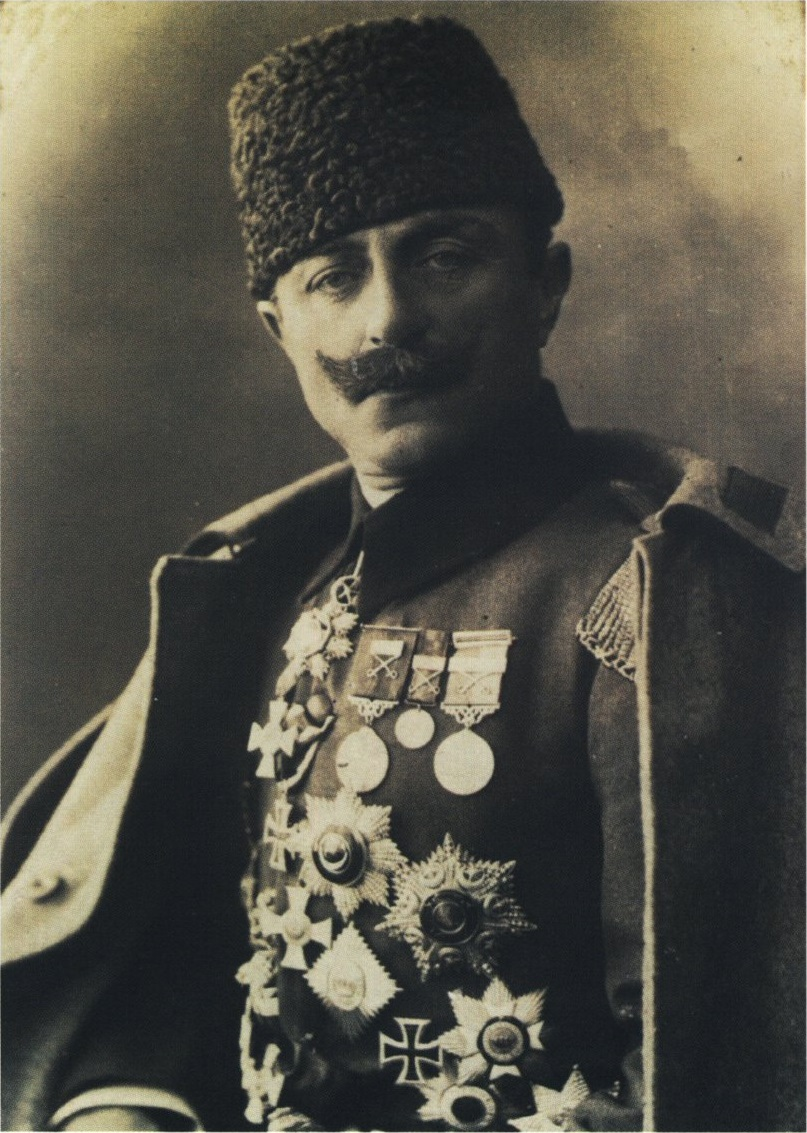
- Ministry of War
- In office 19 December 1918 – 13 January 1919
- Preceded by: Kölemen Abdullah Pasha
- Succeeded by: Ömer Yaver Paşa

Chief of the General Staff
- In office 3 November 1918 – 24 December 1918
- Preceded by: Ahmed Izzet Pasha
- Succeeded by: Fevzi Çakmak
- In office 14 May 1919 – 2 August 1919
- Preceded by: Fevzi Çakmak
- Succeeded by: Mehmed Hâdî Pasha
- In office 9 October 1919 – 16 February 1920
- Preceded by: Fuat Pasha
- Succeeded by: Shevket Turgut Pasha

Personal details
- Born: 14 September 1870 Istanbul, Ottoman Empire
- Died: 13 March 1938 (aged 67) Istanbul, Turkey
- Resting place: Turkish State Cemetery
- Education: Ottoman Military College
- Profession: Soldiers

Military service
- Allegiance: Ottoman Empire; Turkey
- Branch/service: Ottoman Army; Turkish Land Forces
- Years of service: Ottoman Empire: 1891–1920; Turkey: 15 January 1922 – 14 September 1935
- Rank: General
- Commands: Dardanelles Fortified Area Command, XIV Corps, XV Corps, XIV Corps, VIII Corps, Second Army (deputy), Eighth Army, War Minister, Chief of the General Staff, El-Cezire Front, Third Army, member of the Supreme Military Council
- Battles/wars: Balkan Wars; First Balkan War; Bulgarian Front; First Battle of Çatalca; Second Battle of Çatalca; First World War; Dardanelles campaign; Battle of 18 March; Gallipoli campaign; Eastern front; Expedition to Galicia; Sinai and Palestine campaign; Battle of Megiddo (1918); Battle of Sharon; Battle of Tulkarm; Battle of Tabsor; Battle of Arara; Battle of Samakh; Capture of Damascus (1918); Pursuit to Haritan; Turkish War of Independence; Al Jazira front
- Awards: See: § Medals and decorations

Cevat Çobanlı (14 September 1870 or 1871 – 13 March 1938) was a Turkish military commander of the Ottoman Army and a general of the Turkish Armed Forces who was notable for causing major Naval losses to the Allies during their Dardanelles campaign in World War I.

== Early life ==
Cevat was born on 14 September 1870 in Sultanahmet (Istanbul, Ottoman Empire). He belonged to the Çobanoğulları family from Arapgir. His father was Marshal Şakir Pasha, a graduate of the 2nd/21st class of the War Academy. His mother was Emine Hanım.

Cevat Pasha completed his secondary education at Galatasaray High School in Istanbul. In 1888, he entered the Ottoman Military Academy, graduating fourth in his class in 1891. He then entered the Ottoman Army as a junior infantry lieutenant. In 1892, he was promoted to the rank of First Lieutenant. In 1894, he graduated from the military college as a Staff Captain and began his service in the General Staff of the Palace as an aide-de-camp of Sultan.

In November 1894, he was promoted to lieutenant colonel. As a lieutenant colonel, he was assigned to the repair of barracks damaged by the great Istanbul earthquake of 1894. For his efforts and success in repairing military buildings, he was awarded the " Silver Medal of Merit ." In May 1895, he became a major and in August of the same year, he went to France to participate in military maneuvers. In June 1896, he received his third Order of Mecidi and in January 1897, he became a lieutenant colonel. In 1898, he received the "Order of Merit" from the Bulgarian Prince. In 1899, he went to Bulgaria and was sent to the Disarmament Conference held in The Hague that same year. He was promoted to colonel in January 1899 and to brigadier general (mirliva) in November 1901. In May 1902, he received decorations from the Spanish and German governments. In July 1904, he attended the ceremony marking the completion of the Hejaz railway from Damascus to Maan. In December 1906, he became a lieutenant general. In March 1907, he was assigned to the Second Army and returned to Istanbul in July 1907.

Cevat Bey served in the Imperial Guard during the proclamation of the Second Constitutional Era and the 31 March Incident, commanding the 2nd Division within that army. Approximately four months after the 31 March Incident, Cevat Bey's rank was reduced from brigadier general to lieutenant colonel on August 19, 1909, by the Law on Rank Demotion, which was enacted on the grounds that some commanders in the army were being promoted too quickly. Cevat Bey did not take this as a blow to pride and continued his military career. Despite his demotion, he was not considered a commander to be discarded. Indeed, immediately after the demotion, on August 28, 1909, he was appointed director of the newly opened General Staff School. He remained in this position until January 9, 1911. During this tenure, he was promoted again, rising to the rank of colonel on September 29, 1910. In July 1912, he served as Acting Deputy Chief of the General Staff; around the same time, he was given the position of Chief of Staff of the First Army Inspectorate.

== Military career ==
=== Balkan Wars ===
During the Balkan Wars, Cevat Bey served successively as Chief of Staff of the Eastern Army, Chief of Staff of the Çatalca Fortified Position and General Artillery Command (First Battle of Çatalca), and Commander of the 9th Division (Second Battle of Çatalca). He received a medal of merit due to his excellent service.

=== Dardanelles campaign ===
He was appointed as the Commander of the Çanakkale Fortified Area on November 29, 1914. During his tenure, the Turks, under his leadership, created a powerful defense to protect the strait. The defense was based on minefields, which threatened bloodshed if not properly cleared, and precluded any attempt to storm the slow-firing forts. The Turkish command also had large-calibre guns in the forts and torpedo tubes at its disposal.

Between February 25 and March 18, the Allied fleet conducted various mine-clearing and fortification-destroying operations, but their efforts proved unsuccessful. Consequently, an attempt was made to break through the strait on March 18, 1915.

The Battle of March 18 began at 10:30 AM. The first British line opened fire from Eren Köy Bay around 11:00 AM. Shortly after midday, de Robeck ordered the French line to pass and approach the forts in the strait. Although the naval fire did not destroy the Ottoman batteries, it temporarily weakened their fire. By 1:25 PM, the Ottoman fortifications were largely quiet, so de Robeck decided to withdraw the French line and advance the second British line, along with the ships Swiftsure and Majestic.

At 2:00 PM, the ship Bouvet was hit by a heavy shell in quick succession, then almost immediately struck a mine. Disappearing, the ship took with it Captain Rajo de la Touche and 638 of his crew. A total of only sixty-six men survived, picked up by the British.

The British continued their attack. Around 4:00 PM, the battleship Inflexible, having already sustained several shell hits, struck a mine near the site of the Bouvet's sinking. Ultimately, she survived only by running aground off Tenedos Island. About 10 minutes later, the Irresistible also struck a mine, while the Turks redoubled their efforts to finish her off. Fortunately, most of the crew was evacuated by the destroyer Ware.

Once they were safe, de Robeck ordered the lead ships to retreat, then at 5:50 PM, he ordered a "general recall."

As the retreat began, the Ocean, unsuccessfully attempting to tow the Irresistible, circled around, and it came as no surprise to observers when, at 6:05 PM, she too struck a mine. Once again, casualties were few, as the escorting destroyers rushed to rescue the crew. The Ocean was finally abandoned at 7:30 PM.

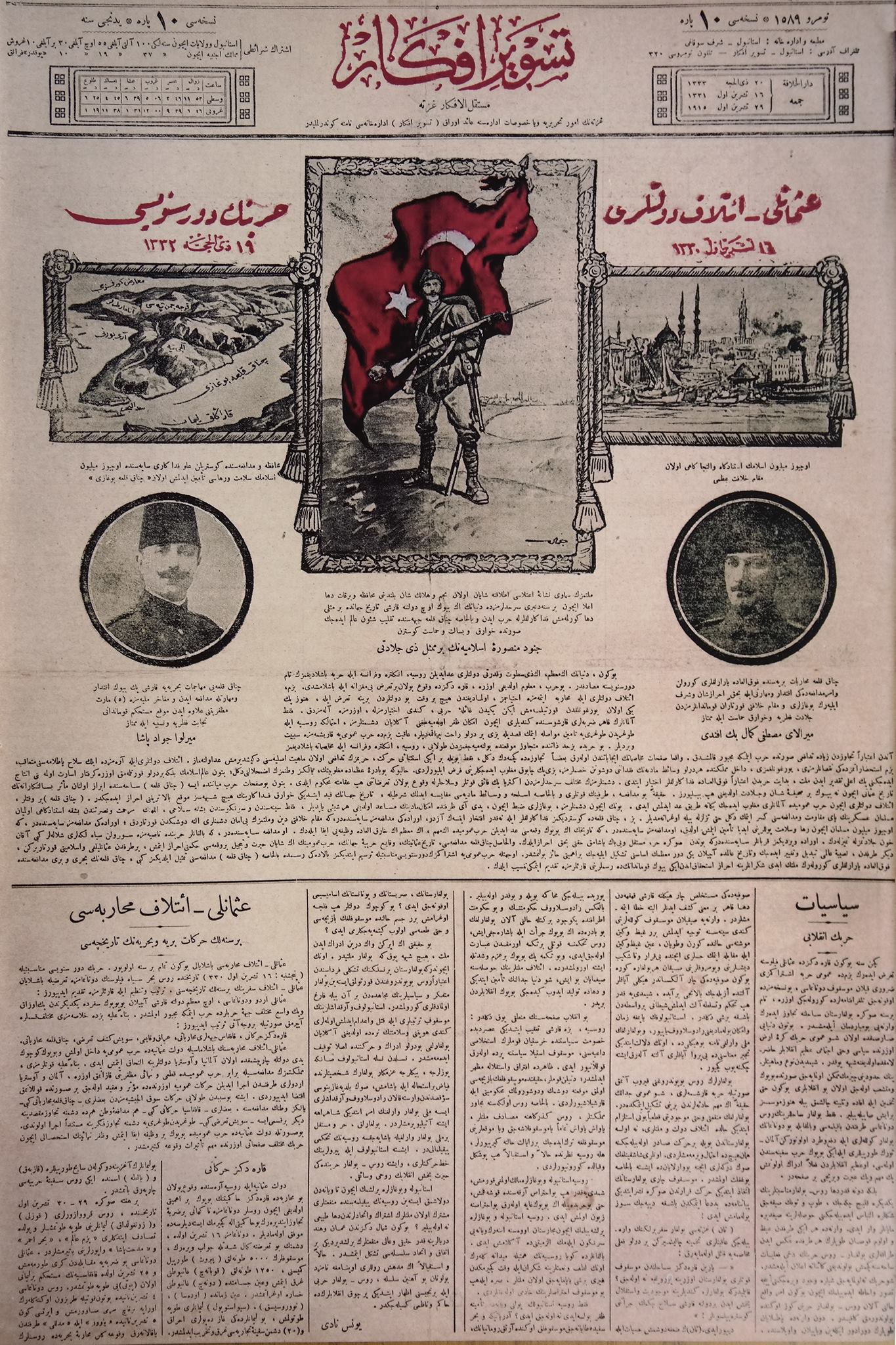
Cevat Pasha and Mustafa Kemal Bey on the daily Tasvîr-i Efkâr dated 29 October 1915.

Allied losses after the battle of March 18 amounted to approximately three battleships sunk and three more seriously damaged out of sixteen battleships, effectively losing a third of their available force. Thus, the fleet lost more ships than the Royal Navy had lost since the Battle of Trafalgar.

During the naval battles at Çanakkale Cevat Pasha demonstrated exemplary fighting ability thanks to his military strategy and planning. This success earned him the title of "Hero of March 18". As the commander of the 3rd Corps, Esat Pasha, put it further: "The first person to prevent the enemy fleet from breaking through the strait to Istanbul was Cevat Pasha" Cevat Pasha was also promoted to major general and during the victory at Çanakkale on March 18, 1915.

He was appointed as the commander of the 14th Corps towards the september of 1915 and was involved in the trench warfare that dominated the last phase of that conflict. After the successful defense of Galipoli and defeat of the Allies, he was appointed as the Group Commander of the region.

=== Expedition to Galicia ===
The XV Corps suffered heavy losses in the first weeks of fighting in Galicia, especially under its previous commander, Yakup Şevki. Therefore, the Germans raised the issue of replacing the XV Corps command with Cevat Çobanlı.

Unlike his predecessor, he knew how to act tactfully in any situation and had no aversion to the German language, which he spoke fluently. His achievements during the Dardanelles Campaign were highly respected by the Germans. Therefore, from November 18, 1916, he was appointed commander of the XV Corps.

In early November, the tactical situation on the Turkish sector of the front was so favorable that the Germans withdrew their Ledabor detachments. Large-scale Russian attacks occurred throughout December, but the Turks repulsed them without any loss of ground. Turkish casualties were around 3,000 in November and December. Overall losses for 1916 numbered 18,000: 5,000 killed, 10,000 wounded, and 3,000 captured.

Several skirmishes occurred between January-February: At 5:00 AM on January 28, the Russians launched an attack on units of the XV Corps. After attacking toward the 397th Chekilan Heights, some of the trenches fell into Russian hands but were recaptured in a counterattack. On February 17, a reconnaissance attack was launched on Chekilan Hill but was repelled. On February 25, the enemy also attempted an attack in the Chekilan area, but was unsuccessful.

On the morning of March 5, 1917, the Russians preluded a three-division attack on a part of the Turkish sector with heavy artillery bombardment. However, the Russians had launched an attack while the XV Corps occupied the very defensible high ground overlooking Zlotalpia River valley and repulsed the Russians. A similar attack was repulsed in April 1917. A period of relative calm that lasted about two weeks was broken on May 5 by intense and large-scale shelling from Russian artillery, while the enemy infantry did not fire a single shot.

The XV Corps' final battle on the Galician Front was the Russian offensive on June 19. On the very first day, Turkish positions came under intense artillery fire. Just before the offensive, the Russians again deployed gas. The fierce fighting that continued in this sector for several days was expected to unfold according to a similar scenario. In total, the Tsarist troops lost approximately thirteen thousand men in the Brzeżany area. In mid-July, the Russian command ordered a general retreat.

In early August 1917, the XV Corps began redeploying from Galicia to Palestine, and by September 26, 1917, the last units of the XV Corps had been transferred to Constantinople. By that time, the XV Corps had inflicted over 72,000 casualties on the enemy and repelled approximately five major offensives. The corps itself suffered approximately 25,000 casualties. German General Erich von Falkenhayn claimed in his memoirs that the Turks were "an exceptionally valuable asset for the Southern Army" and allowed the Germans to redeploy troops elsewhere in accordance with their mission to conserve manpower.

=== Sinai and Palestine campaign ===
On December 2, 1917, he was appointed commander of the 8th Army under the Yıldırım Army Group and sent to the Palestine Front. There, he served alongside Marshal Liman von Sanders, commander of the Yıldırım Army Group, Major General Mustafa Kemal Pasha, commander of the 7th Army, and Major General Ahmed Djemal Pasha, commander of the 4th Army. His army was positioned west of the Jordan River, along the coastal area. During the general enemy offensive that began on September 29, 1918, his army, facing a British army ten times stronger than its own, was unable to hold its front line. Enemy cavalry broke through the lines, advancing to the supply lines and cutting off the army's rear. As the Yıldırım Armies began to retreat one after another, Cevat Pasha and his staff aimed to retreat eastward towards Bisan, along the Jordan River. With all elements of his army destroyed or captured, Cevat Pasha and his men managed to escape to the east bank of the Jordan River. Shortly afterwards, he was sent to Istanbul by Liman von Sanders on the grounds that he no longer had a duty at the front.

== Truce period ==
He was appointed Chief of the General Staff on November 3, 1918. He served as Minister of War from December 19, 1918, to January 13, 1919. At the time of the signing of the Armistice of Mudros, he was acting as Chief of the General Staff, replacing Fevzi Pasha. Fevzi Pasha had taken 20 days of sick leave to avoid confronting the British army when it became clear they would occupy Istanbul. Then, shortly before the Greek landings in Izmir, Fevzi Pasha was dismissed from his post on May 14, 1919. On the same day, he was appointed Chief of the General Staff in Fevzi Pasha's place. He held this position until December 2, 1919.

== Exile in Malta ==
After the occupation of Constantinople by Allied forces, he was arrested by the British in March 1920 and held for a week in the Bekirağa Barracks, and then transferred to Malta on a warship on March 22, where he was registered as exile number 2773.

== The War of Independence Period ==
Following the exchange agreement signed between the Grand National Assembly of Turkey and the British Government on October 23, 1921, he returned to Turkey on January 15, 1922, and arrived in Ankara . On February 9, 1922, he was appointed Commander of the Al Jazira front, with his headquarters in Diyarbakır. On October 21, 1922, he became Inspector of the newly formed 3rd Army. On October 31, 1922, he resigned from this position and became a Member of Parliament for Elazığ.

== Republic Period ==
On November 17, 1924, he was asked to choose between high-ranking officers who were both serving in the army and in the Parliament. He resigned from his parliamentary seat on December 25, 1924, and was appointed to the Military Council on the same day. He was sent as a representative to the League of Nations during the Egyptian Question and the Iraqi Border Question. In 1932, he was sent as a delegate to the Geneva Arms Limitation Conference. On September 14, 1935, while serving as a member of the Military Council with the rank of General, he retired due to age limit.

== Later life ==
After his retirement, he lived in his mansion at Göztepe. He died on March 13, 1938. He was laid to rest in Sahrayı Cedit Cemetery. In 1988, he was moved to the Ankara State Cemetery.

Author Cevat Şakir Kabaağaçlı and the painters Aliye Berger and Fahrelnissa Zeid were his nephew and nieces.

== Medals and decorations ==
- Order of the Medjidieh 1st Class with Sword
- Gold Medal of Liyakat
- Gold Medal of Imtiyaz
- Bulgaria Order of Military Merit (Bulgaria)
- Bulgaria Order of St Alexander 2nd Class
- Spain Order of Isabella the Catholic 2nd Class
- Prussia Order of the Crown (Prussia) 2nd Class
- Prussia Iron Cross 1st and 2nd Class
- Prussia Order of the Red Eagle
- Bavaria Military Merit Order (Bavaria) 2nd Class with Sword
- Bavaria Merit Order of the Bavarian Crown 1st Class with Sword
- Austria-Hungary Military Merit Medal (Austria-Hungary) 2nd Class
- Austria-Hungary Red Cross 1st Class
- Austria-Hungary Order of the Iron Crown (Austria) 1st Class
- Austria-Hungary Order of the Iron Crown 2nd Class Military
- Medal of Independence with Red Ribbon & Citation

== See also ==
- List of high-ranking commanders of the Turkish War of Independence
- Media related to Cevat Çobanlı at Wikimedia Commons
