= Special Organization (Ottoman Empire) =

Paramilitary organization in the Ottoman Empire

- Teşkilât-ı Mahsusa تشکیلات مخصوصه
- Emblem of the Special Organization
- Other name: Office of Eastern Affairs
- Leaders: Bahaeddin Şakir; Nazım Bey
- Dates active: ~1913–1920
- Dissolved: 1920
- Country: Ottoman Empire
- Allegiance: Ministry of War (until 1915); CUP (1915–1920)
- Size: 30,000
- Part of: Committee of Union and Progress
- Wars: Italo-Turkish War; Balkan Wars; World War I

The Special Organization (Ottoman Turkish: تشکیلات مخصوصه, romanized: Teşkilât-ı Mahsusa, abbreviated TM) was an intelligence, paramilitary, and secret police organization in the Ottoman Empire known for its key role in the commission of the Armenian genocide. Originally organized under the Ministry of War, the organization was shifted to answer directly to the ruling party Committee of Union and Progress (CUP) in February 1915. It was led by Bahaeddin Şakir and Nazım Bey.

It formed in early 1914 of tribesmen (mostly Circassians and Kurds) as well as more than 10,000 convicted criminals—offered a chance to redeem themselves if they served the state—as a force independent of the regular army.

== Origins ==
The exact date of establishment is unclear or disputed. According to some researchers, the organization might have been established by Enver Pasha, who placed Süleyman Askeri in charge of the organization on 17 November 1913. Its establishment date is rather vague since it was really a continuation of various smaller groups established by Enver Pasha and friends in the aftermath of 1908 Young Turk Revolution. Some provincial bands in Eastern Anatolia directly integrated Kurdish Hamidiye units.

The organization maintained a clandestine budget and command structure controlled by the War Ministry. Its existence was kept secret from parliament and the public, and its existence, and crimes, were only revealed with foreign occupation and the 1919 military tribunals. It held a central committee made up of representatives of the Interior Ministry, War Ministry, and the CUP Central Committee, and another central committee based in Erzurum where Bahaeddin Şakir was based. Activities were coordinated between these central committees and local Unionist party secretaries.

The organization organized armed bands (çetes) which were integrated into the armies. The lack of discipline in these bands strained the relationship between the army and the Special Organization. Around February 1915 the organization was detached from the army and brought under the direct control of Şakir.

According to a Special Organization member's testimony during the military tribunals, a certain Rıza, there were two Special Organizations: one attached to the CUP, the other to the War Ministry, with the body under the party's control having organized units for Armenian deportation and extermination. The leader of this party controlled organization was Şakir. Another testimony states the Special Organization's War Ministry office was dissolved by April 1915.

== 1912–1913 ==
The Special Organization was founded to be a vanguard for a Muslim uprising in Bulgarian occupied Western Thrace during the Balkan Wars. The effort resulted in the short-lived Provisional Government of Western Thrace.

== 1915–1918 ==
=== Armenian genocide ===
Enver Pasha assumed the primary role in the direction of the Special Organization and its center of administration moved to Erzurum. The first leader of the Special Organization was Süleyman Askeri Bey. After his death, he was replaced by Ali Bey on 14 April 1915, who held the post until the Armistice of Mudros. The last director, Hüsamettin Ertürk, worked as an agent in Istanbul of the Ankara government following the Armistice. He wrote a memoir called İki Devrin Perde Arkası (Behind the Scenes of Two Eras).

Many members of this organization who played particular roles in the Armenian genocide also participated in the Turkish national movement. The Special Organisation, which was made of especially fanatical Unionist cadres, was expanded from August 1914 onwards. Talaat Pasha, as the Interior Minister, gave orders that all of the prisoners convicted of the worst crimes, such as murder, rape and robbery, could have their freedom if they agreed to join the Special Organisation to kill Armenians and loot their property. Besides the hardened career criminals who joined in large numbers to have their freedom, the rank and file of Special Organisation killing units included Kurdish tribesmen attracted by the prospect of plunder and refugees from Rumelia, who were thirsting for the prospect of revenge against Christians after having been forced to flee from the Balkans in 1912.

As explained in the key indictment at the trial (in absentia) of the Three Pashas, the Armenian genocide massacres were spearheaded by the Special Organisation under one of its leaders, the Turkish physician Dr. Behaeddin Shakir. The Special Organisation was much feared by all and were by all accounts the ones responsible for the worst violence against the Armenians. The American historian Gerard Libaridian wrote about the lethal combination in the Special Organisation of fanatical Unionist cadres commanding convicts newly released from prison:

The release of the vilest, unbridled animal passions served well the government's purpose of ensuring extermination in the most humiliating, dehumanizing fashion. The torture of thousands of women and children became a source of satisfaction for hundreds who sought and found official sanction from government officials as well as Muslim clergymen, since the murder of Armenians was characterized, like the war against the Entente, as a jihad or holy war. Human imagination labored to devise new ways of mutilating, burning and killing

— Gerard Libaridian

To prevent ordinary Muslims, whatever they be Turks, Kurds or Arabs, from saving the lives of the Armenians, a decree declaring the penalty for sheltering Armenians was death by hanging and the destruction of one's home was passed; despite this decree, a number of ordinary Turks, Kurds and Arabs did shelter Armenians from the fury of the Special Organisation. Other ordinary Turks, Kurds and Arabs did assist the army, the gendarmes and the Special Organisation in the deportations and killings, motivated by the desire to loot Armenian property, to have Armenian women and girls as sex slaves or because of incitements by Muslim clergymen saying that the genocide was an act of jihad. As the gendarmes rounded up the Armenians for deportation, it was common for slave markets to be established where for the right price a Muslim man could buy Armenian women and/or girls to use as his sex slaves. Besides genocide against the Armenians, the CUP regime waged the Assyrian genocide against the Assyrian minority and the Pontic Greek genocide against the Pontic Greeks in Pontus. In Thrace and western Anatolia the Special Organization assisted by government and army officials, deported all Greek men of military age to labor brigades beginning in summer 1914 and lasting through 1916.

=== Other activities ===
During World War I Eşref Sencer Kuşçubaşı was allegedly the director of operations in Arabia, the Sinai, and North Africa. He was captured in Yemen in early 1917 by the British military and was a POW in Malta until 1920 and subsequently released in exchange for British POWs. However, Ahmet Efe has written that the Ottoman military archives have detailed information on the organization's personnel, and that Kuşçubaşı is not mentioned.

In Libya, Nuri Killigil organized operations involving propaganda, subversion, terrorism and sabotage; he coordinated these operations with the Senussi.

== Members ==
This list includes allegedly notable members, according to an interview with its purported former leader Eşref Kuşçubaşı by U.S. INR officer Philip H. Stoddard: Although the bulk of its 30,000 members were drawn from trained specialists such as doctors, engineers, and journalists, the organization also employed criminals denoted başıbozuk, who had been released from prison in 1913 by amnesty.

== Disbanding ==
The organization was dismantled following a parliamentary debate and replaced by the General Revolutionary Organization of the Islamic World (Turkish: Umûm Âlem-i İslâm İhtilâl Teşkilâtı) after World War I. This organization held its first meeting in Berlin. However, it was forced underground by the British, who refused to let these German allies operate.

In 1921, Atatürk founded another secret organization called the National Defense League (Turkish: Müdafaa-i Milliye Cemiyeti), headed by the former chief of the Special Organization, Hüsamettin Ertürk.

== See also ==
- List of members of the Special Organization of the Ottoman Empire
- Osmancık Battalion (Ottoman Empire)
- Sentinel Association
- Umur-u Hafiye
- Black Musa

== Bibliography ==
- Akçam, Taner (2007). A Shameful Act. London: Macmillan.
- Efe, Ahmet (2007). Efsaneden Gerçeğe Kuşçubaşı Eşref. Bengi Yayınevi. ISBN 9789750111433.
- Fortna, Benjamin C. (2016). The Circassian: A Life of Esref Bey, Late Ottoman Insurgent and Special Agent. Hurst. ISBN 978-0-19-086268-8.
- Karsh, Efraim; Karsh, Inari (1999). Empires of Sand (hardback). Cambridge: Harvard University Press. ISBN 978-0-67425152-6.
- Safi, Polat (2006). The Ottoman Special Organization – Teşkilat-ı Mahsusa: A Historical Assessment with Particular Reference to Its Operations against British Occupied Egypt (1914-1916). Institute of Economics and Social Sciences of Bilkent University. Archived from the original on 2016-04-03. (unpublished MA thesis)
- Safi, Polat (January 2012). "History in the Trench: The Ottoman Special Organization – Teşkilat-ı Mahsusa Literature". Middle Eastern Studies. 48 (1): 89–106. doi:10.1080/00263206.2011.553898. hdl:11693/21630. S2CID 144689615.
- Stoddard, Philip Hendrick (1963). The Ottoman Government and the Arabs, 1911 to 1918: A Study of the Teskilat-i Mahsusa. Princeton University. (unpublished PhD dissertation; available in Turkish)
- Kaiser, Hilmar (2019). "Requiem for a Thug: Aintabli Abdulkadir and the Special Organization". In Kieser, Hans-Lukas; Anderson, Margaret Lavinia; Bayraktar, Seyhan; Schmutz, Thomas (eds.). The End of the Ottomans: The Genocide of 1915 and the Politics of Turkish Nationalism. Bloomsbury Publishing. pp. 67–92. ISBN 978-1-78673-604-8.
