= Volunteer force =

The Volunteer Force was a British part-time citizen army extant from 1859–1908.

Volunteer force may also refer to:

- British Volunteer Corps, 1794–1803
- Isle of Man Volunteers, 1860s–1920
- Volunteer Force (New Zealand), 1865–1910
- Volunteer Training Corps, 1914–1918
- Volunteer Force (Ireland), 1934-1947
- Sri Lanka Army Volunteer Force, formed 1949
- Osmancık Battalion (Ottoman Empire) 1914–1915

== See also ==
- V Force
- Volunteer military
- Military volunteer
