= Dardanelles Fortified Area Command =

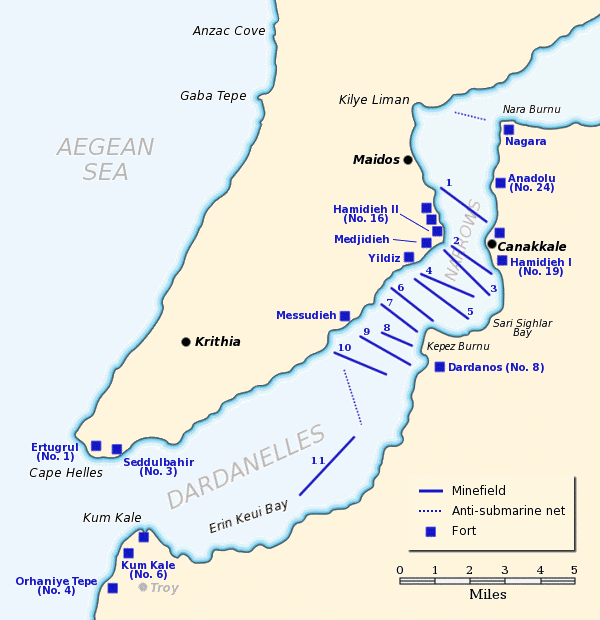
- The Dardanelles defenses in February/March 1915, showing minefields, anti-submarine nets and major gun batteries.
- Active: 1911–1949
- Country: Ottoman Empire; Turkey
- Type: Fortified Area Command
- Garrison/HQ: Çanakkale
- Patron: Sultans of the Ottoman Empire
- Engagements: World War I: Naval operations in the Dardanelles Campaign

Commanders
- Notable commanders: Mirliva Fahri Pasha; Mirliva Cevat Pasha (November 29, 1914 – October 8, 1915); Mirliva Nihat Pasha (October 1915 – November 1917); Miralay Selâhattin Bey (November 27, 1917 – December 29, 1918)

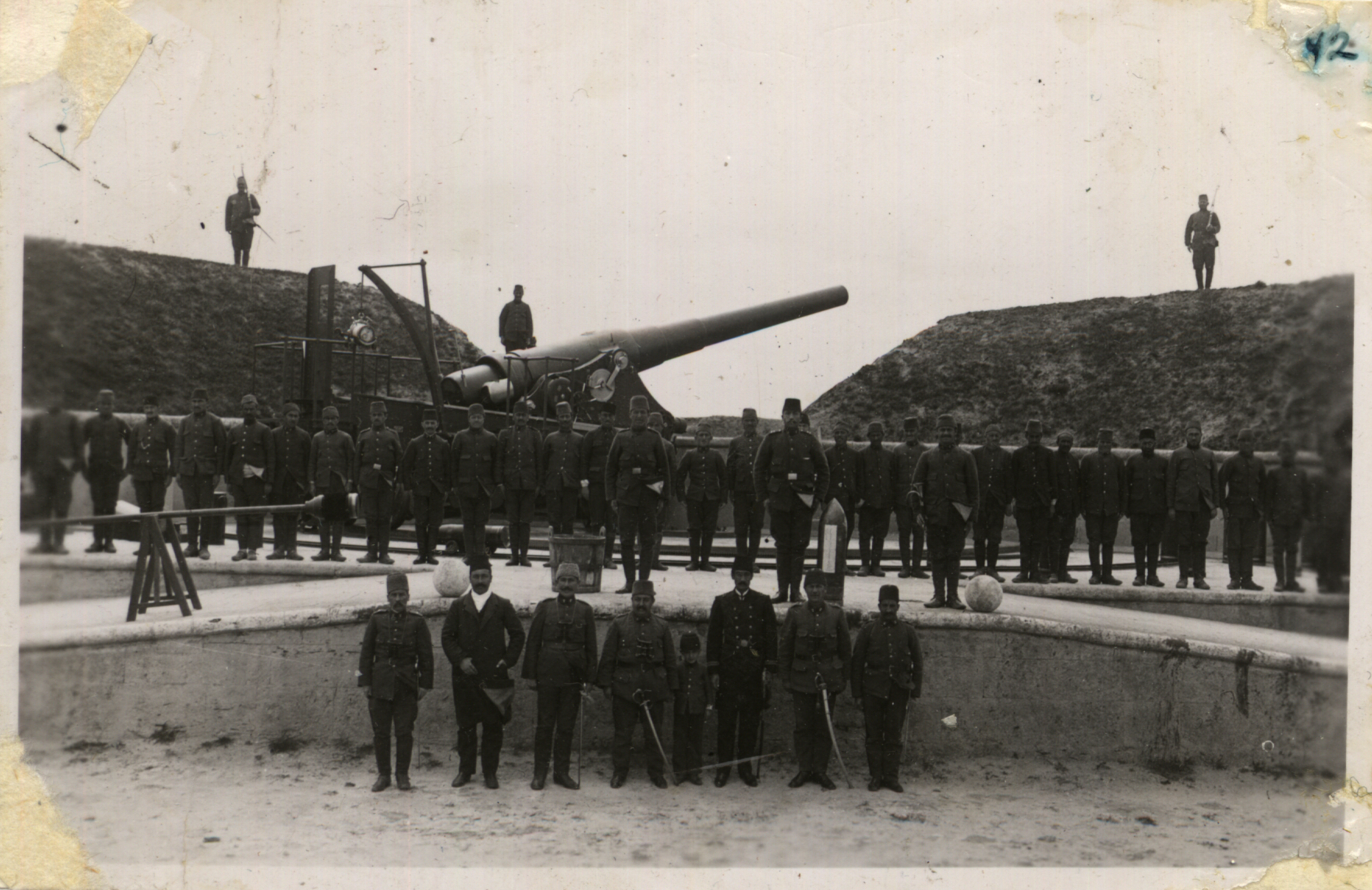
An Ottoman redoubt of the Dardanelles Fortified Area. The weapon is possibly a German-made 28 cm K L/40 on a coast defense mount.

The Dardanelles Fortified Area Command or Mediterranean Strait Fortified Area Command or Çanakkale Fortified Area Command (Turkish: Bahr-i Sefîd Boğazı Mevki(i) Müstahkem Komutanlığı or Akdeniz Boğazı Müstahkem Mevki(i) Komutanlığı or Çanakkale Boğazı Müstahkem Mevki(i) Komutanlığı or Çanakkale Müstahkem Mevki(i) Komutanlığı) was the Ottoman fortified area command and was formed to defend against attacks on the Dardanelles from the Aegean Sea.

After the founding of Turkey, the protection of the fortified position on the Dardanelles was entrusted to the 1st Corps, based in Çanakkale. The 2nd Corps, based in Gallipoli, defended the Gallipoli Peninsula against land attacks. The 1st Corps was abolished in 1947, and the Dardanelles Fortified Area Command was abolished in 1949. Since then, the Dardanelles Strait Command (Turkish: Canakkale Bogaz Komutanligi), established under the auspices of the Turkish Naval Forces, has guarded the position.

== Formations ==
=== Order of battle, 1911 ===
With reorganizations of the Ottoman Army, to include the creation of corps level headquarters, by 1911 the fortified area command was headquartered in Çanakkale, under the command of II Corps. The Dardanelles Fortified Area Command in 1911 was structured as such:

Dardanelles Fortified Area Command, Çanakkale

- 3rd Heavy Artillery Regiment
- 4th Heavy Artillery Regiment
- 5th Heavy Artillery Regiment
- Independent Heavy Artillery Regiment
- Torpedo Detachment
- Mine Detachment
- Wireless Detachment

=== Order of battle, December 1912 ===
In December 1912, the area command was structured as follows:

Dardanelles Fortified Area Command (Çanakkale, Commander: Mirliva Fahri Pasha)

- 3rd Heavy Artillery Regiment
- 4th Heavy Artillery Regiment
- 5th Heavy Artillery Regiment
- Independent Heavy Artillery Regiment
- Torpedo Detachment
- Underwater Mine Detachment
- 27th Infantry Division (Eceabat)
- Provisional Infantry Division (Bolayır)
- Afyon Redif Division (Eceabat)
- Çanakkale Redif Division (Cape Helles)
- Erdemit Redif Division (Suvla Bey)
- Kavak Detachment (Kavak)
- Menderes Detachment (Kum Kale)

=== Order of battle, 1915 ===
The Dardanelles Fortified Area was first-class fortified area, the commander of this fortified area was given the corps' authority. It was headquartered in Çanakkale. The formation of the fortified area in 1915 was as follows:

Dardanelles Fortified Area Command, Çanakkale

- 2nd Heavy Artillery Brigade (İkinci Ağır Topçu Tugayı), Çimenlik Tabyası
  - 3rd Heavy Artillery Regiment
  - 4th Heavy Artillery Regiment
  - 5th Heavy Artillery Regiment
- Fortress Engineer Company
- Engineer Construction Company
- Communication Company
- Mine Detachment
- Searchlight Detachment (8 searchlight)
- Fortified Area Ammunition Depot Detachment
- Bolayır Ammunition Depot Detachment
- Sea Transportation (3 motorboat with 3 small boat)
