= Ahmed Izzet Pasha =

Grand Vizier of the Ottoman Empire (1918)

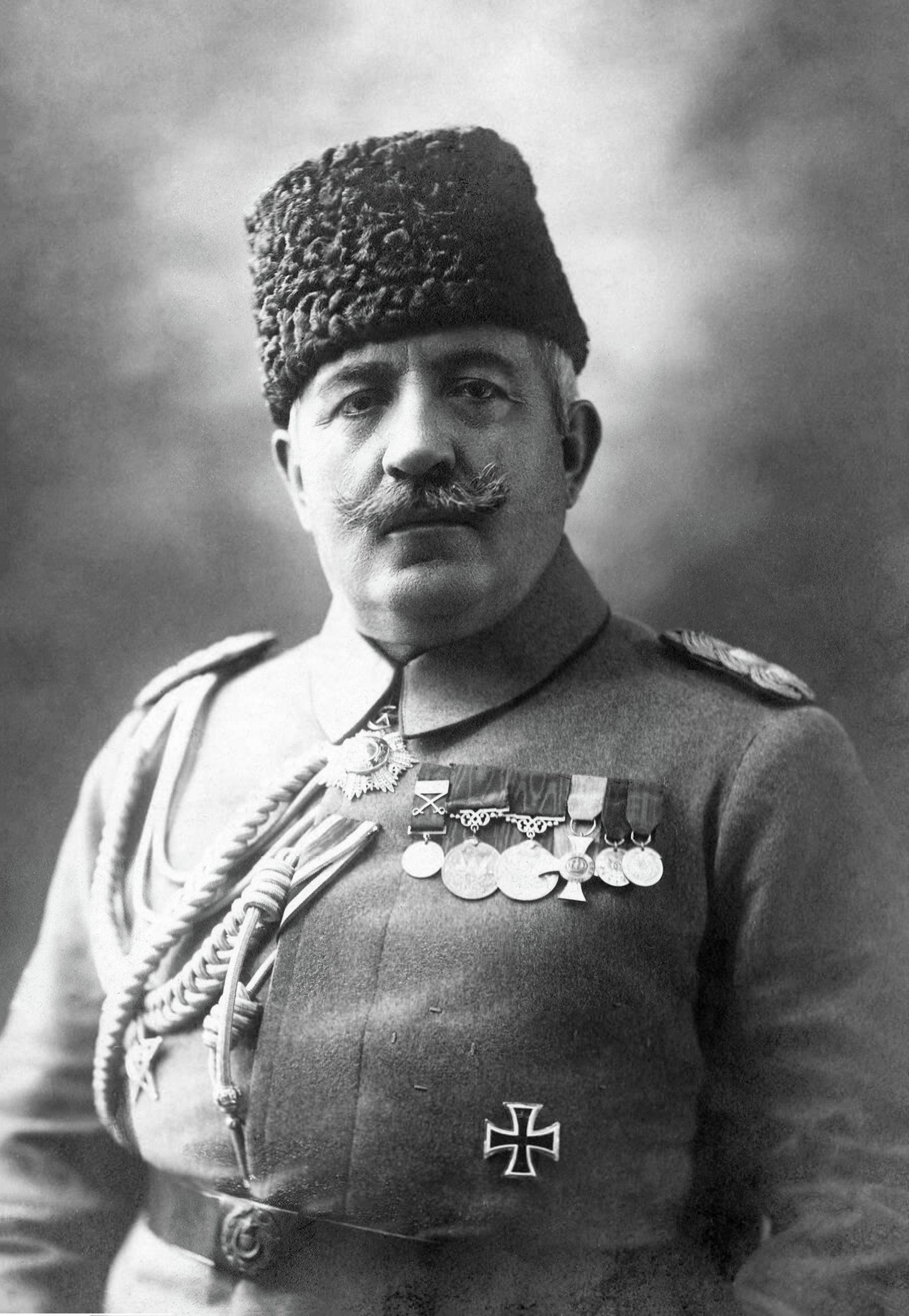
- Ahmed İzzet, c. 1918

Grand Vizier of the Ottoman Empire
- In office 14 October 1918 – 8 November 1918
- Monarch: Mehmed VI
- Preceded by: Talaat Pasha
- Succeeded by: Ahmet Tevfik Pasha

Minister of Foreign Affairs
- In office 13 June 1921 – 4 November 1922
- Monarch: Mehmed VI
- Prime Minister: Ahmet Tevfik Pasha
- Preceded by: Abdüllatif Safa Bey
- Succeeded by: Office abolished

Minister of War
- In office 14 October 1918 – 8 November 1918
- Monarch: Mehmed VI
- Prime Minister: Himself
- Preceded by: Enver Pasha
- Succeeded by: Kölemen Abdullah Pasha
- In office 11 June 1913 – 3 January 1914
- Monarch: Mehmed V
- Prime Minister: Said Halim Pasha
- Preceded by: Mahmud Şevket Pasha
- Succeeded by: Enver Pasha

Personal details
- Born: 1864 Nasliç, Manastir Vilayet, Ottoman Empire
- Died: 31 March 1937 (aged 72–73) Istanbul, Turkey
- Party: Committee of Union and Progress
- Education: Ottoman Military Academy (Class of 1884) Cav. 1st
- Profession: Soldier

Military service
- Allegiance: Ottoman Empire
- Branch/service: Ottoman Army
- Years of service: 1884–1922
- Rank: Field Marshal
- Commands: Second Army; Eastern Army Group
- Battles/wars: Yemeni-Ottoman Conflicts; Albanian Revolt of 1910; First World War; Turkish War of Independence

Ahmed Izzet Pasha (1864 – 31 March 1937 Ottoman Turkish: احمد عزت پاشا; Turkish: Ahmet İzzet Paşa), known as Ahmet İzzet Furgaç after the Turkish Surname Law of 1934, was a Turkish-Albanian soldier and statesman. He was a general during World War I and also one of the last Grand Viziers of the Ottoman Empire (14 October 1918 – 8 November 1918) and its last Minister of Foreign Affairs.

== Early life ==
Ahmed Izzet was born in Nasliç (Neapoli), Manastir Vilayet, into an Albanian family. His father, Haydar Bey, was a prominent civil servant of the area and a former governor. He graduated from Kuleli Military High School in 1881, the Harbiye School in 1884, and the General Staff School the following year. From 1887 to 1890 he was educated in strategy and military geography in the Ottoman Military College, while later until 1894 he studied in Germany under Colmar Freiherr von der Goltz. After returning home in 1894, he served in various positions in Istanbul, Syria, Palestine, and Sofia.

== Military career ==
During the Greco-Turkish War he played key roles in the planning of the Battle of Domokos and Çatalca. Though he was promoted to the rank of Miralay (colonel) after the war, he was arrested and interrogated before being reassigned to Damascus. Kaiser Wilhelm II, who praised his abilities while he was in Germany, reconnected with İzzet during his trip to Syria in 1901, and pressured the government to give İzzet a promotion and some medals. He performed important duties in Syria, Lebanon and Hejaz. In January 1904, he was assigned to suppress the Yemen rebellion as the chief of staff of the Ottoman army, being stationed there for three and a half years. In March 1905, he was promoted to Mirlivâ (brigadier general) and in 1907 to Ferik.

In 1908 after the Young Turk Revolution İzzet became chief of the Ottoman general staff. He was opposed to the military actions of the Ottoman army under Mahmud Shevket Pasha against Albanian nationalists during the Albanian revolt of 1910. His strong opposition to Shevket Pasha and von der Goltz led to his dismissal and reappointment to Yemen, to crush another revolt, in February 1911. He was made a member of the Ottoman Senate on 6 July 1911.

During his time in high command, he played a leading role in the modernization of the Ottoman army under the supervision of German military advisors. Together with von der Goltz from the German military advisory mission, he prepared war plans in case the Ottoman Empire entered a war in the Balkans and with Russia. He advocated for a defensive war of attrition strategy, and fortified key cities like Edirne and Yanya.

When he returned from Yemen on 17 November 1912, he was approached by Mehmed Talaat and Hacı Adil (Arda) to be Grand Vizier after a Unionist putsch. İzzet turned down the offer, and the CUP went ahead with their putsch on 23 January 1913. Shevket was elevated to the premiership instead but was subsequently assassinated 6 months later. In his place, İzzet was appointed War Minister in the Said Halim Pasha cabinet. Towards the end of the Balkan Wars, he served in the Army of Thrace and was deputy commander in chief.

İzzet Pasha resigned from the War Ministry in January 1914 when he refused to implement army reforms demanded by the CUP. Ismail Enver took his place with much protest by İzzet, due to his junior rank. When Ismail Qemali and Esad Pasha Toptani proposed that İzzet Pasha be installed as Prince of Albania, he refused.

He was a fierce opponent of entering World War I, and did not serve in the first two years of the conflict. In 1916, he was appointed commander of the Second Army which fought in the Caucasus alongside the Third Army, and suffered defeat against the advancing Russians. In 1917, he was appointed to command the Caucasus Army Group, which comprised the Second and Third Armies. He also served as Aide-de-camp of Sultan Mehmed VI during the war.

== Grand Vizierate ==
During the end of the war, he was called upon to lead the government that signed the Armistice of Mudros on behalf of the Ottoman Empire, thus putting an end to the First World War for the Ottomans (he was also promoted to marshal). He was Talaat Pasha's and also Mustafa Kemal Pasha's (Atatürk) preferred candidate for a post-war government. His government consisted mainly of the anti-war faction of the CUP, including figures such as Mehmed Cavid, Rauf (Orbay), and Fethi (Okyar). It was predicted in the press that Kemal Pasha was to be War Minister, but Izzet chose not to put him there, instead he himself also served concurrently as War Minister and Foreign Minister. The government did not have any minorities represented in cabinet, though he recalled offering some ministries to two well respected Greek and Armenian bureaucrats.

The government received a vote on confidence on 19 October 1918, with the program which described the war-time CUP's governments and its policies without criticism, and wrote of the "deportation affair" as something "compelled by the exigencies of the war." Nevertheless, the new government understood that the empire's fate would be decided in the upcoming Paris Peace Conference, and had to appear amenably distant from the war-time CUP government. On the issue of the fate of non-Turkish minorities, which was described as a "great torment" suffered by the "children of the homeland", plans were announced to return the property, possessions, and provide compensation. Also discussed were new electoral laws to increase minority participation in government, the affirmation of Wilsonian principle of national self-determination, and autonomy for the Arab provinces.

İzzet Pasha issued a proclamation allowing deportees the right to return to their homes. Before his resignation he endorsed plans to form dozens of commissions that would return or compensate the losses of homes and businesses to Ottoman Greek and Armenian deportees. However these commissions often resulted in a returned property being inaccurately appraised, already looted, or occupied by resettled muhacirs. Local officials also complicated the process of return by refusing service. By 1920, 335,000 Ottoman Greek and Armenians returned to their homes, according to Ottoman press.

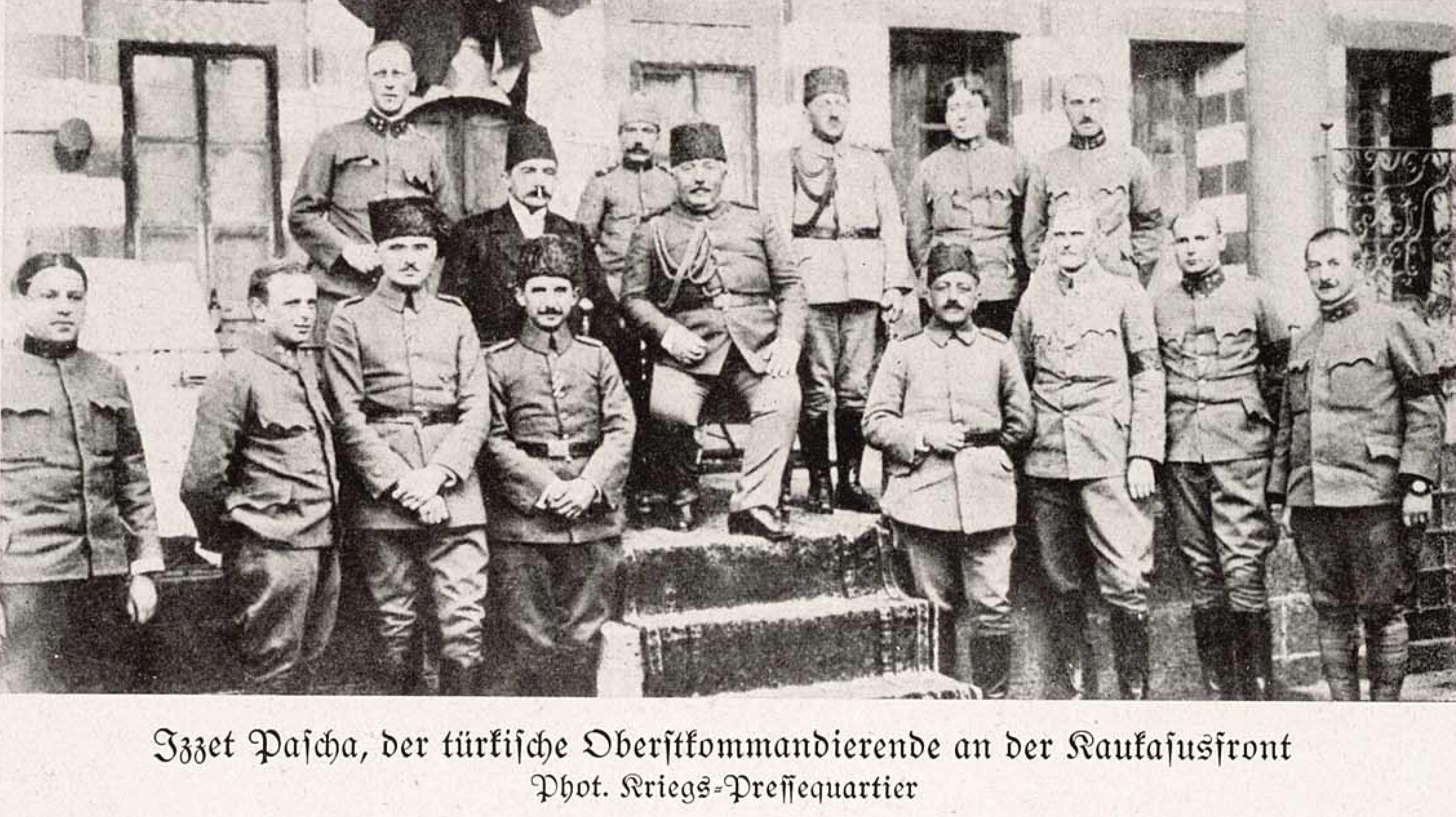
İzzet Pasha's general staff of the Caucasus front

He was dismissed on 8 November 1918. Afterwards, he was criticized for allowing all three of the Three Pashas to escape abroad on the night of 2–3 November before they could be put on trial in the Turkish Courts-Martial of 1919–20 for crimes including atrocities against the Armenians of the Empire. While most of the allies' concerns were heeded in his short ministry, he resisted prosecuting and delivering justice to the Unionists, and in his memoirs, wrote of them in positive terms. This reverence for the CUP even included the blocking of investigations of the Unionists, direct interventions for the safe passages of Special Organization members out of the capital, and the destruction of incriminating documents and archives. His naval minister and representative at Mudros, Rauf Orbay, noted that "[Enver] Pasha's protection is the duty of the government. I am personally obliged." and that they would never acquiesce to the demands of the Entente powers to prosecute Unionists. İzzet Pasha let Talat know the following: "As long as I am in the cabinet, I will never turn you over to the enemy. But who knows how long I will remain in the cabinet?"

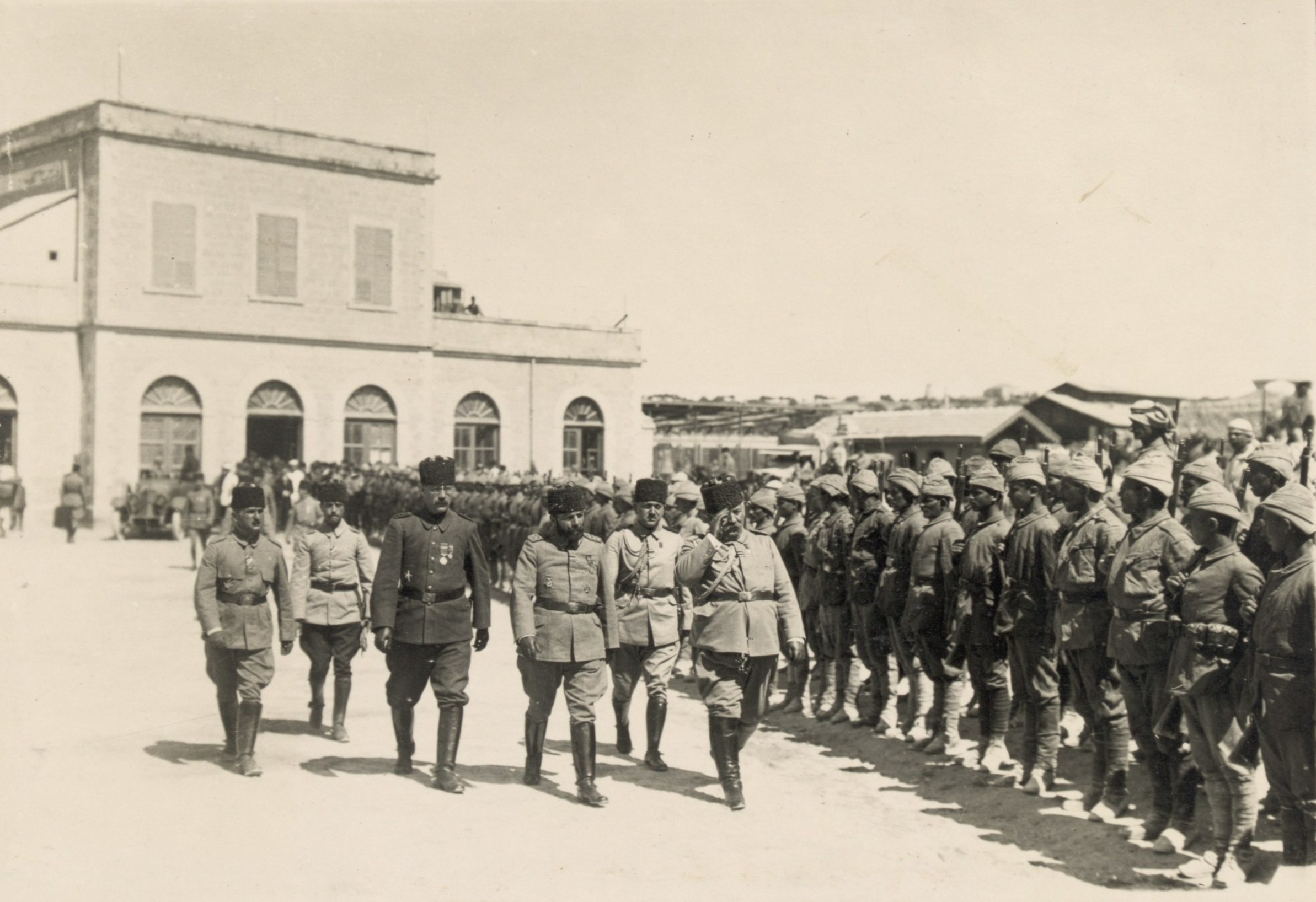
Ahmed Izzet Pasha and Djemal Pasha arriving in Jerusalem in 1917

İzzet spent much of his 25-day premiership bedridden with the Spanish flu.

== Turkish War of Independence ==
Ahmed İzzet Pasha came back into government as War Minister in Damat Ferid Pasha's cabinet. According to himself, he took important steps to reorganize Ottoman armies and prepare them for renewed combat. He was one of many statesmen of the Istanbul government clandestinely supportive of the Nationalist movement. Under Grand Vizier Ali Rıza Pasha he became a sort of unofficial ambassador for the Ottoman government to the Nationalist Movement, then based in Sivas organized under the Committee of Representation.

On 5 December 1920 he accompanied Salih Pasha (now former Grand Vizier) to meet with Mustafa Kemal in Bilecik. The goal of the meeting was to coordinate common policy between Istanbul and the Nationalist Movement, now based in Ankara. It was hoped the two governments could pressure the allies to amend the Treaty of Sèvres. After the conference, Mustafa Kemal did not allow the two to return to Istanbul, and detained them in Ankara for three months.

He was eventually allowed to return to Istanbul in March 1921, whereupon İzzet Pasha became Minister of Foreign Affairs in the Tevfik Pasha cabinet. He remained in this position until the dissolution of the Ottoman government on 4 November 1922, making him the last Ottoman foreign minister. İzzet's acceptance of the job meant he was harshly criticized by Kemal in his famous 1927 speech, because he promised Kemal that he would not serve in an Istanbul cabinet while in Ankara. İzzet Pasha was accused of "preserving his support for the caliph until the end of his life."

== Republic ==
After the dissolution of the Ottoman Empire and the subsequent loss of the title of pasha after the establishment of the Turkish Republic, Ahmed İzzet adopted the surname Furgaç in 1934. He lived on a pension, though in 1934, he was appointed to the board of directors of the Istanbul Electricity Company, which provided him with "a certain amount of peace of mind." He died in his home in Moda, Istanbul on 31 March 1937. He was buried in the Karacaahmet Cemetery.

== Legacy ==
Ahmed İzzet Pasha's decisions during the Caucasus campaign have also been criticized and are regarded as one of the factors of its failure, while his subsequent high reputation in Turkey has been attributed to his successful activity during the Turkish War of Independence.

== Personality ==
According to Ali Fuat Cebesoy, İzzet Pasha was highly knowledgeable on military sciences, strategy, philosophy, literature. He knew in addition to his native Turkish, he knew Albanian, German, French, Arabic and Persian. He valued his modesty.

== See also ==
- List of field marshals of the Ottoman Empire

Political offices
Preceded by Said Halim Pasha	Minister of War; 11 June 1913 – 3 January 1914	Succeeded by Enver Pasha
Preceded by Talaat Pasha	Grand Vizier of the Ottoman Empire; 14 October 1918 – 8 November 1918	Succeeded by Ahmet Tevfik Pasha
Preceded by Enver Pasha	Minister of War; 14 October 1918 – 8 November 1918	Succeeded by Kölemen Abdullah Pasha
Preceded by Abdüllatif Safa Bey	Minister of Foreign Affairs; 13 June 1921 – 4 November 1922	Office abolished
