= Zornitsa, Haskovo Province =

Zornitsa
- Village
- Location in Bulgaria
- Coordinates: 41.809°N 25.441°E
- Country: Bulgaria
- Province: Haskovo Province
- Municipality: Haskovo
- Time zone: UTC+2 (EET)
  - Summer (DST): UTC+3 (EEST)

Zornitsa is a village in the municipality of Haskovo, in Haskovo Province, in southern Bulgaria.
