= Nuri Conker =

Turkish politician

- Conker in 1935
- Born: 20 September 1882; Thessaloniki, Salonica Vilayet, Ottoman Empire
- Died: 11 January 1937 (aged 54); Ankara, Turkey
- Burial place: Ankara Şehitliği; State Cemetery
- Military career
- Allegiance: Ottoman Empire (1902–20); Turkey (1920–27)
- Service years: Ottoman Empire: 1902–20; Turkey: June, 1920–27
- Rank: Brigadier
- Commands: Chief of Staff of the 1st Division, 24th Regiment, Military attaché to The Hague; General Director of the Press and Intelligence, Ankara Command, 41st Division (Governor of Adana Vilayet)
- Conflicts: Italo-Turkish War; Balkan Wars; First World War; Turkish War of Independence
- Other work: Member of the GNAT (Kütahya); Member of the GNAT (Gaziantep); Member of the administrative board of the Türkiye İş Bankası

Mehmet Nuri Conker (September 20, 1882 – January 11, 1937) was a Turkish politician and an officer of the Ottoman Army and the Turkish Army.

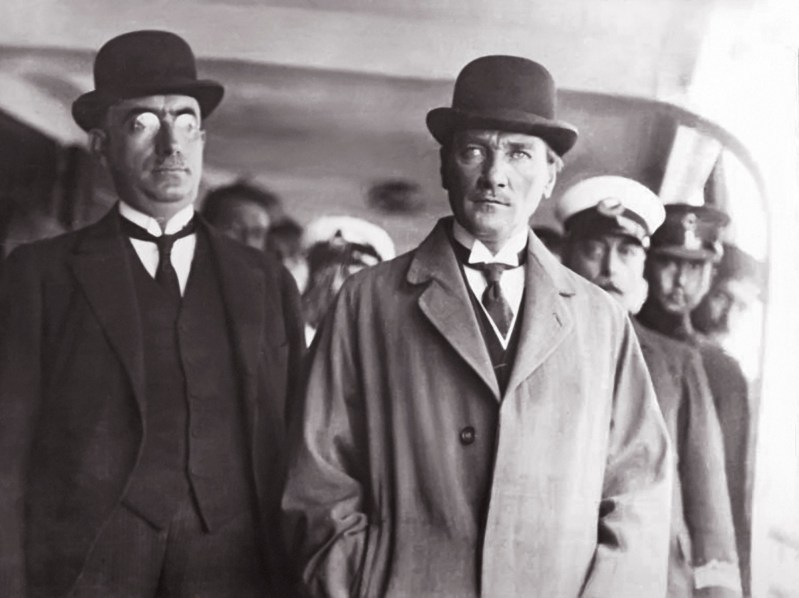
Conker (left) and Atatürk in 1931

. Conker was a friend from childhood of Mustafa Kemal (Atatürk). Conker was a graduate of the War Academy of the Ottoman Empire (Harp Akademisi). He retired as a Colonel (Kurmay Albay). Conker married Nedime Hanim (1890?-1969) and they had four children. His sister Dürriye Hanım married Salih Bozok. According to Philip Hendrick Stoddard, he was a brother-in-law of Süleyman Askerî Bey.

Conker fought in Libya, Manastir, the Dardanelles, the Eastern front, in Syria and in the Turkish War of Independence. He was wounded twice: once in Bolayır and again in the Dardanelles, at Conk Bayir (the Chunuk Hill). Mustafa Kemal Ataturk gave Conker his last name in memory of Conk Bayiri. Conker was assigned as the Governor of Adana in 1921 after the withdrawal of the French forces in the aftermath of the Franco-Turkish War. He was elected to Grand National Assembly as the Representative from Kütahya (1923-1927). He was also elected to the Grand National Assembly as the Representative from Gaziantep (1932 and 1935). Conker was the Deputy Chairman of the Grand National Assembly during its 5th session and as Acting Chairman in 1935. He took part in the development of the Turkish Army along with Mustafa Kemal. He knew French, German and Arabic.

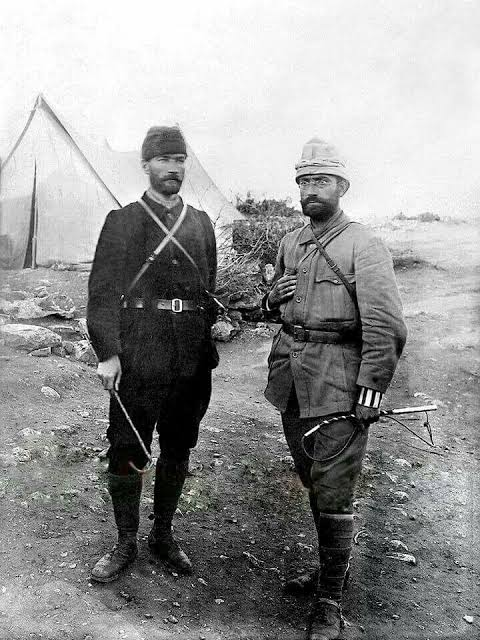
Conker (right) and Atatürk in Libya during the Italo-Turkish War

== Works ==
- Conker, Mehmed Nuri, Zâbit ve Kumandan, İş Bankası Yayınları, Ankara, 1959. (He wrote this book in 1930, Mustafa Kemal's Zâbit ve Kumandan ile Hasbihal was the answer to Nuri's work.)

== See also ==
- List of high-ranking commanders of the Turkish War of Independence
