= Ottoman General Staff =

General Staff of the Ottoman Empire
- (Ottoman Turkish: ارکان حربیه عمومیه ریاستى, Erkân-ı Harbiye-i Umûmiye Riyâseti)
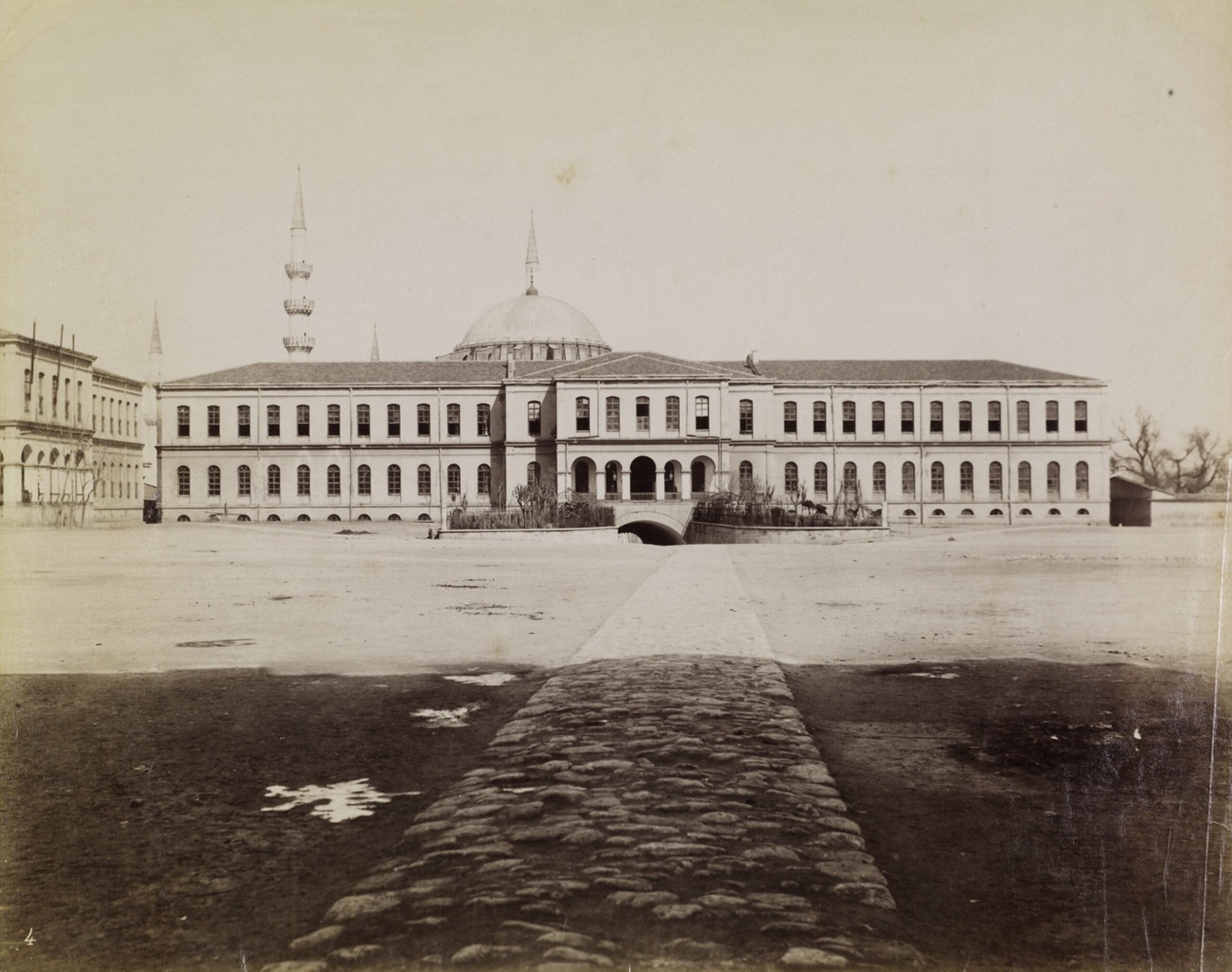
- Ministry of War building, Beyazıt, Istanbul in 1880–1890
- Active: 1880–1922
- Country: Ottoman Empire
- Allegiance: Ottoman Army
- Branch: Active duty
- Type: Staff
- Role: Commanding the Mansure Army; Exercising the authority of Commander-in-Chief on behalf of the Sultan during wartime
- Part of: Mansure Army; Ministry of War
- Headquarters: Ministry of War; Beyazıt, Istanbul
- Colors: Red, White

Commanders
- Notable commanders: Osman Nuri Pasha; Goltz Pasha; Ahmed Izzet Pasha; Enver Pasha; Fevzi (Çakmak) Pasha; Cevat (Çobanlı) Pasha; Zeki (Kolaç) Pasha

The General Staff of the Ottoman Empire (Ottoman Turkish: Erkân-ı Harbiye-i Umûmiye Riyaseti) was the title held by the highest-ranking officer in the Ottoman Army after the Minister of War between 1880 and 1922. In terms of duties and responsibilities, the office was subordinated to the office of the Serasker between 1880 and 1908, and to the Ministry of War between 1808 and 1922. The office attained an autonomous structure from 1908 onwards. The institution was officially abolished in 1922 with the liquidation of the Istanbul government.

== Early history ==
=== Precursors and early concepts ===
The early 18th century saw shifts in the regional balance of power, resulting in a growing engagement of Ottoman political and military elites with contemporary European military doctrines and technologies. The century was characterised by increasing momentum of institutional reorganisation and technological adaptation, but a systematic and centralised restructuring of the military apparatus became a primary state policy under Sultan Selim III. The 19th century was a period of large-scale institutional change, characterised by the demolition of old military structures and the creation of new formations. In this context, Ottoman administrative and military authorities sought to assimilate Western European organisational models, tactical doctrines and technical innovations to consolidate state authority and protect territorial integrity against external threats.

=== European influence and early organization ===
In 1843 the jurisdiction of the Military Council (Ottoman Turkish: Dâr-ı Şûrâ-yı Askerî) was expanded and the Ordnance Council (Ottoman Turkish: Meclis-i Tophâne-i Âmire) was established to reorganise the artillery branch. Simultaneously, the authority of the Military Ministry (Ottoman Turkish: Bâb-ı Seraskerî) was strengthened; the Serasker (Commander-in-chief), the commander-in-chief of the regular army (Nizâmiye) was formally appointed the commander of all land forces. The Serasker's bureaucratic rank was raised to be equal to the rank of the Grand Vizier and the Sheikh ul-Islam in terms of administration. In 1845 the newly established Gendarmerie Marshalsy (in Ottoman Turkish, Zabtiye Müşirliği) took over the internal security and public order in Istanbul and the provinces. In 1848, the Army of Iraq and the Army of Hejaz were created, following the organisational structure set forth in the 1843 Regulation that had divided the Ottoman land forces into five regional armies. Structurally the Ottoman army was reorganised and the French infantry and cavalry manuals were adopted with Prussian tactical regulations being used for the artillery. Conscription policies were also formalised, with quota distributions based on regional demographics, creating a system in which one eligible individual per household was conscripted, while only children were exempt from military service.

The Ottoman army was compelled to accept foreign military aid because of the absence of highly skilled staff officers to implement far-reaching organisational reforms. Sultan Abdul Hamid II, diplomatically wary of France and Great Britain, found a willing partner in the newly unified German Empire, which was eager to establish itself on the international stage. One of the main geopolitical reasons for the acquisition of Prussian military expertise was the fact that the Ottoman statesmen saw Berlin, unlike other European powers, not as a threat to the territorial integrity of the Ottoman Empire in the immediate future. The Congress of Berlin upheld territorial losses under European pressure, but the German leadership did not appear to have immediate expansionist intentions toward Ottoman territories. The Prussian army’s decisive victories against the Austrian Empire in 1866-1867 and the Second French Empire in 1870-1871 had also made the Prussian general staff system a global model and forced the Ottoman administrators to look to this military establishment for help.

The Ottoman request to Prussia for military organization and training in the reign of Abdul Hamid II was not without precedent. In 1798, at the orders of Sultan Selim III, Prussian Colonel Adolf von Goetze came to Istanbul to inspect Ottoman military units. Similarly Helmuth von Moltke (later Field Marshal and Prussian General Staff) was a military advisor and instructor in the Ottoman army from 1835 to 1839. Five years after Moltke’s departure, the Prussian Colonel von Kuczkonski arrived in Istanbul to train the Ottoman law enforcement apparatus. Therefore, the Ottoman Empire had always turned to Prussian military know-how to modernise its troops.

Under Abdul Hamid II, the Ottoman government once more sought Prussian officers, technical experts, and military specialists to supervise reforms of the army. This demand for trained personnel was not limited to purely combat roles, but also into the technical and administrative sectors. The diplomatic reorientation initiated by the Sultan, combined with the later Eastern policy of Kaiser Wilhelm II (Weltpolitik), established the basis for a long-term strategic alliance between the Ottoman Empire and Germany. Prussian officers were incorporated into the Ottoman command structure, Ottoman military cadets received advanced training in Berlin as a priority, and bilateral trade increased significantly. Thus, Ottoman-German relations were much better than in the past. Ottoman leaders saw the partnership as a way of institutional survival and modernization, but it also served to advance German geopolitical interests in the Near East and provide a lucrative market for the German defence industries.

=== Prussian military mission and the Goltz era ===
==== Kaehler mission and initial reports ====
Sultan Abdul Hamid II sent his advisor, Major Dresysse of French origin, to the German Ambassador, Paul von Hatzfeld, in May 1880 to discuss the potential deployment of German military officers to serve in the Ottoman Empire and to request that the matter be brought to the attention of the German government. Although the German government was receptive to providing such assistance in order to expand its sphere of influence in the region, the political circumstances of the time prolonged the process of realizing Sultan Abdul Hamid II's desire. In August 1881, the Ottoman Empire renewed its request for the dispatch of German military officers. Finally, on 11 April 1882, the President of the German Military Cabinet formally notified the Foreign Ministry that the Emperor had given his consent for the deployment of four officers to Turkey. Consequently, a team of four German officers, led by Colonel Otto August Johannes Kaehler, and comprising Infantry Captain Kamphövener, Cavalry Captain von Hobe, and Artillery Captain Ristow, arrived in Turkey after being granted leave from their respective units.

Upon their arrival, the military mission faced immediate institutional friction within the Ottoman military infrastructure. Kaehler's initial assessments heavily criticized the deep operational and cultural divide between the formally educated staff officers (mektepli) and those who had risen through the ranks without academic training (alaylı). In his comprehensive reports submitted to the Sublime Porte, Kaehler highlighted that while the senior command structure possessed theoretical familiarity with contemporary doctrines "on paper", the practical implementation (safhası) suffered from severe systemic deficiencies.

Kaehler’s attention was drawn especially to three vital structural weaknesses: the absence of shared tactical training among officers, the operational insufficiency of the "Redif" (reserve) system and, above all, the overcentralization and bureaucratization of command, which virtually suppressed tactical independence and inhibited maneuvering in the field. To remedy these problems, the mission recommended the creation of model units (numune taburları) in Istanbul to show modern Prussian tactical drills and logistical planning with the goal of improving the overall training quality of the Ottoman infantry, cavalry, and artillery branches. Yet even with these initiatives, the extensive bureaucratic resistance and the inherent instability of the administrative apparatus prevented Kaehler’s suggested structural reforms from being put into practice immediately.

The report prepared by Kaehler was as follows:

- The '''Ottoman Army''' should be reorganized into a structure consisting of twelve corps and six cavalry divisions, similar to the Prussian model.
- Each corps should have a mix of '''Nizamiye''' and '''Redif''' divisions, which would be the first to be mobilized in times of war.
- The report noted that officer training was inadequate and that practical training should be given more emphasis. It also recommended that the transition from non-commissioned officer to commissioned officer should be completely halted, and that the '''Ottoman General Staff''' should be reorganized according to the Prussian model.

==== Goltz Era ====
Although the initial initiatives of the Kaehler mission yielded limited immediate structural results for the Ottoman military, the Sublime Porte continued to prioritize the improvement of its military education system by seeking further assistance from Berlin. Early in 1883, the Ottoman government requested the deployment of a high-ranking officer from the German Empire to oversee military instruction and academic curriculum. Major Baron Colmar Freiherr von der Goltz was selected by the German command for this mission. Arriving in Istanbul on 18 June 1883, Goltz formally entered Ottoman service on 25 August, beginning a tenure that would deeply influence Ottoman military modernization. Appointed as the Inspector of Military Schools (Askerî Okullar Müfettişi), Goltz subsequently assumed the leadership of the German military mission following the death of Colonel Otto Kaehler. Concurrently, he was appointed as the Assistant Chief of the Ottoman General Staff (Erkân-ı Harbiye Reis-i Sânî).

During his tenure, Goltz engaged comprehensively with various facets of the Ottoman armed forces, focusing heavily on the restructuring of the military academies to elevate the professional standards of the officer corps. He systematically reorganized the curricula of the military schools and authored several influential technical manuals published in Ottoman Turkish, including Staff Duties in War and Peace (Savaş ve Barışta Kurmay Görevleri), Staff Duties on Maps (Harita Üzerinde Kurmay Görevleri), Staff Duties in the Field (Sahra Üzerinde Kurmay Görevleri), Tactical Handbook (Taktik El Kitabı), and Instructional Techniques (Ders Verme Teknikleri).

To ensure that newly commissioned officers possessed practical command capabilities, Goltz emphasized field exercises and applied tactical training over purely theoretical instruction. His advisory role extended into broader defensive infrastructure, contributing significantly to the drafting of the 1886 Conscription Law, the structural reorganization of the reserve (Redif) units, the streamlining of mobilization protocols, and the development of strategic transport infrastructure, including road and railway construction. Serving as a military advisor from 1883 until 1895, the Prussian general played a decisive role in integrating Prussian military doctrine into the mindset of the Ottoman officer corps. Simultaneously, this overarching institutional consensus provided a near monopoly for German defence contractors in the Ottoman market. Goltz’s strategic and technical recommendations always coincided with the commercial and political interests of German arms producers and heavy industries.

==== Reforms of the Staff College and Prussian model ====
Goltz essentially restructured the Ottoman Staff College (Mekteb-i Erkân-ı Harbiye), which had operated on French polytechnic principles with a focus on civil engineering, mathematics and cartography. Replacing this model with the pedagogy of the Prussian War Academy (Preußische Kriegsakademie), Goltz prioritized applied military sciences, combined-arms tactics, and operational planning. The curriculum introduced practical training methodologies, including staff rides (Generalstabsreisen; erkân-ı harp tatbikat gezileri), tactical map problems, and war gaming (Kriegsspiel). Admission standards were tightened to admit only the top graduates from the Imperial Military Academy (Harbiye), creating a competitive, highly selective staff track that produced roughly twenty to thirty general staff officers (erkân-ı harp) annually. This institutional shift transformed Ottoman staff officers from administrative scribes and fortress engineers into operational planners capable of directing corps- and army-level maneuvers.

==== Doctrine of Das Volk in Waffen ====
The intellectual foundation of the reorganized staff corps was heavily shaped by Goltz's military treatise Das Volk in Waffen (1883), translated into Ottoman Turkish by Kolağası Mehmed Tahir in 1884 as Millet-i Müselleha (The Nation in Arms). Goltz posited that contemporary warfare demanded total societal mobilization, universal conscription, and the subordination of state infrastructure to military readiness. In the Ottoman context, where existential territorial crises and external pressures were acute, this doctrine was adopted by staff officers not merely as a mobilization manual, but as a socio-political blueprint.

The concept fostered what military historians term the "Goltz Generation" (Goltz Nesli), instilling a corporatist ethos in which the officer corps perceived itself as the primary modernizing vanguard tasked with preserving the empire from internal decay and external partition. Goltz's emphasis on offensive spirit, tactical autonomy (Auftragstaktik), and professional cohesion gave staff candidates an institutional identity distinct from the traditional palace hierarchy.

== Young Turk Reforms and institutionalization ==
Following the Young Turk Revolution of 1908 and the subsequent suppression of the 31 March incident in 1909 by the Action Army, the reformist Mektepli (academy-trained) staff officers established decisive control over the Ottoman military administration. The deposition of Sultan Abdul Hamid II eliminated the palace's personal military entourage (Mabeyn), allowing the newly appointed Chief of the General Staff, Ahmed Izzet Pasha, and Minister of War Mahmud Shevket Pasha to initiate extensive institutional overhauls modelled directly on the Prussian-German general staff system.

=== Officer corps purge and professionalization ===
Following the 1908 Revolution and the suppression of the 31 March incident in 1909, senior military figures, including Chief of the General Staff Ahmed Izzet Pasha and Minister of War Mahmud Shevket Pasha, sought to eliminate political factionalism and curb the influence of rank-promoted (Alaylı) officers who resisted modern staff doctrine. To dismantle Hamidian palace favouritism and establish a merit-based officer corps dominated by academy graduates (Mektepli), the Supreme Military Council enacted a series of structural laws in the summer of 1909. In June 1909, the Law for Age Limitation established strict age ceilings across all ranks, forcing nearly 7,500 uneducated and elderly officers into compulsory retirement. This was reinforced on 7 August 1909 by the Law for the Purge of Military Ranks (Tasfiye-i Rüteb-i Askeriye Kanunu), which revoked unearned promotions granted during Abdul Hamid II's reign and demoted officers to their legitimate service-based ranks unless they had demonstrated wartime distinction. Complementary legislation created inspection commissions on 22 August 1909 to audit medical exemptions, while a parallel pension law provided financial settlements to incentivize voluntary retirements.

Age limitations for military ranks (June 1909)
Rank (Ottoman Turkish)	English equivalent	Age limit
Mülâzım-ı Sâni / Mülâzım-ı Evvel	Second and First Lieutenant	41
Yüzbaşı	Captain	46
Binbaşı	Major	52
Kaymakam	Lieutenant Colonel	55
Miralay	Colonel	58
Mirliva	Brigadier General	60
Ferik / Birinci Ferik	Major General and Lieutenant General	65
Müşir	Field Marshal	68

Although frequent cabinet changes resulted in doctrinal friction between French-trained figures like Nazım Pasha and German-oriented commanders such as Mahmud Shevket Pasha, Ahmed Izzet Pasha's continuous tenure as Chief of the General Staff (1908–1914) provided institutional continuity for comprehensive organizational reforms.

=== Universal conscription and manpower challenges ===
A key goal of the Young Turk military reforms was to replace the selective conscription model with a universal draft to resolve chronic manpower shortages. Under the previous system, broad collective exemptions covered residents of Istanbul, Mecca, and Medina, along with Islamic seminary (medrese) students and non-Muslim subjects who paid an exemption tax (bedel-i askeri). These exemptions kept roughly 26 percent of the male population out of military service, placing almost the entire mobilization burden on Muslim peasants from Anatolia and Rumelia.

In July 1909, the parliament passed the Law for the Abolishment of Non-Muslims' Exemption from Military Service, terminating both non-Muslim and theological student exemptions. Despite the implementation of universal drafts starting in October 1909, the initiative yielded limited military utility:

- Many non-Muslim subjects sought exemptions via cash payments (bedel-i nakdi), emigration, or acquiring foreign passports.
- Communal demands arose for segregated ethnic units, separate catering and Christian officers which were rejected by the government in favour of integrated ranks.
- The General Staff distrusted one another, and consequently a large proportion of the non-Muslim recruits were assigned to unarmed logistics and rear-echelon supply units rather than to frontline combat formations.

Therefore, the attempt to introduce universal conscription did not meet strategic expectations, and the General Staff had to rely on the traditional rural Muslim population for future mobilization efforts.

== Organization and structure ==
The Military Reorganization Commission (Tensîkât-ı Askeriye Komisyonu) restructured the Ottoman military apparatus in a radical way by introducing a clear distinction between the administrative governance and operational command after the administrative restructuring that began after the defeat of 1877–1878. As part of this institutional reform, administrative affairs were assigned to the Seraskerate and operational command was directly subordinated to the Sultan as Commander-in-Chief. This gave the Chief of the General Staff the right to directly report to the sovereign without bureaucratic intermediaries. The General Staff Department (Erkân-ı Harbiye Dairesi) was officially formed as the primary operational authority for the issuance of all imperial military directives and operational orders, while the specialized command branches were decentralized into separate inspectorates such as;

- Military Education (Maârif-i Askeriye),
- Transport (Nakliyât-ı Askeriye),
- Veterinary Services (Hidmet-i Baytariye),
- Military Medical Affairs (Umûr-ı Sıhhiye-i Askeriye) for the purpose of maintaining technical readiness and branch-specific administration.

=== Selection and education of staff officers ===
Like Imhoff, infantry specialist Ditfurth also distinguished himself with his professional expertise in field manoeuvres and infantry tactics. Other prominent German officers serving in this period included engineer officer Auler, supply officer Fleischer, and Captain Hauschild, who taught military history between 1896 and 1903. Although the stagnation following Colmar Freiherr von der Goltz's departure saw some momentum with the arrival of new German officers in 1901, mutual dissatisfaction persisted. While German officers complained about a lack of receptiveness, Ottoman political and military circles grew critical of the mission, arguing that substantial financial expenditures failed to produce the expected organizational progress. Consequently, in late 1903, the German ambassador noted that increasing the number of deployed officers would yield little result. This growing resistance was further evidenced in 1904 when Ditfurth's proposed regimental restructuring for the Military Academy (Mekteb-i Harbiye) was initially accepted but soon abandoned. Ottoman officers sent to Germany underwent rigorous academic screening and were admitted by exam to the Prussian Staff College (Preußische Kriegsakademie). After being graduated from the staff curriculum and being a general staff officer (Erkân-ı Harb Zâbiti) in the Prussian Army, these officers had administrative difficulties about rank equalization and salary equality when they returned to the Ottoman Army, as in the diplomatic correspondences of the Ottoman Embassy in Berlin.

To establish a continuous educational pipeline for the officer corps, the Ottoman military education system was structured hierarchically. The foundation of modern military middle schools (Askerî Rüştiye) originated with the establishment of preparatory schools (Mahreç-i Mekteb-i Askeriye) in 1864 under Sultan Abdülaziz. Due to institutional inadequacies in feeding the military high schools (Askerî İdadi), these preparatory institutions were abolished by a Grand Vizieral decree on 9 January 1875 and replaced with specialized military middle schools. Funding was redirected by closing down the underperforming Mekteb-i Osmanî in Paris. This reform consolidated a four-tier progressive education ladder: military middle schools (rüştiye), military high schools (idadi), the military academy (harbiye), and the staff college (erkân-ı harbiye), which formed the elite apex of staff officer selection. The curriculum at the preparatory middle-school level reflected a synthesis of traditional subjects, basic sciences, and European languages. In the 1891 standardized curriculum, strong emphasis was placed on mathematics (hesap), technical drawing (resim), and geography alongside religious instruction. Foreign language training was systematically prioritized from the second year onward, allocating extensive coursework to French alongside Arabic and Persian to prepare officer candidates for advanced technical and strategic education at higher military academies.

==== Foreign Training and German Attachment ====
Under bilateral military agreements, selected Ottoman officers were dispatched to Germany for advanced training. Official records indicate that officers such as Şakir Bey and Tevfik Efendi were attached to Prussian units—including the 1st Dragoon Regiment—and admitted into General Staff classes by decree of the German Emperor.

== Leadership ==
=== Seraskers during the reign of Abdul Hamid II (1876–1908) ===
No.	Portrait	Serasker	Took office	Left office	Time in office
1	Redif Pasha	Field marshal Redif Pasha (1836–1905)	September 1876	28 July 1877	330 days
2	Mahmud Celâleddin Pasha [tr]	Field marshal Mahmud Celâleddin Pasha (1836–1884)	28 July 1877	23 August 1877	26 days
3	Mustafa Sıdkı Pasha	Field marshal Mustafa Sıdkı Pasha	23 August 1877	December 1877	100 days
4	Mehmed Rauf Pasha	Field marshal Mehmed Rauf Pasha (1832–1908)	December 1877	19 April 1878	139 days
5	Mehmed İzzet Pasha	Field marshal Mehmed İzzet Pasha	19 April 1878	18 May 1878	29 days
(2)	Mahmud Celâleddin Pasha [tr]	Field marshal Mahmud Celâleddin Pasha (1836–1884)	18 May 1878	7 June 1878	20 days
(3)	Mustafa Sıdkı Pasha	Field marshal Mustafa Sıdkı Pasha	7 June 1878	December 1878	177 days
6	Gazi Osman Pasha	Field marshal Gazi Osman Pasha (1832–1900)	December 1878	July 1880	1 year, 213 days
7	Hüseyin Hüsnü Pasha(As Minister of War)	Field marshal Hüseyin Hüsnü Pasha (As Minister of War) (1856–1926)	July 1880	January 1881	184 days
(6)	Gazi Osman Pasha(As Minister of War)	Field marshal Gazi Osman Pasha (As Minister of War) (1832–1900)	January 1881	30 November 1882	1 year, 333 days
(7)	Hüseyin Hüsnü Pasha(As Minister of War)	Field marshal Hüseyin Hüsnü Pasha (As Minister of War) (1856–1926)	30 November 1882	3 December 1882	3 days
(6)	Gazi Osman Pasha	Field marshal Gazi Osman Pasha (1832–1900)	3 December 1882	10 September 1885	2 years, 281 days
8	Ali Saib Pasha	Field marshal Ali Saib Pasha (1827–1891)	10 September 1885	21 August 1891	5 years, 345 days
(6)	Gazi Osman Pasha	Field marshal Gazi Osman Pasha (1832–1900)	21 August 1891	September 1891	15 days
9	Mehmed Rıza Pasha	Field marshal Mehmed Rıza Pasha (1844–1920)	September 1891	23 July 1908	16 years, 322 days

=== Chiefs of the General Staff ===
No.	Portrait	Chiefs of the General Staff	Took office	Left office	Time in office
1	Ahmed Izzet Pasha	Ahmed Izzet Pasha (1864–1937)	23 July 1908	11 June 1913	4 years, 323 days
2	Mehmed Hâdî Pasha	Mehmed Hâdî Pasha (1861–1932)	11 June 1913	3 January 1914	206 days
3	Enver Pasha	Enver Pasha (1881–1922)	3 January 1914	14 October 1918	4 years, 284 days
(1)	Ahmed Izzet Pasha	Ahmed Izzet Pasha (1864–1937)	14 October 1918	3 November 1918	20 days
4	Cevat Pasha	Cevat Pasha (1870–1938)	3 November 1918	24 December 1918	51 days
5	Fevzi Pasha	Fevzi Pasha (1876–1950)	24 December 1918	14 May 1919	141 days
(4)	Cevat Pasha	Cevat Pasha (1870–1938)	14 May 1919	2 August 1919	80 days
(2)	Mehmed Hâdî Pasha	Mehmed Hâdî Pasha (1861–1932)	2 August 1919	12 September 1919	41 days
6	Fuat Pasha	Fuat Pasha	12 September 1919	9 October 1919	27 days
(4)	Cevat (Çobanlı) Pasha	Cevat (Çobanlı) Pasha (1870–1938)	9 October 1919	16 February 1920	130 days
7	Shevket Turgut Pasha	Shevket Turgut Pasha (1862–1924)	16 February 1920	2 May 1920	76 days
(2)	Mehmed Hâdî Pasha	Mehmed Hâdî Pasha (1861–1932)	2 May 1920	13 May 1920	11 days
8	Abuk Ahmed Pasha	Abuk Ahmed Pasha (1857–1923)	13 May 1920	23 October 1920	163 days
9	Zeki (Kolaç) Pasha	Zeki (Kolaç) Pasha (1862–1943)	23 October 1920	4 November 1922	2 years, 12 days

== Bibliography ==
- Efe, İsmail (2015). "1914 Yılı Başından Birinci Dünya Savaşı'na Orduyu Modernleştirme Çabaları Ve Türk-Alman İttifakı". Kırıkkale Üniversitesi Sosyal Bilimler Dergisi (in Turkish). DergiPark. Archived from the original on 1 April 2024.
- Kara, Hidayet (2020). Sultan II. Abülhamid dönemi Osmanlı Kara Ordusu (1876-1908) (in Turkish). Ankara: Türk Tarih Kurumu. ISBN 9789751744463.
- Ünal, Uğur (2016). Sultan Abdülaziz Devri Osmanlı Kara Ordusu (1861-1876). Ankara: Türk Tarih Kurumu. ISBN 9789751631695.
- Kış, Salih (25 December 2017). Osmanlı Ordusunda Alman Ekolü Von Der Goltz Paşa (1883-1895). PALET YAYINLARI. ISBN 9786052338377.
- Çifci, Erhan (2022). Prusya'dan NATO'ya Türk Ordusunda Batı Etkisi. İstanbul: Kronik Yayınevi. ISBN 9786258431940.
- Akmeşe, Handan Nezir (2005). The Birth of Modern Turkey: The Ottoman Military and the March to World War I. London: I.B. Tauris. ISBN 978-1-85043-797-0.
- Ateş, Barış (2022). "Military Advisory Missions and The Turkish Professional Military Education: An Uneasy Relationship". The Journal of Diplomatic Research. 4 (1): 35–52.
- Erickson, Edward J. (2003). Defeat in Detail: The Ottoman Army in the Balkans, 1912–1913. Westport, CT: Praeger. ISBN 978-0-275-97888-4.
- Uyar, Mesut; Erickson, Edward J. (2009). A Military History of the Ottomans: From Osman to Atatürk. Santa Barbara, CA: Praeger Security International. ISBN 978-0-275-98876-0.
- Wallach, Jehuda L. (1976). Anatomie einer Militärhilfe: Neue Forschungen zur deutsch-türkischen Militärgeschichte. Düsseldorf: Droste Verlag. ISBN 978-3-7700-0441-6.
- Yasamee, F. A. K. (1998). "Colmar Freiherr von der Goltz and the Rebirth of the Ottoman Empire". Diplomacy & Statecraft. 9 (2): 91–128. doi:10.1080/09592299808406084.
- Topal, Ali E. (December 2013). The Effects of German Military Commission and Balkan Wars on the Reorganization and Modernization of the Ottoman Army (PDF) (Master of Arts in Security Studies (Defense Decision Making and Planning) Thesis). Monterey, California: Naval Postgraduate School.

== See also ==
- Ministry of War (Ottoman Empire)
- Ministry of the General Staff (Turkey)
- General Staff of the Turkish Armed Forces
