= Black Musa =

Ottoman soldier and amir

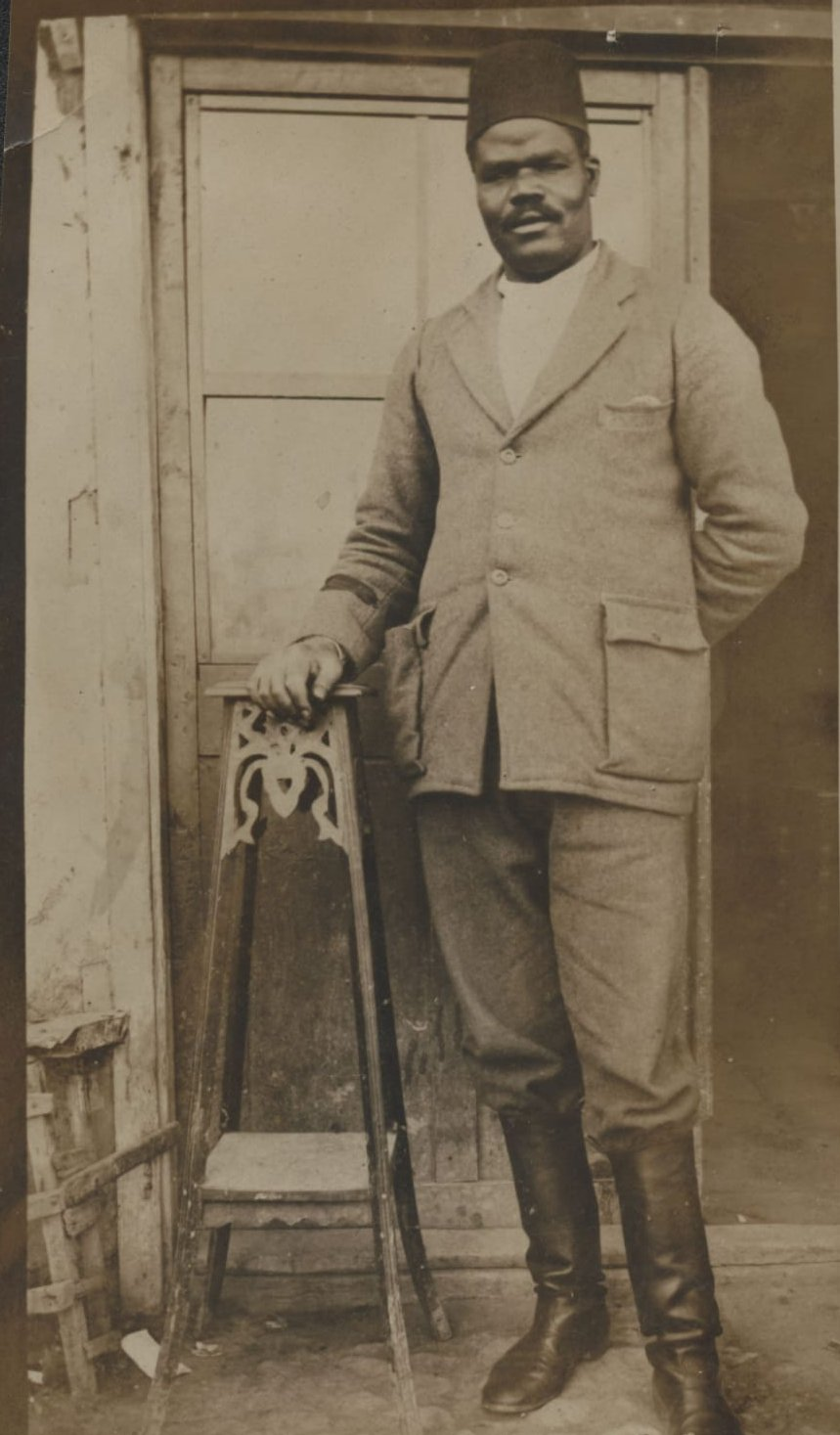
- Born: 1880; Ottoman Crete, Ottoman Empire (now Crete, Greece)
- Died: 1919 (aged 38–39); Üsküdar, Constantinople, Ottoman Empire (now Istanbul, Turkey)
- Other names: Musa Bey, Sudanese Black Musa Bey, Black Moses
- Occupation: Intelligence officer

Black Musa (Turkish: Zenci Musa) or Sudanli Zenci Musa Bey (1880–1919) was a member of the Special Organization and a volunteer soldier in the Ottoman Empire; he participated in every war involving the empire from the Italo-Turkish War to World War I. He is known as Eşref Sencer Kuşçubaşı's aide and amir.

== Life ==
Black Musa was born in Crete in 1880. He was originally from Sudan. Upon his father's death, who he was living with in Crete, he moved to Cairo with his grandfather, who was an Ottoman enthusiast, and grew up in a neighborhood with Turks. Musa became fluent in Turkish while living in this neighborhood. He voluntarily participated in the Italo-Turkish War with his grandfather in 1911. While in Tripolitania, he met Kuşçubaşı Eşref, who came to Libya to galvanize the local people against the Italians, and became his amir. After the Italo-Turkish War, he participated in the Balkan Wars, the Sinai-Palestine Campaign, the Campaign in South Arabia during World War I, the Gallipoli campaign, and the Raid on the Suez Canal. According to Kurdish–Turkish historian Cemal Kutay, during the occupation of Istanbul, a British Army general, Charles Harington, offered gold to lure Musa to the side of the British, but Musa did not accept it. He carried out both armed struggles and intelligence activities in the wars he participated in. He died of tuberculosis in 1919 while living in Üsküdar Şeyh Ata Efendi's Özbekler Lodge. His body was buried in the cemetery next to the Özbekler Lodge. Since the burial place still remains undiscovered, an epitaph was built in his memory in a designated place in the cemetery.

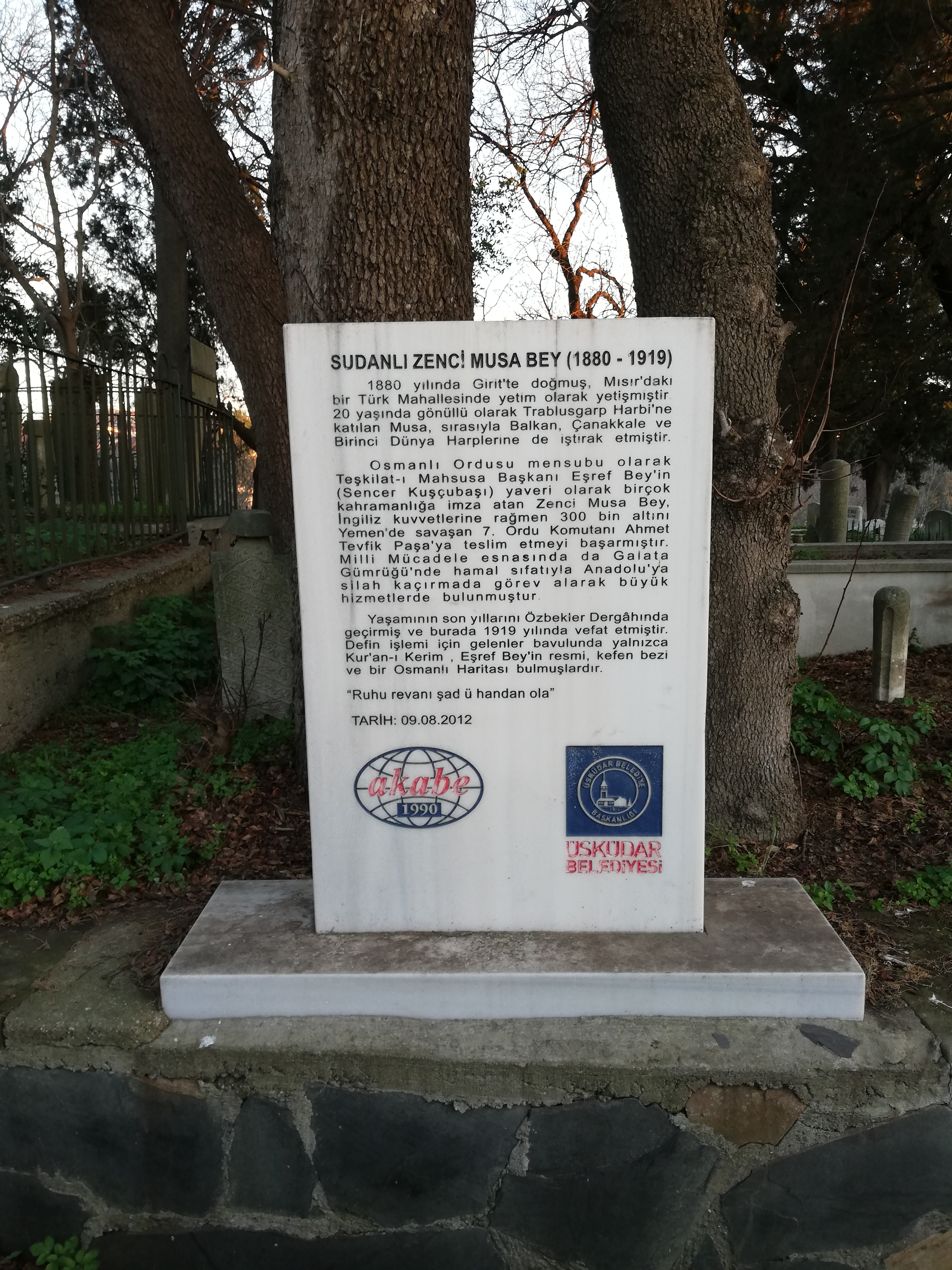
An epitaph built in the memory of Black Musa in the cemetery next to the Üsküdar Özbekler Lodge.

== In popular culture ==
Famed poet, writer, academic, politician, and the author of the Turkish National Anthem, Mehmet Âkif Ersoy, met Black Musa, who was with Eşref Bey, in 1915 during his trip to Arabia. Ersoy later wrote the following lines of poetry about Black Musa:

"Eşref Bey's amir Zenci Musa,
ascended from his shoulder Nebi İsa [Prophet Jesus]"
