= Provisional Government of Western Thrace =

1913 unrecognised state in Southeast Europe

Independent Government of Western Thrace Garbi Trakya Hükûmet-i Müstakilesi غربی تراقیا حكومت مستقله‌سی Batı Trakya Geçici Hükümeti Prosorini Kyvernisi Dytikis Thrakis Προσωρινή Κυβέρνηση Δυτικής Θράκης Vremenno pravitelstvo na Zapadna Trakiya Временно правителство на Западна Тракия
- 1913
- Flag

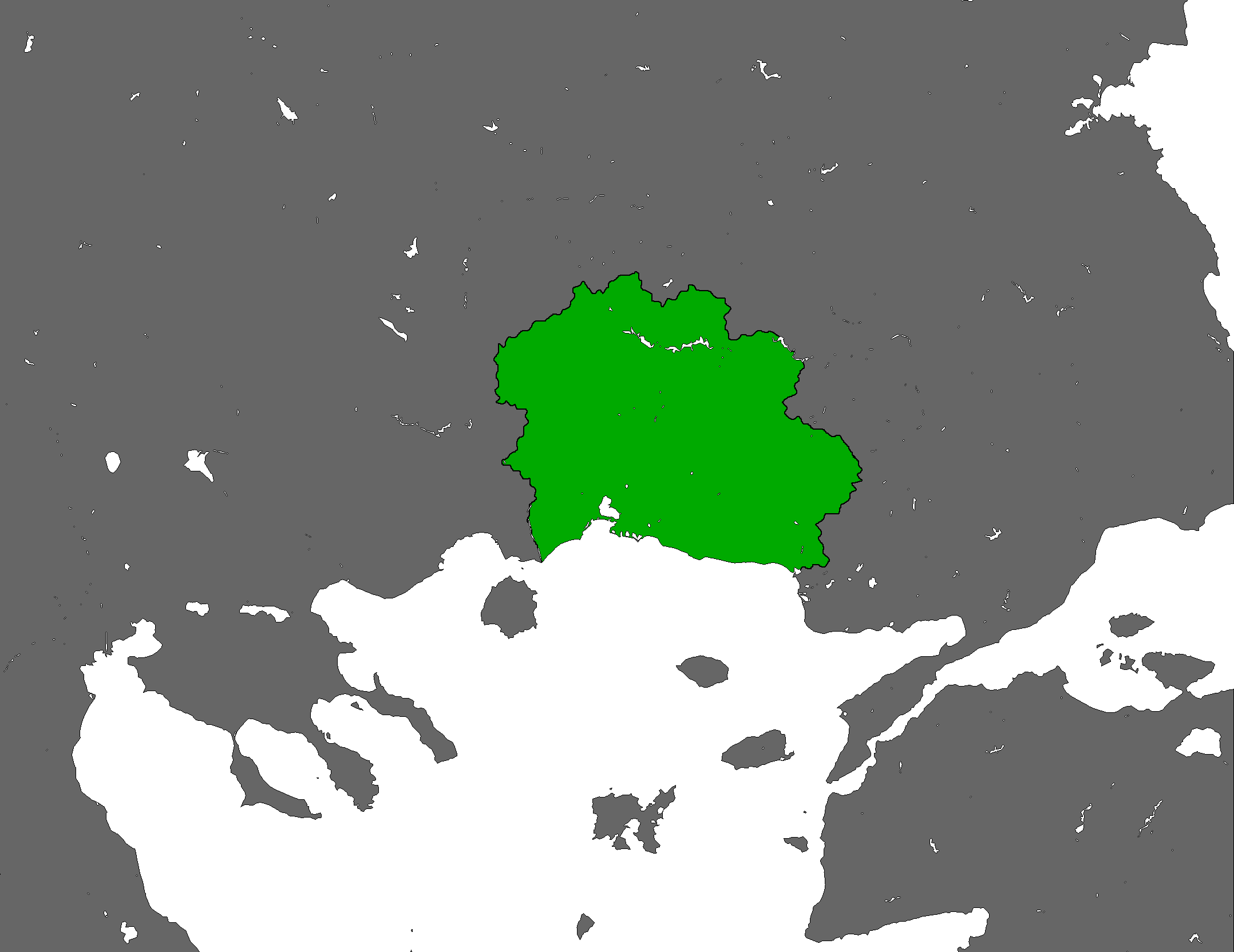
- Independent Government of Western Thrace
- Status: Provisional, later Independent
- Capital: Komotini
- Common languages: Greek, Ottoman Turkish, Bulgarian
- Demonym: Western Thracian
- Government: Provisional Government under a Republic system
  - 1913-1913: Hoca Salih Efendi
- History
  - Established: 31 August 1913
  - Disestablished: 25 October 1913

Area
- 1913: 8,578 km^{2} (3,312 sq mi)
- Currency: Western Thracian Para
| Preceded by | Succeeded by |
| Tsardom of Bulgaria | Tsardom of Bulgaria |
- Today part of: Greece, Bulgaria
- ^{1} Renamed from "Provisional Government of Western Thrace" and some researchers used term of "Republic of Gumuljina" and the "Turkish Republic of Western Thrace".

The Provisional Government of Western Thrace (Note: Ottoman Turkish: غربی تراقیا حكومت موقته‌سی, romanized: Garbi Trakya Hükûmet-i Muvakkatesi; Greek: Προσωρινή Κυβέρνηση Δυτικής Θράκης, romanized: Prosoriní Kyvérnisi Dytikís Thrákis; Turkish: Batı Trakya Geçici Hükümeti) later Independent Government of Western Thrace, (Note: Ottoman Turkish: غربی تراقیا حكومت مستقله‌سی, romanized: Garbi Trakya Hükûmet-i Müstakilesi; Greek: Αυτόνομη Κυβέρνηση Δυτικής Θράκης, romanized: Aftónomi Kyvérnisi Dytikís Thrákis) was a small, short-lived unrecognized republic established in most of Western Thrace and parts of Northern Thrace, from August 31 to October 25, 1913. It encompassed the area surrounded by the rivers Maritsa (Evros) in the east, Mesta (Nestos) in the west, the Rhodope Mountains in the north and the Aegean Sea in the south. Its total territory was approximately 8600 km².

The whole of Western Thrace was captured by Bulgaria during the First Balkan War and awarded to the country by the Treaty of London. During the Second Balkan War the Greek Army captured most of the area between Xanthi (İskeçe) and the Maritsa river south of Soufli without encountering resistance by the overstretched Bulgarian army which retreated to the southern slopes of the Rhodope mountains (several kilometers to the north of Xanthi and Komotini) while the Ottoman forces occupied the regions of Soufli (Sofulu), Didymoteicho (Dimetoka) and Ortaköy. After the Second Balkan War the treaty of Bucharest was signed which returned the area to Bulgaria and the Greek army withdrew from Western Thrace. Thereupon local Muslims and Greeks, with the encouragement of the Greek authorities, refused to recognize Bulgarian control of the area and petitioned the Ottoman army to occupy Western Thrace. On their invitation, the region was then occupied by small Ottoman forces, largely irregulars. While the area had been returned to Bulgaria by the Bucharest treaty, the Bulgarian army wished to avoid conflict with the Ottomans and retreated to a line coinciding with the pre-Balkan war border up to Aydoğmuş and from there along a ridge of the Rhodope mountains running west of Daridere and east of Madan up to the Bulgarian-Greek border.

After the retreat of both the Bulgarian and Greek armies, an autonomous state was declared with Ottoman support, in order to avoid Bulgarian rule after the Treaty of Bucharest, in which the Ottomans had not taken part. Under British pressure, the Bulgarians and the Ottomans signed the Treaty of Constantinople, which satisfied the Turkish claims to recognition of Eastern Thrace and recognized Western Thrace as part of Bulgaria. The Ottomans withdrew their forces and by 25 October, and the area was returned by Bulgaria. The southern part of the former Provisional government was occupied in 1918 by French forces. This area was finally annexed by Greece in 1920 and has been part of that country ever since, except for the Bulgarian occupation between 1941 and 1944. The northern part of the former Provisional Government remained part of Bulgaria after 1919.

The capital of Provisional Government of Western Thrace was Gümülcine, now Komotini, in Greece.

After the retreat of the Bulgarian army, irregular Ottoman forces committed numerous atrocities against Bulgarian civilians, including multiple cases of mass murder and the expulsion of a large part of the Bulgarian population of the region, similar to the atrocities carried out in Eastern Thrace during the Second Balkan War. These atrocities continued after the formation of the government of Western Thrace, with the active participation and support of its government.

== Overview ==
President: Hoca Salih Efendi.

Army: Standing force of 29,170, largely infantry. Commander of the Armed Forces was Süleyman Askerî Bey.

Steering Committee: Reshid Bey, Raif Effendi, Hafous Salih Effendi, Nicodimos (commissioner of the Diocese of Maroneia, representing the Greeks), Mikirditch Tabakian (Armenian), Yaka Cassavi (Jew), Hafous Galip and Eshref Bey Kushchubasi.

As soon as independence was declared, the Provisional Government of Western Thrace determined the borders of the country, put up the new flags on the official buildings, commissioned a national anthem, raised an army, published its own stamps and passports, and prepared the budget of the new country.

A Jewish citizen, Samuel Karaso, was tasked by the government with establishing an official press agency and to publish a newspaper named Müstakil ("Independent") in Turkish and French. The Ottoman Laws and Regulations were adopted without any change, and the cases started to be heard by the Court of Western Thrace.

Currency 40 Paras = 1 Piaster

== See also ==
- Republic of Tamrash
- Muslim minority of Greece
- Turks of Western Thrace
- Greek Muslims
