= Esad Pasha =

Esad Pasha or Essad Pasha may refer to:

- As'ad Pasha al-Azm (died 1758), Ottoman governor of Damascus
- Ahmed Esad Pasha (1828–1875), Ottoman statesman
- Essad Pasha Toptani (1863–1920), Ottoman and Albanian politician
- Mehmet Esat Bülkat or Mehmed Esad Pasha (1862–1952), Ottoman general
- Esatpaşa, Ataşehir, a neighborhood in Istanbul
