= Süleyman Askerî =

Military officer who served in the Ottoman Army

Süleyman Askerî Bey
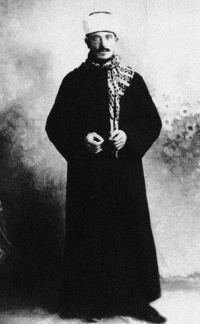
- Born: 1884; Prizren, Kosovo Vilayet, Ottoman Empire
- Died: 14 April 1915 (aged 30–31); Berjisiya, Basra Vilayet, Ottoman Empire
- Cause of death: Suicide
- Military career
- Allegiance: Ottoman Empire
- Service years: 1902–1915
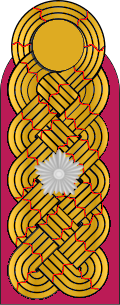
- Rank: Kaymakam
- Commands: Chief of staff of the Bingazi Area Command (Aziz Ali), Staff officer of the X Corps, Chief of Staff of Trabzon Redif Division, Chief of the Special Organization, Commander of the Iraq Area Command (Governor of Basra Vilayet)
- Conflicts: Italo-Turkish War; Balkan Wars; First World War
- Other work: Chief of the General Staff of the Provisional Government of Western Thrace

Süleyman Askerî Bey, also known as Suleyman Askeri, Sulayman Askari, Sulaiman al-Askari (Adyghe: Сулейман Аскэрбий, romanized: Suleyman Askərbiy; Turkish: Süleyman Askeri) and unofficially known as Suleyman Askeri Pasha (1884 – 14 April 1915), was a military officer who served in the Ottoman Army. Askerî was of Circassian descent and co founder of the Teşkilât-ı Mahsusa (Special Organisation), a group involved in guerrilla warfare.

== Life ==
Süleyman Askerî was born to General Vehbi Pasha, who served as military staff at Edirne in 1898 and then in Anatolia, in 1884 in Prizren. He graduated from the Ottoman Military Academy in 1902 and graduated from the Ottoman Military College on 5 November 1905 as Distinguished Captain (Mümtaz Yüzbaşı ).

He was assigned to Monastir (present-day Bitola) under the command of the Third Army stationed at Salonica (present-day Thessaloniki). During the days he stayed in Monastir, he joined the Committee of Union and Progress and he married Fadime Hanım, who was an aristocrat of Filibe (present-day Plovdiv). They had two daughters, Fatma and Dilek. During the Young Turk Revolution (1908), First Lieutenant Atıf Kamçıl stated that he asked the CUP Monastir (modern-day Bitola) branch for a gun and, together with Süleyman Askerî, planned the assassination of Shemsi Pasha. Askerî was closest friend of Kuşçubaşzade Eşref (Sencer). According to Philip Hendrick Stoddard, he was a brother-in-law of Mehmed Nuri (Conker), who was the oldest friend of Mustafa Kemal (Atatürk).

In 1909, he was promoted to the rank of Kolağası and appointed to the gendarmerie regiment in Baghdad. In 1911, after the Kingdom of Italy invaded the vilayet of Tripoli (present-day Libya), he went there and participated in operations in Benghazi. In 1912, he took part in the Balkan Wars as the chief of staff of Trabzon Redif Division and then became the Chief of the General Staff of the provisional government (31 August 1913 – 25 October 1913) established in Western Thrace. On 13 November 1913, he was appointed to the chief of the Ottoman Special Organisation when it was officially formed.

An attack launched near Shu’aybah in mid-April ended in failure, with many of the irregular forces bolting in search of safety. His forces suffered 3,000 casualties while another 800 were taken prisoner. With his army routed, Askerî, who was dejected, wounded, and facing up to the failure of his mission, committed suicide.

== See also ==
- Battle of Shaiba

== Sources ==
Military offices
Preceded by -	Chief of the Special Organization; 27 November 1913 – 14 April 1915	Succeeded by Ali Başhampa
Preceded by -	Commander of the Iraq Area Command; 20 December 1914 – 14 April 1915	Succeeded by Nureddin Bey
