= Ministry of War (Ottoman Empire) =

Imperial ministry of the Ottoman Empire

- (Ottoman Turkish: حربیه نظارتی); Harbiye Nezâreti

Agency overview
- Formed: 1826
- Superseding agency: Ministry of National Defense of the Republic of Turkey
- Jurisdiction: Ottoman Empire
- Headquarters: Constantinople
- Minister responsible: Enver Pasha ( 1914 - 1918 )

The Ministry of War (Ottoman Turkish: حربیه نظارتی; Turkish: Harbiye Nezareti, often shortened to Harbiye) was responsible for war affairs in the Ottoman Empire. The Ottoman land forces were subordinate to this ministry. Within the ministry there were offices for procurement, combat arms, peacetime military affairs, mobilization, and for promotions.

After the Auspicious Incident in 1826, a modern War Ministry was established within the Serasker's department. The Ministry of War was established in 1908 after the Young Turk Revolution.

The Ministry of War was responsible for carrying out the administrative acts of the army. While the ministry handled the political and logistical aspects of defense, the strategic command and operational management of the army were conducted by the Ottoman General Staff (Ottoman Turkish: Erkân-ı Harbiye-i Umûmiye Riyaseti), which functioned under the Ministry of War after 1908. The Minister of War had to have the rank of pasha. The management of the Naval Forces was under the Ministry of Naval Affairs, which was established separately from the Ministry of War. After the start of the Turkish War of Independence, this ministry was replaced by the Ministry of National Defense. The War Ministry headquarters was located in the Fatih district of Istanbul and is currently used by Istanbul University.

== List of War Ministers since 1908 ==
No.	Portrait	Minister of War	Took office	Left office	Time in office
1	Ömer Rüşdü Paşa [tr]	Ömer Rüşdü Paşa (1843–1922)	23 July 1908	7 August 1908	15 days
2	Rexhep Pasha Mati	Rexhep Pasha Mati (1842–1908)	7 August 1908	21 August 1908 †	14 days
3	Ali Rıza Pasha	Ali Rıza Pasha (1860–1932)	21 August 1908	28 April 1909	250 days
4	Salih Hulusi Pasha	Salih Hulusi Pasha (1864–1939)	28 April 1909	12 January 1910	259 days
5	Mahmud Şevket Pasha	Mahmud Şevket Pasha (1856–1913)	12 January 1910	29 July 1912	2 years, 199 days
6	Nazim Pasha	Nazim Pasha	29 July 1912	22 January 1913 †	177 days
(5)	Mahmud Şevket Pasha	Mahmud Şevket Pasha (1856–1913)	23 January 1913	11 June 1913	140 days
7	Ahmed Izzet Pasha	Ahmed Izzet Pasha (1864–1937)	18 June 1913	5 October 1913	109 days
8	Çürüksulu Mahmud Pasha	Çürüksulu Mahmud Pasha (1864–1931)	5 October 1913	3 January 1914	90 days
9	Enver Pasha	Enver Pasha (1881–1922)	3 January 1914	4 October 1918	4 years, 274 days
(7)	Ahmed Izzet Pasha	Ahmed Izzet Pasha (1864–1937)	14 October 1918	11 November 1918	28 days
10	Kölemen Abdullah Pasha	Kölemen Abdullah Pasha (1846–1937)	11 November 1918	19 December 1918	38 days
11	Cevat Çobanlı	Cevat Çobanlı (1870–1938)	19 December 1918	13 January 1919	25 days
12	Ömer Yaver Paşa [tr]	Ömer Yaver Paşa (1861–1931)	13 January 1919	24 February 1919	42 days
13	Ali Ferid Pasha	Ali Ferid Pasha	24 February 1919	4 March 1919	8 days
14	Abuk Ahmed Paşa [tr]	Abuk Ahmed Paşa (1859–1923)	4 March 1919	2 April 1919	29 days
15	Mehmet Şakir Pasha [tr]	Mehmet Şakir Pasha (1855–1919)	2 April 1919	19 May 1919	47 days
16	Shevket Turgut Pasha	Shevket Turgut Pasha (1857–1924)	19 May 1919	29 June 1919	41 days
(13)	Ali Ferid Pasha	Ali Ferid Pasha	29 May 1919	21 July 1919	22 days
17	Mustafa Nazım Pasha	Mustafa Nazım Pasha			
18	Süleyman Şefik Pasha	Süleyman Şefik Pasha (1860–1946)	13 August 1919	2 October 1919	50 days
19	Cemal Mersinli	Cemal Mersinli (1860–1946)	12 October 1919	21 January 1920	101 days
(4)	Salih Hulusi Pasha	Salih Hulusi Pasha (1864–1939)	21 January 1920	3 February 1920	13 days
20	Fevzi Çakmak	Fevzi Çakmak (1876–1950)	3 February 1920	5 April 1920	62 days
–	Damat Ferid Pasha	Damat Ferid Pasha (1853–1923); Acting	5 April 1920	10 June 1920	66 days
21	Ahmet Hamdi Pasha	Ahmet Hamdi Pasha	10 June 1920	30 July 1920	50 days
22	Hüseyin Hüsnü Pasha [tr]	Hüseyin Hüsnü Pasha	31 July 1920	21 October 1920	82 days
23	Çürüksulu Ziya Pasha [tr]	Çürüksulu Ziya Pasha (1870–1940)	21 October 1920	4 November 1922	2 years, 14 days

== War Council ==
No.	Portrait	Chief of the General Staff	Took office	Left office	Time in office
1	Ahmed Izzet Pasha	Ahmed Izzet Pasha (1864–1937)	15 August 1908	1 January 1914	5 years, 139 days
2	Enver Pasha	Enver Pasha (1881–1922)	3 January 1914	4 October 1918	4 years, 274 days
(1)	Ahmed Izzet Pasha	Ahmed Izzet Pasha (1864–1937)	4 October 1918	3 November 1918	30 days
3	Cevat Çobanlı	Cevat Çobanlı (1870–1938)	3 November 1918	24 December 1918	51 days
4	Fevzi Çakmak	Fevzi Çakmak (1876–1950)	24 December 1918	14 May 1919	141 days
(3)	Cevat Çobanlı	Cevat Çobanlı (1870–1938)	14 May 1919	2 August 1919	80 days
5	Hadi Pasha	Hadi Pasha	2 August 1919	12 September 1919	41 days
6	Ali Fuat Cebesoy	Ali Fuat Cebesoy (1882–1968)	12 September 1919	9 October 1919	27 days
(3)	Cevat Çobanlı	Cevat Çobanlı (1870–1938)	9 October 1919	16 February 1920	130 days
7	Shevket Turgut Pasha	Shevket Turgut Pasha (1857–1924)	16 February 1920	19 April 1920	63 days
8	Nazif Pasha	Nazif Pasha	19 April 1920	2 May 1920	13 days
(5)	Hadi Pasha	Hadi Pasha	2 May 1920	19 May 1920	17 days

== British Naval Mission ==
The British Naval Mission was led by:

- Admiral Douglas Gamble (February 1909 – March 1910)
- Admiral Hugh Pigot Williams (April 1910 – April 1912)
- Admiral Arthur Limpus (April 1912 – September 1914)

== French Gendarmerie Mission ==
French Gendarmerie Mission was led by General Moujen.

== German Military Mission ==
Since the first attempts of Sultan Selim III to modernise the Ottoman Army, Prussia has provided it with military know-how. Colonel von Götze, secret negotiator of the Prussian king and military attaché, already came in 1798 on invitation from the Sultan to inspect Turkish units. Once Sultan Mahmud II (1808-1839), for the same purpose, abolished the old-fashioned Janissary corps in 1826, it was again Prussia who helped reform the military: future Field Marshal Helmuth von Moltke, at the time Captain of the Prussian General Staff, and Lieutenant von Berg from the First Special Regiment, were detached to Istanbul in 1835, where Moltke stayed until 1839. Moltke's fame led to the creation of a myth surrounding his role in the establishment of a historic relation between Turkey in Germany, where in fact his role was rather minor, his main value being in the memoirs he wrote and which became the primary lecture for all Prussian and German officers who followed him to the Ottoman Empire. In 1844, Prussian Colonel Kuczkonski [probably a typo in the source, actually Colonel Fritz von Kuczkowski] arrived in Istanbul, where he helped implement secrets plans designed by the Sultan and aiming at reforming the police in the Turkish capital city. Sultans Abdulmecid (1839-1861) and Abdulaziz (1861-1876) did continue reforming the Army with the help of Prussian know-how, but they preferred hiring retired officers who trained and commanded Turkish units, prominently during the Crimean War (1853-1856). Finally, Sultan Abdulhamid II (1876-1908) introduced the official Prussian (German) Military Committees in the Ottoman Empire. In his and Bismarck's time, Germany appeared to be the only European Power that not interested in expanding into Ottoman territory. After 1880, Abdulhamid began a sustained policy of bringing German military and civilian officers to his realm, and of putting them in a leading position in the effort of reforming the Army. As a result, several German officers arrived between 1882 and 1883, including Colonel Kähler as Head of Commission, followed in this position between 1883 and 1895 by Major Baron Colmar von der Goltz, who would stay in the Ottoman Empire almost uninterruptedly until his death in April 1916 in Baghdad. Kähler, as aide-de-camp to the Sultan, as well as the other Germans became highly-paid Ottoman officers, but the body that paid their salaries was controlled by European bankers, and they served without cutting their ties with the German army. Von der Goltz was most influential by reorganising the military education and infrastructure. He was the only German officer who managed to influence Turkish generals, who viewed with displeasure the aloof attitude of Kähler's group. Von der Goltz also managed to influence the decisions of the Ottomans when it came to arm deals towards buying German, rather than British weapons.

The German military mission became the third most important command center (Sultan, Minister of War, Head of Mission) for the Ottoman Army.

The initial contact was established during the Balkan Wars by Grand Vizier Said Halim Pasha and Minister of War Ahmed Izzet Pasha. The Kaiser Wilhelm II sent the mission of General Colmar Freiherr von der Goltz, which served two periods in Turkey within two years (8 months total).

The German mission was accredited from 27 October 1913 to 1918. General Otto Liman von Sanders, previously commander of the 22nd Division, was assigned by the Kaiser Wilhelm II to Constantinople. Germany considered an Ottoman-Russian war to be imminent, and Liman von Sanders was a general with excellent knowledge of the Imperial Russian Army.

The Ottoman Empire was undecided about which side to take in a future war involving the German Empire, British Empire, French Third Republic and Russian Empire, eventually joining the Central Powers led by the German Empire. The 9th article of the German Military Mission stated that in case of a war the contract would be annulled.
