= 1915 =

1915 in various calendars
- Gregorian calendar: 1915; MCMXV
- Ab urbe condita: 2668
- Armenian calendar: 1364; ԹՎ ՌՅԿԴ
- Assyrian calendar: 6665
- Baháʼí calendar: 71–72
- Balinese saka calendar: 1836–1837
- Bengali calendar: 1321–1322
- Berber calendar: 2865
- British Regnal year: 5 Geo. 5 – 6 Geo. 5
- Buddhist calendar: 2459
- Burmese calendar: 1277
- Byzantine calendar: 7423–7424
- Chinese calendar: 甲寅年 (Wood Tiger); 4612 or 4405 — to — 乙卯年 (Wood Rabbit); 4613 or 4406
- Coptic calendar: 1631–1632
- Discordian calendar: 3081
- Ethiopian calendar: 1907–1908
- Hebrew calendar: 5675–5676
- Hindu calendars
- Vikram Samvat: 1971–1972
- Shaka Samvat: 1836–1837
- Kali Yuga: 5015–5016
- Holocene calendar: 11915
- Igbo calendar: 915–916
- Iranian calendar: 1293–1294
- Islamic calendar: 1333–1334
- Japanese calendar: Taishō 4 (大正４年)
- Javanese calendar: 1845–1846
- Juche calendar: 4
- Julian calendar: Gregorian minus 13 days
- Korean calendar: 4248
- Minguo calendar: ROC 4 民國4年
- Nanakshahi calendar: 447
- Thai solar calendar: 2457–2458
- Tibetan calendar: ཤིང་ཕོ་སྟག་ལོ་ (male Wood-Tiger); 2041 or 1660 or 888 — to — ཤིང་མོ་ཡོས་ལོ་ (female Wood-Hare); 2042 or 1661 or 889

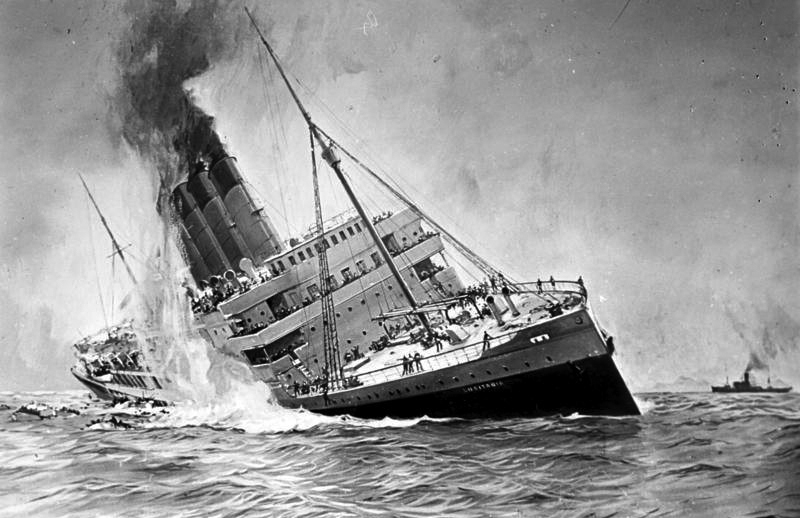
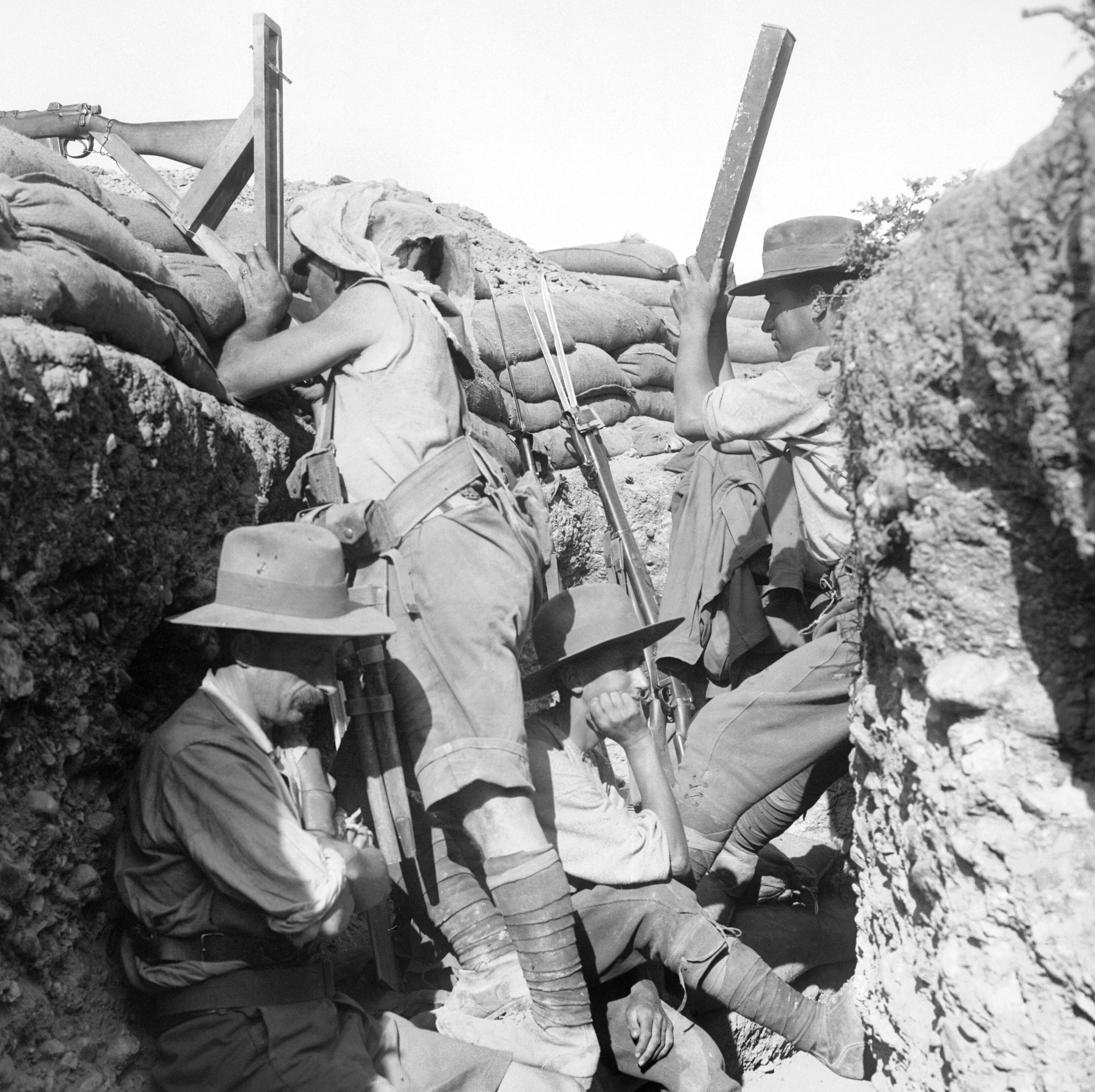
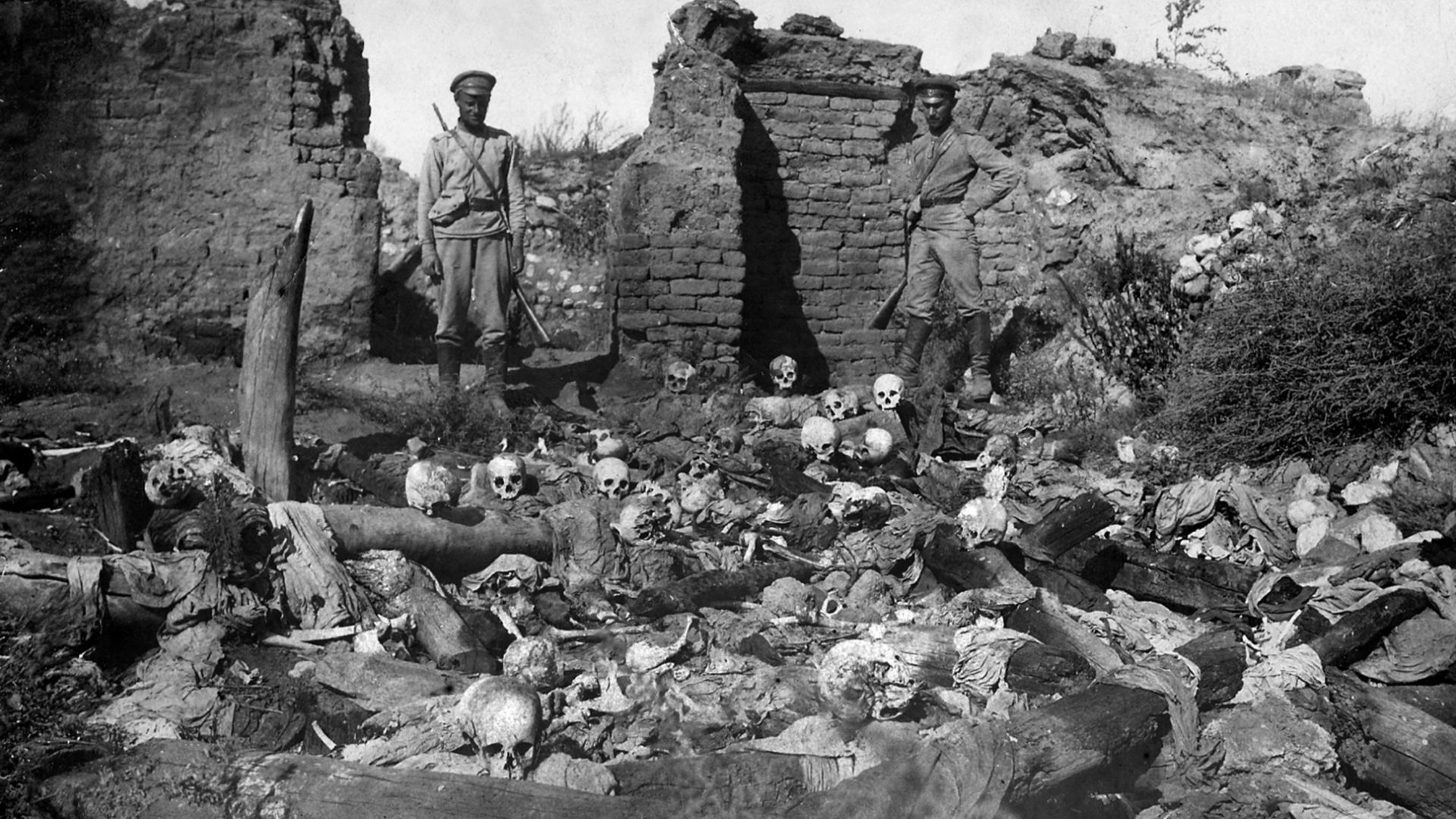
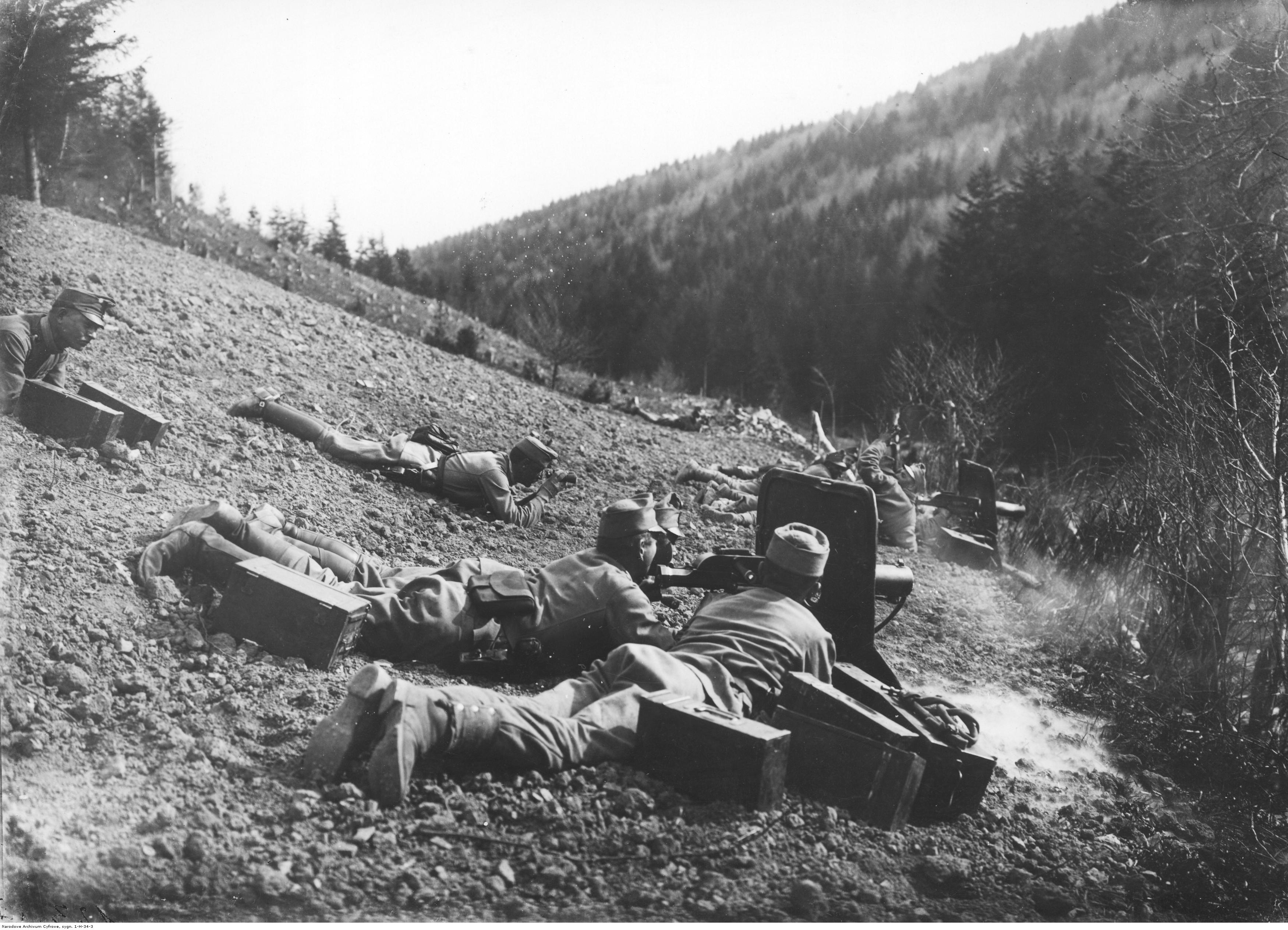
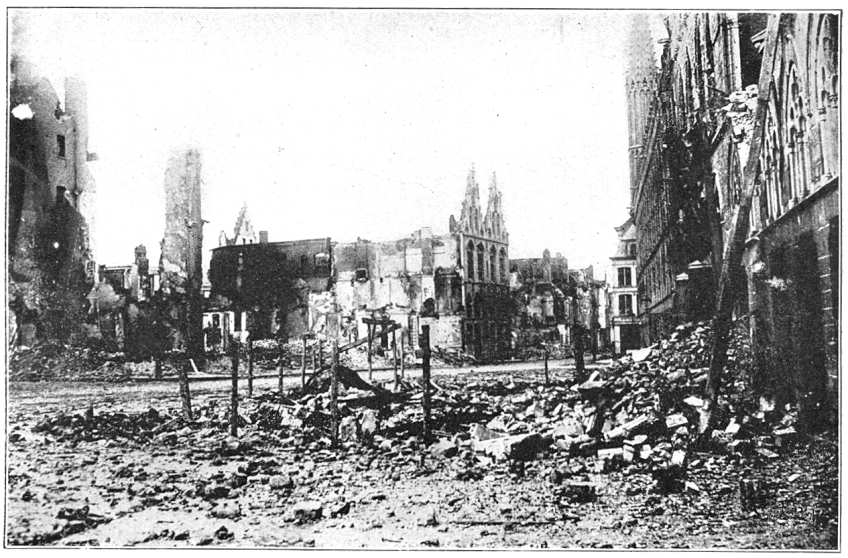
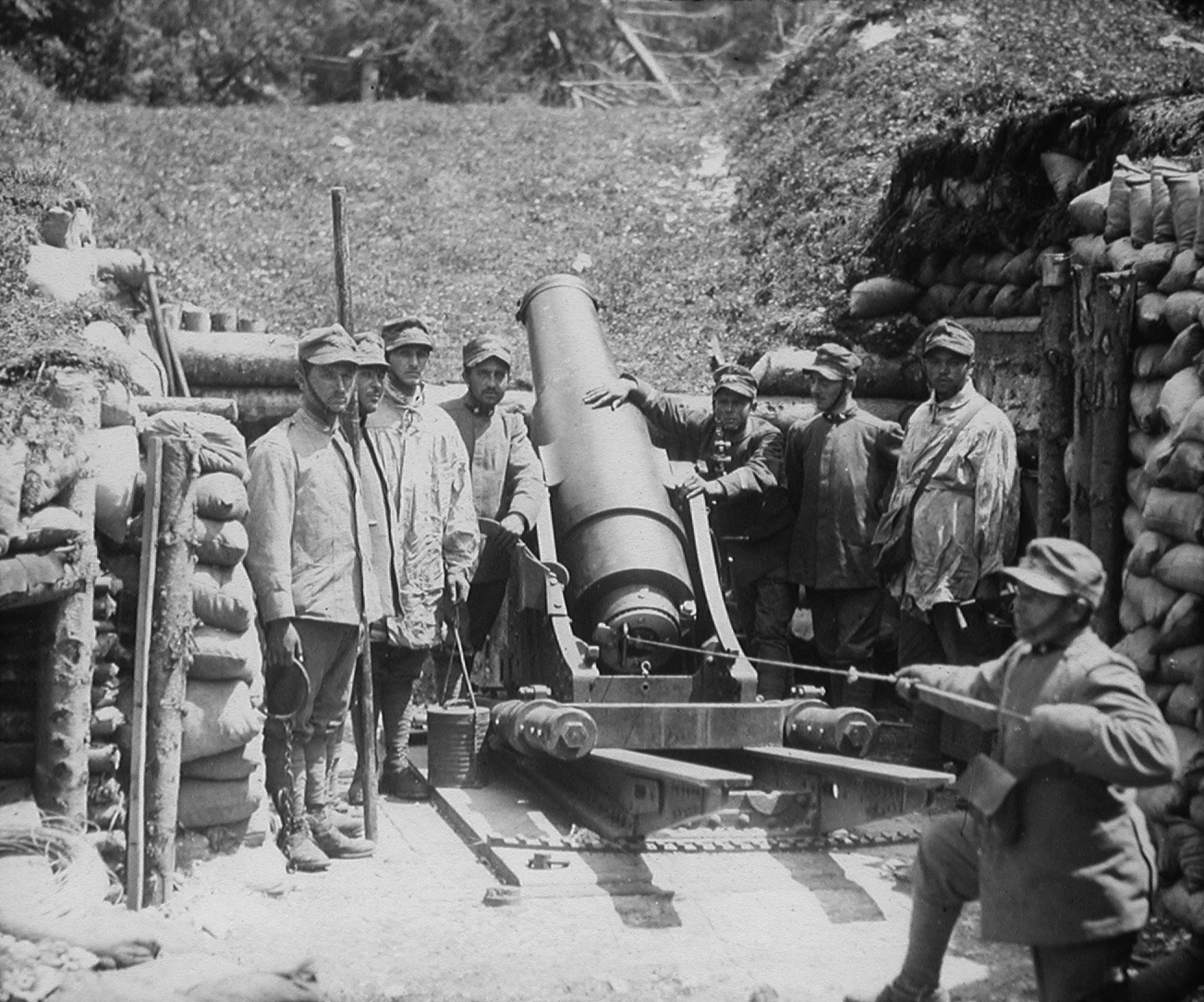
From top to bottom, left to right:
- The Sinking of the RMS Lusitania by a German U-boat kills nearly 1,200 people, including 128 Americans, heightening tensions between Germany and the United States;
- The Gallipoli campaign begins as Allied forces attempt an amphibious invasion of the Ottoman Empire, ending in failure;
- The Armenian genocide starts with the arrest, deportation, and mass extermination of up to 1.5 million Armenians;
- The Gorlice–Tarnów offensive breaks Russian lines in Galicia, shifting the Eastern Front in favor of the Central Powers;
- The Second Battle of Ypres marks the first large-scale use of poison gas on the Western Front;
- Italy joins the Allies, opening the Italian Front against Austria-Hungary.

1915 (MCMXV) was a common year starting on Friday of the Gregorian calendar and a common year starting on Thursday of the Julian calendar, the 1915th year of the Common Era (CE) and Anno Domini (AD) designations, the 915th year of the 2nd millennium, the 15th year of the 20th century, and the 6th year of the 1910s decade. As of the start of 1915, the Gregorian calendar was 13 days ahead of the Julian calendar, which remained in localized use until 1923.

== Events ==
Below, the events of World War I have the "WWI" prefix.

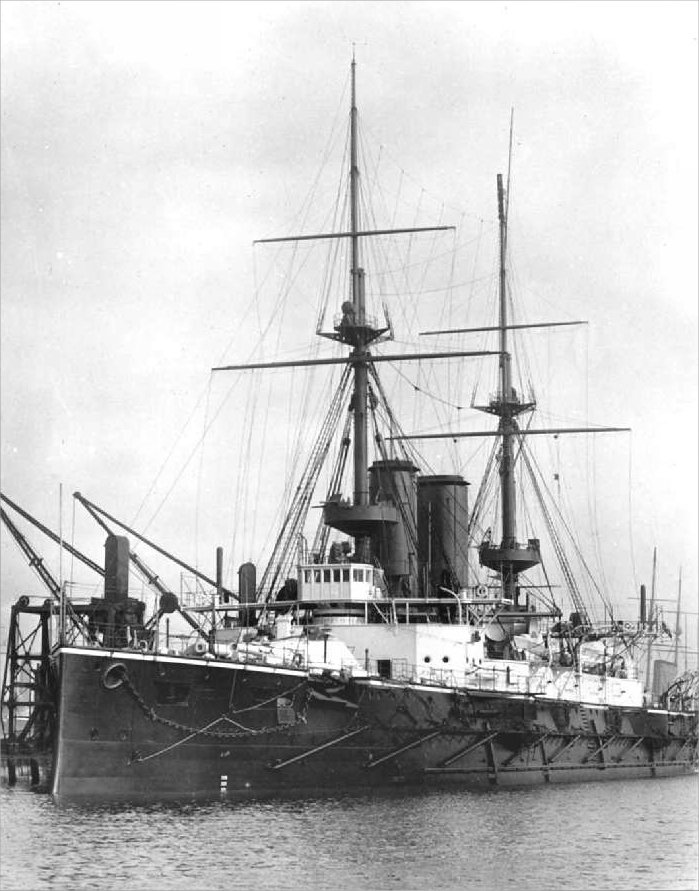
January 1: HMS Formidable, sunk by a German U-boat.

=== January ===
- January – British physicist Sir Joseph Larmor publishes his observations on "The Influence of Local Atmospheric Cooling on Astronomical Refraction".
- January 1
  - WWI: British Royal Navy battleship HMS Formidable is sunk off Lyme Regis, England, by an Imperial German Navy U-boat, with the loss of 547 crew.
  - WWI: Battle of Broken Hill: A train ambush near Broken Hill, Australia, is carried out by two men (claiming to be in support of the Ottoman Empire) who are killed, together with four civilians.
- January 5 – Joseph E. Carberry sets an altitude record of 11,690 feet (3,560 m), carrying Capt. Benjamin Delahauf Foulois as a passenger, in a fixed-wing aircraft.
- January 12
  - The United States House of Representatives rejects a proposal to give women the right to vote.
  - A Fool There Was premières in the United States, starring Theda Bara as a femme fatale; she quickly becomes one of early cinema's most sensational stars.
- January 13 – 1915 Avezzano earthquake hits Italy, around 30,000 people are killed.
- January 17 – WWI: Caucasus Campaign – Battle of Sarikamish: Russia defeats Ottoman Turkey.
- January 18 – Twenty-One Demands from Japan to China are made.
- January 19
  - Georges Claude patents the neon discharge tube for use in advertising.
  - WWI: German Zeppelins bomb the coastal towns of Great Yarmouth and King's Lynn in England for the first time, killing more than 20.
- January 21 – Kiwanis is founded in Detroit, Michigan, as The Supreme Lodge Benevolent Order Brothers.
- January 23 – Chilembwe uprising: Baptist minister John Chilembwe initiates an ultimately unsuccessful uprising against British colonial rule in Nyasaland (modern-day Malawi).
- January 24 – WWI: Battle of Dogger Bank – The British Grand Fleet defeats the German High Seas Fleet, sinking the armoured cruiser SMS Blücher.
- January 25 – The first United States coast-to-coast long-distance telephone call is facilitated by a newly invented vacuum tube amplifier, ceremonially inaugurated by Alexander Graham Bell in New York City and his former assistant Thomas A. Watson, in San Francisco, California.
- January 26
  - WWI: The Ottoman Army begins the Raid on the Suez Canal.
  - The Rocky Mountain National Park is established by an act of the United States Congress.
- January 27 – WWI: French military casualties begin arriving at the Hôpital Temporaire d'Arc-en-Barrois, established earlier in the month by British volunteers.
- January 31 – WWI: Battle of Bolimów – Germany's first large-scale use of poison gas as a weapon occurs, when 18,000 artillery shells containing liquid xylyl bromide tear gas are fired on the Imperial Russian Army, on the Rawka River west of Warsaw; however, freezing temperatures prevent it being effective.

January 28: United States Coast Guard military branch

=== February ===
- February – While working as a cook at New York's Sloane Hospital for Women under an assumed name, "Typhoid Mary" (a asymptomatic carrier of typhoid fever) infects 25 people, and is placed in quarantine for life on March 27.
- February 1 – William Fox creates the Fox Film Corporation.
- February 4 – The Maritz Rebellion of disaffected Boers against the government of the Union of South Africa ends with the surrender of the remaining rebels.
- February 8 – The controversial film, The Birth of a Nation, directed by D. W. Griffith, premieres in Los Angeles. It will be the highest-grossing film for around 25 years.
- February 18 – WWI: Germany regards the waters around the British Isles to be a war zone from this date, as part of its U-boat Campaign.
- February 20 – In San Francisco, the Panama–Pacific International Exposition is opened.
- February 25 – Armenian genocide: The Ottoman Empire transfers Armenians from its armed forces to unarmed Ottoman labour battalions.

=== March ===
- March – The 1915 Palestine locust infestation breaks out in Palestine; it continues until October.
- March 2 – Armenian genocide: Earliest recorded deportations.
- March 10–13 – WWI: Battle of Neuve Chapelle – In the first deliberately planned British offensive of the war, British Indian troops overrun German positions in France, but are unable to sustain the advance.
- March 11 – WWI: British armed merchantman HMS Bayano (1914) is sunk in the North Channel off the coast of Scotland by Imperial German Navy U-boat SM U-27. Around 200 crew are lost, a number of bodies being washed up on the Isle of Man, with only 26 saved.
- March 14 – WWI:
  - Battle of Más a Tierra: Off the coast of Chile, the British Royal Navy forces the Imperial German Navy light cruiser SMS Dresden (last survivor of the German East Asia Squadron) to scuttle.
  - Constantinople Agreement: Britain, France and the Russian Empire agree to give Constantinople (Istanbul) and the Bosphorus to Russia in case of victory (the treaty is later nullified by the Bolshevik Revolution).
- March 18 – WWI:
  - Gallipoli campaign: A Franco-British naval attack on the Dardanelles fails.
  - British Royal Navy battleship HMS Dreadnought (1906) sinks German submarine U-29 with all hands in the Pentland Firth off the coast of Scotland by ramming her, the only time this tactic is known to have been successfully used by a battleship.
- March 19 – Pluto is photographed for the first time, but is not recognised for what it is.

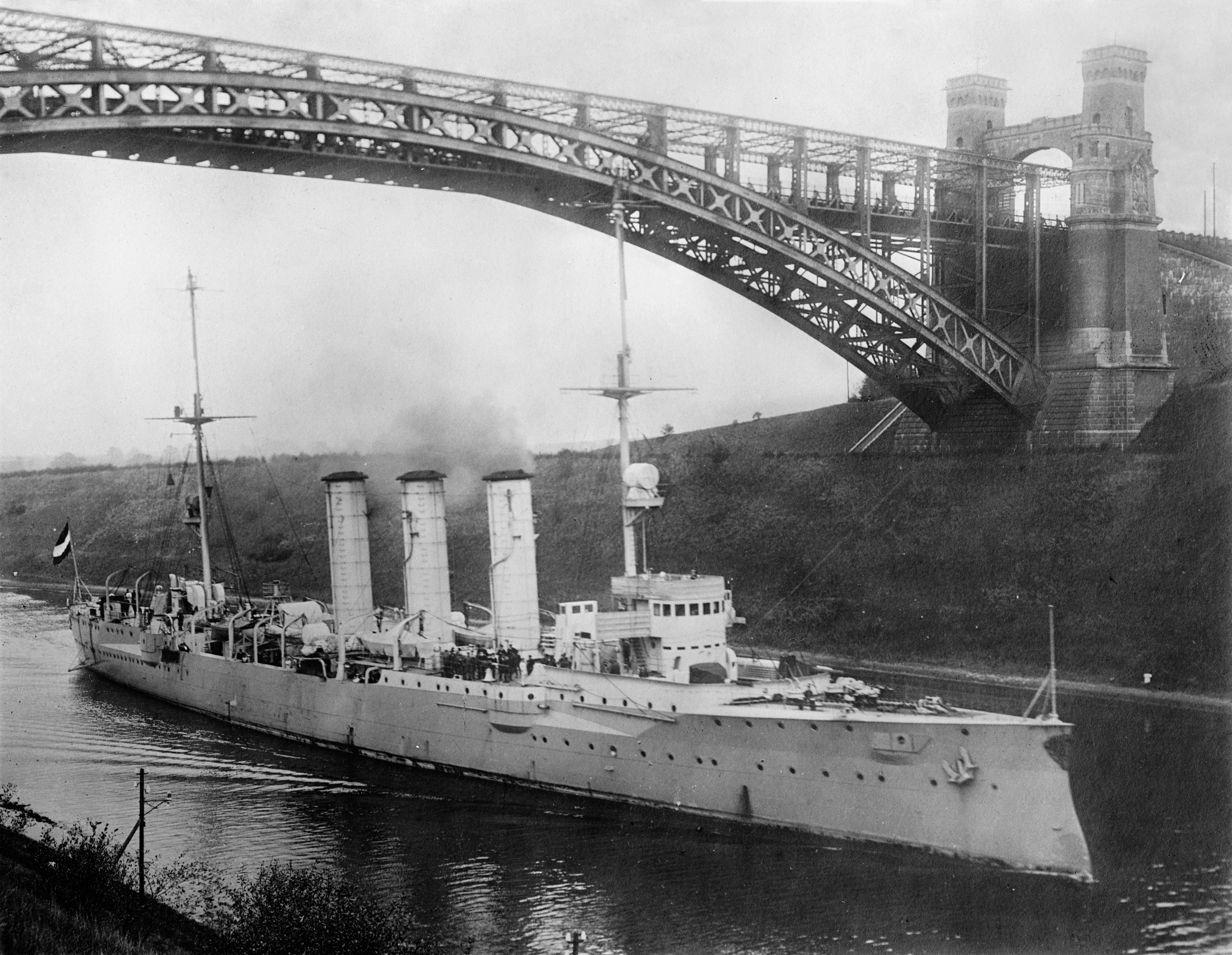
March 14: WWI: SMS Dresden, forced to scuttle by the Royal Navy.

=== April ===
- April 5 – Boxer Jess Willard defeats Jack Johnson with a 26th-round knockout in sweltering heat, at Havana, Cuba. Willard becomes very popular among white Americans, for "bringing back the championship to the white race".
- April 21 – On the orders of Talat Pasha, Haydar Bey organized an expedition against the Assyrians. He killed thousands of Assyrians along with Kurdish tribes.
- April 22 – WWI: Start of Second Battle of Ypres – Germany makes its first large scale use of poison gas on the Western Front.
- April 24 – Armenian genocide: deportation of Armenian notables from Istanbul begins.
- April 25 – WWI: Start of the Gallipoli Campaign by land forces (lasting until January 1916) – A landing at Anzac Cove is conducted by Australian and New Zealand Army Corps, and a landing at Cape Helles by British and French troops, to begin the Allied invasion of the Gallipoli peninsula in the Ottoman Empire.

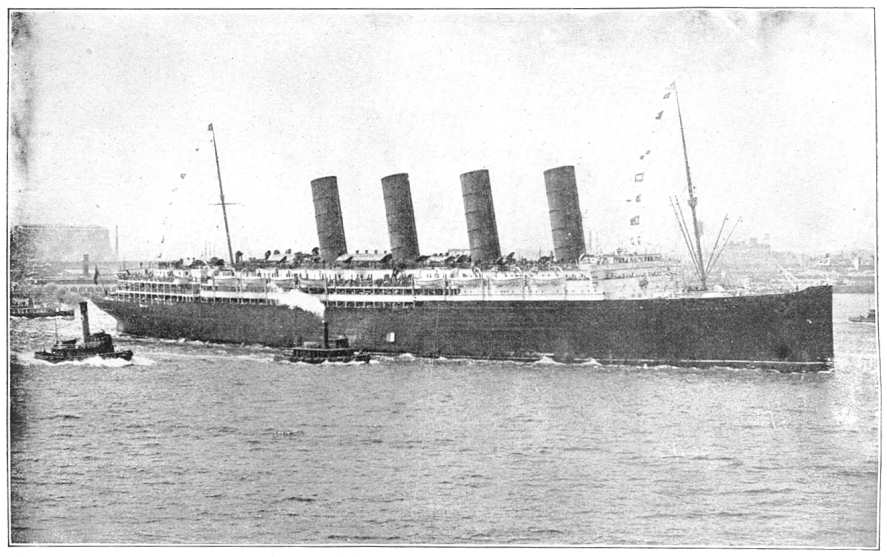
May 7: WWI: RMS Lusitania, sunk by a German U-boat.

- April 26 – Treaty of London: Italy secretly agrees to leave the Triple Alliance with Germany and Austria-Hungary, and join with the Entente Powers, in exchange for certain territories of Austria-Hungary on its borders.

=== May ===
- May 1 – General Louis Botha, Prime Minister of South Africa, leads the army in the occupation of German South West Africa.
- May 5 – WWI: Gallipoli Campaign – Forces of the Ottoman Empire begin shelling ANZAC Cove from a new position behind their lines.
- May 6 – Imperial Trans-Antarctic Expedition: SY Aurora's drift – The SY Aurora breaks loose from its anchorage during a gale, beginning a 312-day ordeal.
- May 7 – WWI
  - Sinking of the RMS Lusitania: RMS Titanic's main rival, the British ocean liner RMS Lusitania, is sunk by Imperial German Navy U-boat U-20 off the south-west coast of Ireland, killing 1,199 civilians en route from New York City to Liverpool. The best-known of the celebrities on board is American sportsman Alfred Gwynne Vanderbilt.
  - Germany captures the Latvian port city of Libau.
- May 9 – WWI – Second Battle of Artois: German and French forces fight to a standstill; German forces defeat the British at the Battle of Aubers Ridge.
- May 17 – The last purely Liberal government in the United Kingdom ends, when the prime minister H. H. Asquith forms an all-party coalition government, the Asquith coalition ministry, effective May 25.
- May 19 – WWI: The third attack on Anzac Cove by Ottoman forces is repelled by the Australian and New Zealand Army Corps.
- May 22
  - Quintinshill rail disaster in Scotland: The collision and fire kill 226, mostly troops, the largest number of fatalities in a rail accident in the United Kingdom.
  - Lassen Peak, one of the Cascade Volcanoes in California, erupts, sending an ash plume 30,000 feet in the air, and devastating the nearby area with pyroclastic flows and lahars. It is the only volcano to erupt in the contiguous United States this century, until the 1980 eruption of Mount St. Helens.
- May 23 – WWI: Italy joins the Allies after declaring war on Austria-Hungary.
- May 25 – China agrees to the Twenty-One Demands of the Japanese.
- May 27 – Armenian genocide: The Tehcir Law is promulgated by the Turkish Ottoman Empire authorizing deportation of the Ottoman Armenian population to Deir ez-Zor in the Syrian desert, leading to the deaths of anywhere between 800,000 and over 1,500,000 civilians and confiscation of their property.
- May 28 – International Congress of Women meets at the Hague as a major peace initiative.

=== June ===
- June – Armenian genocide: 15,000 civilians from the Ottoman Armenian population of Bitlis are massacred by Ottoman Turks and Kurds.
- June 3 – Mexican Revolution: Troops of Álvaro Obregón and Pancho Villa clash at León; Obregón loses his right arm in a grenade attack, but Villa is decisively defeated.
- June 11 – Friar Leonard Melki and hundreds of other Christians are driven out of Mardin and massacred by Ottoman troops.
- June 16 – Women's Institutes are established in Britain.
- June 19 – In Iceland, at this time a dependency of Denmark, women's suffrage is granted to those over 40.

=== July ===
- July
  - WWI: South West Africa Campaign – The Union of South Africa occupies German South West Africa with assistance from Canada, the United Kingdom, the Portuguese Republic and Portuguese Angola. South Africa will occupy South West Africa until March 1990.
  - Armenian genocide: 17,000 civilians from the Ottoman Armenian population of Trebizond are massacred by Ottoman Turks.
- July 1 – WWI: In aerial warfare, German fighter pilot Kurt Wintgens becomes the first person to shoot down another plane, using a machine gun equipped with synchronization gear.
- July 7
  - An overloaded International Railway (New York–Ontario) trolleycar with 157 passengers crashes near Queenston, Ontario, resulting in 15 deaths.
  - Sinhalese militia captain Henry Pedris is executed in British Ceylon for inciting race riots, a charge later proved false; he becomes a hero of the Sri Lankan independence movement.
- July 9 – WWI: Theodore Seitz, governor of German South West Africa, surrenders to General Louis Botha, between Otavi and Tsumeb.
- July 11 – WWI: Battle of Rufiji Delta – German cruiser SMS Königsberg (1905) is forced to scuttle in the Rufiji River, German East Africa (modern-day Tanzania).
- July 14 – The McMahon–Hussein Correspondence between Hussein bin Ali, Sharif of Mecca and the British official Sir Henry McMahon concerning the Arab revolt against the Ottoman Empire begins; in exchange for assistance against the Ottomans, the British offer bin Ali their recognition of an independent Arab kingdom, although clear terms are never agreed.
- July 22 – WWI: The "Great Retreat" is ordered on the Eastern Front; Russian forces pull back out of Poland (at this time part of the Russian Empire), taking machinery and equipment with them.
- July 24 – Steamer Eastland capsizes in central Chicago, with the loss of 844 lives.
- July 28 – The American occupation of Haiti (1915–34) begins.

=== August ===
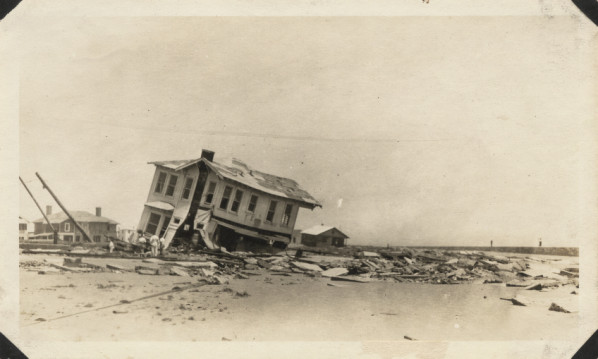
August: Destruction by the 1915 Galveston hurricane.

- August 5–23 – Hurricane Two of the 1915 Atlantic hurricane season over Galveston and New Orleans leaves 275 dead.
- August 6 – WWI: Battle of Sari Bair (Gallipoli Campaign) – The Allies mount a diversionary attack timed to coincide with a major Allied landing of reinforcements at Suvla Bay.
- August 16 – WWI: The Allies promise the Kingdom of Serbia, should victory be achieved over Austria-Hungary and its allied Central Powers, the territories of Baranja, Srem and Slavonia from the Cisleithanian part of the Dual Monarchy, Bosnia and Herzegovina, and eastern Dalmatia (from the river of Krka to Bar).

=== September ===
- September 5 – The Zimmerwald Conference begins in Switzerland.
- September 6 – The prototype military tank is first tested by the British Army.
- September 7 – Cartoonist John B. Gruelle is given a patent for his Raggedy Ann doll.
- September 8 – WWI: A Zeppelin raid destroys No. 61 Farringdon Road, London; the premises are rebuilt in 1917, and called The Zeppelin Building.
- September 11 – The Pennsylvania Railroad begins electrified commuter rail service between Paoli and Philadelphia, using overhead AC trolley wires for power. This type of system is later used in long-distance passenger trains between New York City, Washington, D.C., and Harrisburg, Pennsylvania.
- September 12 – French soldiers rescue over 4,000 Armenian genocide survivors stranded on Musa Dagh, a mountain in the Hatay province of Turkey.
- September 25–October 14 – WWI: Battle of Loos – British forces take the French town of Loos, but with substantial casualties, and are unable to press their advantage. This is the first time the British use poison gas in World War I, and also their first large-scale use of 'New' (or Kitchener's Army) units.
- September 30 – WWI: Serbian Army private Radoje Ljutovac becomes the first soldier in history to shoot down an enemy aircraft, with ground-to-air fire.

=== October ===
- October 12 – WWI: British nurse Edith Cavell is executed by a German firing squad, for helping Allied soldiers escape from Belgium.
- October 15 – WWI: Serbian Campaign – Austria-Hungary invades the Kingdom of Serbia. Bulgaria enters the war, also invading Serbia. The Serbian First Army retreats towards Greece.
- October 16 – WWI: France declares war on Bulgaria.
- October 19
  - WWI: Russia and Italy declare war on Bulgaria.
  - Mexican Revolution: The U.S. recognizes the Mexican government of Venustiano Carranza de facto (not de jure until 1917).
- October 23 – WWI: The torpedoing of armored cruiser SMS Prinz Adalbert (1901) results in only 3 men being rescued from a crew of 675, the greatest single loss of life for the Imperial German Navy in the Baltic Sea during the war.
- October 28 – St. Johns School fire: Fire at St. John's School in Peabody, Massachusetts, United States, claims the lives of 21 girls between the ages of 7 and 17.

=== November ===
- November 18 – The U.S. silent film Inspiration, the first mainstream movie in which a leading actress (Audrey Munson) appears nude, is released.
- November 21 – British polar exploration ship Endurance finally breaks apart from pressure of ice around it and sinks into the Weddell Sea, stranding Ernest Shackleton's Imperial Trans-Antarctic Expedition party in the Antarctic. The wreck is discovered at a depth of 3,008 metres (9,869 ft), 107 years later in 2022.
- November 24 – William J. Simmons revives the American Civil War era Ku Klux Klan at Stone Mountain, Georgia.
- November 25 – Albert Einstein presents part of his theory of general relativity to the Prussian Academy of Sciences.

=== December ===
- December 4–18 – The 'Peace Ship' Oscar II chartered by industrialist Henry Ford sails from Hoboken, New Jersey to Oslo on an independent and eventually unsuccessful mission to broker a peace conference.
- December 8 – Jean Sibelius conducts the world première of his Symphony No. 5 in Helsinki at a 50th birthday concert for him.
- December 12 – President of the Republic of China Yuan Shikai declares himself Emperor.
- December 23 – HMHS Britannic, which will be the largest British ship lost in WWI (though with only 30 fatalities), departs Liverpool on her maiden voyage as a hospital ship.
- December 26 – The Irish Republican Brotherhood Military Council decides to stage an Easter Rising in 1916.

== Births ==
=== January ===
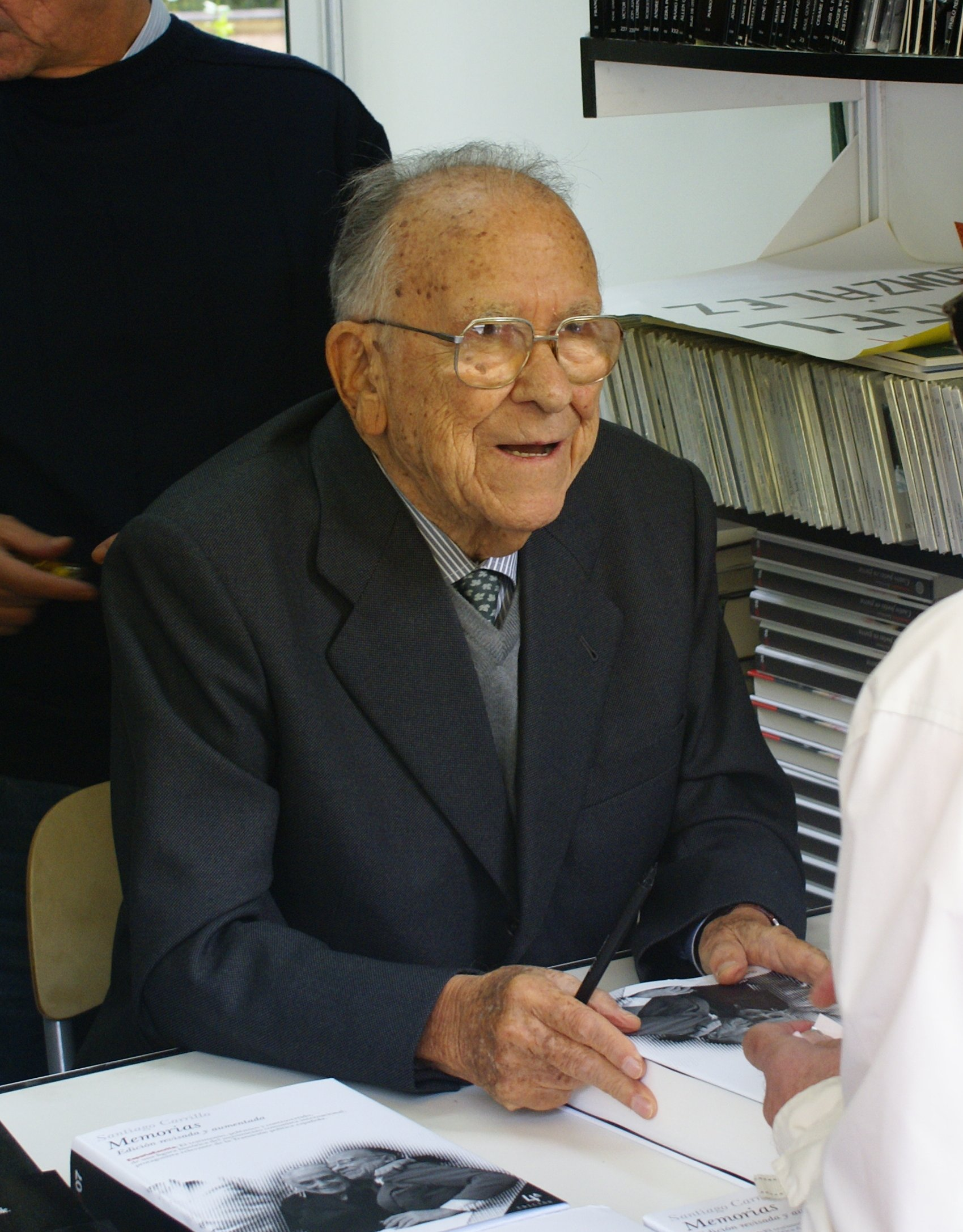
Santiago Carrillo

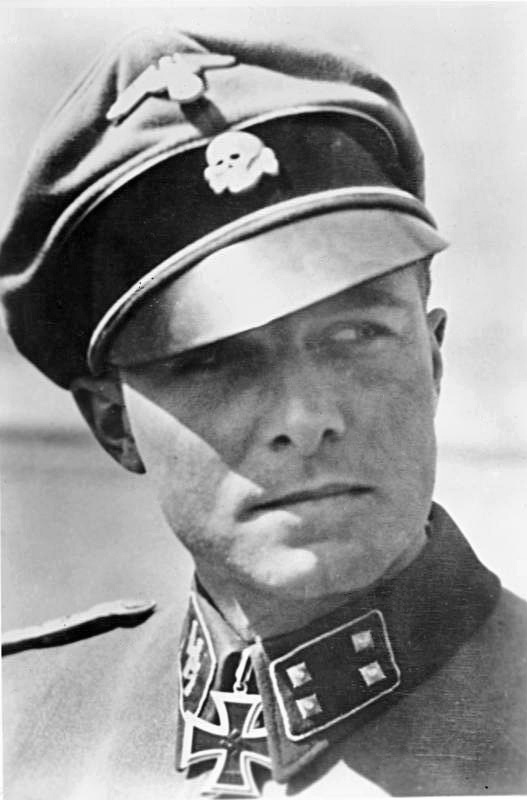
Joachim Peiper

- January 1 – Branko Ćopić, Yugoslav writer (d. 1984)
- January 4 – Adolf Opálka, Czechoslovak soldier (d. 1942)
- January 6 – Alan Watts, British philosopher (d. 1973)
- January 9 – Fernando Lamas, Argentine-born American actor (d. 1982)
- January 11 – Paddy Mayne, British soldier, co-founder of the Special Air Service (d. 1955)
- January 16 – Susan Ahn Cuddy, United States Navy gunnery officer (d. 2015)
- January 17 – Sammy Angott, American boxer (d. 1980)
- January 18 – Santiago Carrillo, Spanish politician (d. 2012)
- January 20 – Ghulam Ishaq Khan, Pakistani civil servant, 7th president of Pakistan (d. 2006)
- January 23
  - W. Arthur Lewis, Saint Lucian economist, Nobel Prize laureate (d. 1991)
  - Potter Stewart, Associate Justice of the Supreme Court of the United States (d. 1985)
- January 24 – Robert Motherwell, American painter (d. 1991)
- January 25 – Ewan MacColl, English folk singer, songwriter, and poet (d. 1989)
- January 29 – V. V. Sadagopan, Indian film actor, music teacher, performer and composer (d. unknown)
- January 30
  - Joachim Peiper, German Waffen-SS officer and convicted war criminal (d. 1976)
  - John Profumo, British politician (d. 2006)
- January 31 – Thomas Merton, American monk, author (d. 1968)

=== February ===
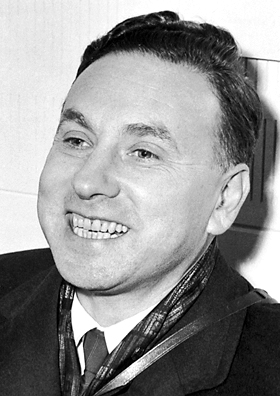
Robert Hofstadter

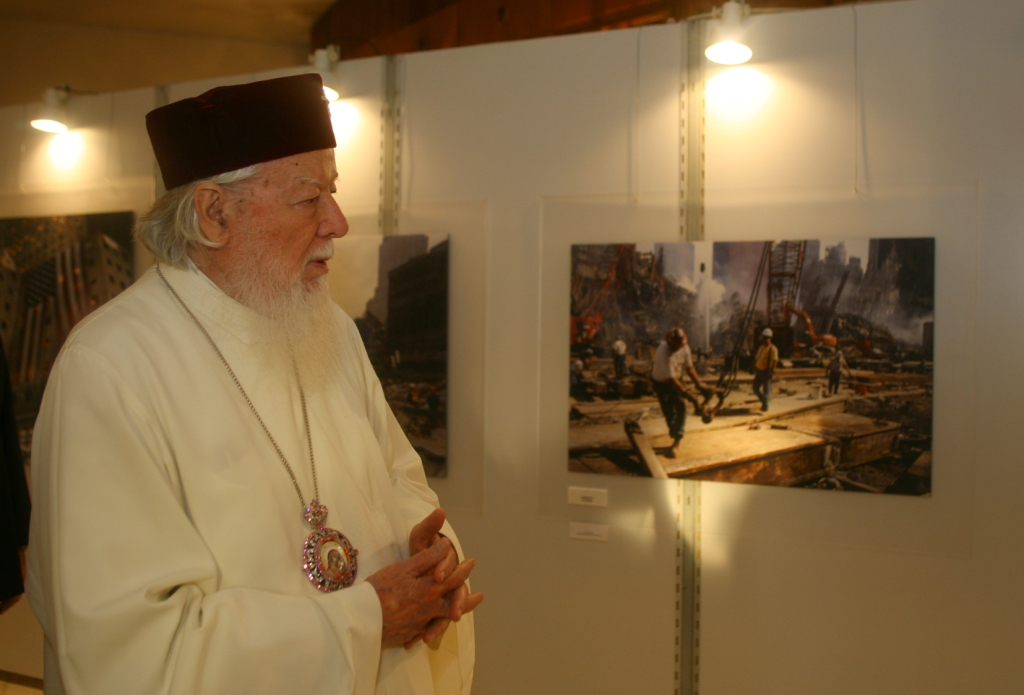
Teoctist Arăpașu

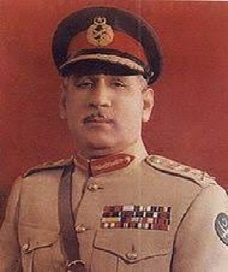
Tikka Khan

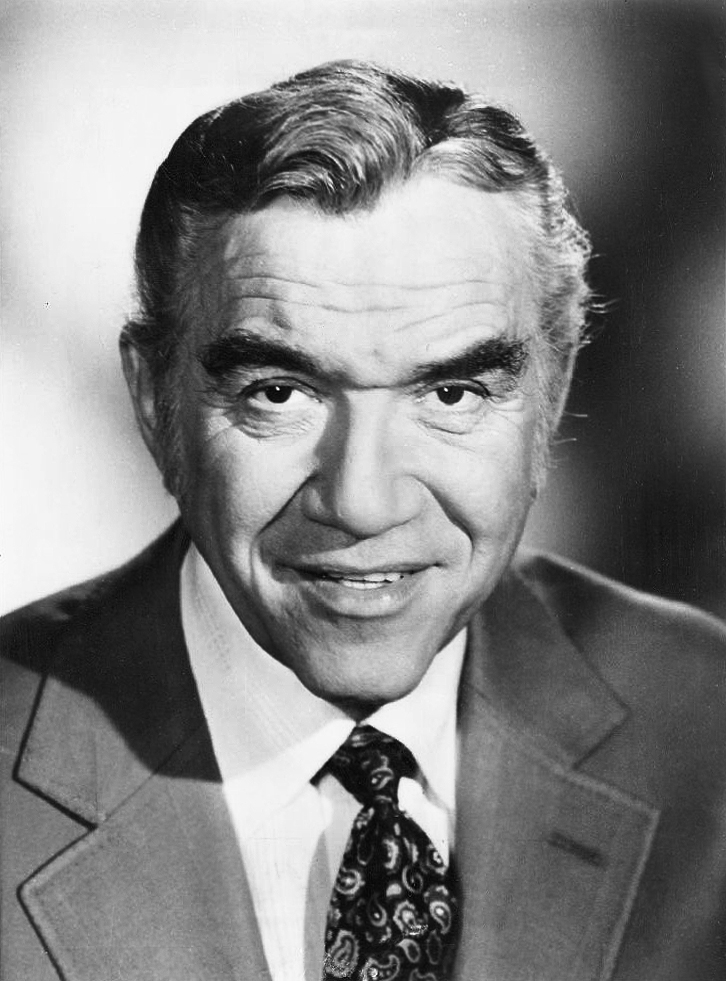
Lorne Greene

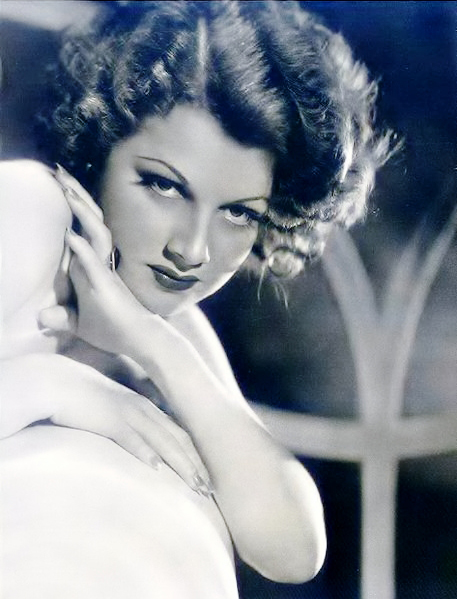
Ann Sheridan

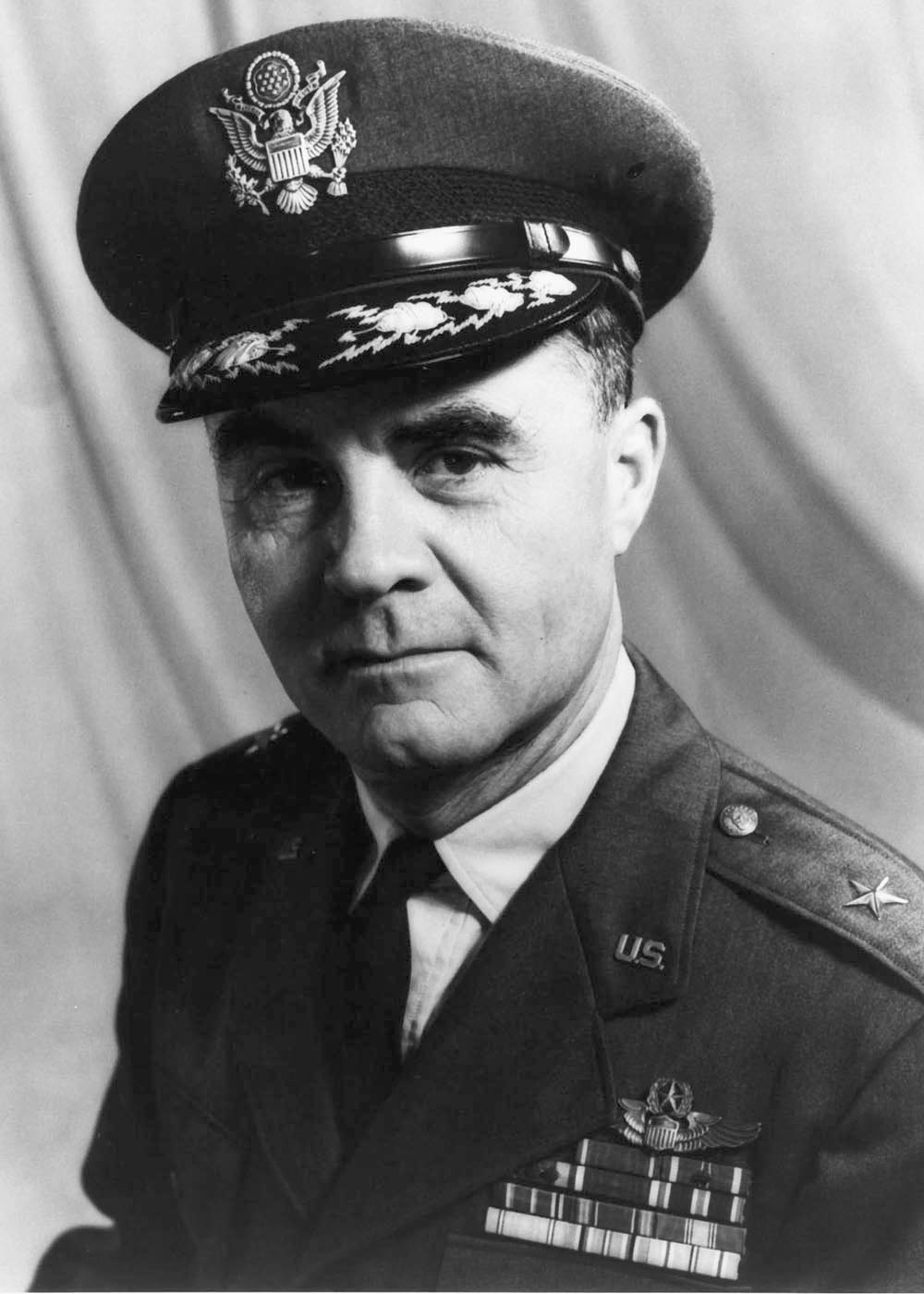
Paul Tibbets

- February 1 – Sir Stanley Matthews, English footballer (d. 2000)
- February 2
  - Abba Eban, South African-born Israeli foreign affairs minister (d. 2002)
  - Khushwant Singh, Indian writer (d. 2014)
- February 4
  - Ray Evans, American composer (d. 2007)
  - Sir Norman Wisdom, English comedian, singer, and actor (d. 2010)
- February 5 – Robert Hofstadter, American physicist, Nobel Prize laureate (d. 1990)
- February 7
  - Teoctist Arăpașu, Romanian Orthodox Church patriarch (d. 2007)
  - Georges-André Chevallaz, 78th president of the Swiss Confederation (d. 2002)
- February 10 – Tikka Khan, Pakistani army general (d. 2002)
- February 11 – Patrick Leigh Fermor, British author and soldier (d. 2011)
- February 12
  - Richard G. Colbert, American admiral (d. 1973)
  - Lorne Greene, Canadian actor (d. 1987)
  - Olivia Hooker, American civil rights figure (d. 2018)
- February 13 – Aung San, Burmese national leader (d. 1947)
- February 19 – John Freeman, British politician, diplomat and broadcaster (d. 2014)
- February 21
  - Ann Sheridan, American film actress (d. 1967)
  - Anton Vratuša, 8th prime minister of Slovenia (d. 2017)
- February 23
  - Jon Hall, American actor (d. 1979)
  - Paul Tibbets, American World War II bomber pilot (Enola Gay) (d. 2007)
- February 25 – S. Rajaratnam, 1st Senior Minister of Singapore (d. 2006)
- February 28
  - Peter Medawar, Brazilian-born scientist, recipient of the Nobel Prize in Physiology or Medicine (d. 1987)
  - Zero Mostel, American film, stage actor (d. 1977)

=== March ===
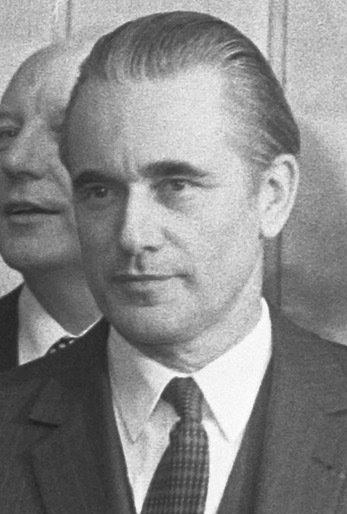
Jacques Chaban-Delmas

- March 4
  - László Csatáry, Hungarian convicted Nazi war criminal (d. 2013)
  - Carlos Surinach, Spanish-born American composer (d. 1997)
- March 6
  - Mary Ward, Australian actress (d. 2021)
  - Syedna Mohammed Burhanuddin, Indian leader of the Dawoodi Bohra Community (d. 2014)
- March 7 – Jacques Chaban-Delmas, French politician, Prime Minister of France (d. 2000)
- March 8 – Drue Heinz, British-born American literary publisher (d. 2018)
- March 9 – Johnnie Johnson, English WWII pilot (d. 2001)
- March 11 – Vijay Hazare, Indian cricketer (d. 2004)
- March 17 – Bill Roycroft, Australian equestrian (d. 2011)
- March 19 – Patricia Morison, American actress (d. 2018)
- March 20
  - Rudolf Kirchschläger, Austrian politician, 8th president of Austria (d. 2000)
  - Sviatoslav Richter, Ukrainian pianist (d. 1997)
  - Sister Rosetta Tharpe, American singer (d. 1973)
- March 23
  - Tom Pashby, Canadian ophthalmologist and sport safety advocate (d. 2005)
  - Vasily Zaytsev, Soviet sniper (d. 1991)
- March 30
  - Arsenio Erico, Paraguayan footballer (d. 1977)
  - Pietro Ingrao, Italian politician (d. 2015)
- March 31 – Albert Hourani, English historian (d. 1993)

=== April ===
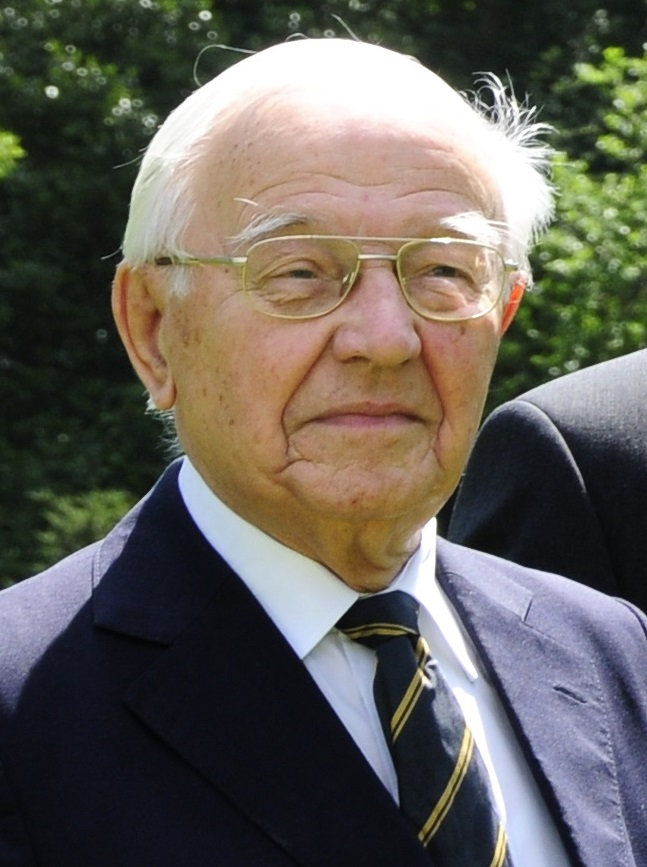
Piet de Jong

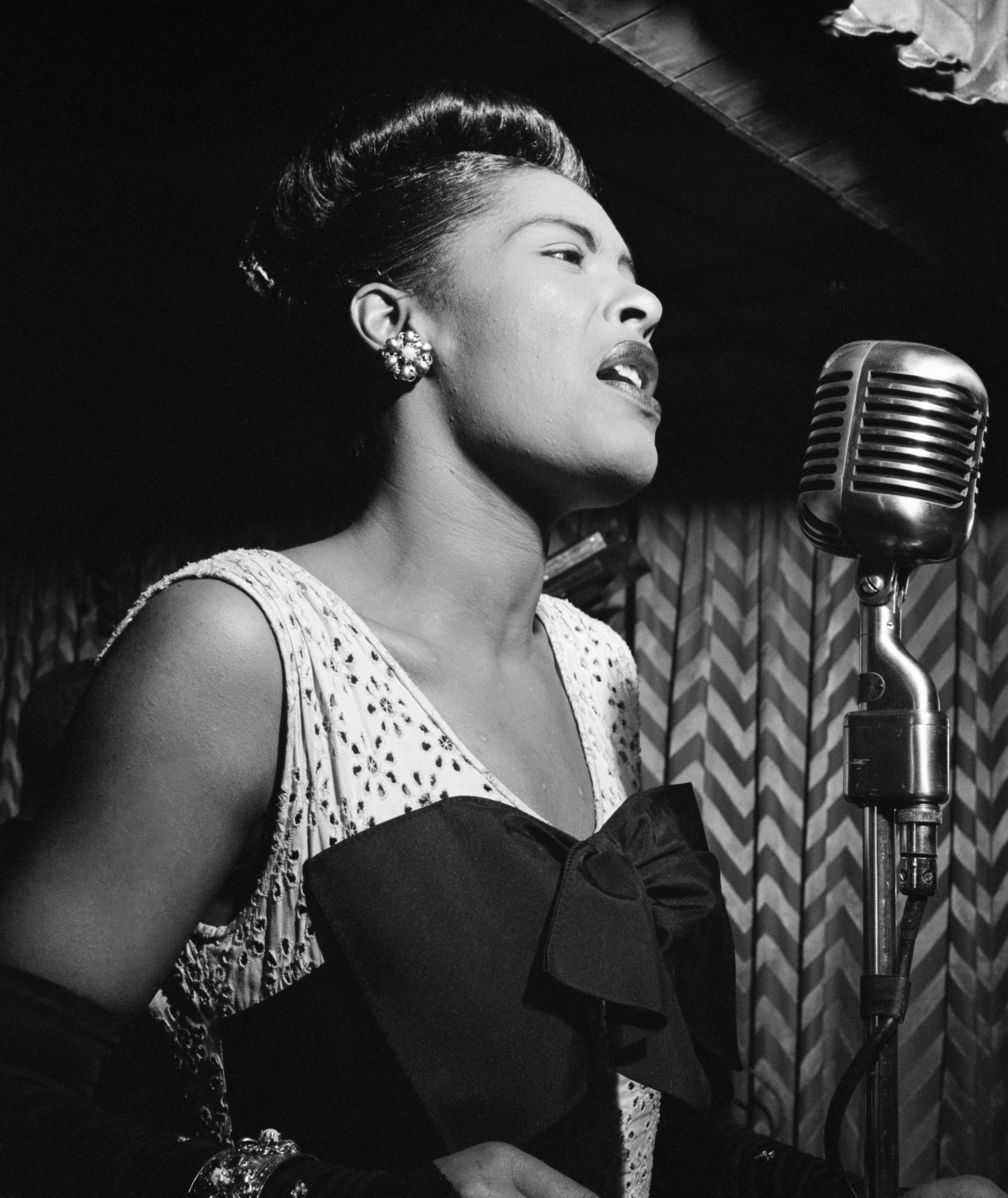
Billie Holiday

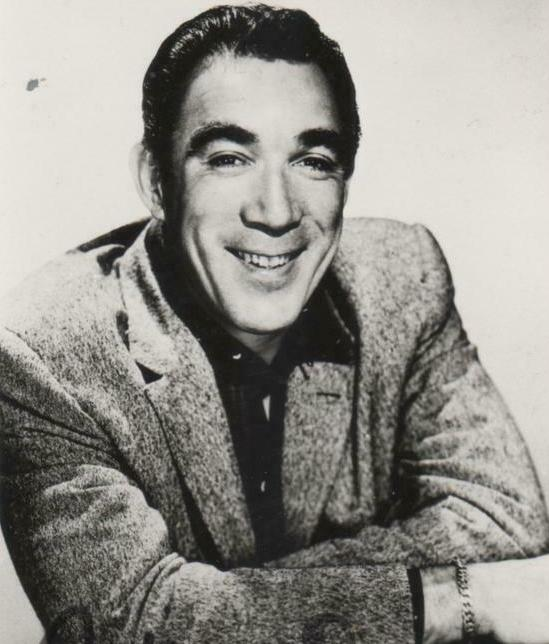
Anthony Quinn

- April 1 – O. W. Fischer, Austrian actor (d. 2004)
- April 3
  - Piet de Jong, Dutch politician, naval officer, Minister of Defence and Prime Minister of the Netherlands (d. 2016)
  - Paul Touvier, French Nazi collaborator (d. 1996)
- April 6 – Tadeusz Kantor, Polish painter and theatre director (d. 1990)
- April 7
  - Stanley Adams, American actor and screenwriter (d. 1977)
  - Albert O. Hirschman, German-born American economist (d. 2012)
  - Billie Holiday, African-American singer (d. 1959)
- April 8 – Ivan Supek, Croatian physicist, author, and human rights activist (d. 2007)
- April 10
  - Sardar Ibrahim Khan, Kashmiri guerrilla leader (d. 2003)
  - Harry Morgan, American actor and director (d. 2011)
- April 21 – Anthony Quinn, Mexican-born American actor (d. 2001)
- April 29 – Donald Mills, American lead tenor of the Mills Brothers (d. 1999)
- April 30 – Elio Toaff, Italian rabbi (d. 2015)

=== May ===
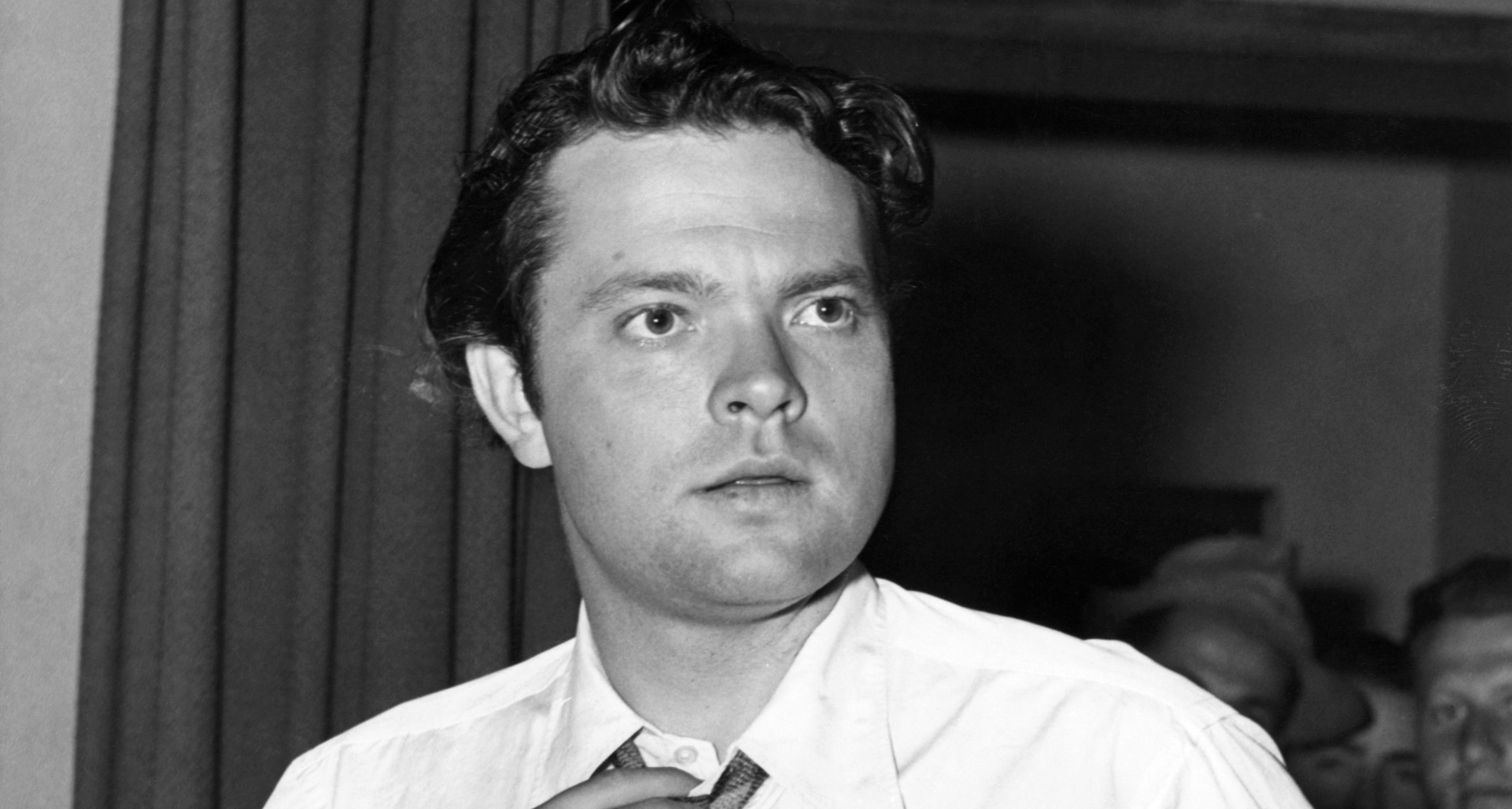
Orson Welles

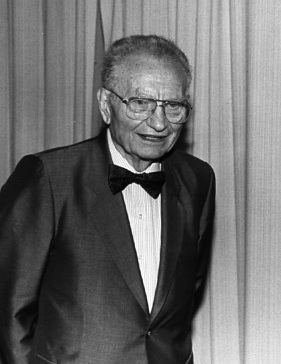
Paul Samuelson

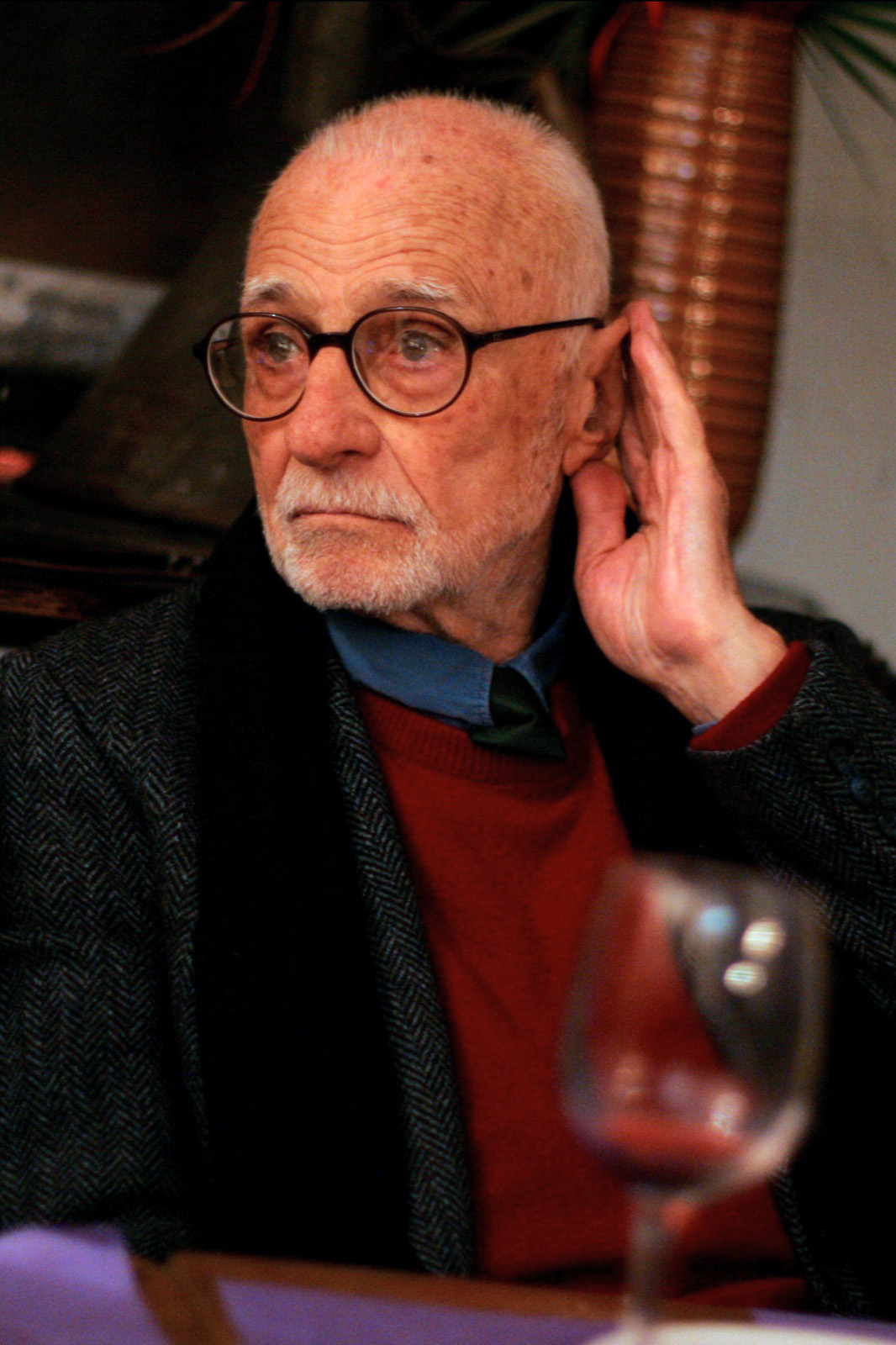
Mario Monicelli

- May 3 – Stu Hart, Canadian wrestling trainer (d. 2003)
- May 5 – Alice Faye, American entertainer (d. 1998)
- May 6 – Orson Welles, American actor and director (d. 1985)
- May 10
  - Beyers Naudé, South African cleric, theologian and activist (d. 2004)
  - Sir Denis Thatcher, British businessman, husband of Margaret Thatcher (d. 2003)
- May 12 – Brother Roger, Swiss founder of the Taizé Community (d. 2005)
- May 15 – Paul Samuelson, American economist, Nobel Prize laureate (d. 2009)
- May 16 – Mario Monicelli, Italian film director (d. 2010)
- May 19 – Renée Asherson, British actress (d. 2014)
- May 20 – Moshe Dayan, Israeli military leader and politician (d. 1981)
- May 27 – Herman Wouk, American author (d. 2019)
- May 31 – Carmen Herrera, Cuban-born American painter (d. 2022)

=== June ===
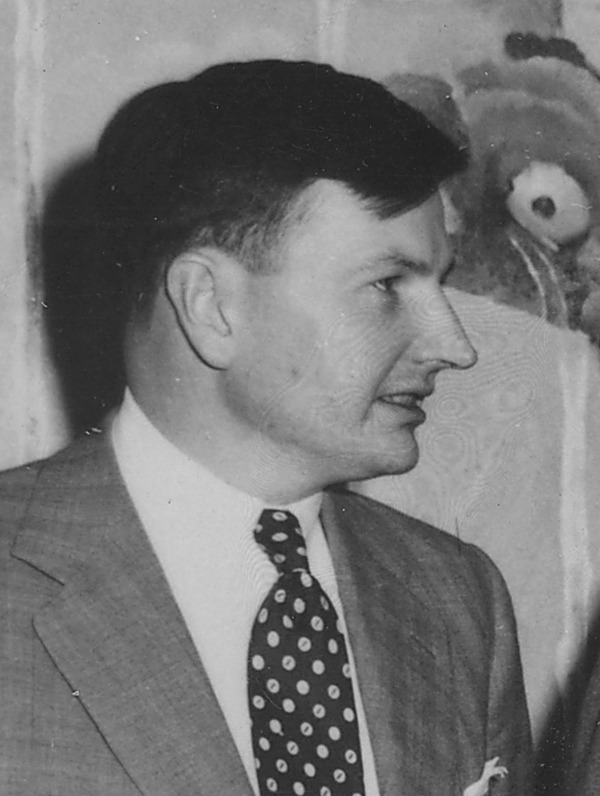
David Rockefeller

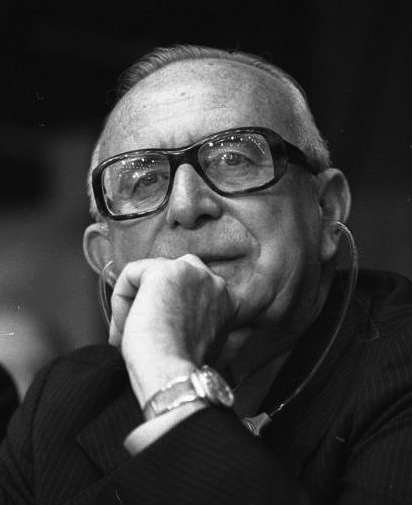
Mariano Rumor

- June 2 – Tapio Wirkkala, Finnish designer (d. 1985)
- June 3 – Milton Cato, Prime Minister of Saint Vincent and the Grenadines (d. 1997)
- June 4 – Modibo Keïta, 1st president of Mali (d. 1977)
- June 9 – Les Paul, American inventor and musician (d. 2009)
- June 10
  - Saul Bellow, Canadian-born American writer, Nobel Prize laureate (d. 2005)
  - Inia Te Wiata, New Zealand Māori bass-baritone opera singer, film actor, whakairo (carver) and artist (d. 1971)
- June 11 – Buddy Baer, American boxer and actor (d. 1986)
- June 12 – David Rockefeller, American banker and philanthropist (d. 2017)
- June 14 – Loke Wan Tho, Singaporean business magnate, ornithologist, and photographer (d. 1964)
- June 15
  - Kaiser Matanzima, President of the Transkei bantustan (d. 2003)
  - Nini Theilade, Danish ballet dancer, choreographer and teacher (d. 2018)
  - Thomas Huckle Weller, American virologist, recipient of the Nobel Prize in Physiology or Medicine (d. 2008)
- June 16 – Mariano Rumor, Italian politician, prime minister (1968-1970, 1973-1974) (d. 1990)
- June 17 – Mario Echandi Jiménez, President of Costa Rica (d. 2011)
- June 22 – Cornelius Warmerdam, American track & field athlete (d. 2001)
- June 24 – Fred Hoyle, British astronomer (d. 2001)
- June 26 – George Haigh, English professional footballer and centenarian (d. 2019)
- June 27 – Grace Lee Boggs, American author, social activist and philosopher (d. 2015)
- June 30 – Oskar-Hubert Dennhardt, German Wehrmacht officer (d. 2014)

=== July ===
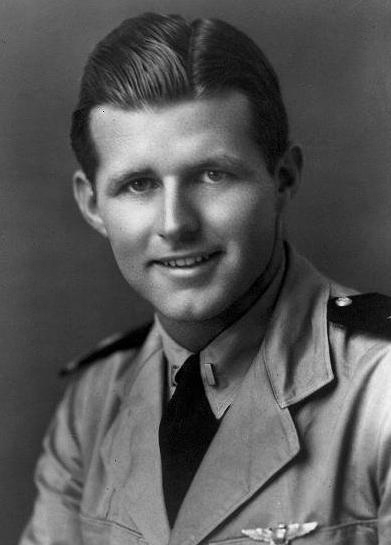
Joseph P. Kennedy Jr.

- July 1
  - A. F. M. Ahsanuddin Chowdhury, 9th president of Bangladesh (d. 2001)
  - Willie Dixon, American blues musician (d. 1992)
  - Nguyễn Văn Linh, Vietnamese revolutionary and politician, liver cancer (d. 1998)
- July 5
  - Yu Guangyuan, Chinese economist (d. 2013)
  - John Woodruff, American athlete (d. 2007)
- July 6 – Javaregowda, Indian language author (d. 2016)
- July 8 – Lowell E. English, United States Marine Corps general (d. 2005)
- July 12 – Princess Catherine Ivanovna of Russia (d. 2007)
- July 13 – Tex Hill, Korean-American fighter pilot and flying ace (d. 2007)
- July 14 – Harold Pupkewitz, Namibian entrepreneur (d. 2012)
- July 15
  - Alicia Zubasnabar de De la Cuadra, Argentine human rights activist (d. 2008)
  - Kashmir Singh Katoch, Indian general (d. 2007)
- July 19 – Katherine Sanford, American biologist (d. 2005)
- July 24 – Enrique Fernando, Chief Justice of the Philippine Supreme Court (d. 2004)
- July 25 – Joseph P. Kennedy Jr., American fighter pilot, elder brother of John F. Kennedy (d. 1944)
- July 26 – K. Pattabhi Jois, Indian yogi (d. 2009)
- July 28
  - Charles H. Townes, American physicist, Nobel Prize laureate (d. 2015)
  - Frankie Yankovic, American accordion player (d. 1998)
- July 30
  - Viliam Žingor, Slovak general and anti-fascist fighter (d. 1950)

=== August ===
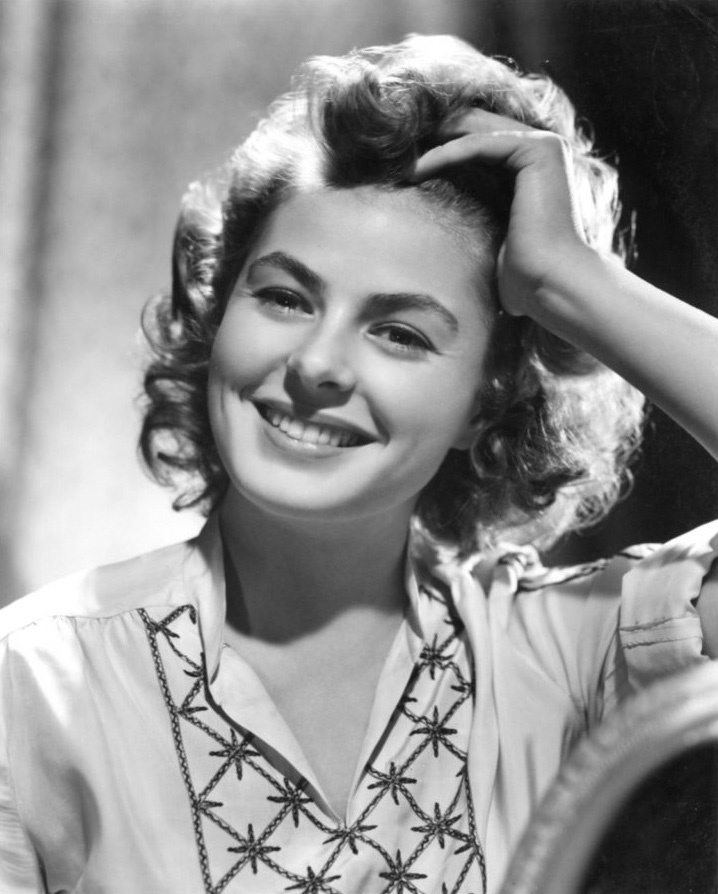
Ingrid Bergman

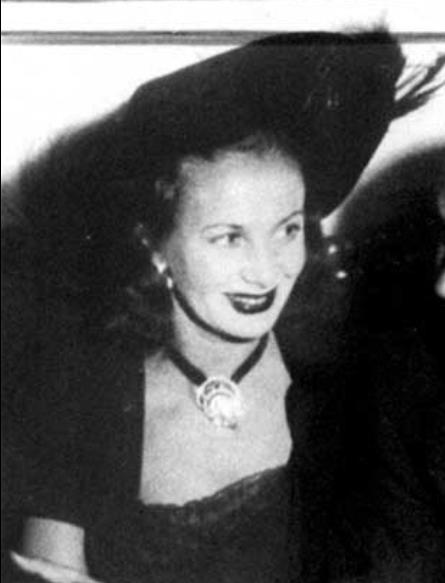
Princess Lilian

- August 2 – Neville Wigram, 2nd Baron Wigram, British army officer and member of the House of Lords (d. 2017)
- August 3 – Pete Newell, Canadian-born American basketball coach (d. 2008)
- August 8 – María Rostworowski, Peruvian historian (d. 2016)
- August 9 – Louis Collard, Belgian fascist politician and Nazi collaborator (d. 1947)
- August 12 – Michael Kidd, American choreographer (d. 2007)
- August 18 – Joseph Arthur Ankrah, 2nd president of Ghana (d. 1992)
- August 19 – Ring Lardner Jr., American film screenwriter (d. 2000)
- August 20 – Ivo Rojnica, Croatian-Argentine war crimes suspect, businessman, diplomat, and intelligence agent (d. 2007)
- August 21 – Arnold Goodman, Baron Goodman, British lawyer, political adviser (d. 1995)
- August 24 – Wynonie Harris, African-American blues, rhythm and blues singer (d. 1969)
- August 27 – Norman Ramsey Jr., American physicist, Nobel Prize laureate (d. 2011)
- August 29 – Ingrid Bergman, Swedish actress (d. 1982)
- August 30 – Princess Lilian, Duchess of Halland, British-born Swedish princess (d. 2013)

=== September ===
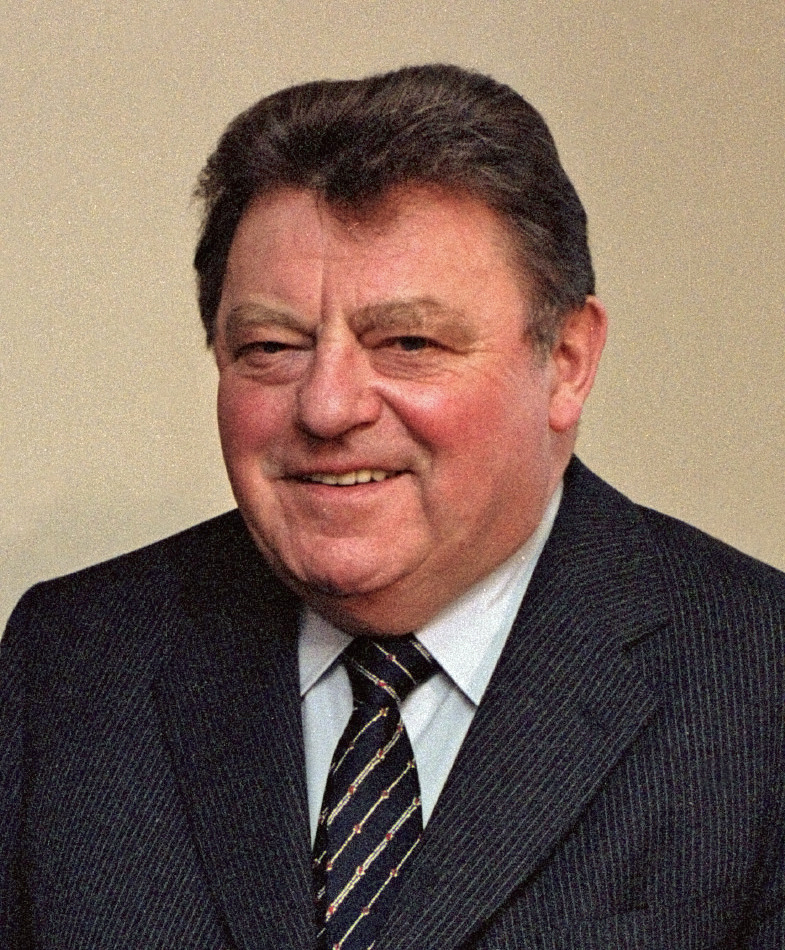
Franz Josef Strauss

- September 3 – Knut Nystedt, Norwegian composer (d. 2014)
- September 6 – Franz Josef Strauss, German politician (d. 1988)
- September 10 – Edmond O'Brien, American actor (d. 1985)
- September 11 – Raúl Lastiri, 39th president of Argentina (d. 1978)
- September 14 – John Dobson, American astronomer (d. 2014)
- September 15 – Helmut Schön, German football player, manager (d. 1996)
- September 17 – M. F. Husain, Indian artist (d. 2011)
- September 19 – Germán Valdés, Mexican actor, singer and comedian (d. 1973)
- September 20 – Malik Meraj Khalid, prime minister of Pakistan (d. 2003)
- September 23
  - Zdenko Blažeković, Croatian politician (d. 1947)
  - Clifford Shull, American physicist, Nobel Prize laureate (d. 2001)
- September 28 – Kay Mander, British film director, shooting continuity specialist (d. 2013)
- September 30 – Lester Maddox, American politician, governor of Georgia (d. 2003)

=== October ===
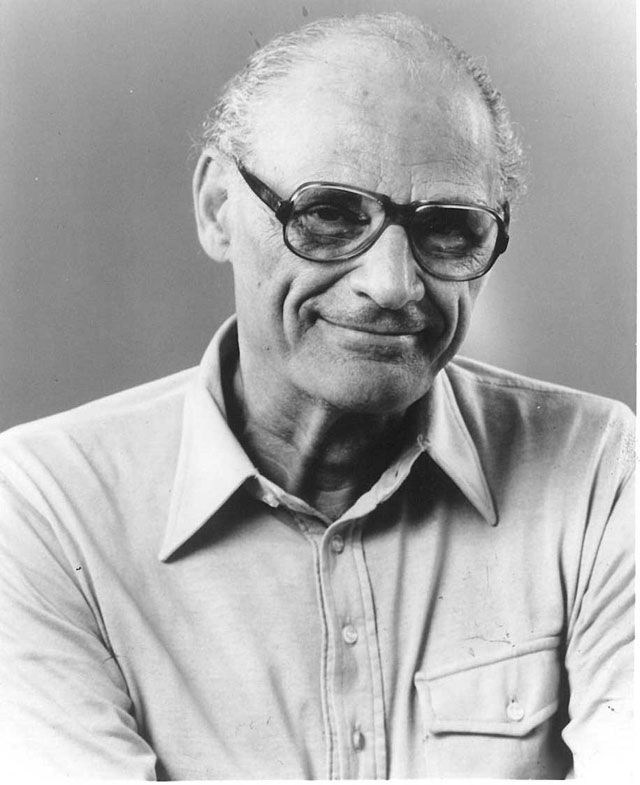
Arthur Miller

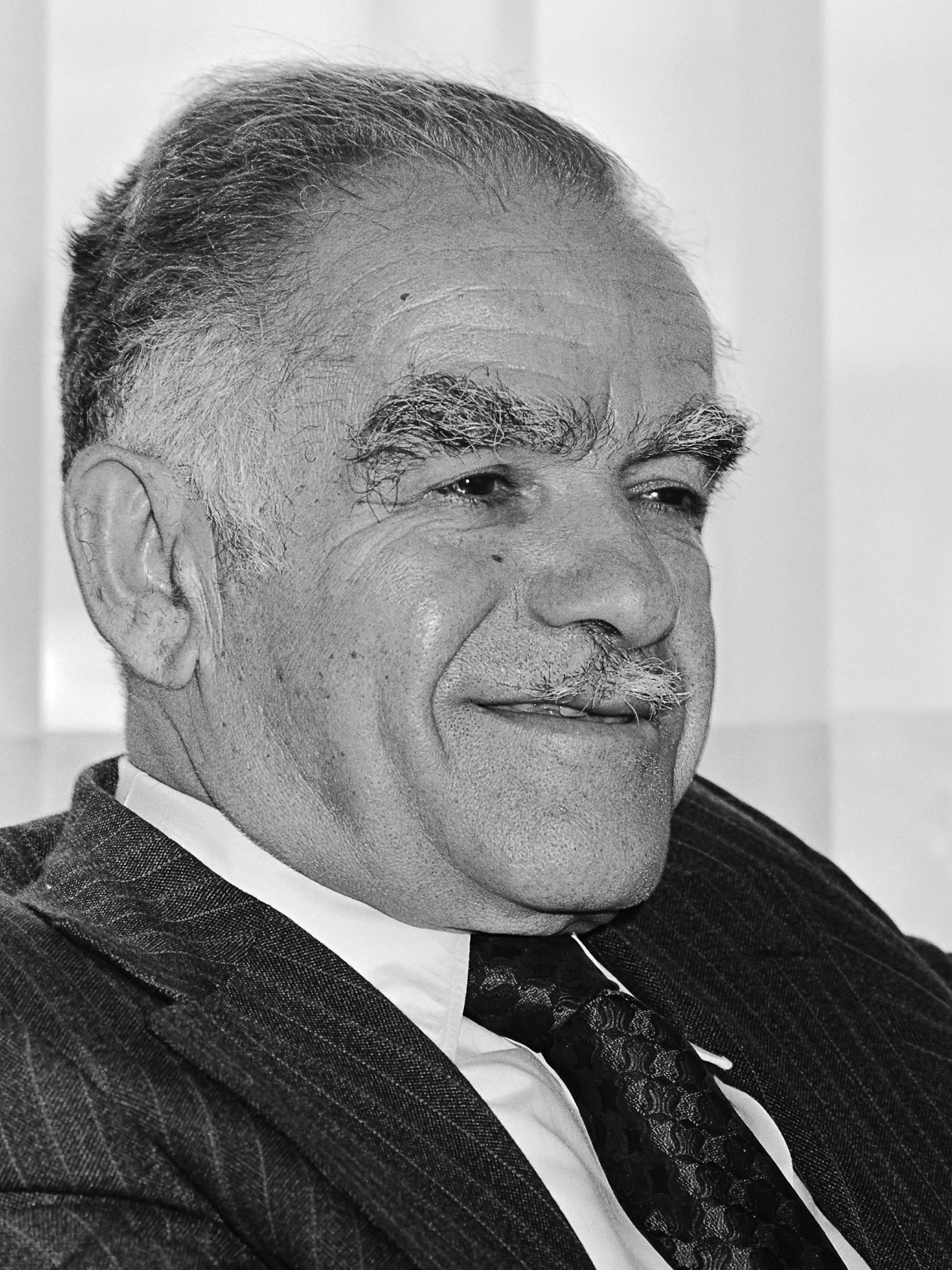
Yitzhak Shamir

- October 1 – Jerome Bruner, American psychologist (d. 2016)
- October 6 – Neus Català, Spanish political activist (d. 2019)
- October 11 – T. Llew Jones, Welsh author, poet (d. 2009)
- October 14 – Loris Francesco Capovilla, Italian Roman Catholic prelate (d. 2016)
- October 17 – Arthur Miller, American playwright (d. 2005)
- October 18 – Thomas Round, English opera singer, actor (d. 2016)
- October 22 – Yitzhak Shamir, Israeli politician, prime minister (d. 2012)
- October 23 – Shin Hyun-joon, South Korean general (d. 2007)
- October 24 – Bob Kane, American comic book artist/writer, co-creator of Batman (d. 1998)
- October 27 – Harry Saltzman, Canadian theatre, film producer (d. 1994)

=== November ===
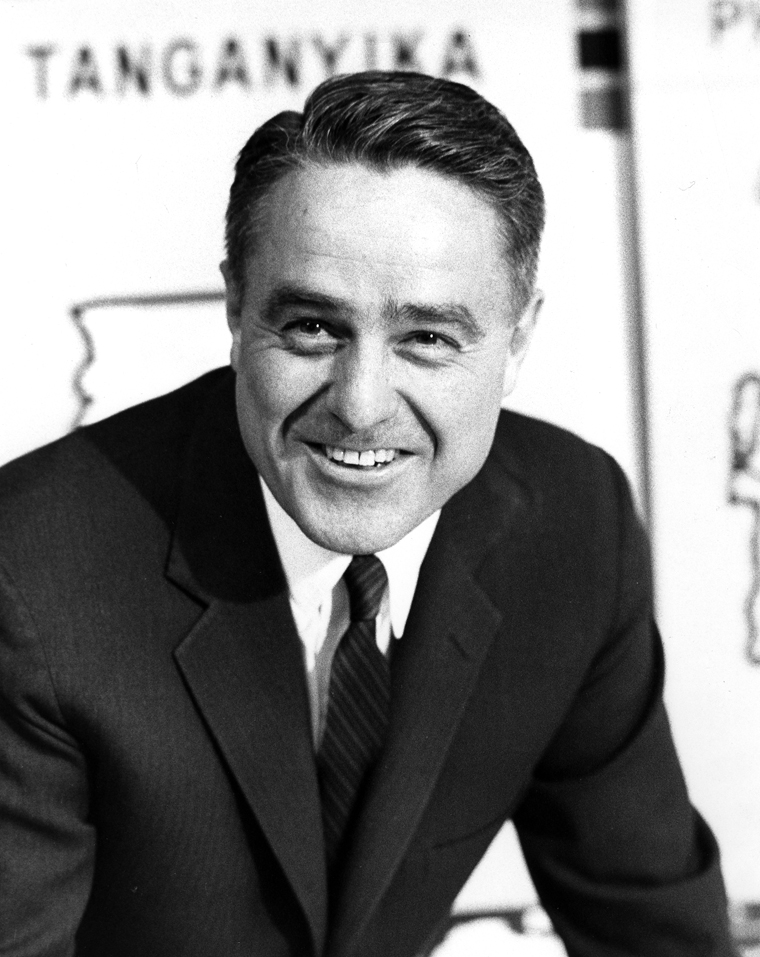
Sargent Shriver

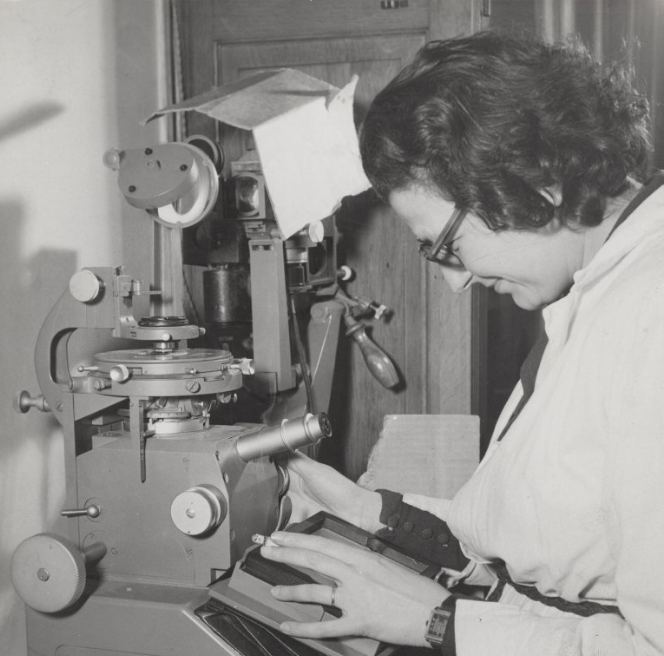
Henriette Mathieu-Faraggi

- November 1 – Marion Eugene Carl, U.S. Marine Corps World War II fighter ace, test pilot (d. 1998)
- November 4
  - Wee Kim Wee, 4th president of Singapore (d. 2005)
  - Ismail Abdul Rahman, Malaysian politician (d. 1973)
- November 7 – Philip Morrison, American physicist, astrophysicist and professor (d. 2005)
- November 8 – Richard Luyt, South African-born 1st governor general of Guyana (d. 1994)
- November 9 – Sargent Shriver, American politician (d. 2011)
- November 11
  - William Proxmire, United States senator (d. 2005)
  - Anna Schwartz, American economist (d. 2012)
- November 12 – Roland Barthes, French philosopher, literary critic (d. 1980)
- November 19 – Earl Wilbur Sutherland Jr., American physiologist, Nobel Prize laureate (d. 1974)
- November 23
  - John Dehner, American actor (d. 1992)
  - Julio César Méndez Montenegro, President of Guatemala (d. 1996)
- November 25
  - Augusto Pinochet, 31st president of Chile (d. 2006)
  - Armando Villanueva, prime minister of Peru (d. 2013)
- November 26 – Henriette Mathieu-Faraggi, French nuclear physicist (d. 1985)
- November 29 – Billy Strayhorn, American jazz pianist-composer (d. 1967)
- November 30
  - Emmanuel Pelaez, 6th vice president of the Philippines (d. 2003)
  - Henry Taube, Canadian-born chemist, Nobel Prize laureate (d. 2005)

=== December ===
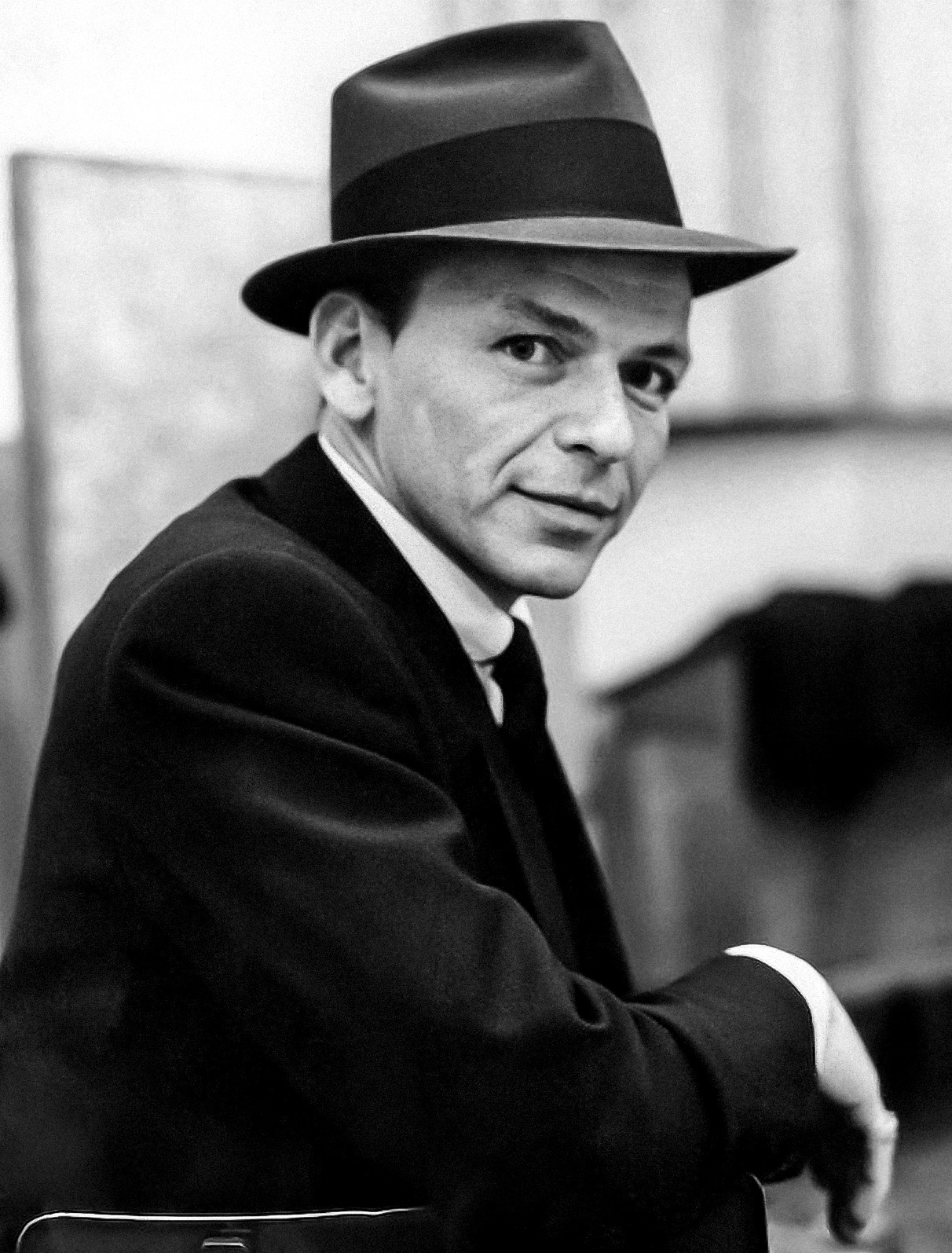
Frank Sinatra

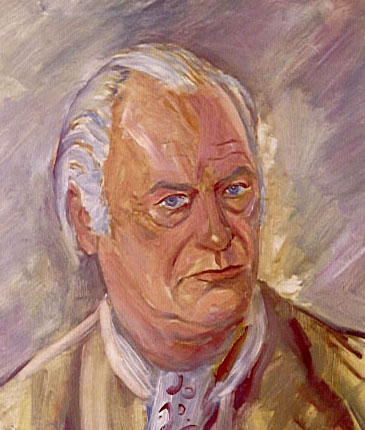
Curd Juergens

- December 2
  - Takahito, Prince Mikasa, younger brother of Japanese Emperor Hirohito (d. 2016)
  - Marais Viljoen, president of South Africa (d. 2007)
- December 7 – Eli Wallach, American actor (d. 2014)
- December 8 – Ernest Lehman, American screenwriter (d. 2005)
- December 9 – Elisabeth Schwarzkopf, German-born British soprano (d. 2006)
- December 12 – Frank Sinatra, American singer, actor (d. 1998)
- December 13
  - Curd Juergens, German-born Austrian film actor (d. 1982)
  - John Vorster, prime minister and state president of South Africa (d. 1983)
- December 14 – Dan Dailey, American actor, dancer (d. 1978)
- December 15 – Kenshiro Abbe, Japanese master of judo, aikido, and kendo (d. 1985)
- December 17 – Robert Dahl, American political scientist (d. 2014)
- December 19 – Édith Piaf, French singer (d. 1963)
- December 22 – Barbara Billingsley, American actress (d. 2010)
- December 27 – Gyula Zsengellér, Hungarian footballer (d. 1999)

== Deaths ==
=== January ===
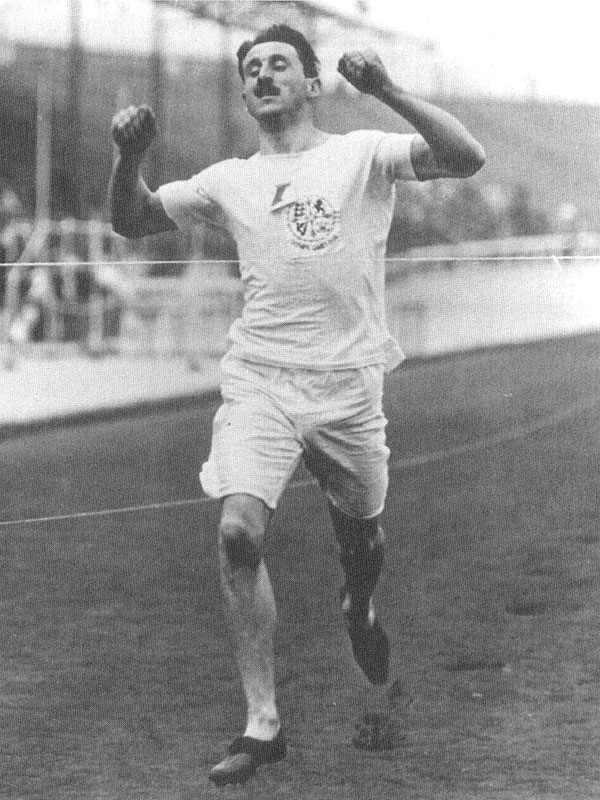
Wyndham Halswelle

- January 9 – Yang Shoujing, Chinese historical geographer and calligrapher (b. 1839)
- January 10 – Marshall Pinckney Wilder, American actor, humorist, comedian and monologist (b. 1859)
- January 13 – Mary Slessor, Scottish Christian missionary (b. 1848)
- January 14 – Richard Meux Benson, English founder of an Anglican religious order (b. 1824)
- January 18 – Anatoly Stessel, Russian baron and general (b. 1848)
- January 19 – Anna Leonowens (Anna of The King and I) (b. 1831)
- January 22 – James M. Spangler, American inventor (b. 1848)

=== February ===
- February 3 – Bosnian Serb conspirators (executed for their part in the assassination of Archduke Franz Ferdinand of Austria):
  - Veljko Čubrilović (b. 1886)
  - Danilo Ilić (b. 1891)
  - Miško Jovanović (b. 1878)
- February 5 – Ross Barnes, American baseball player (b. 1850)
- February 18
  - Francisco Giner de los Ríos, Spanish philosopher, educator (b. 1839)
  - Frank James, American outlaw (b. 1843)
- February 22 – Sir John Gough, British general, Victoria Cross recipient (killed in action) (b. 1871)
- February 26 –Edward Richardson, New Zealand engineer and politician (b. 1831)

=== March ===
- March 4 – William Willett, English promoter of daylight saving time (b. 1856)
- March 13 – Sergei Witte, Russian aristocrat, statesman and Prime Minister (b. 1849)
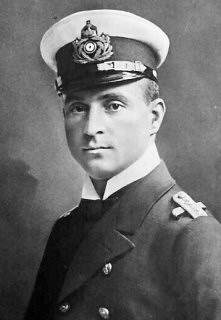
- Otto Weddigen
  March 14 – Lincoln J. Beachey, American pilot (b. 1887)
- March 15 – George Llewelyn Davies, English soldier, inspiration for the "Lost Boys" of Peter Pan (killed in action) (b. 1893)
- March 18 - Otto Weddigen, German U-boat commander during World War I (killed in action) (b.1882)
- March 21 – Frederick Winslow Taylor, American engineer, economist (b. 1856)
- March 24 − Morgan Robertson, American author (b. 1861)
- March 31
  - Wyndham Halswelle, Scottish runner (killed in action) (b. 1882)
  - Nathan Rothschild, 1st Baron Rothschild, British banker and politician (b. 1840)

=== April ===
- April 4 – Andrew Stoddart, English sportsman (b. 1863)
- April 9 – Friedrich Loeffler, German bacteriologist (b. 1852)
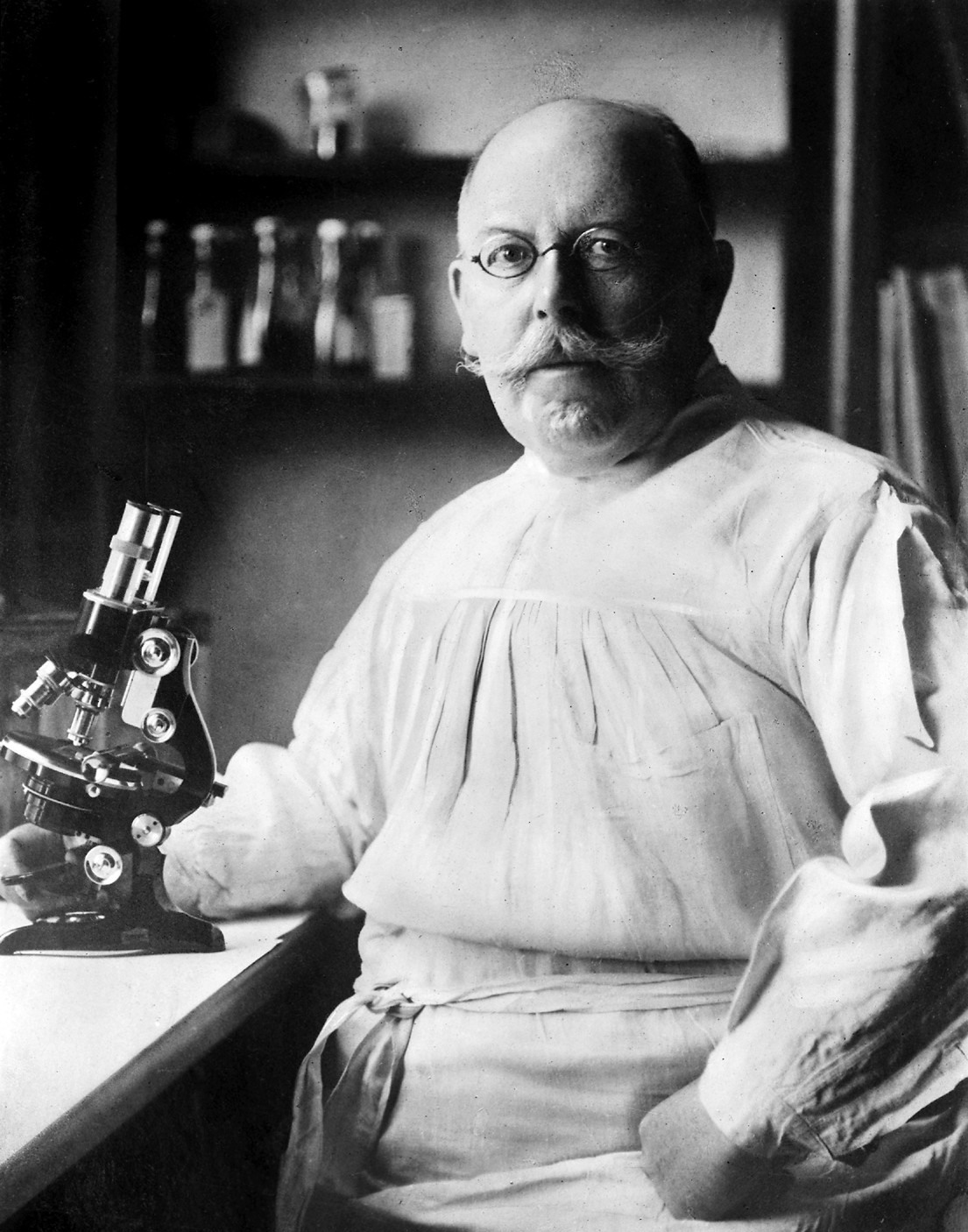
  Friedrich Loeffler
- April 11 – Maria Swanenburg, Dutch serial killer (b. 1839)
- April 26 – Ida Hunt Udall, American Latter-day Saint diarist (b. 1858)
- April 16 – Nelson W. Aldrich, U.S. senator from Rhode Island (b. 1841)
- April 20 – Daniel Webster Jones, American Latter-day Saint pioneer (b. 1830)
- April 23
  - Rupert Brooke, English poet (sepsis from an infected mosquito bite on active service) (b. 1887)
  - Frederick Fisher, Canadian recipient of Victoria Cross (killed in action) (b. 1894)
- April 25 – Frederick W. Seward, American politician (b. 1830)
- April 26 – John Bunny, American actor (b. 1863)
- April 27
  - William Barnard Rhodes-Moorhouse, English airman, first aviator awarded Victoria Cross (b. 1887)
  - Alexander Scriabin, Russian composer (b. 1872)
- April 30 – Edward D. Easton, founder and president of Columbia Phonograph Company (b. 1856)

=== May ===
- May 7 – Alfred Gwynne Vanderbilt, American sportsman (b. 1877; died in the Sinking of the RMS Lusitania)
- May 9
  - François Faber, Luxembourgish cyclist (killed in action) (b. 1887)
  - Anthony Wilding, New Zealand tennis player (killed in action) (b. 1883)
- May 18 – Sir William Bridges, Australian army general (b. 1861)
- May 24 – John Condon, Irish private soldier in British Army, claimed as youngest British soldier to die in WWI (killed in action) (b. 1896)
- May 26
  - Emil Lask, German philosopher (killed in action) (b. 1875)
  - Julian Grenfell, English poet (killed in action) (b. 1888)
- May 30 – Marcelo Azcárraga Palmero, 3-time Prime Minister of Spain (b. 1832)
- May 31 – Victor Child Villiers, 7th Earl of Jersey, 18th governor of New South Wales (b. 1845)

=== June ===
- June 5 – Henri Gaudier-Brzeska, French artist and sculptor (killed in action) (b. 1891)
- June 7 – Charles Reed Bishop, American businessman, philanthropist in Hawaii (b. 1822)
- June 10 – Ignatius Maloyan, Ottoman Armenian Eastern Catholic archbishop, martyr and saint (b. 1869)
- June 13 – Zbigniew Dunin-Wasowicz, Polish military leader (killed in action) (b. 1882)
- June 19 – Benjamin F. Isherwood, American admiral, United States Navy Engineer-in-Chief (b. 1822)
- June 25 – Tok Janggut, Malayan rebel leader (killed in action) (b. 1853)
- Stefano P. Israelian, Ottoman Armenian Catholic bishop, martyr (b. 1866)

=== July ===
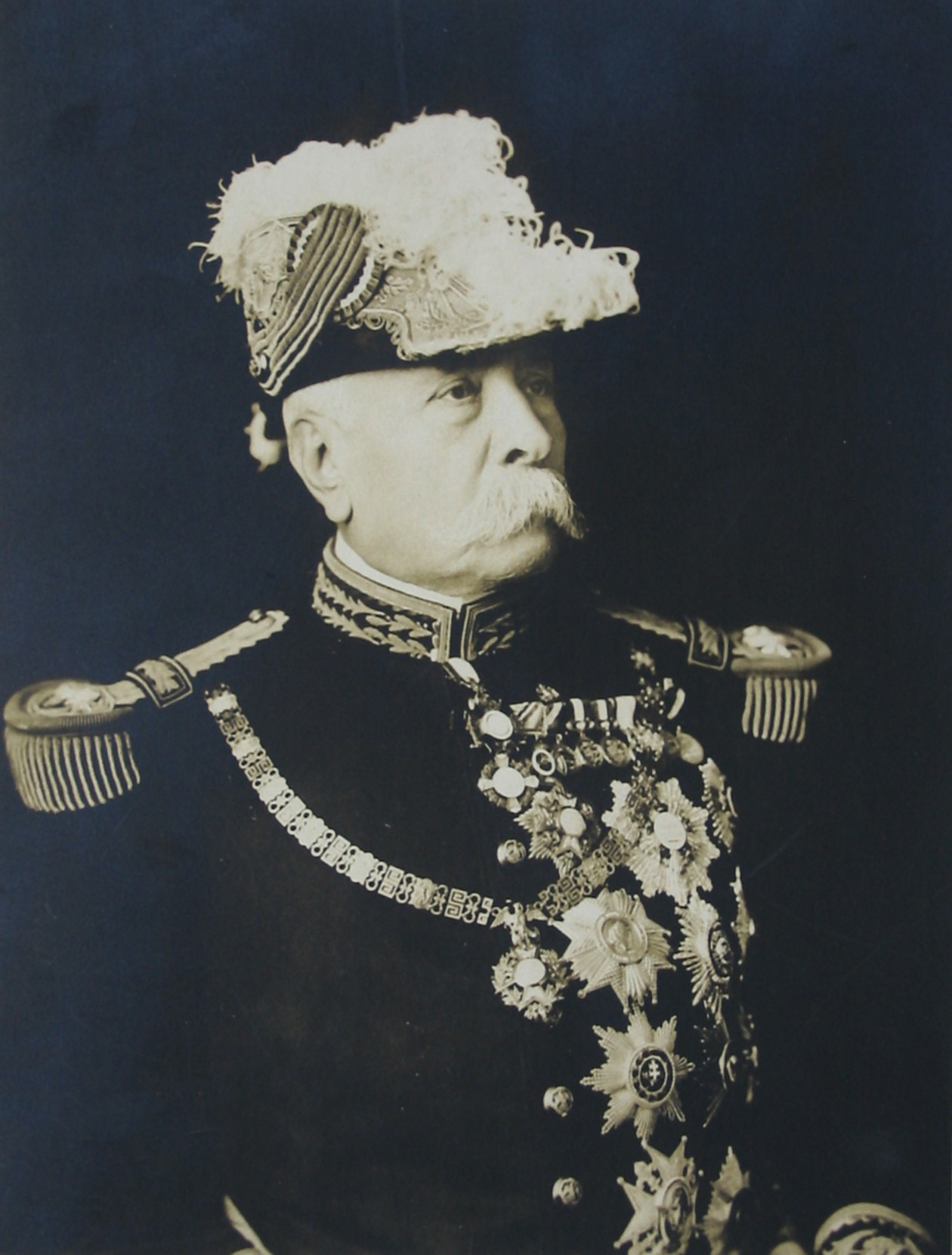
Porfirio Diaz

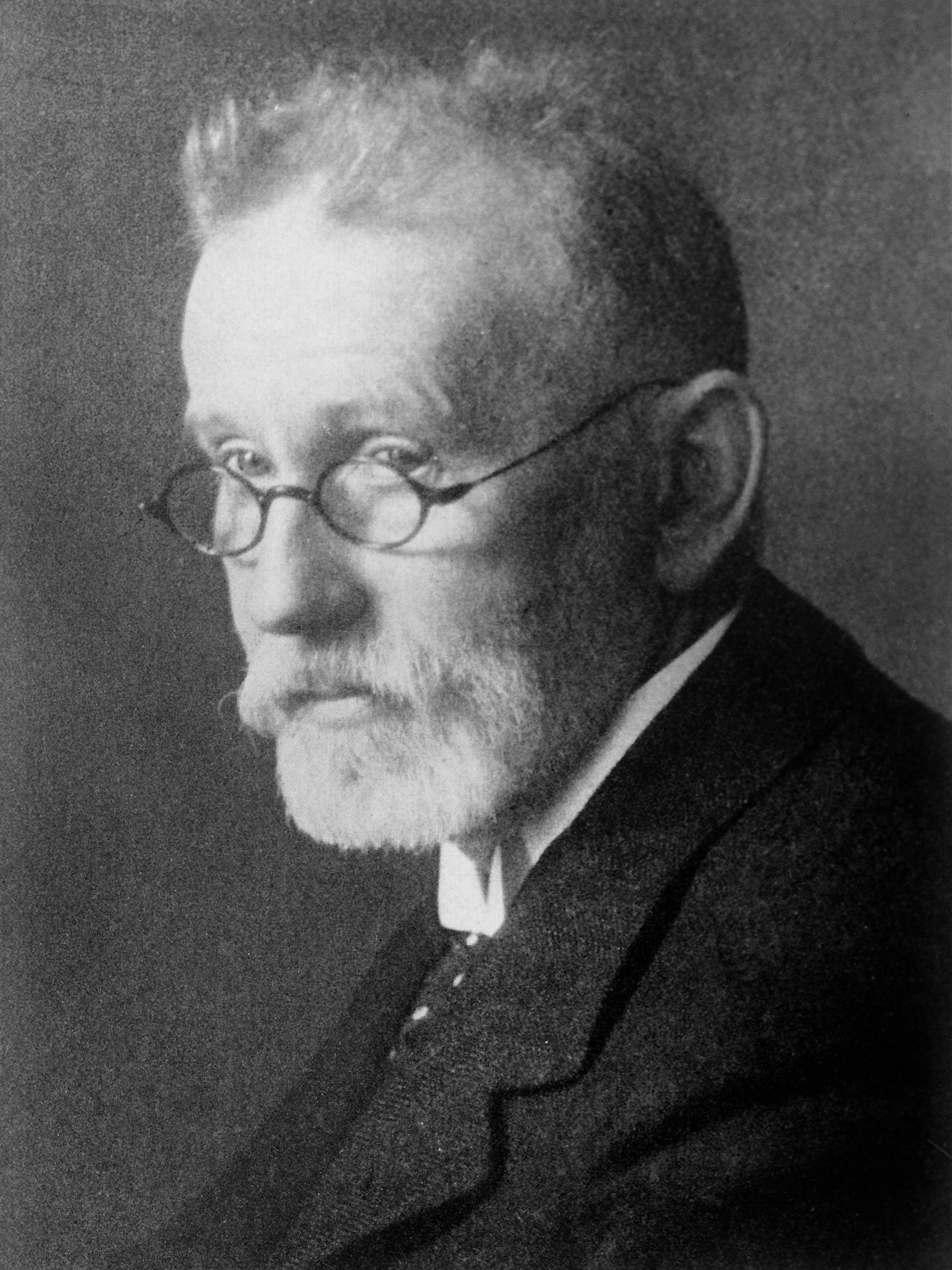
Paul Ehrlich

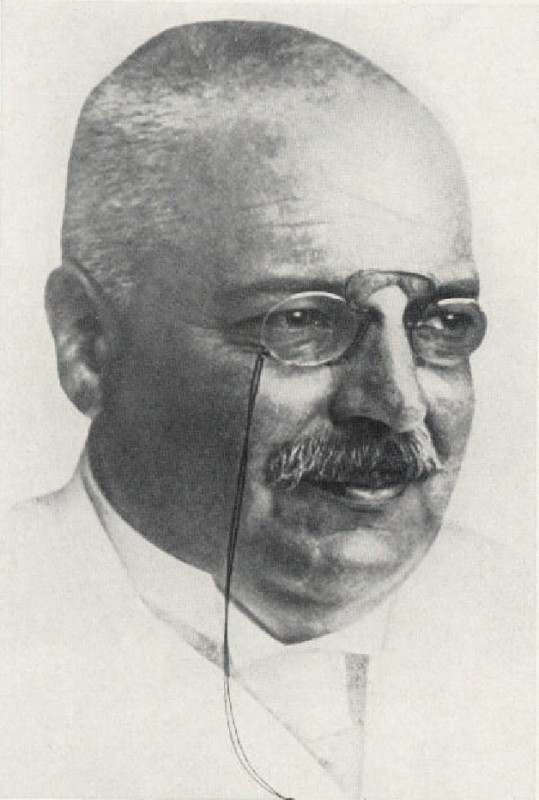
Alois Alzheimer

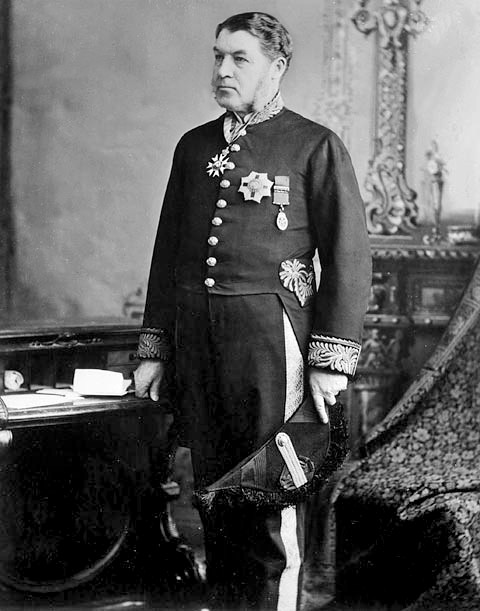
Charles Tupper

- July 2 – Porfirio Díaz, 29th president of Mexico (b. 1830)
- July 6
  - Lawrence Hargrave, Australian engineer (b. 1850)
  - Carl Erik Johan Mannerheim, Finnish nobleman and banker (b. 1865)
- July 10 – Alice Bellvadore Sams Turner, American physician (b. 1859)
- July 16 – Ellen G. White, American prophetess, co-founder of the Seventh-day Adventist Church, most translated American author (b. 1827)
- July 18 – Ozra Amander Hadley, American politician (b. 1826)
- July 22 – Sir Sandford Fleming, Canadian engineer and inventor (b. 1827)
- July 25 – Virginie Amélie Avegno Gautreau, American-born French socialite, model for the painting Portrait of Madame X (b. 1859)
- July 30 – Charles Becker, American policeman and murderer (executed) (b. 1870)

=== August ===
- August 10 – Henry Moseley, English physicist (killed in action) (b. 1887)
- August 16 – Kálmán Széll, 13th prime minister of Hungary (b. 1843)
- August 17 – Leo Frank, Jewish-American factory superintendent who was lynched after the murder of Mary Phagan (b. 1884)
- August 20
  - Paul Ehrlich, German scientist, recipient of the Nobel Prize in Physiology or Medicine (b. 1854)
  - Carlos Finlay, Cuban pathologist (b. 1833)
- August 21 – Josiah T. Settle, American lawyer and politician (b. 1850)
- August 30
  - Antonio Flores Jijón, 13th president of Ecuador (b. 1833)
  - Pascual Orozco, Mexican revolutionary (b. 1882)
- August 31 – Adolphe Pégoud, French acrobatic pilot, World War I fighter ace (killed in action) (b. 1889)

=== September ===
- September 1 – August Stramm, German poet, playwright (killed in action) (b. 1874)
- September 9
  - Antonín Petrof, Czech piano maker (b. 1839)
  - Albert Spalding, American baseball player, sporting goods manufacturer (b. 1850)
- September 11 – William Sprague IV, American politician from Rhode Island (b. 1830)
- September 13 – Andrew L. Harris, American Civil War hero, 44th governor of Ohio (b. 1835)
- September 21 – Anthony Comstock, American anti-indecency reformer (b. 1844)
- September 26 – Keir Hardie, British labour leader (b. 1856)
- September 27 – Fergus Bowes-Lyon, brother of Queen Elizabeth The Queen Mother (killed in action) (b. 1889)

=== October ===
- October 4
  - Karl Staaff, 11th prime minister of Sweden (b. 1860)
  - John Rigby, grandfather of Eleanor Rigby, to whom Paul McCartney attributes a subconscious influence on naming the song with the same name (b.1843)
- October 7 – Friedrich Hasenöhrl, Austrian physicist (b. 1874)
- October 10 – Albert Cashier, born Jennie Hodgers, Irish American soldier (b. 1843)
- October 12 – Edith Cavell, British nurse, war heroine (shot) (b. 1865)
- October 13 – Charles Sorley, British poet (killed in action) (b. 1895)
- October 15 – Theodor Boveri, German biologist (b. 1862)
- October 16 – Zdeňka Wiedermannová-Motyčková, Moravian pioneer of female education (heart attack) (b. 1868)
- October 22 – Wilhelm Windelband, German philosopher (b. 1848)
- October 23 – W. G. Grace, English cricketer (b. 1848)
- October 26 – August Bungert, German composer, poet (b. 1845)
- October 30 – Sir Charles Tupper, 6th prime minister of Canada (b. 1821)
- October 31 – Blanche Walsh, American actress (b. 1873)

=== November ===
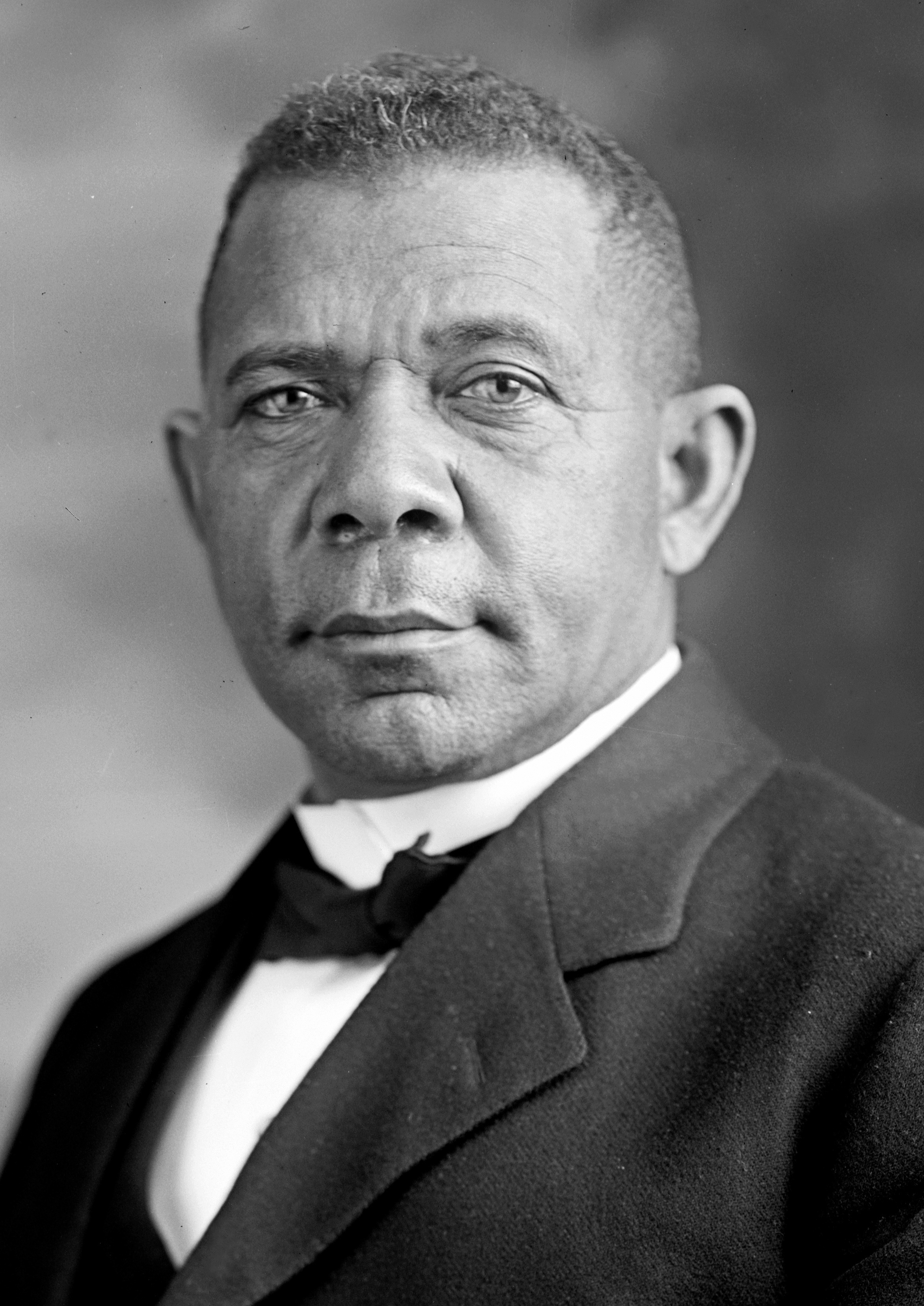
Booker T. Washington

- November 5 – Thomas Trollope, 3rd Baron Kesteven, British soldier (killed in action) (born 1891)
- November 14
  - Theodor Leschetizky, Polish pianist and composer (b. 1830)
  - Booker T. Washington, American educator (b. 1856)
- November 15 – Félix de Blochausen, 6th prime minister of Luxembourg (b. 1834)
- November 21 – Dixie Haygood, American magician (b. 1861)
- November 28 – Mubarak Al-Sabah, Emir of Kuwait (b. 1837)

=== December ===
- December 14 – Eva Gouel, second girlfriend of Pablo Picasso
- December 18 – Sir Henry Roscoe, English chemist (b. 1833)
- December 18 – Édouard Vaillant, French Socialist politician (b. 1840)
- December 19 – Alois Alzheimer, German psychiatrist, neuropathologist (b. 1864)
- December 22 – Rose Talbot Bullard, American medical doctor, professor (b. 1864)
- December 31 – Tommaso Salvini, Italian actor (b. 1829)

== Nobel Prizes ==

- Chemistry – Richard Willstätter
- Literature – Romain Rolland
- Medicine – not awarded
- Peace – not awarded
- Physics – William Henry Bragg and William Lawrence Bragg
