= Simon Douglas =

- Born: c. 1843; South Carolina, United States
- Died: 8 March 1950 (aged c. 107)
- Burial place: Hackensack, New Jersey, United States
- Children: 1 son and daughter

Simon Douglas (c. 1843 – 8 March 1950) was a former slave who lived to become the last American Civil War soldier in the state of New Jersey.

Douglas was born around 1843, as a slave on a plantation in Fairfield County, South Carolina. In 1862, during the American Civil War, he went to the front lines as a body servant for his masters' son in the Confederate Army. Douglas became free by 1864 and moved north as a blacksmith and bummer (a nickname for foragers) of Maj. Gen. William Tecumseh Sherman of the Union Army.

In 1866, Douglas settled in what was to become Fairview, Bergen County, New Jersey. He married a local resident, with whom he had a son and daughter. He ran his own blacksmithing business into his 90s. He lived there until he died on March 8, 1950.

He is interred in Hackensack Cemetery (#4738, Sec 16, Row 12).
