= Hackensack Cemetery =

Cemetery in Bergen County, New Jersey, US

Coordinates: 40°54′17″N 74°02′09″W

Hackensack Cemetery is a cemetery located in Hackensack, New Jersey, United States, founded by Baptists, Dutch Reformed, and Congregational benefactors in the 1890s, as a result of overcrowding in local churchyards and availability of open space. The same group of prominent Hackensack men organized the Johnson Free Public Library. It's the burial place of Edward D. Easton, & Ben E. King.

== Unmarked notable burials ==
- Simon Douglas (1843–1950), former slave who lived to become the last US Civil War soldier in the state of New Jersey
- Victor Hugo Green (1892–1960), publisher of The Negro Motorist Green Book travel guides
- Archibald C. Hart (1873–1935), represented New Jersey's 6th congressional district from 1912–1913 and 1913–1917.
- Stan Pitula, pitcher for the Cleveland Indians
- John R. Ramsey (1862–1933), represented New Jersey's 6th congressional district from 1917 to 1921.
- Arshavir Shirakian (1900–1973), Armenian national hero and avenger of the Armenian genocide
- Charles H. Voorhis (1833–1896), represented New Jersey's 5th congressional district from 1879 to 1881.

== See also ==
- Bergen County Cemeteries
