= Edward D. Easton =

American businessman and founder of Columbia Records (1856–1915)

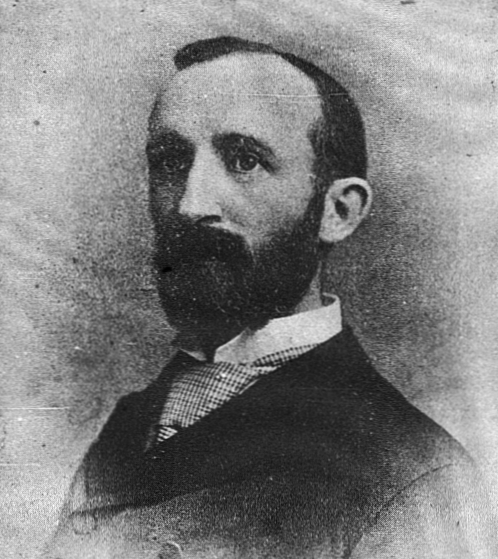
- Easton in 1891
- Born: Edward Denison Easton; April 10, 1856; Gloucester, Massachusetts, U.S.
- Died: April 30, 1915 (aged 59); Arcola, New Jersey, U.S.
- Resting place: Hackensack Cemetery, (Hackensack, New Jersey)

Edward Denison Easton (April 10, 1856 – April 30, 1915) was the founder and president of the Columbia Phonograph Company. Under Easton's leadership, Columbia developed from one of many regional subsidiaries of the North American Phonograph Company, which, along with Edison Records and Victor Talking Machine Co., was one of the nation's three largest record companies of the early 20th century.

== Early life and education ==
Easton was born on April 10, 1856 in Essex, Massachusetts. He began his career as a court reporter before earning a law degree from Georgetown University in Washington, D.C. in 1889.

== Career ==
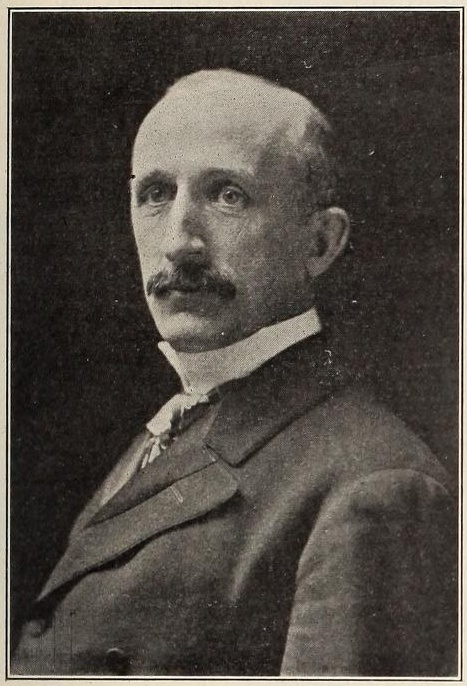
Easton in April 1909

His experience in reporting and stenography spurred his early interest in the nascent graphophone, which was then being marketed by the American Graphophone Company, based in Washington, D.C. American Graphophone's technology was consolidated with Thomas Edison's phonograph under the North American Phonograph Company in 1888, and the Columbia Phonograph Company established in January 1889 as one of its first regional subsidiaries. Though Easton and Columbia initially focused on stenography and related business applications, they quickly realized the financial potential of entertainment recording, using the automatic, or 'nickel-in-the-slot' phonograph, recording John Philip Sousa's U.S. Marine Band, and whistler John Yorke AtLee.

Columbia was North American's most successful subsidiary until North American's assignment and effective demise in 1894. Under Easton's leadership, Columbia began marketing discs in 1901 and ceased manufacturing cylinders in 1912. Easton remained president of Columbia until his death in April 1915, and was credited with expertly navigating the company to the top of the world's music recording industry.

== Personal life ==
In January 1876, Easton married Hattie Kaldenback from his hometown of Essex, Massachusetts in Washington, D.C.; she died on April 17, 1881. He then married Helen Mortimer Jefferis from West Chester, Pennsylvania.

== Death ==
Easton died on April 30, 1915, in Paramus, New Jersey, at age 59. He was interred in Hackensack Cemetery in Hackensack, New Jersey.
