= Abolition of the Ottoman sultanate =

Abolition of the monarchy in Turkey

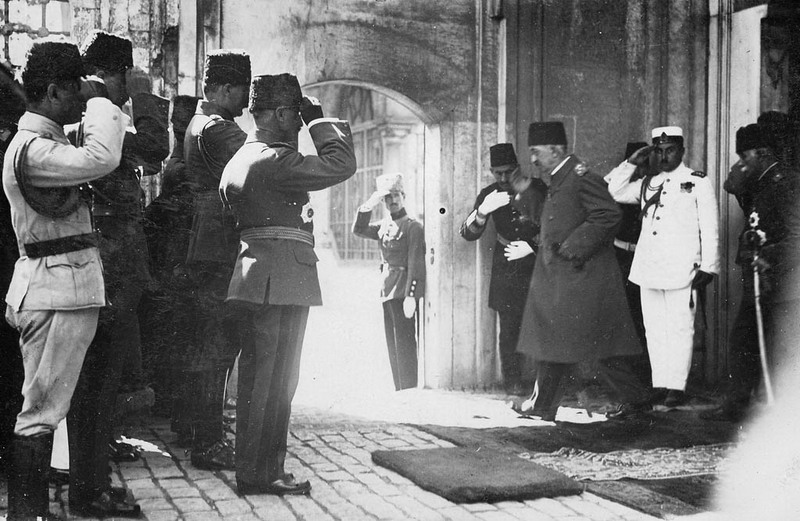
Mehmed VI departing from the back door of the Dolmabahçe Palace

The Grand National Assembly of Turkey abolished the monarchy on 1 November 1922 and ended the Ottoman Empire, which had lasted from c. 1299. On 11 November 1922, at the Conference of Lausanne, the sovereignty of the Grand National Assembly exercised by the Government in Angora (now Ankara) over Turkey was recognized. The last sultan, Mehmed VI, departed the Ottoman capital, Constantinople (now Istanbul), on 17 November 1922 aboard HMS Malaya. The legal position was solidified with the signing of the Treaty of Lausanne on 24 July 1923 and the proclamation of the Republic of Turkey on 29 October 1923. In March 1924 the Caliphate was abolished, marking the end of the last remnant of the former monarchy.

== Background ==
The Ottoman entry into World War I with the Central Powers occurred on 11 November 1914. The Middle Eastern theatre of World War I ended with the signing of the Armistice of Mudros on 30 October 1918. The Occupation of Istanbul by British, French and Italian forces occurred on 13 November 1918.

The partitioning of the Ottoman Empire began with the Treaty of London (1915) and continued with multiple agreements, mostly unilateral among the Allies. British troops began to occupy the key buildings of the Empire and arrest nationalists after the establishment of military rule on the night of 15 March 1920. On 18 March 1920 the Ottoman parliament met and sent a protest to the Allies that it was unacceptable to arrest five of its members. The parliament met for a last time to prorogue itself, and that marked the end of the Ottoman political system.Sultan Mehmed VI dissolved the General Assembly of the Ottoman Empire on 11 April 1920. The Istanbul government, with the bureaucracy, but without the parliament, was left active with the Sultan as the decision maker.

The Treaty of Sèvres on 10 August 1920 finalized the partitioning of the Empire. At the time, in waves, approximately 150 politicians were exiled to Malta. The Turkish national movement, led by Mustafa Kemal, established the Grand National Assembly of Turkey in Ankara on 23 April 1920.

The Grand National Assembly of Turkey waged the Turkish War of Independence. The war was against the monarchist Istanbul government. Sultan Mehmed VI was the Caliph. The Istanbul government, without a parliament, formed the Kuva-yi Inzibatiye, known as the "Army of the Caliphate", to fight against the Grand National Assembly's Kuva-yi Milliye.

Conflicts occurred at Bolu, Düzce, Hendek, Adapazarı, along with the other revolts during the Turkish War of Independence. The Caliphate army was sympathetic to the caliphate, hence the name, and armed by the British. The strategic goal of the Caliphate army and of the British was to prevent the National Forces advancing towards the Bosporus straits. The Army of the Caliphate was defeated by the Kuva-yi Milliye. Although the Kuva-yi Milliye was regarded as the first step of resistance in the liberation of Turkey, irregular warfare was abandoned later. Before the Greek war began, Kuva-yi Milliye became the seed of an organized Turkish army, which then became the Turkish Armed Forces with the declaration of a Republic.

Sultan's force against Grand National Assembly of Turkey

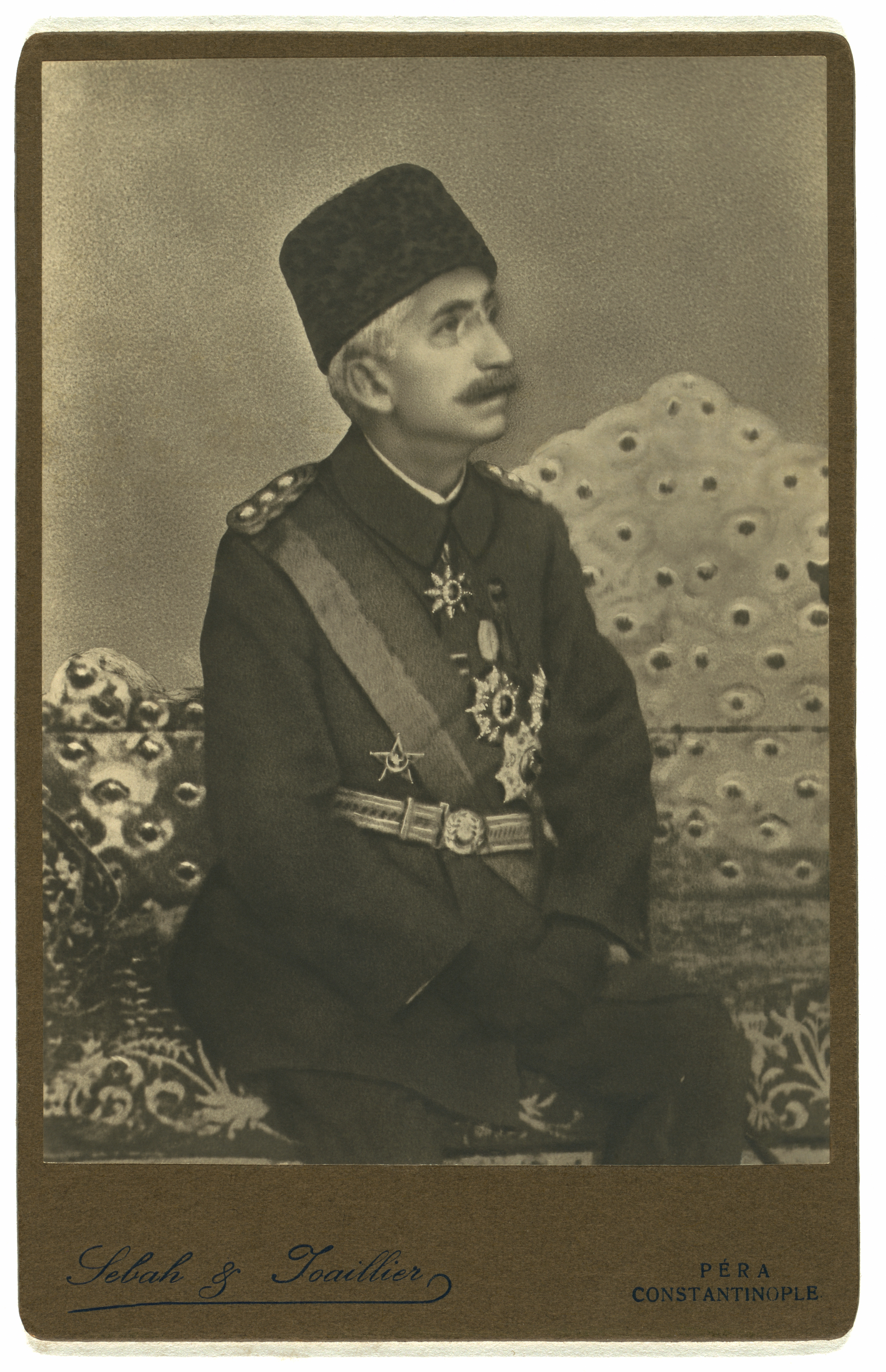
c. 1920 Sultan Mehmed VI on his throne.

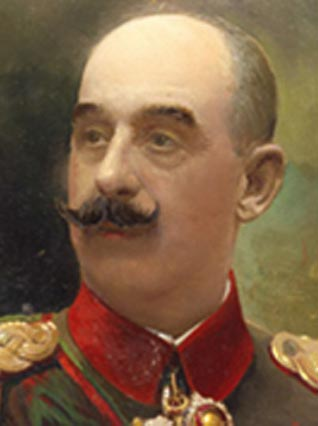
Süleyman Şefik Pasha, commander of the Caliphate Army

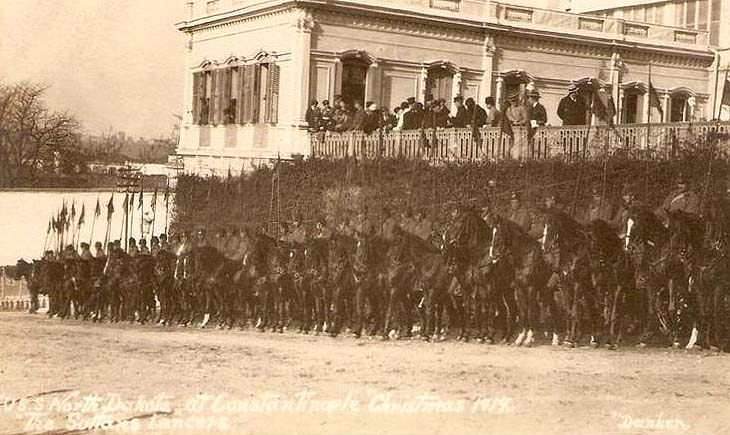
Caliphate Army

== End of the Ottoman Empire ==
The Ottoman Empire's sovereignty was embodied in the dynasty of Osman I, who was its founder and namesake. His family had ruled since 1299 in an unbroken lineage throughout the empire's history. The Ottoman sultan maintained supreme authority over the Ottoman Empire's polity. The sultan was the empire's sole and absolute regent, head of state and head of government. The grand viziers and polity established by the Ottoman Constitution functioned at the pleasure of the sultan.

An Allied invitation was given to both the Constantinople and Ankara governments to appear at the Conference of Lausanne. Mustafa Kemal was determined that only the Ankara government would be represented at the conference. On 1 November 1922, the Grand National Assembly declared that the Sultanate's Constantinople government was no longer the legal representative. The Grand National Assembly also resolved that Constantinople had not been the capital of the nation since its occupation by the Allies. Furthermore, they declared that the Sultanate was to be abolished. The abolition of the sultanate ended the Ottoman Empire. After hearing of the resolution, Mehmed VI sought refuge aboard the British warship Malaya on 17 November. The remaining ministers in his government accepted the new political reality. There is no official document that declared the state capitulated by the Ottoman Government or sultan; the system resolved by itself. The Conference of Lausanne, on 11 November 1922, recognized the sovereignty of the Grand National Assembly of Turkey replacing the Ottoman Empire.

A list of 600 names to the Conference of Lausanne was presented, and were to be declared personae non gratae. The list, which is a Who's Who of the Ottoman Empire, had the purpose of eliminating the ruling elite of the Ottomans. Negotiations at Lausanne limited the number to 150, and the treaty was signed on 24 July 1923.

The Ottoman dynasty embodied the Ottoman Caliphate since the sixteenth century, starting with the reign of Selim I. The head of the Ottoman family kept the title caliph, power over all Muslims, as Mehmed's cousin Abdülmecid II took the title. The Ottoman dynasty was left as a political-religious successor to Muhammad and a leader of the entire Muslim community without borders in a post Ottoman Empire. Abdülmecid II's title was challenged in 1916 by the leader of the Arab Revolt King Hussein bin Ali of Hejaz, who denounced Mehmet V, but his kingdom was defeated and annexed by Ibn Saud in 1925.

Greek, Bulgarian and Serb subjects left the empire during the decline and modernization of the Ottoman Empire (1828–1908), while the Albanian and Armenian (Armenian national movement and First Republic of Armenia) subjects left or were killed during the defeat and dissolution of the Ottoman Empire (1908–1922). By 1922 most of the remaining inhabitants of Turkey were Muslims of either Turkish or Kurdish ethnicity. The Grand National Assembly of Turkey declared itself the Republic of Turkey on 29 October 1923.

There were members of the Ottoman dynasty who were in Turkey after the declaration of the republic. An exile list was also created and put into effect by the Republic of Turkey (Note: In March 1924, six months after the foundation, the vote came to assembly with the abolition of the caliphate.) on 23 April 1924 (revised on 1 June 1924) which included the names of 120 adherents of the deposed Ottoman dynasty.

== See also ==
- Abolition of the Caliphate
- Dissolution of the Ottoman Empire
- Khilafat Movement

== Bibliography ==
- Finkel, Caroline (2007). Osman's Dream: The History of the Ottoman Empire. Basic Books.
