= Anzavur Ahmed Pasha =

Ottoman military officer (1885–1921)

Ahmet Anzavur Anchok
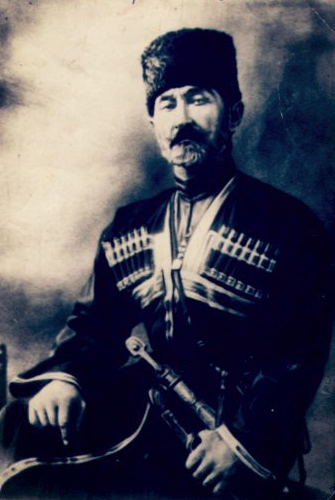
- Anzavur Ahmed Pasha
- Born: 1885
- Died: May 15, 1921 (aged 35–36); Adliye
- Burial place: Cihadiye, Biga
- Military career
- Allegiance: Ottoman Empire
- Branch: Kuva-yi Inzibatiye
- Rank: Gendarme officier Major; Pasha
- Conflicts: World War I Revolt of Ahmet Anzavur

Anzavur Ahmed Anchok Pasha (Adyghe: Анцокъу Ахьмэд Анзауыр Пащэ; Turkish: Ahmet Anzavur Paşa; 1885 – 15 April 1921) was an Ottoman soldier, gendarme officer, pasha, and militia leader of Circassian origin. He became a guerrilla leader in Anatolia and started a series of unsuccessful pro-Ottoman operations against the provisional Government of the Grand National Assembly.

== Biography ==
Anzavur was born in the Circassian Anchok family, which was deported to the Ottoman Empire during the Circassian genocide. He served as a major during World War I and was affiliated with the Special Organization. After the Ottomans lost the war, he believed that the only route to salvation was to cooperate with the invading British forces, as he was loyal to the caliph, and he believed Mustafa Kemal Atatürk's Turkish National Movement was not only blasphemous, but also would eventually fail and do nothing but anger the British-Greek forces.

=== First revolt ===
The first uprising of Ahmet Anzavur occurred in Manyas in October 1919. Anzavur's declaration to the people of Manyas was that he intended to capture or kill Hacim Muhittin Çarıklı, the Nationalist commander in the region of Balıkesir. The forces he raised would be used to defend the power of the Sultanate, located in Istanbul, from the growing threat of Nationalist forces, based in Ankara. Anzavur sent two telegrams the following day, one to the sultan and the other to Karesi Mustarrif Ali Riza, stating, "It is the duty of all true Muslims to defeat the Nationalists". The threat was well understood by the Nationalists, and they immediately made preparations to counter the threat. Anzavur took a cohort of his followers to carry out attacks on the provisional Turkish government's offices and troops, all the while recruiting more men during November 1919. After avoiding talks with Nationalists about the cessation of hostilities, Anzavur and his men were labeled common criminals and tools of the British and the palace.

The first actual battle of the rebellion occurred on 15 November north of Balıkesir. Anzavur's forces took heavy losses and were forced to retreat north through Susurluk, whilst being pursued by Köprülülü Hamdi. By 20 November, fighting had broken out around Gönen, Manyas, Karacabey, Biga, and Susurluk. By the end of November, Anzavur's forces had to flee from Çerkes Ethem's forces. As winter approached, Anzavur disbanded his forces.

Ahmet Fevzi Paşa, also a Circassian, was sent to prevent Anzavur's influence in the region from growing. He attempted to recruit local Circassians for the Nationalist Kuva-yi Milliye, but scholars believe that he was unsuccessful.

=== Second revolt ===
After a harsh winter, Anzavur began recruiting for another campaign. This army would be known as the Army of Muhammad. Hostilities began again on 16 February 1920. As the vanguard of Anzavur's motley army entered Biga, shots rang out. Hamidi fled to a nearby weapons depot as the town fell to Anzavur, the men of the army and town embracing each other. His men refused to return to the town and shoot their fellow citizens. He then ordered his second-in-command, Kani Bey, to return to town and execute Kara Hasan. Kani carried out the order and gunned down Hasan and 13 others in cold blood. Hasan's death angered the citizens of Biga. A mob of citizens attacked Kani Bey's home; he initially escaped with the help of a neighbor but was cut down by the mob's bullets shortly afterward. Hamidi was cornered, trying to link up with other military officers in the area, by Pomaks and tied, beaten, and killed by having his neck snapped.

Anzavur's ranks began to swell as the victory in Biga was consolidated over the following month. A committee of three local notables and paramilitary leaders was organized to handle local issues. Shortly after, a former regional inspector named Samih Rıfat Horozcu was sent to plead with the locals to rejoin the Nationalists, but his pleas fell on deaf ears.

By the middle of March, a column of 500 Nationalist troops was organized and sent to recapture Biga and the surrounding area. Anzavur led the defense. Those who followed him, largely Circassians and Pomaks, were mostly armed with sticks and axes. After this defeat, Nationalist officers and soldiers began to desert their posts. Anzavur used this victory to recruit more fighters from the Gönen area. On 4 April, troops led by Anzavur and Gavur Imam entered Gönen, executing and pillaging with little resistance. By 6 March, Bandırma, Karacabey, and Kirmasti had fallen in rapid succession to the Army of Muhammad. As Anzavur pushed Nationalist leaders in southern Mamara, he knew the end was near. Çerkes Ethem was called upon to bring the rebellion to heel. Ethem was given 2,000 soldiers to do so. On 16 April, Anzavur was dealt a resounding defeat near the village of Yahyaköy. By 19 April, Bandırma had fallen to Ethem, marking the gradual defeat of Anzavur and his forces. By the end of April, the Army of Muhammad had melted away, as at the end of the first rebellion, and Anzavur returned to Istanbul on an English vessel.

=== Third revolt and the death of Ahmet Anzavur ===
With Anzavur's defeat at Yahyaköy, another revolt had broken out in the Adapazarı region. The danger was recognized by the Nationalist government. Ethem was called upon again, fresh from putting down Anzavur's rebellion. His forces retook Adapazarı and Sapanca without a fight. On 26 May, Ethem entered the town of Düzce.

With the outbreak of a revolt in Düzce, the Ottoman government announced the creation of a new army, the Kuva-i Inzibatiye, to put down the Nationalist Kuva-yi Milliye. This army was to be composed of 1,000 unemployed soldiers under the command of Süleyman Şefik Pasha. It was announced on April 26 that Ahmet Anzavur would be given a command in the area. On May 4, Süleyman Şefik Pasha arrived in Izmit, with Anzavur arriving four days later with 500 men he had recruited from Biga.

Anzavur's contributions to the fighting were negligible, as he suffered a broken leg in a week of fighting with locals and Nationalist forces. His forces continued to fight a while longer, but were forced to retreat by the end of June. Anzavur faded into obscurity for about a year, until he began recruiting again. In May 1921, a group of pro-Nationalist paramilitary leaders found out about Anzavur's movements. The leader of the paramilitary groups was Arnavud Abdurrahman. Abdurrahman and his men ambushed and killed Ahmet Anzavur outside of Karabiga.
