= Revolts during the Turkish War of Independence =

Revolts against the Turkish National Movement (1919–1923)

A number of revolts against the Turkish Revolutionaries broke out during the Turkish War of Independence.

Mustafa Kemal, who was the leader of the nationalist government of Turkey during the war of independence was primarily concerned about subduing the internal revolts and establishing domestic security. To achieve this, the parliament passed the Law of Treachery to the Homeland and established Mobile Gendarmerie Troops. These revolts delayed the nationalist movement's struggle against the occupying foreign forces on several fronts. These revolts, such as those by Ahmed Anzavur, were put down with some difficulty by nationalist forces.

Name	Date	Area	Opponent	Goal	Conclusion
Ottoman Controlled
Revolt of Ahmet Anzavur	(2 November 1919- 16 April 1920)	Manyas, Susurluk, Gönen	Kuva-yi Seyyare	?	?
Kuva-yi Inzibatiye	(18 April 1920- 25 June 1920)	Bolu, Düzce, Hendek, Adapazarı	Kuva-yi Seyyare	Caliphate army, sympathetic to Islamism and the ailing monarchy, armed by the British	Prevention of National Forces towards the straits
Feudal Originated Riots
Yozgat Rebellion	?	Yozgat	Kuva-yi Seyyare	1) Çerkez Ethem, 2) Turkish National Forces	?
Çopur Musa Rebellion	?	Afyon	Kuva-yi Seyyare	Supported by Greeks to prevent organization of national forces.	?
Konya Rebellion	?	Konya	Turkish National Forces	Supported by French, British, and Italian military. The rioters opened a jihad against the Mustafa Kemal's forces, claiming that he aimed to abolish the 1300-year-old Islamic caliphate, held by the Ottomans since 1517	?
Milli Tribe Rebellion	1 June- 8 July 1920	Urfa	Turkish National Forces (5th army)	This main Kurdish tribe was rioted against the Nationals supported by French, and British military and Armenians and other smaller Kurdish tribes	?
Demirci Mehmet Efe Rebellion	?	?	Refet Bey	?	?
Çerkez Ethem Rebellion	?	?	İsmet Bey	?	?
Separatist revolts
Koçgiri rebellion	July 1920- June 1921	?	?	?	?

== List of rebellions ==
1. Ali Batı Affair (11 May 1919 – 18 August 1919)
2. Ali Galip Affair (20 August 1919 – 15 September 1919)
3. First Bozkır Uprising (29 September 1919 – 4 October 1919)
4. Second Bozkır Uprising (20 October 1919 – 4 November 1919)
5. First Ahmet Anzavur Uprising (25 October 1919 – 30 November 1919)
6. First Düzce Uprising (13 April 1920 – 31 May 1920)
7. Second Düzce Uprising (19 July 1920 – 23 September 1920)
8. Sheikh Eşref Uprising (Hart Olayı) (26 October 1919 – 24 December 1919)
9. Kızılkuyu Affair (28 October 1919 - 29 October 1919)
10. Apa Clashes (28 October 1919)
11. Dinek Clashes (1 November 1919)
12. Demirkapı Clashes (15 November 1919)
13. Second Ahmet Anzavur Uprising (16 February 1920 – 19 April 1920)
14. Kuvâ-yi İnzibâtiye (18 April 1920 - 25 June 1920)
15. Third Ahmet Anzavur Uprising (10 May 1920 – 22 May 1920)
16. First Yozgat Uprising/First Çapanoğlu Uprising (15 May 1920 – 27 August 1920)
17. Second Yozgat Uprising/Second Çapanoğlu Uprising (5 September 1920 – 30 December 1920)
18. Zile Uprising (25 May 1920 – 21 June 1920)
19. Aynacıoğulları Uprising (1918 - 21 November 1923)
20. Milli Tribe Uprising (1 June 1920 – 8 September 1920)
21. Cemil Çeto Affair (20 May 1920 – 7 June 1920)
22. İnegöl Affair (20 July 1920 – 20 August 1920)
23. Çopur Musa Uprising (Afyonkarahisar) (21 June 1920)
24. Kula Affair (27 June 1920 – 28 June 1920)
25. Konya Uprising (2 October 1920 – 22 November 1920)
26. Demirci Mehmet Efe Uprising (1 December 1920 – 30 December 1920)
27. Çerkez Ethem Uprising (27 December 1920 – 23 January 1921)
28. Koçgiri/Koçkiri Rebellion (6 March 1921 – 17 June 1921)
29. Revenge Regement Uprising (July 1920)
30. Pontus Uprising (December 1920 - 6 February 1923)
