= Konya rebellion =

Rebellion in Turkey

Konya rebellion Konya Ayaklanması
- Part of Turkish War of Independence
| Date | October 2–6, 1920 |
| Location | Konya region |
| Result | Ankara Government victory |

Commanders and leaders
| (Ottoman Empire) Refet Bey | Delibaş Mehmet Agha |

Strength
| Unknown | c. 600 |

The Konya rebellion (Turkish: Konya Ayaklanması), also known as the Delibaş Rebellion (Turkish: Delibaş Ayaklanması) named after the rebel leader Delibaş Mehmet Agha, was an uprising in Konya against the Turkish national movement during the Turkish War of Independence.

The revolt was initiated by Delibaş Mehmet Agha, who was tasked by Haydar Bey, the Governor of Konya, to recruit for the nationalist Kuva-yi Milliye after he was put in the rank of a major by girding a sword. Delibaş Mehmet Agha, a native of Alibeyhüyüğü town in Çumra, Konya. He recruited around 500 local citizens, and entered Çumra with his troops on October 2, 1920 with the intention to fight against Mustafa Kemal's nationalist movement in the Turkish War of Independence. He was claiming on religious grounds that Mustafa Kemal aimed to abolish the Islamic caliphate, held by the Ottoman sultans since 1517. The militia led by Delibaş Mehmet cut the telegraph lines in Çumra, and proceeded to Konya armed with sticks, daggers, swords, shot guns etc. They entered the city the next day. The clashes between the rebels and the police and gendarmerie protecting the city hall lasted until evening. The rebels looted the houses of sympathizers of the National Movement in addition to the official buildings. They appointed a new governor, police chief and commander of the gendarmerie.

The Government of the Grand National Assembly in Ankara deployed army corps commander Derviş Pasha (1881–1932) and Minister of the Interior Colonel Refet Bey (1877–1963) for the suppression of the rebellion. The regular troops entered the city on October 6, 1920 and quashed the rebellion after fights with the rebels.

Delibaş Mehmet could escape to French-occupied Mersin, where he took shelter. He also served in İzmir a while for the Greek occupation forces. He then returned to Konya, and tried to stage a second revolt in 1921. He was, however, decapitated by his own followers in Çumra.

== See also ==
- Revolts during the Turkish War of Independence
