= Süleyman Şefik Pasha =

Ottoman army officer (1860–1946)

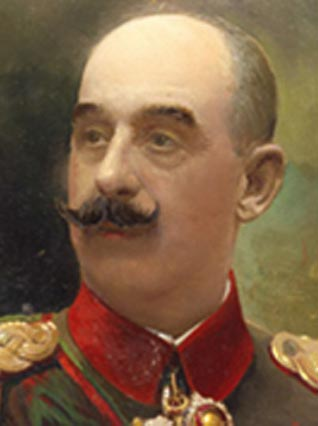
- Born: Süleyman Şefik; 1860; Erzurum, Erzurum Eyalet, Ottoman Empire
- Died: 1946 (aged 85–86); Istanbul, Turkey
- Military career
- Allegiance: Ottoman Empire
- Branch: Ottoman Army
- Rank: General

Süleyman Şefik Pasha (Ottoman Turkish: سلیمان شفیق پاشا, Turkish: Süleyman Şefik Paşa) was the commander of the Kuvâ-yi İnzibâtiye, an army established on 18 April 1920 by the Imperial Government of the Ottoman Empire in order to fight against the Turkish National Movement in the aftermath of World War I during the Turkish War of Independence.

== Biography ==
He was born in 1860 in Erzurum to Ali Kemal Pasha, who served as governor of Rumelia (the Balkans), Tripolitania (Libya), Mosul, and Konya. His family was long known as the Söylemezoğulları (descendants of a man nicknamed Söylemez, "won't tell").

The Kuvâ-i İnzibâtiyye was supported by the British so as to enforce British policy in Anatolia and enforce the partitioning and stabilize the remnants of the defeated Turkish Empire. However, he only held the post for 12 days, after which he resigned due to difficulties from working with Anzavur Ahmed Pasha, a local military commander.

He was the grandfather of Turkish musician Şehrazat and the father of Princess Perizat Osmanoğlu and Siham Kemali Söylemezoğlu, the first mining magnate in Turkey. After the Surname Law of 1934, his family adopted their family name as their official surname, Söylemezoğlu.

He died in 1946 in Istanbul.
