= Government of the Grand National Assembly =

Provisional government based in Ankara

State of Turkey ترکیه دولتی Türkiye Devleti
- 1920–1923
- Flag
- Motto: حاكميّت بلاقيد و شرط ملّتڭدر; Ḥâkimiyet bilâ ḳaydü şarṭ milletiñdir "Sovereignty unconditionally belongs to the Nation"
- Anthem: استقلال مارشى; İstiklal Marşı "Independence March"
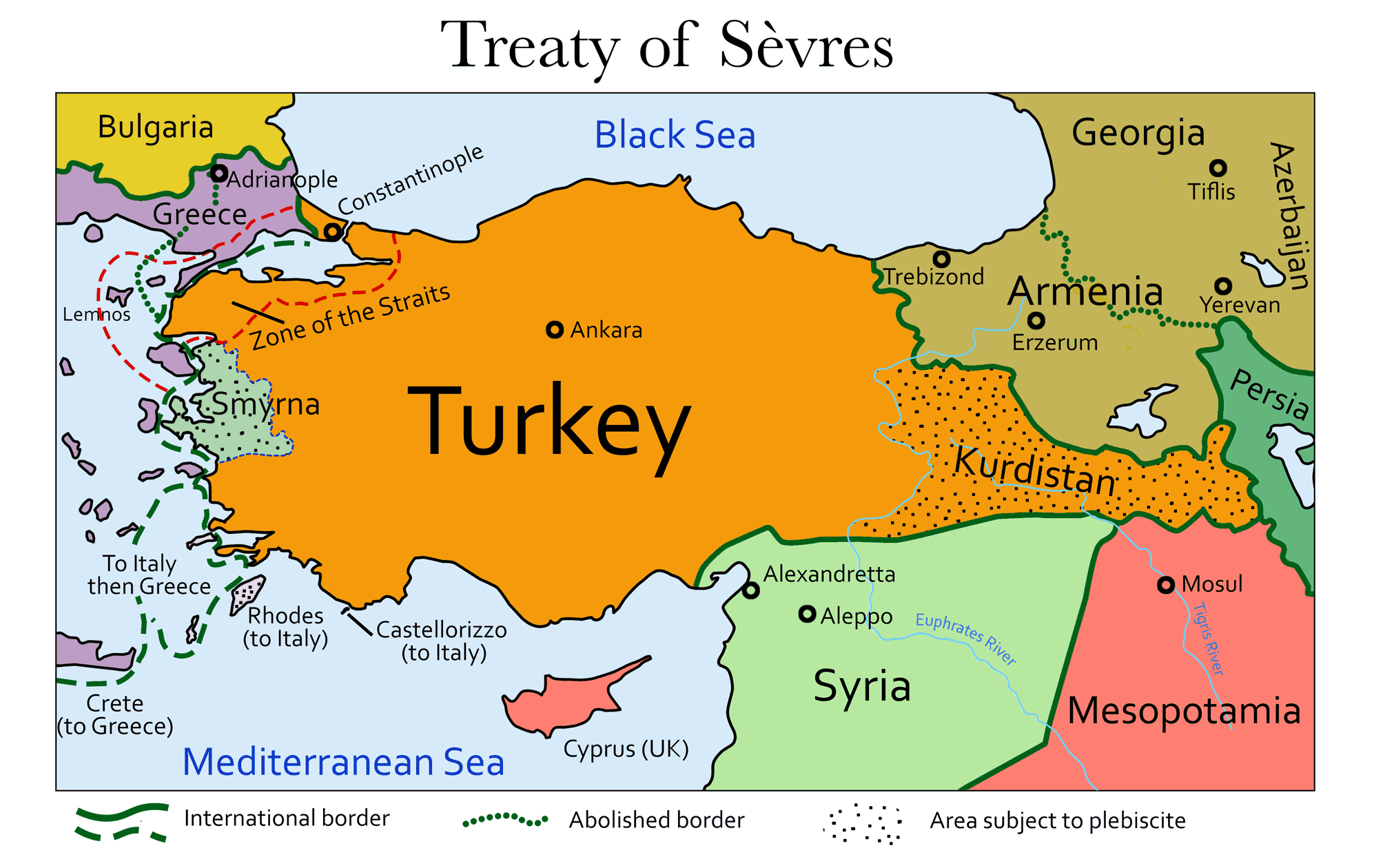
- De Jure Situation in the Ottoman Empire following the Treaty of Sèvres.
- Capital: Ankara (de facto)
- Official languages: Turkish
- Religion: Islam (official)
- Government: Unitary parliamentary republic under a provisional government
- Speaker
  - 1920–1923: Mustafa Kemal^{a}^{b}
- Caliph
  - 1922–1923: Abdülmecid II
- Prime Minister
  - 1920–1921: Mustafa Kemal
  - 1921–1922: Mustafa Fevzi
  - 1922–1923: Hüseyin Rauf
  - 1923: Ali Fethi
- Legislature: Grand National Assembly
- Historical era: War of Independence
  - Parliament established: 23 April 1920
  - Cabinet established: 3 May 1920
  - Constitution adopted: 20 January 1921
  - Armistice of Mudanya: 11 October 1922
  - Sultanate abolished: 1 November 1922
  - Treaty of Lausanne: 24 July 1923
  - Republic proclaimed: 29 October 1923

Population
- 6–7 million
- Currency: Ottoman lira
Preceded by
Ottoman Empire
Armenia
Zone of Smyrna
Occupied Istanbul
Democratic Republic of Georgia
Succeeded by
Republic of Turkey
- Today part of: Turkey
- ^a As "Speaker of the Grand National Assembly"^b As "Commander-in-chief of Army of the Grand National Assembly" after 1921.

The Government of the Grand National Assembly (Turkish: Büyük Millet Meclisi Hükûmeti), self-identified as the State of Turkey (ترکیه دولتی; Türkiye Devleti) or Turkey (ترکیه; Türkiye), commonly known as the Ankara Government (Ankara Hükûmeti), or archaically the Angora Government, was the provisional and revolutionary Turkish government based in Ankara (then known as Angora) during the Turkish War of Independence (1919–1923) and during the final years of the Ottoman Empire. It was led by the Turkish National Movement, as opposed to the crumbling Istanbul government, which was led by the Ottoman Sultan Mehmed VI Vahdeddin.

The provisional government was established on 23 April 1920, after the formal occupation of Istanbul in March 1920, a decision supported by Mehmed VI. A brief civil war between Ankara and Istanbul erupted. The Istanbul government went on to sign the Treaty of Sèvres with the Allied powers, which would have left the Ottoman Empire a colonial satellite of the European powers. During the War of Independence, the Government of the Grand National Assembly amalgamated militia of the Kuva-yi Milliye ("National Forces") into a regular army to fight Greece, Armenia, France, Britain, and Istanbul. After the war, the Ankara Government abolished the Sultanate in November 1922 and the next year proclaimed the Republic of Turkey in October 1923. The Grand National Assembly is today the parliamentary body of Turkey.

== Background ==
At the time the Ankara Government was proclaimed, there existed another Turkish government in the Allied-occupied Constantinople (now Istanbul), namely the Imperial Ottoman Government, often known as the "Constantinople Government" (as opposed to the nationalist Ankara Government) and another Turkish parliament as the Chamber of Deputies. On 12 November 1918, Constantinople was occupied by the Allied forces led by the British. However, the occupying forces did not touch the Parliament and government buildings. On 21 December 1918, the parliament was dissolved by Sultan Vahdettin to hold new elections. As a result of the elections, the last parliament held its first meeting on 12 January 1920. The newly elected Ottoman parliament in Istanbul did not recognize the occupation; they developed a National Pact (Misak-ı Milli). The British, disturbed by the declaration of the National Pact, decided to completely occupy the city with the Allied military forces and seize the government buildings. Following the military occupation of Istanbul on 16 March 1920, the parliament was officially closed on 11 April 1920, under pressure from the occupying forces, in violation of the constitution. While some deputies were arrested, most fled to Anatolia to join the resistance. The new parliament opened in Ankara as a joint effort of these fugitive deputies and the resistance structure in Anatolia, opened on 23 April 1920, shortly after the old parliament was forcibly closed. The new parliament in Ankara declared itself to be the continuation of the parliament closed in Istanbul on 11 April stated that it was loyal to the National Pact and began its work by holding the last meeting of the old parliament as its first meeting. The Ankara Government was officially loyal to the Ottoman Sultan and the Caliphate. The Ankara Government never claimed that it was a new or different state. However, it declared that the Istanbul Government could not govern the country and had no validity due to the occupation of Istanbul. For this reason, it did not use the title "nazır" (minister) for its own cabinet members. Instead, it used the title vekil (acting minister).

The Ankara Government was founded to represent Turkey because the de jure capital, Constantinople, was under occupation. The president of the GNA (renamed the Grand National Assembly of Turkey after 8 February 1921) and later of the Republic of Turkey, was Mustafa Kemal Pasha. Once the Armistice of Mudanya was signed, replacing the Armistice of Mundros (signed by the Ottoman Empire in 1918 at the end of World War I) and ending the Turkish War of Independence, the GNA abolished the imperial Sultanate, which was accused of collaborating with the Allies during the occupation of Turkey.

The Constantinople Government, representing the Ottoman sultanate and the old imperial and monarchical order, initially refused to recognize the Turkish national movement and the Government of the Grand National Assembly in Ankara, holding that it alone was the legitimate government of the Ottoman Empire. It attempted to militarily defeat the Ankara Government using its Kuva-yi Inzibatiye, i.e. the "Forces of Order", commonly known as the "Army of the Caliphate" (as opposed to the GNA's forces, the Kuva-yi Milliye, the "Army of the Nation"), but failed to do so. In 1921, diplomatic teams from both the monarchist Constantinople Government and the republican Ankara Government appeared at the Conference of London. In a surprising move, however, the Ottoman diplomatic team led by Ahmet Tevfik Pasha gave in and allowed the Turkish diplomatic team led by Bekir Sami Kunduh to be the sole representatives of the country at the conference. The Treaty of Lausanne was signed on 24 July 1923, between the representatives of the Allies and of Ankara, thus officially recognizing the government of Ankara as the legitimate Turkish government.

On 29 October, the National Assembly declared the Republic of Turkey.

== Government and politics ==
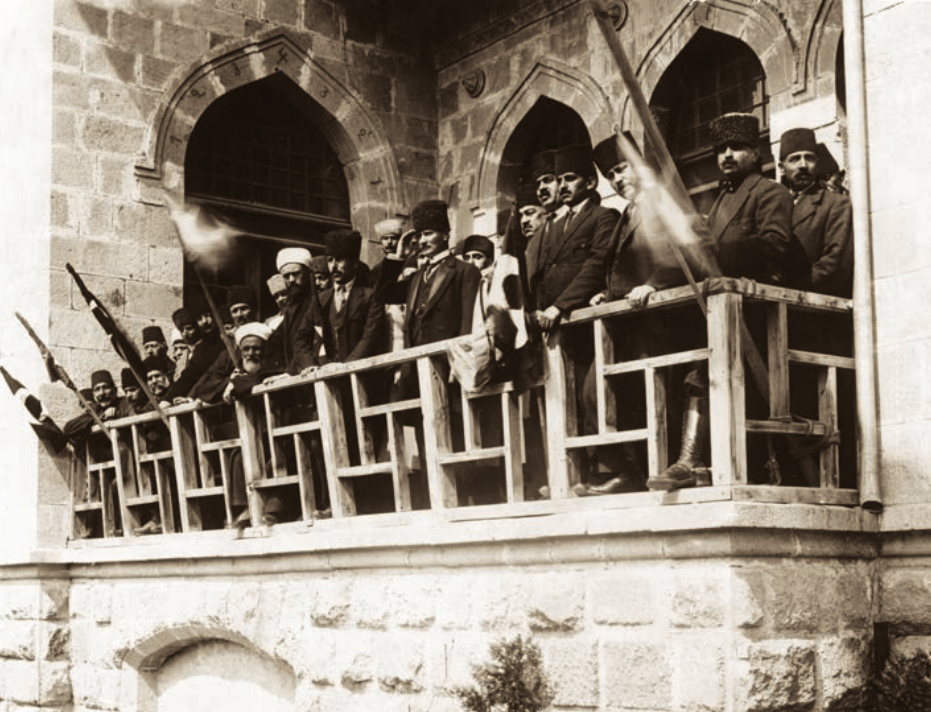
Mustafa Kemal and the Cabinet of the Executive Ministers salute people from the Grand National Assembly balcony, 28 May 1922

The provisional government was a parliamentary republic where the unicameral parliament, the Grand National Assembly, practiced both executive and legislative powers. As the main purpose of the government was to salvage the Ottoman Empire, and they in reality still recognized the Sultan, despite the capital was under occupation, there was no designated head of state position.

=== Executive branch ===
Two days after the proclamation of the Grand National Assembly, the Temporary Executive Council (Turkish: Muvakkat İcra Encümeni) was established under Mustafa Kemal's leadership to handle transition matters until the composition of an organized government. The council was disbanded by Law No. 3 following the first election on 3 May 1920.

The executive branch was a combination of military and civilian administrations. For instance, both the National Defense and the Chief of Staff were designated as ministries. The Cabinet of the Executive Ministers was composed of eleven ministries, as follows:

Title	Title in Ottoman Turkish (romanized)	Description
Sharia and Foundations	Şer'iye ve Evkaf	
Health and Social Welfare	Sıhhiye ve Muavenet-i İçtimaiye	The ministry was in charge of handling nationwide cooperation between military, civilian, and local health centers. It operated two hospital trains during the Greek Summer Offensive and established more than 20 stational and mobile hospitals. After the Constantinople government ban on vaccines and medical equipment supplies to Anatolia, the ministry focused on vaccine production and combating diseases.
Economy	İktisat	
Education	Maarif	At the time of the proclamation of the Ankara Government, most schools were underfunded and the already few existing teachers were resigning to seek public service jobs. The First Education Congress (Turkish: Birinci Maarif Kongresi) held in 1921 adjusted the national order in education: Elementary education was decreased from 6 to 4 years; many high schools were converted to vocational schools; the Copyright and Translation Council was founded to safeguard national heritage and commence first studies on the Alphabet Revolution. As there was no university in Anatolia, some professors from Constantinople voluntarily taught at high schools, and the ministry offered bachelor's degrees. Schools of foreign origin were also forced into audit by the central government.
Judiciary	Adliye	
Finance and Customs	Maliye ve Rüsumat	
Public Works	Nafia	
Interior	Dahiliye	Provincial administration; Law enforcement (Emniyet-i Umumiye); Postal and telegraph service (PTT)
National Defense	Müdafaa-ı Milliye	Internal security forces (Umum Jandarma Kumandanlığı)
Foreign Affairs	Hariciye	
Chief of Staff	Erkân-ı Harbiye	

=== Administrative divisions ===
Even though the Constitution of 1921 had emphasized decentralization through expanding local administrators' powers, it was a unitary state. The administrative order was composed of vilayets, integrated livas, independent livas, and kazas.

Shortly after the Armistice of Mundros, there were 15 vilayets, 35 integrated livas, 17 independent livas, and 392 kazas. Vilayets had autonomy to some extent through local councils (Turkish: vilâyet şurası) that were elected by the people and were allowed to amend and execute local laws, as long as they were compliant with the laws released by the central government. Vilayets had governors appointed by the Grand National Assembly for the representation and audit of vilayets, while kaymakams were responsible for lower divisions.

== The governments ==
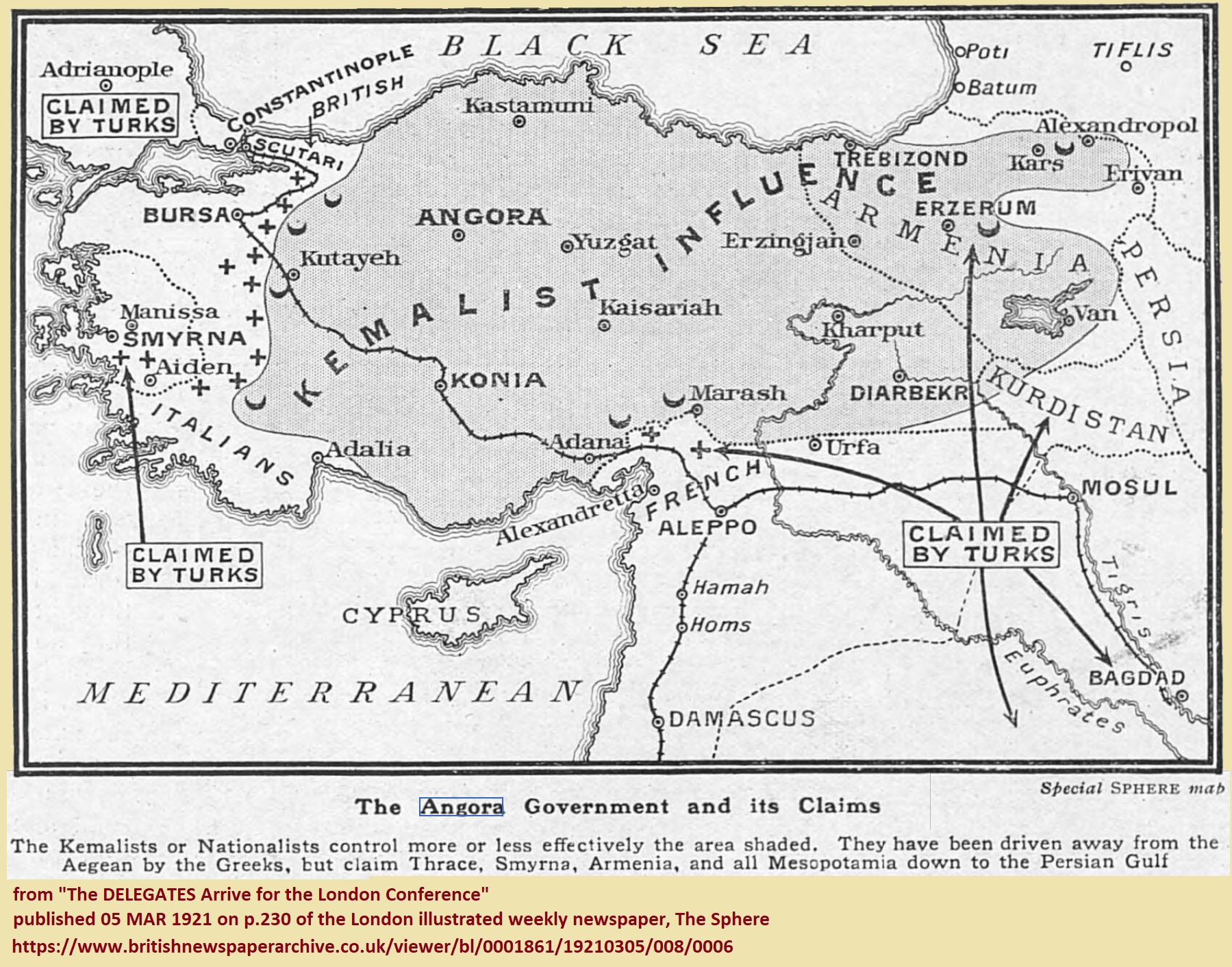
The map published by The Sphere on 1–5 March 1921: The Angora Government and its Claims The Kemalists or Nationalists control more or less effectively the area shaded. They have been driven away from the Aegean by the Greeks, but claim Thrace, Smyrna, Armenia, and all Mesopotamia down to the Persian Gulf

The governments prior to the Republic were used to be called "Executive ministers of Turkey." They were:

- 1st cabinet of the Executive Ministers of Turkey
- 2nd cabinet of the Executive Ministers of Turkey
- 3rd cabinet of the Executive Ministers of Turkey
- 4th cabinet of the Executive Ministers of Turkey
- 5th cabinet of the Executive Ministers of Turkey

== See also ==
- Turkish National Movement
- Armistice of Mudanya
- Turkish War of Independence
  - Greco-Turkish War (1919-1922)
- Abolition of the Ottoman sultanate
- Occupation of Istanbul
- Kuva-yi Milliye
