= Kuva-yi Inzibatiye =

1920 Ottoman anti-Kemalist army

Kuvâ-i İnzibâtiyye
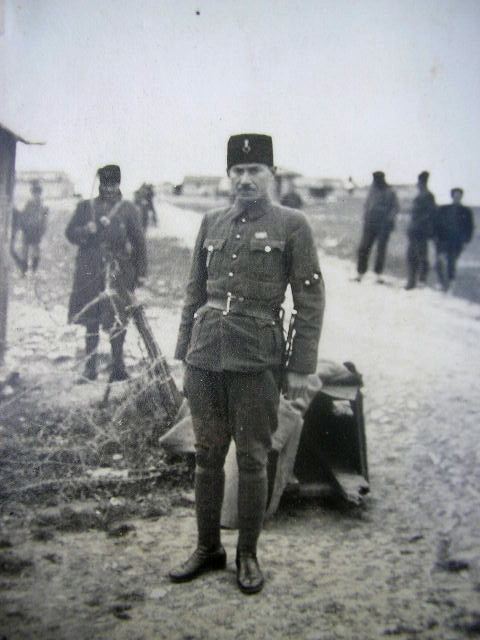
- Soldiers of the Caliphate Army
- Active: April 18, 1920 – June 25, 1920
- Country: Ottoman Empire
- Allegiance: Caliph Mehmed VI
- Type: Field Army
- Size: 7,000 (at peak)
- Nickname: Caliphate Army
- Engagements: Turkish War of Independence: Greek Summer Offensive

Commanders
- Notable commanders: Süleyman Şefik Pasha; Anzavur Ahmed Bey

The Kuvâ-yi İnzibâtiye (Ottoman Turkish: قوای انضباطیه, lit. 'Forces of Order'; Turkish: Hilafet Ordusu, lit. 'Caliphate Army') was an army established on 18 April 1920 by the imperial government of the Ottoman Empire in order to fight against the Turkish National Movement during the Turkish War of Independence in the aftermath of World War I, participating most notably in the Greek Summer Offensive on the side of the Greek Army. It was commanded by Süleyman Şefik Pasha.

== Establishment of the Kuva-yi Inzibatiye ==
Mehmed VI, realizing he could no longer count on the title "Sultan" alone to influence the Turkish people, considered it necessary to use the spiritual title of "Caliph" for the leader of the army - thus depicting Nationalists not only as the enemies of the Sultanate but also as the enemies of God. Under British pressure, the Disciplinary Force, also known as the Army of the Caliphate, was established by Damat Ferid Pasha to link up with the Circassian warlord Ahmed Anzavur and crush the nationalists. Sultan Mehmed VI charged his minister of war, Şevket Süleyman Paşa to command the force.

Supported by the British, the Sultan began a propaganda war throughout the country. Relayed by imams, he urged the Turks to take up arms against the Nationalists of General Mustafa Kemal, presented as the enemies of God.

Despite its name, European observers mocked the lack of discipline of the force, especially those among its general staff. Low enthusiasm in Istanbul's mission meant the Disciplinary Force marched off just half a division strong. Many of soldiers even joined the National Forces after being routed by Ali Fuad's men in İzmit, and the force was disbanded after some three-month existence. All the Disciplinary Force gave the Istanbul government was a financial crisis due to the army's expenses.

== Dissolution ==
The defeat of the Army of the Caliphate, a sign of the end of the influence of the Ottoman Sultan in Turkey, ended the civil war and heralded the beginning of the War of Independence against the occupying nations, which culminated in the victory of the Nationalists and the dissolution of the Ottoman Empire.

== See also ==
- Kuva-yi Milliye
