= Government of the late Ottoman Empire =

Ottoman Empire's government, 1876–1920

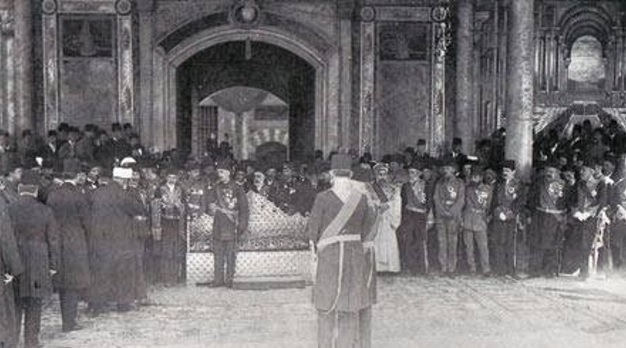
The sword girding of Mehmed VI.

Starting in the 19th century the Ottoman Empire's governing structure slowly transitioned and standardized itself into a Western style system of government, sometimes known as the Imperial Government. Mahmud II (r. 1808–1839) initiated this process following the disbandment and massacre of the Janissary corps, at this point a conservative bureaucratic elite, in the Auspicious Incident of 1826. A long period of reform known as the Tanzimat period started, which yielded much needed reform to the government and social contract with the multicultural citizens of the empire.

In the height of the Tanzimat period in 1876, Abdul Hamid II (r. 1876–1909) turned the Empire into a constitutional monarchy by promulgating the Empire's first Constitution, which established the short First Constitutional Era and also featured elections for a parliament. Defeat in the 1877–1878 War with Russia and dissatisfaction with Abdul Hamid led to the "temporary" suspension of the constitution and the parliament, resulting in a modern despotism/autocracy of Abdul Hamid, during which internal reform continued. The Young Turk Revolution in 1908 started the longer lasting Second Constitutional Era and forced Abdul Hamid to reinstate the constitution, recall the parliament, and hold elections again which this time which featured political parties. However, by 1913 the Ottoman Empire was a dictatorship of the Committee of Union and Progress (CUP), led by the Three Pashas (Talat Pasha, Enver Pasha, and Cemal Pasha). This dictatorship capitalized on the developed bureaucracy created through a century of reform and centralization by undertaking genocide against Christian minorities. The CUP also undertook many reforms relating to social structure, religion, and education, which would be continued and more far reaching under Mustafa Kemal Atatürk's regime. The Union and Progress dictatorship lasted until the end of World War I, which led to the Empire's collapse and subsequent abolition by Turkish nationalist forces led by Atatürk.

During this time period the various Viziers' responsibilities became equivalent to European style ministries, while the Grand Vizier received de jure equivalent powers to Prime ministers. In 1864, provincial reform was undertaken by standardizing administrative divisions into vilayets, with a governor assigned to each vilayet. Law was codified during the Late Ottoman Empire, with various systems given legitimacy: including Sharia, secular law, Code Napoleon, and various other laws derived from the millets.

== Constitution ==
Hoping that a constitution would please minorities in the Ottoman Empire and foreign powers, the Young Ottomans placed Abdul Hamid II on the throne. Initially thought to be a reformer, Abdul Hamid did promulgate the Constitution in 1876, and established a parliament. However, Russia invaded the Ottoman Empire the next year. Parliament's criticism of the monarch over incompetence in the war resulted in Abdul Hamid suspending the constitution and parliament in 1878, thus ending the First Constitutional Era. For three decades Abdul Hamid ruled the Empire without checks on his power as an autocrat. The 1908 Young Turk Revolution forced Abdul Hamid to reinstate the Constitution and recall parliament, initiating the Second Constitutional Era, which lasted until the Empire's end in 1922. The Constitution was briefly suspended during the following year after the 31 March Incident, when reactionaries rose up in Constantinople and forced the parliament to accept their demands. However, the uprising was crushed by the Action Army, which restored the constitution and the status quo ante. In addition to Abdul Hamid's deposition, the Constitution was also modified to strengthen the powers of the lower house: the Chamber of Deputies. The Constitution was de facto suspended following the takeover by the Committee of Union and Progress (CUP) dictatorship in 1913.

== Parliament and elections ==
The Ottoman Empire was a bicameral system, with a lower house, the popularly elected Chamber of Deputies, and an upper house, the Senate, whose members were appointed by the Sultan. Collectively, both chambers were known as the General Assembly. After the 31 March Incident in 1909, the constitution was amended to delegate the popularly elected lower house: the Chamber of Deputies, more powers over the Senate and the Monarchy.

All registered males above the age of 25 were allowed to vote in two-stage elections, where they first voted for a representative who would go on to vote for a deputy. The Ottoman Empire's first election was held in 1876, and its second in 1877, both of which lacked political parties. With the end of the First Constitutional Era came 34 years of direct rule by Yıldız Palace.

The elections held following the 1908 revolution were the first elections in Ottoman and Turkish history to feature political parties. The two major parties during the Second Constitutional Era were the Union and Progress Party (the CUP's parliamentary group) and the Freedom and Accord Party (as well as its predecessor: the Liberty Party). Though both were ideologically Young Turks parties, the Unionists desired a centralized Turkish-dominated Ottoman state, while the Itilafists desired decentralization and federalization. In addition, many ethnic political parties also existed, but most were banned after the passage of a law banning ethnic parties. Some ethnic parties like the Dashnaktsutyun (Armenian Revolutionary Federation) held a strong alliance with the CUP and continued to participate in Ottoman politics until 1915. Most governments between 1908 and 1918 were formed by the CUP.

== Central government ==
=== The House of Osman ===
How the monarchy exercised its power in the Empire's twilight days depended on the context. Sultan Abdul Hamid II ruled as an autocrat for most of his reign. Sultan Mehmed V served to be a committed constitutional monarch, and rarely if ever asserted his royal authority (even though after 1913 the ruling party ceased to respect the Constitution of the Ottoman Empire). His successor, Sultan Mehmed VI proved to be more assertive as a monarch. Under the Constitution, the Ottoman Sultan was the head of state and possessed strong royal powers, and appointed their head of government the Grand Vizier (who possessed prime ministerial powers) to form a cabinet and government in their name.

=== Sublime Porte ===
The Sublime Porte is a synecdoche to refer to the Ottoman government, a complex of buildings where the Grand Vizier and his cabinet was based. The Minister of War and Navy used to be picked by the Sultan instead of the Grand Vizier. However, in the early months of the Second Constitutional Era, Abdul Hamid, under pressure by the CUP was stripped of this privilege, and all cabinets seats were chosen by the Grand Vizier in 1908. During Mehmed Talaat Pasha's premiership, the office of Sheykh-ul-Islam was detached from the cabinet.

== Administrative divisions ==
=== Millets ===
As a goal of the Tanzimat reforms was standardization and centralization, the millets of the empire lost much of their autonomy. However, during the 19th century, many of the Christian Millets were quick to import Western systems of governance and political participation in their societies. The Armenian millet promulgated a constitution and opened the Armenian National Assembly 14 years before the Ottoman government.

== See also ==
- Government of Turkey
