= Amasya Protocol =

1919 agreement between Ottomans and Turkish revolutionaries

Amasya Protocol (Amasya Görüşmeleri) was a memorandum of understanding signed on 22 October 1919 in Amasya, Turkey between the Ottoman imperial government in Istanbul and the Turkish revolutionaries (the Turkish National Movement) aimed at seeking ways to preserve national independence and unity through joint efforts. The Amasya Protocol was the first official contact between Ottoman imperial government and the Turkish National Movement, and therefore, increased the credibility of the Nationalist Movement among the nation and gave rise to the support and participation from the people. It also signified a recognition by the Ottoman government of the rising Turkish revolutionary forces in Anatolia.

Mustafa Kemal Atatürk, Rauf Orbay and Bekir Sami Kunduh on the one side, in their title of Delegation of Representatives (Heyeti Temsiliye) as attributed by the Sivas Congress, and the Ottoman Minister of Marine (later grand vizier himself) Hulusi Salih Pasha, who had come to Amasya to represent the short-lived Ottoman government of Ali Rıza Pasha on the other side, all signed the protocol just after the Sivas Congress in the same city of the Amasya Circular.

The protocol agreed that new elections would be held that year for the Chamber of Deputies (the popularly elected lower house of the Ottoman parliament), and the Chamber would convene outside Istanbul (at the time occupied by the Allies), consider passing the resolutions of the Sivas Congress and describes the new country as "The lands which Kurds and Turks inhabit" Although it did not convene outside Istanbul as promised, the new Chamber convened on 12 January 1920 and passed the Misak-ı Millî (National Pact) agreed to at the Sivas and Erzurum Congresses, after which the Allies, in an effort to stamp out the nascent Turkish National Movement, forced it to dissolve and declared martial law in Istanbul.

Atatürk gives detailed information about the "Amasya Protocol" signed with Salih Pasha on behalf of the Delegation of Representatives in the Nutuk.

"Gentlemen, you will recall that it was decided to meet Salih Pasha, the Minister of Navy, in Amasya. There was the possibility of discussing with the Minister Pasha the foreign policy of the government, the internal administration and the future of the army. For this purpose, I think it would have been very useful to know the thoughts and opinions of the corps commanders beforehand.

In his cipher telegram dated 14 October 1919, Atatürk requested the opinions of the corps commanders on these three points.

Salih Pasha left Istanbul on 15 October. We set out from Sivas on 16 October. On 18 October, we arrived in Amasya. Salih Pasha had been instructed by the national organisations to hold brilliant welcoming ceremonies at the ports he would call at and to say "welcome" on our behalf. We, too, welcomed him in Amasya with great demonstrations. Our negotiations with Salih Pasha in Amasya, which began on 20 October, ended on 22 October. At the end of three days of negotiations, five protocols were drawn up, two in number. Of these five protocols, we signed three of them, Salih Pasha signed the ones that remained with Salih Pasha, and Salih Pasha signed the ones that remained with us. Two protocols were considered confidential and were not signed.

== Second protocol ==
In this meeting, after a preliminary discussion showing the details of the mutual assurances of the parties concerning the caliphate and the sultanate, the discussion of the articles in the declaration of the Sivas Congress dated 11 September 1919 began:

- It was deemed appropriate to prevent the confusion which was being made under the pretence of aiming at the realisation of Kurdish independence. It was mentioned that there was an intention to separate Cilicia, from Turkey in order to create a buffer state between Arabia and Turkey. It was generally accepted that no separation of these lands would be accepted by the sides by any means, and that the province of Aydın was an indivisible part of the Misak-ı Millî.

== See also ==
- Amasya Circular
- Misak-ı Millî
- Sivas Congress
- Erzurum Congress
- Ankara Government
