= War of Independence Museum =

Turkey museum

Coordinates: 39.941956°N 32.854002°E

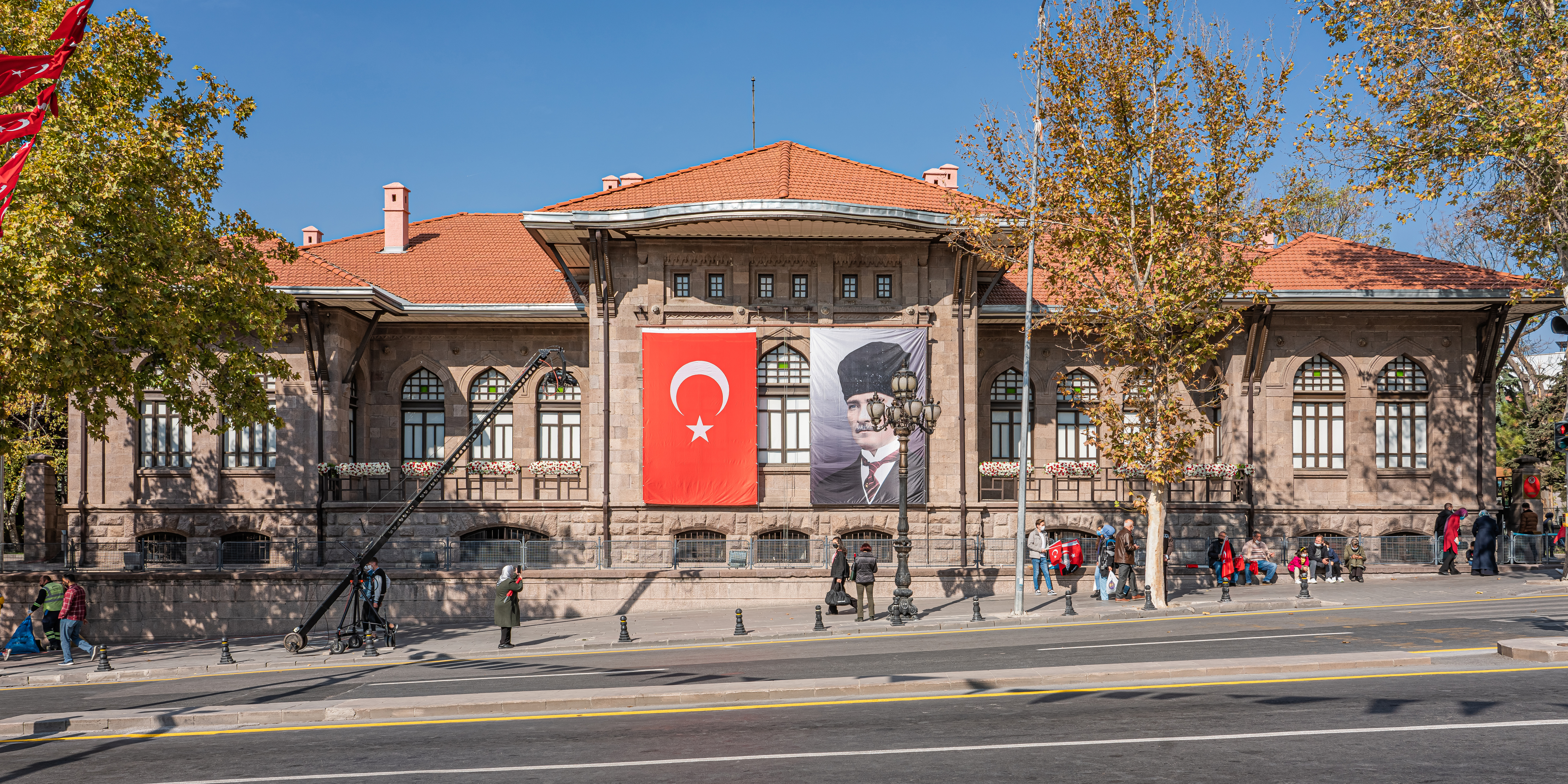
- Established: April 23, 1961
- Location: 14/22 Cumhuriyet Bulvarι, Ulus, Ankara, Turkey
- Website: Official website

The War of Independence Museum (Kurtuluş Savaşı Müzesi), housed in the first Turkish Grand National Assembly building in the Ulus district of Ankara, Turkey, displays important photographs, documents and furniture from the Turkish War of Independence.

== History ==
=== Construction ===
The one-storey andesite (Ankara stone) building was designed by architect Salim Bey, at the request of Enver Pasha, as the headquarters of the Committee of Union and Progress. Construction began in 1915, under the supervision of Turkish Army Corps architect Hasip Bey. Before the building was finished, the Turkish Grand National Assembly decided use it, and its completion had to be hurried for the inaugural meeting.

=== Grand Opening ===
Thousands gathered in Ulus Square for the opening of the assembly on April 23, 1920, and Sinop representative Serif Bey, who as the oldest member had been chosen as President of the Assembly, made the first speech.

Honourable members of the Assembly, it is well known that the Capitol of Caliphate and the Government has been occupied in temporary terms by the enemy forces and our independence has been restricted in every respect. Submission to these conditions means acceptance of captivity imposed by the foreign powers. However, eternally free and an independent nation of ours, determined to exist in absolute independence, rejected this captivity with final determination and by gathering its representatives, brought into being this Grand Assembly of ours. In the name of the speaker of the Grand Assembly and by the help of God, I declare the principals of absolute independence and self determination of the nation to the whole world and open the National Assembly.

Ankara representative Mustafa Kemal followed him.

As you all know, our Grand Assembly is constituted by the re-elected honourable members charged with extraordinary powers and honourable members fleeing from the Government Capital which was attacked and occupied. The constitution of this Grand Assembly was made possible only by the new election system, which included those who were able to flee from the capital and join us. Presently your Assembly is meeting with all legalities.

Mustafa Kemal was elected President of the Assembly at the second session of the Assembly held the following day and concluded his acceptance speech by stating, “There is no power above this Grand Assembly anymore...”

=== Independence War ===
The building continued to serve as the headquarters of the Turkish Grand National Assembly throughout the War of Independence and many significant decisions were made here;

- January 20, 1921: Approval of the First Turkish Constitution
- March 12, 1921: Approval of the Turkish National Anthem
- November 1, 1922: Abolition of the Ottoman Sultanate
- July 24, 1923: Approval of Treaty of Lausanne
- October 13, 1923: Establishment of Ankara as the Capital City of the Turkish Republic
- October 29, 1923: Declaration of Republic and the election of Mustafa Kemal as first president

Atatürk stated, “The Grand National Assembly is the living symbol of the Turkish Nation's century’s old search for self determination and consciousness...”

The building continued to house the assembly until October 15, 1924.

=== Later use ===
The building served as the headquarters of the Republican People's Party and then as the School of Law before being turned over to the Turkish Ministry of Education in 1952. Work started in 1957 to convert the building into a museum and it was opened to the public as the Turkish Grand National Assembly Museum on April 23, 1961.

The building was further restored, as part of celebrations of the 100th anniversary of the birth of President Atatürk, by the Antiquities and Museums General Directorate of the Turkish Ministry of Culture and Tourism, and was reopened as the Independence War Museum on April 23, 1981.

== Museum ==
The building remains open to the public, having recently undergone further renovation, as the Independence War Museum with a number of rooms currently open to view.

=== Corridor ===
The main corridor contains oil paintings depicting the events of the years from 1918 to 1923, and the work of the assembly in its first and the second terms.

=== Masjid (prayer room) ===
The masjid was used by the Assembly as a prayer room and has prayer rugs and Koran Rahle on display.

=== Assembly president’s room ===
The original appearance and arrangement of Mustafa Kemal's has been preserved. The presidential seal, which is on display in this room, is described as the most important and distinguished piece of the museum's collection.

=== Chambers of the ruling council ===
The cabinet and presidential board rooms have also been preserved. The President's pulpit and the cabinet table and chairs used at the Sivas Congress are on display alongside photographs of the members of the first cabinet of Turkey after the declaration of the Republic.

=== Committee room ===
The committee room contains an exhibition of documents, photographs and artefacts relating to the Armistice of Mudros, Mustafa Kemal's arrival in Samsun, the Amasya Circular, the Sivas and Erzurum Congresses, and the Misak-ı Millî. The seal used at the Erzurum Congress is also on display.

=== Lobby (break room) ===
The Assembly Lobby contains an exhibition of documents, photographs and artefacts relating to the opening of the assembly, the terms of Sèvres and Lausanne Agreements, and First and Second Battles of İnönü. There is also an oil painting of Mustafa Kemal's arrival in Ankara, weapons and the telephone switchboard used during the Independence War and a silver cutlery set presented to Kâzım Karabekir at the Treaty of Alexandropol ceremony.

=== Legislative committee room ===
The legislative committee room contains displays of documents, photographs and artefacts relating to the Great Offensive, an oil painting depicting Mustafa Kemal on the balcony of the assembly building, Independence War medals and a rug symbolizing the National Pact.

=== Grand assembly hall ===
The original appearance and arrangement of the assembly hall has been preserved with the following items: the president's and the chair council's pulpit in the middle surmounted by an Arabic script inscription reading, “Sovereignty belongs to the Nation”; benches from the Ankara Teachers’ Schools in the pulpit; side rows for the representatives; mezzanines on the right and left for the diplomatic corps and the audience, respectively, with space underneath for press and kerosene lamps and stoves from neighbouring coffee houses.

=== Administration room ===
The administration rooms contains identity cards, Mauser rifles and personal artefacts that belonged to Atatürk and members of the Assembly, or were given to the members by the Turkish Grand National Assembly and Independence War commanders. There is also a flag with the signature of Recep Peker hoisted onto the Grand National Assembly on 23 April 1920.

=== Basement ===
The basement is currently used for temporary exhibitions and storage as well as housing the museum's photographic laboratory.
