= Havza Atatürk's House Museum =

House museum in Turkey

- Havza Atatürk Evi
- Established: 25 May 2002; 24 years ago
- Location: Havza, Samsun Province, Turkey
- Coordinates: 40.970637°N 35.658778°E
- Type: Historic house

Havza Atatürk's House Museum (Turkish: Havza Atatürk Evi) is a historical building located in the Havza district of Samsun Province, which was used by Mustafa Kemal Atatürk in 1919, in the beginning of the Turkish War of Independence. In 2002, it was opened as a museum.

== Background ==
The historical importance of the building, at that time "Mesudiye Hotel", comes from the fact that Mustafa Kemal Pasha used the building as the army headquarters during his duty as the Inspector of the Ninth Ottoman Army between 25 May and 13 June 1919. It is considered the first headquarters of the War of Independence.

=== Events before ===
After being defeated by the Allied Powers in the World War I, the Ottoman Empire, as part of the Central Powers, signed Armistice of Mudros with Britain on 30 October 1918. The capital Istanbul and some important cities and regions of Anatolia were occupied by the British, French, Italian and Greek troops. The British warned the Ottoman government in Istanbul that in case of any hostilities against the occupation troops or the non-Muslim population, they would seize the location according to the 7th clause of the armistice. The Ottoman government decided to send military inspectors to regions in question to avoid such a situation. Sultan Mehmed VI Vahideddin (r. 1918–1922) approved the appointment by the government on 30 April 1919 for the deployment of Mustafa Kemal Pasha as Inspector of the Ninth Ottoman Army responsible for the Eastern Turkey region. The appointment came into force after its publication in the official gazette Takvim-i Vekayi on 5 May 1919.

Following completing preparations, Mustafa Kemal Pasha, his aide-de-camp, and some military personnel headed for Samsun via the Black Sea on the freighter SS Bandırma leaving Istanbul on 16 May 1919. After three days, Mustafa Kemal Pasha and his entourage landed in Samsun on 19 May 1919, the day which later became the first day of the Turkish War of Independence. He stayed in the Mıntıka Palas Hotel until 25 May 1919. He and his entourage drove in three cars to Havza, 84 km (52 mi) south of Samasun, making a short stop underway in Kavak.

=== Havza days ===
Arrived in Havza, Mustafa Kemal Pasha quartered in Mesudiye Hotel, rented by the district governor for one month specially for him and his entourage. Two rooms on the first floor were reserved for the Pasha as a study room and bedroom. The rooms on the upper floor of the hotel were used by the entourage. The hotel served as the headquarters of the Ninth Ottoman Army Inspectorate.

The next day, the Pasha had talks with a delegation of seven people representing Havza. He explained the difficult and pathetic situation Havza was in. He stated that one should never fall into despair and that they should immediately establish an Association for Defence of National Rights (Turkish: Müdâfaa-i Hukuk Cemiyeti) to defend the homeland and that this should be announced to all surrounding provinces. Two days later, the association was founded by the district governor and the mayor. On 30 May, the residents of the town rallied under the leadership of the Pasha after the Friday prayer. This is considered the first rally of the National Struggle. It was noted that the Samsun and Havza could experience the same bad end as the occupation of İzmir which had occurred fifteen days prior on 15 May, and that it was necessary to arm to prevent this. During his time in Samsun and Havza, he carried out his work sending telegrams to the cities in the region of his responsibility and also to Istanbul. In the telegrams to Istanbul, he generally aimed to calm and distract the Sultan. In the telegram to the Istanbul government, he emphasized that no harm was done to non-Muslims. He added that the incidents were legitimate when the future and existence of the Turkish nation were threatened. Upon a query of the Ottoman Ministry of War regarding the rally, Mustafa Kemal Pasha responded on 3 June that he is unable to prevent and to stop the excitement and national demonstration of people, who has power and strength. On 6 June, a second rally was held in Havza, at which immediate arming was ordered by cleaning the firearms, if not available by axes or by firewood.

British occupation forces commander General Milne (1866–1948) gave an ultimatum to the Istanbul government regarding Mustafa Kemal Pasha. Thereupon, Minister of War Şevket Turgut Pasha (1857–1924) called Mustafa Kemal Pasha back to Istanbul. The activities of the Pasha by organizing local people to fight against the Greek gangs in the region and to liberate the entire country caught the attention of the British. Captain Hurst, and were reported to the British High Commissioner in Istanbul Admiral Gough-Calthorpe (1864–1937) and to the British Minister of Foreign Affairs Lord Curzon (1859–1925). The report also included that some officers of the Ottoman Army had quietly passed from Istanbul to Anatolia. Thereupon, British diplomats pressured the Bab-ı Âli to end Mustafa Kemal Pasha's activities in Havza and to neutralize him, and had him called back. In addition, the British Attaché in Istanbul instructed Hurst to follow up on Mustafa Kemal Pasha's activities. Hurst went to Havza and inspected the district. There, he first met with the Greeks and then with Mustafa Kemal Pasha. During this meeting,the Pasha told Hurst that the hot springs in Havza were good for his body, and that he would stay in Havza for a while longer and then go to Amasya and further south. Hurst reported the situation there to the British diplomats via telegrams.

On 10 June, Mustafa Kemal Pasha, who did not heed the call to return to Istanbul, sent a circular to the civil and military authorities in the region, declared that he would work until the end for the national independence. His activities in Havza created a national consciousness in the Turkish nation and organized public rallies against the occupations. In his response to the Istanbul government on 12 June, he would support the national struggle until the end, not return to Istanbul. If necessary, he would resign from his post and join the people to carry out the national struggle.

On 13 June, Mustafa Kemal Pasha left Havza for Amasya.

=== Aftermath ===
Mustafa Kemal Pasha resigned from the military, led the national struggle, established a government in Ankara on 23 April 1920, fought against the Greek occupation defeating them on 30 August 1922, proclamated the Republic on 29 October 1923 and gave an end to the Ottoman Empire.

Elected the first President of Turkey (in office 1923–1938), he revisited Havza three times, on 24 September 1924, on 18 September 1928 and finally on 22 November 1930.

== Historic house museum ==
Located on Atatürk Street 15 in the Medrese Neighborhood of Havza, the two-story, brick building is covered with a hipped roof. It has nine rooms, four on the first floor and five on the second floor. The floor and ceiling of the building are made of wood.

The Mesudiye Hotel was purchased from its owner Hurdazlı İsa Efendi at a cost of 4,500 Lira by the municipality in 1922. It was used as a service building for more than sixty years. The building was registered as an immovable cultural asset by the High Council of Antiquities and Monuments on 12 July 1980. In 1984, the municipality left the building preserving the study room of Mustafa Kemal Pasha as open to public visitors. It was transferred to the Provincial Infrastructure Administration in 1993, and in 1994 the Ministry of Culture and Tourism took over the building and donated it to the District Government. In 2002, it was restored and turned into the Atatürk's House Museum

The tudy room of Mustafa Kemal Pasha was preserved as the "Gazi Room" -after the victory at the Battle of the Sakarya, he was granted the honorific title Ghazi by the Grand National Assembly in Ankara on 19 September 1921-. In the museum, the Havza ("First Spark") room, which had an important place in the beginning of the War of Independence, and the rooms named after the cities of Amasya (after Amasya Circular on 22 June 1919), Erzurum (after Erzurum Congress on 23 July–4 August 1919), Sivas (after Sivas Congress on 4–11 September 1919) and Ankara (as the new capital) are noteworthy. In these rooms, information about the history of the cities as well as correspondence from Mustafa Kemal Pasha are exhibited. The museum displays the telegraph manuscript, with which the Havza Circular was sent, the first presidential seal of the Republic of Turkey, photographs of important individuals and officers, who organized the resistance in Havza, and some photographs documenting the attacks and massacres of Greek gangs. The First Spark Room contains the Havza Circular and a handwritten list of twelve questions prepared by Mustafa Kemal Pasha to ask the district governor Fahri Bey in order to obtain information about Havza. Items specific to the years of national struggle, books about the years of national struggle and some weapons used in the national struggle are among the notable works of the museum. Havza Atatürk's House Museum, which contains a total of 79 ethnographic works, has an important place compared to other Atatürk house museums in terms of symbolizing the first spark of the War of Independence.

The museum is open every day between 9 and 17 hours in winter and from 9 to 18 in summer months.
