= Nutuk =

1927 speech by Mustafa Kemal Atatürk

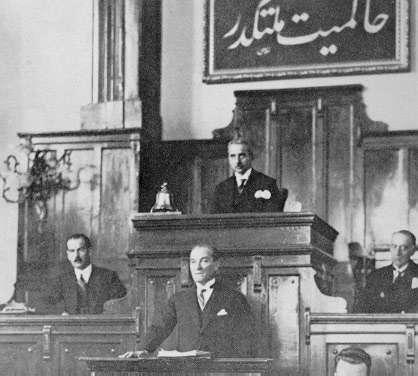
- Mustafa Kemal Atatürk presenting the Nutuk at the second congress of the Republican People's Party in 1927. The حاكميت ملتكدر Hâkimiyet Milletindir ("Sovereignty Belongs to the Nation").
- Date: 15–20 October 1927
- Duration: 36 hours 33 minutes
- Venue: Grand National Assembly’s General Assembly Hall, Ankara
- Type: Political speech
- Theme: Turkish War of Independence; founding of the Republic of Turkey
- Speaker: Mustafa Kemal Atatürk
- Language: Ottoman Turkish
- Occasion: Second congress of the Republican People's Party (CHP)

Nutuk (Ottoman Turkish: نطق, lit. "The Speech") is a historic speech delivered by Ghazi Mustafa Kemal Atatürk from 15 to 20 October 1927, at the second congress of the Republican People's Party (CHP) in Ankara. The speech details the events between the beginning of the Turkish War of Independence on 19 May 1919 and the foundation of the Republic of Turkey in 1923. Spanning six days, the speech took a total of 36 hours and 33 minutes to be read by Atatürk.

The text is considered a foundational document of Kemalism and the official historiography of the Turkish Republic's establishment. In it, Atatürk presents his perspective on the collapse of the Ottoman Empire and the political, social, and military struggles that led to the creation of a new nation-state. It established a definitive narrative of the national struggle, solidified Atatürk's position as its leader, and served as a political and ideological guide for the new republic.

While revered in Turkey as a primary source for the nation's founding, Nutuk has also been the subject of critical historical analysis for its role in constructing a singular national narrative, its defamation or neglection of other leaders, its hyperbole and exaggeration of Atatürk's own role, its silencing of alternative perspectives, and its omission of certain events, most notably the Armenian genocide.

== Background and writing process ==
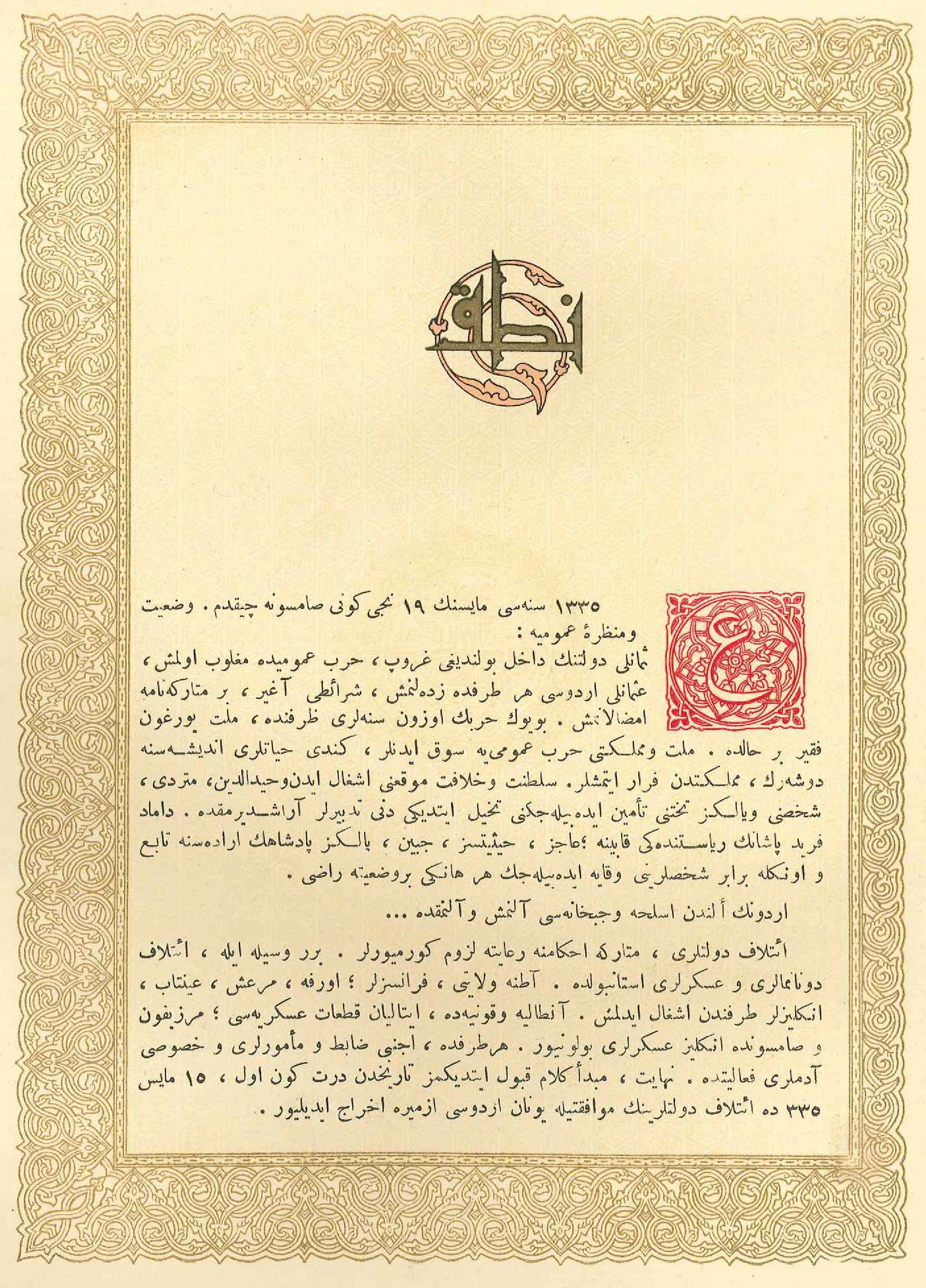
Page from an Ottoman Turkish transcript of Nutuk.

Atatürk began preparing the text for Nutuk in Ankara in early 1927. The writing process was intensive, with Atatürk reportedly working for up to 35–40 hours without a break. According to his valet, Cemal Granda, he once dictated the speech for 48 hours continuously. A significant portion of the work was done at the Çankaya Mansion, with final edits completed at Dolmabahçe Palace in Istanbul.

While Atatürk was the principal author, he consulted with friends and colleagues, reading drafts to them and incorporating their feedback. He meticulously gathered and organized official documents, telegrams, letters, and reports from the 1919–1927 period to support his narrative. The original manuscript of the speech was later entrusted to the General Staff's Harp Tarihi Dairesi (War History Department).

Atatürk's stated purpose was to provide a first-hand historical account of the Turkish nation's struggle for future generations. However, the speech also served several other functions: to provide a political accounting to the nation and his party, to settle scores with his political opponents, and to establish a foundational ideology for the future of the Republic.

== Delivery ==
Atatürk delivered the Nutuk from 15 to 20 October 1927, during the Second Grand Congress of the Republican People's Party, held in the Grand National Assembly's General Assembly Hall in Ankara. The audience included CHP delegates, government officials, high-ranking military officers, foreign diplomats, and members of the press.

The speech was delivered over six days, with Atatürk speaking for several hours each day, totaling 36 hours and 33 minutes. He began by stating his intention to give an account of the events of the preceding years:

Gentlemen, I feel it is my duty to give an account to our nation of our actions and deeds which have been continuing for years... I am of the opinion that the speech and statement which will touch upon a period of nine years full of events will be long. However, since the matter is a necessary duty, I hope you will excuse me.

The speech concluded on the evening of 20 October with his address to the Turkish youth. The conclusion was met with a lengthy standing ovation, and according to contemporary accounts, Atatürk himself was moved to tears. Following the speech, a motion by delegate Necip Asım Bey to formally thank Atatürk and approve the Nutuk was passed unanimously by the congress.

== Content and themes ==
The Nutuk is structured chronologically, covering the period from Atatürk's landing in Samsun on 19 May 1919 to the state of the Republic in 1927.

=== Part I: The National Struggle (1919–1920) ===
Atatürk begins by painting a bleak picture of the Ottoman Empire's state at the end of World War I, describing it as defeated, its army surrendered, and its people exhausted. He portrays the Sultan, Vahdeddin, and his government under Damat Ferit Pasha as degenerate, incompetent, and concerned only with their own survival.

Gentlemen, I landed at Samsun on the 19th May, 1919. This was the position at that time: The group of powers, of which the Ottoman Empire was one, had been defeated in the Great War. The Ottoman Army had surrendered in all directions and an armistice with harsh terms had been signed... The Entente Powers did not consider it necessary to respect the terms of the armistice. On various pretexts, their men-of-war and troops remained at İstanbul. The Vilayet of Adana was occupied by the French; Urfa, Maraş, and Antep by the English. In Antalya and Konya were Italians, while at Merzifon and Samsun there were English troops... At last, on 15 May... the Greek Army, with the consent of the Entente Powers, had landed at İzmir.

He outlines the three main proposals for salvation circulating at the time: demanding protection from Britain, accepting an American mandate, or allowing for regional resistance. He rejects all three, arguing that the foundations of the Ottoman Empire were shattered and that the only viable solution was the creation of a new, independent Turkish state based on national sovereignty.

In these circumstances, one resolution alone was possible, namely, to create a New Turkish State, the sovereignty and independence of which would be unreservedly recognised.

This section details the organization of the national movement, including the Amasya Circular, the Erzurum Congress, and the Sivas Congress, establishing the principles of the struggle.

=== Part II: The Grand National Assembly and the War of Independence (1920–1923) ===
This part covers the establishment of the Grand National Assembly (GNA) in Ankara on 23 April 1920, which Atatürk presents as the sole legitimate representative of the nation's will. He details the internal and external challenges faced by the new government, including internal rebellions (which he attributes to the Istanbul government and foreign powers) and the military campaigns of the War of Independence on the Eastern, Southern, and Western fronts.

Key events covered include the major battles of the Greco-Turkish War, such as the First and Second Battles of İnönü, the Battle of Sakarya, and the Great Offensive. He explains his military strategy, including his famous directive at the Battle of Sakarya:

There is no line of defense, but a surface of defense. That surface is the entire homeland. Not an inch of the homeland can be abandoned until it is soaked with the blood of its citizens.

The section culminates with the military victory, the Armistice of Mudanya, and the beginning of the Lausanne peace negotiations. It also covers the abolition of the Sultanate on 1 November 1922, a pivotal moment he describes as the nation reclaiming its sovereignty by force.

=== Part III: The Republic and its reforms (1923–1927) ===
The final part of the speech focuses on the post-war period, beginning with the Lausanne Conference and the international recognition of Turkish sovereignty. Atatürk details the proclamation of the Republic on 29 October 1923, and the abolition of the Caliphate in March 1924. He justifies these radical reforms as necessary steps to create a modern, secular, and national state. The speech concludes with his Address to Turkish Youth, entrusting them with the duty of protecting the Republic's independence and integrity.

== Editions and translations ==
The copyright for Nutuk was donated by Atatürk to the Türk Tayyare Cemiyeti (Turkish Aeroplane Society).

- 1927: The first edition was published in the Ottoman Turkish alphabet in two volumes: the first contained the speech, and the second contained supporting documents. A limited luxury edition was also printed.
- 1934: The first edition in the new Latin-based Turkish alphabet was published by the Ministry of National Education in three volumes.
- 1938: A single-volume edition was published by the Ministry of Culture.
- 1963: The Turkish Language Association (TDK) published a version "simplified" into modern Turkish under the title Söylev.

The speech has been translated into numerous languages, including German (1928), French (1929), English (1929), and Russian (1929–34). Many publishing houses in Turkey and abroad continue to print editions of the work.

== Reception and historical significance ==
The Nutuk is widely regarded as one of the most important texts in the history of modern Turkey. It serves as the primary official source for the study of the Turkish War of Independence and the founding of the Republic.

=== Foundational role in the Republic ===
According to historian Hakan Uzun, Nutuk embodies the core values of the Turkish nation as envisioned by Atatürk, emphasizing national unity, sovereignty, and independence. It established the official state narrative, or Kemalist historiography, which framed the national struggle as a heroic epic led by Atatürk against foreign invaders and domestic traitors (the Ottoman dynasty and its collaborators). The speech became a central text in Turkish education and civic life, and its concepts of republicanism, democracy, and secularism were presented as the "most precious treasures" of the Turkish people.

=== Appraisals in scholarship and education ===
Academic work on political rhetoric regularly cites Nutuk as a classic case of nation-building discourse. Morin and Lee describe the text as “a paradigmatic example of constitutive nationalism” that helped articulate a modern Turkish identity in the immediate post-Ottoman period.

Linguists have also focused on its prose. Zeynep Korkmaz calls the language “measured and natural” for its time and regards the speech as a model of early-Republican Turkish. Historian Yusuf Akçura characterised it as “the founding narrative (kuruluş destanı) of the Republic”, emphasising both its historical content and literary form. Biographer Şevket Süreyya Aydemir argued that the work should be read “not merely as memoir but as a primary political document of lasting importance”.

In Turkish secondary-school history and civics courses Nutuk has been required or recommended reading since the 1930s, and abridged editions aimed at younger readers remain in print. Translations into French, German, English and Russian appeared between 1928 and 1934, giving the speech an early international readership and prompting comparative studies.

=== Critical analysis and controversies ===
While foundational, Nutuk has also been a subject of critical analysis for its subjective nature and its role in consolidating a single-party state.

Several key figures of the War of Independence who later became political opponents of Atatürk, such as Kâzım Karabekir, Rauf Orbay, and Halide Edib Adıvar, contested the narrative presented in Nutuk. They argued that the speech minimized their roles and contributions while exaggerating Atatürk's, and that it unfairly portrayed them as misguided or even treasonous. Halide Edib, for example, took issue with how her support for an American mandate was depicted, arguing it was a pragmatic consideration in a desperate time—a view she claimed Atatürk himself had not initially opposed.

Historians and sociologists have debated the speech’s canonical status and its omissions within Turkish national historiography. Sociologist Fatma Müge Göçek describes the speech as having been "adopted as the official Turkish national narrative and became sacralized by the state". She argues that laws protecting Atatürk's memory have made it difficult for Turkish historians to analyze the speech critically. Göçek points out that by beginning the national story in 1919, the text "remov[es] in the process the demise of the Armenians in 1915 through state violence to the realm of Republican prehistory".

Some scholars have highlighted the speech's role in justifying the establishment of a single-party autocracy. Historian Marc David Baer writes that the speech's themes include "silence, denial... general amnesia about past violence (unless presenting Turks as the real victims), identifying with the perpetrators, [and] never questioning the great prophetic and infallible leader (Atatürk)". British historian Perry Anderson noted the speech's monumental scale as a tool of autocratic rule, stating it "dwarfed any address by Khrushchev or Castro... a record in the annals of autocracy".

== See also ==
- Kemalist historiography
- Turkish History Thesis
