= Sivas Congress and Ethnography Museum =

Museum in Sivas, Turkey

- Sivas Kongre ve Etnoğrafya Müzesi
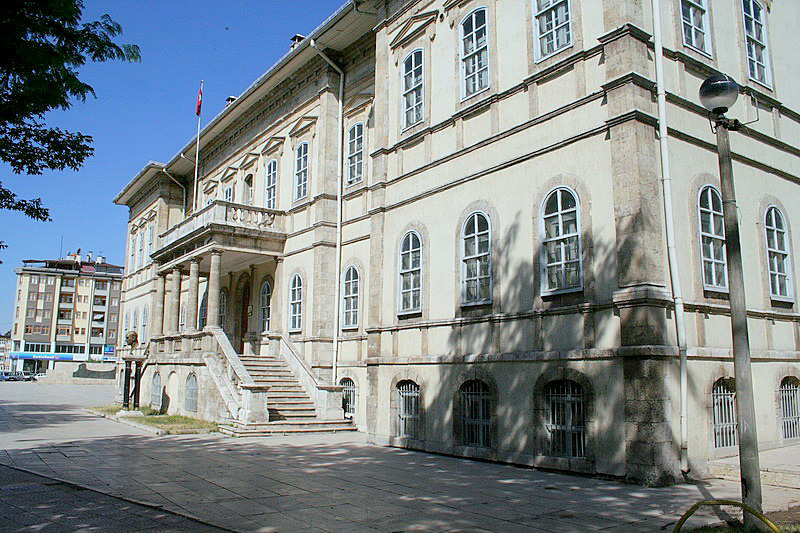
- Museum building

- Sivas Congress and Ethnography Museum
- Established: 1990; 36 years ago
- Location: İnönü Bulvarı, Sivas, Turkey
- Coordinates: 39°44′59″N 37°00′50″E
- Type: History, Ethnography
- Collections: Ottoman Empire, Turkey
- Owner: Ministry of Culture and Tourism

Sivas Congress and Ethnography Museum is a museum in Sivas, Turkey.

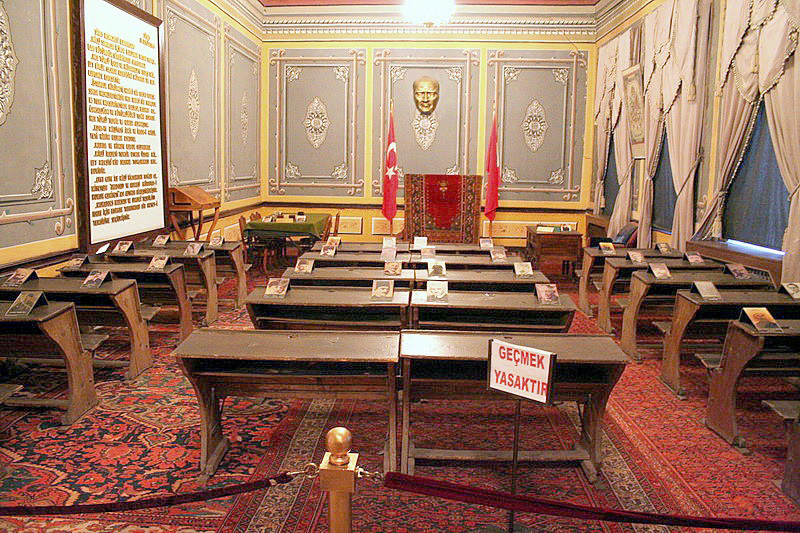
Meeting hall of the Sivas Congress (4–11 September 1919).

== Location ==
The museum building is on İnönü Boulevard in Sivas. Two medieval medreses (schools), Şifahiye Medrese and Buruciye Medrese, are to the east of the museum.

== History ==
The building was originally a high school. It was built in 1892 by Mehmet Mazlum Bey, the governor of Sivas. Between 4–12 September 1919, the building was used by Turkish nationalists as a center for preparation of the Turkish War of Independence (see Sivas Congress). After the congress, Mustafa Kemal Pasha (later Atatürk) and his friends stayed in this building until 18 December 1919, when they left for Ankara. Following their departure, the building returned to its former roll as a high school. In 1930, the building underwent a renovation. In 1984, upon the instruction of president Kenan Evren, the building was acquired by the Ministry of Culture. Following a restoration period, it was opened as the Museum of Congress in 1990.

== Description ==
The three-storey building is an example of Ottoman civil architecture of the 19th century. The laboratory, the photo room and the stock rooms are in the basement. The elevated ground floor is the ethnography section, and the upper floor is the Atatürk and Congress section. In the ethnography section, one room is reserved for weapons. Another room, named Hacı Beslen, houses ethnographic items like coins, calligraphy, and paintings, which were donated by Turan Türkeroğlu. In another room is a collection of Sivas rugs and a 12th-century wooden mimber (pulpit) from Divriği castle mosque. Another room named başoda ("headroom") represents the guest room of the wealthy Sivas citizens of the Ottoman times. In this room, items from the Divriği Ulu Mosque are also exhibited. Copper works, tekke (a type of Islam institution of the Ottoman times) articles and clothes are exhibited in other rooms.

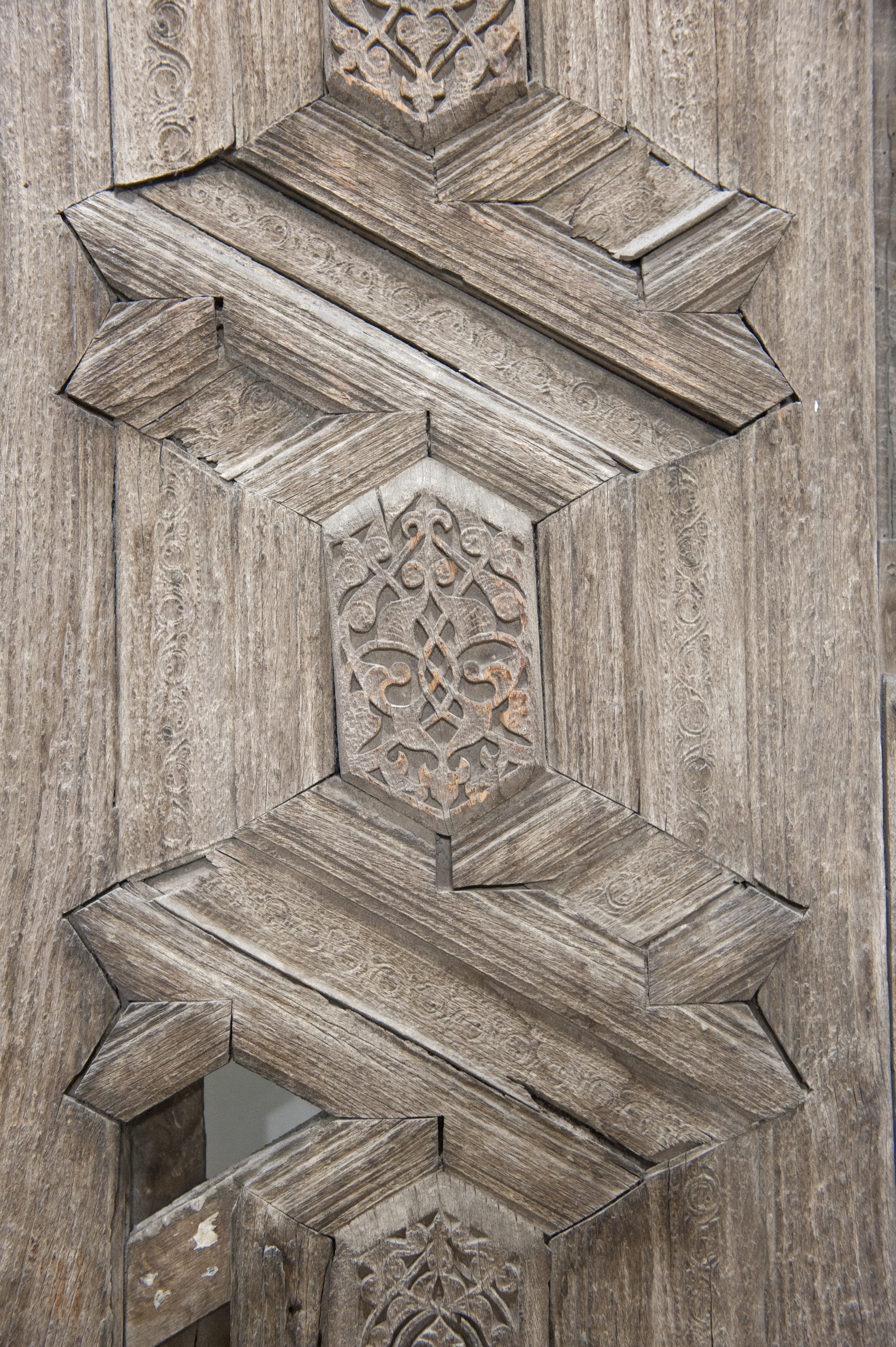
Atatürk Congress and Ethnographic Museum in Sivas - Divrigi woodwork

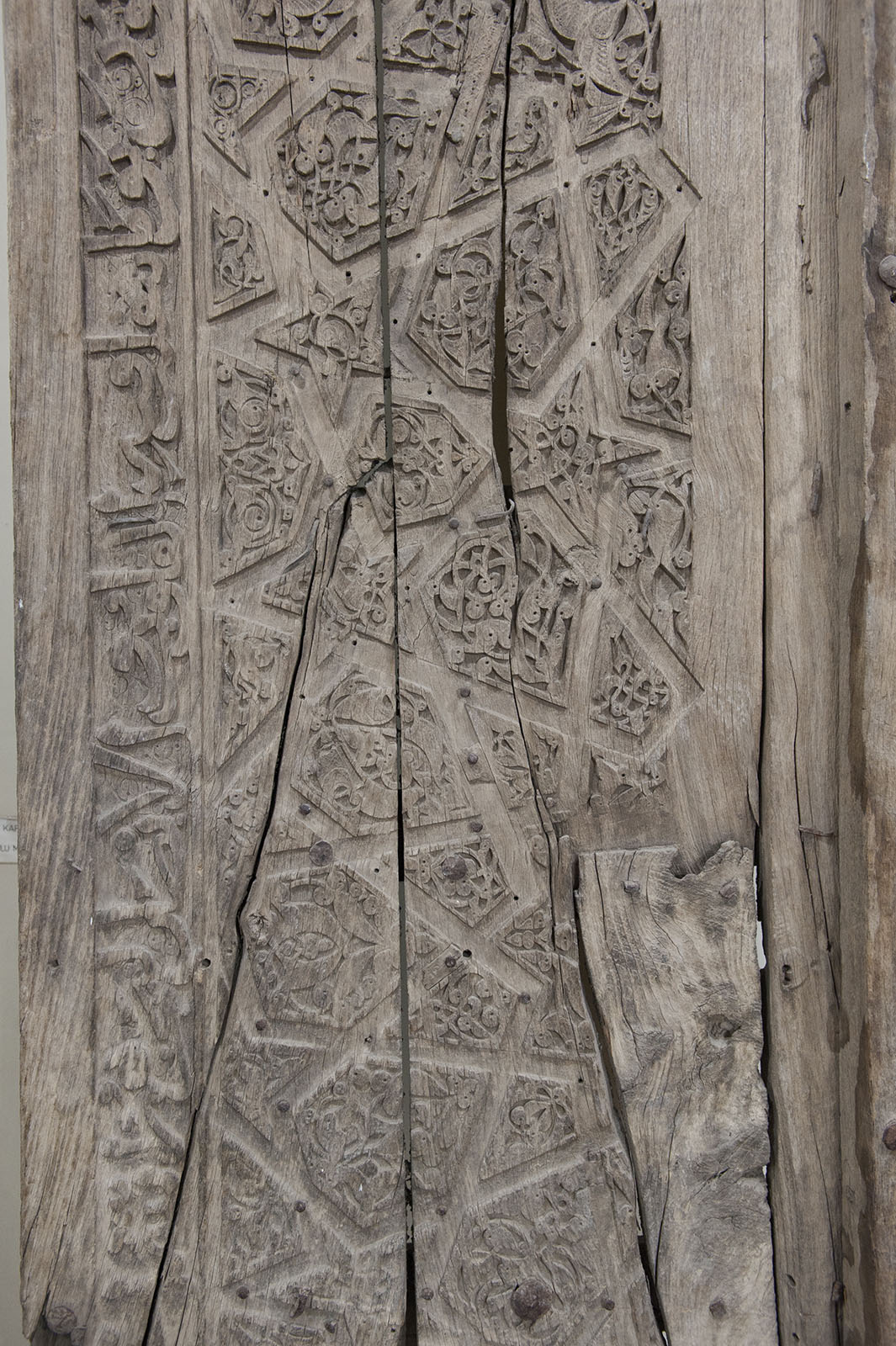
Atatürk Congress and Ethnographic Museum in Sivas - Divrigi woodwork

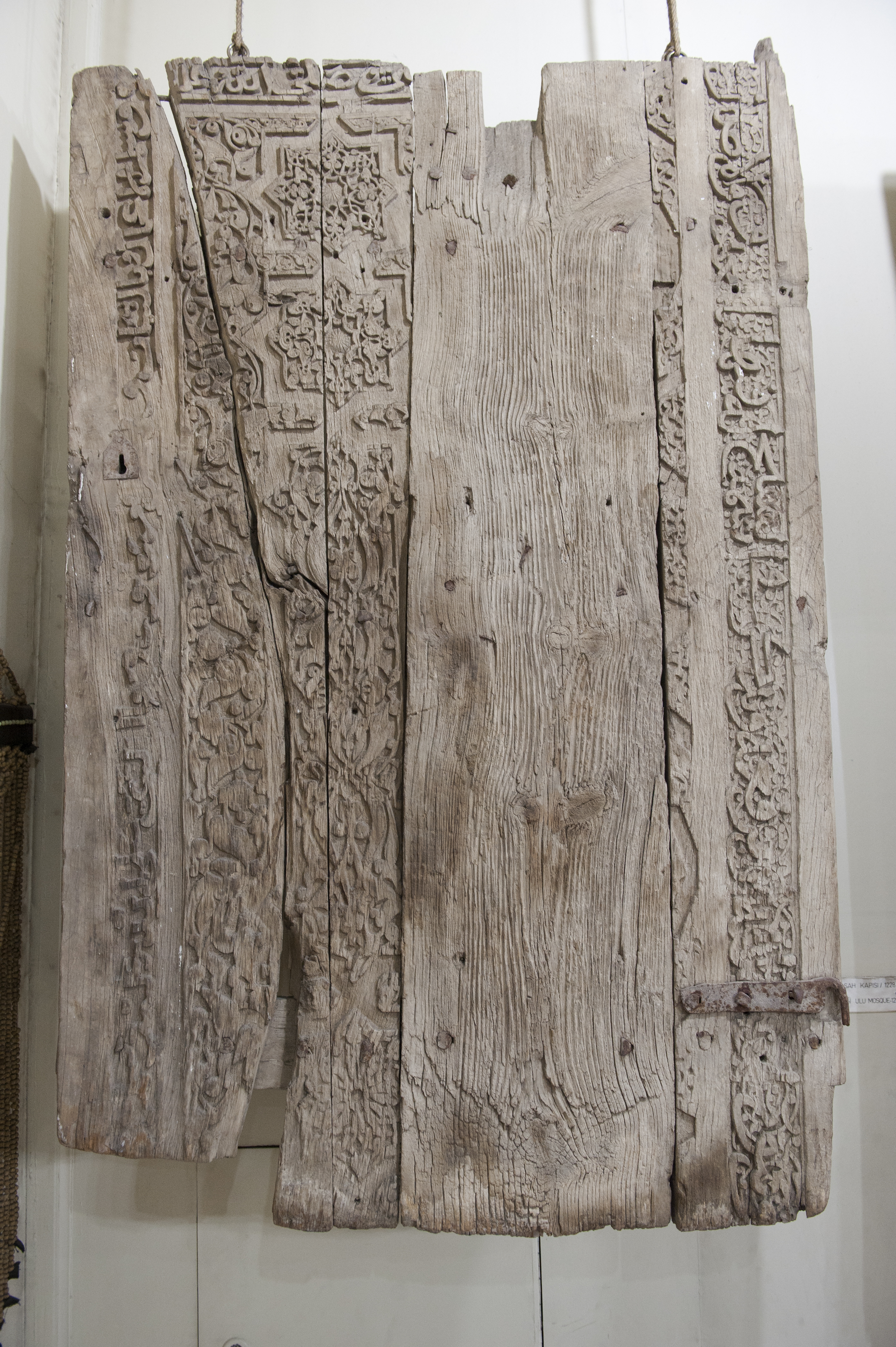
Atatürk Congress and Ethnographic Museum in Sivas - Divrigi woodwork

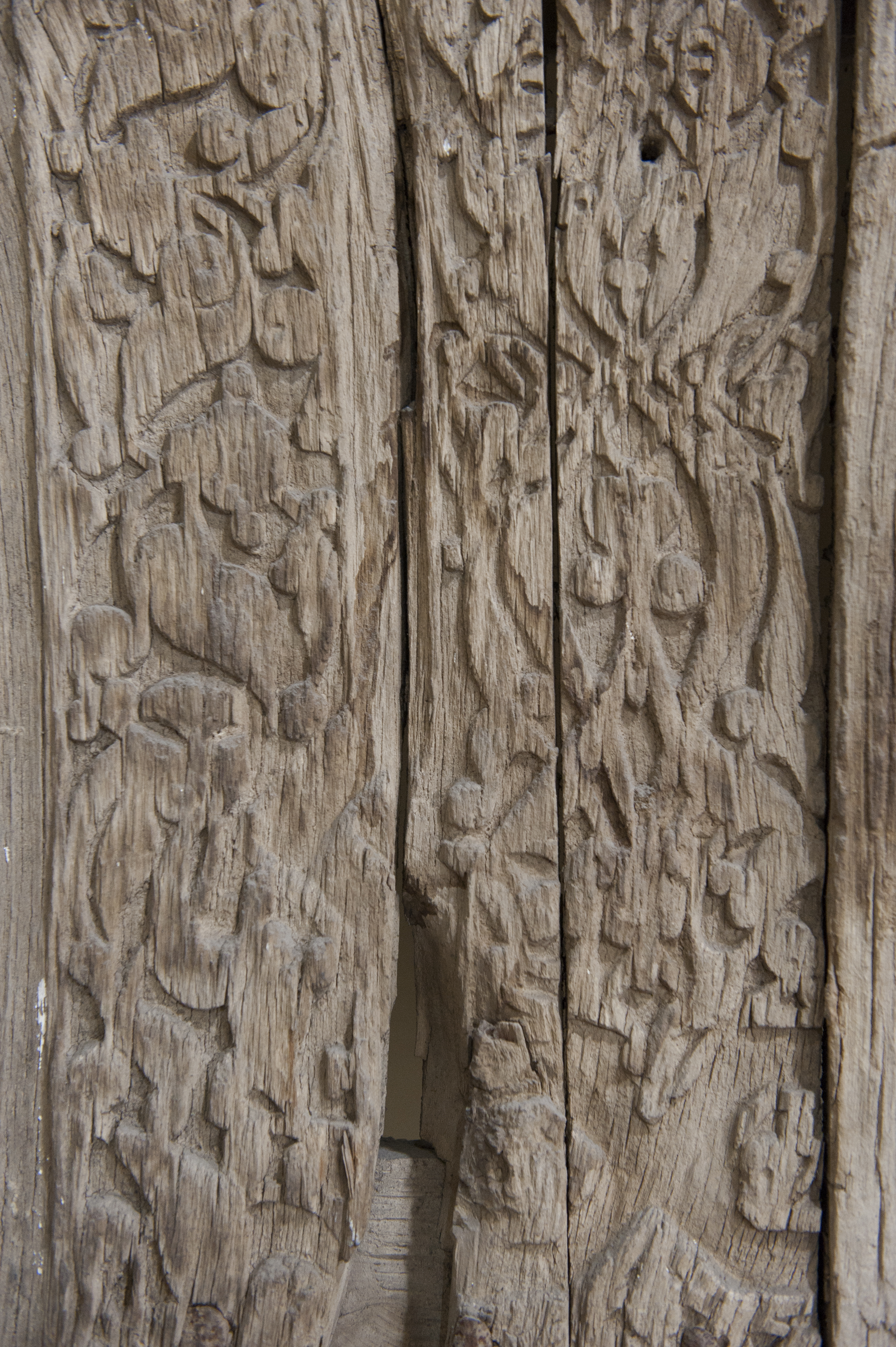
Atatürk Congress and Ethnographic Museum in Sivas - Divrigi woodwork

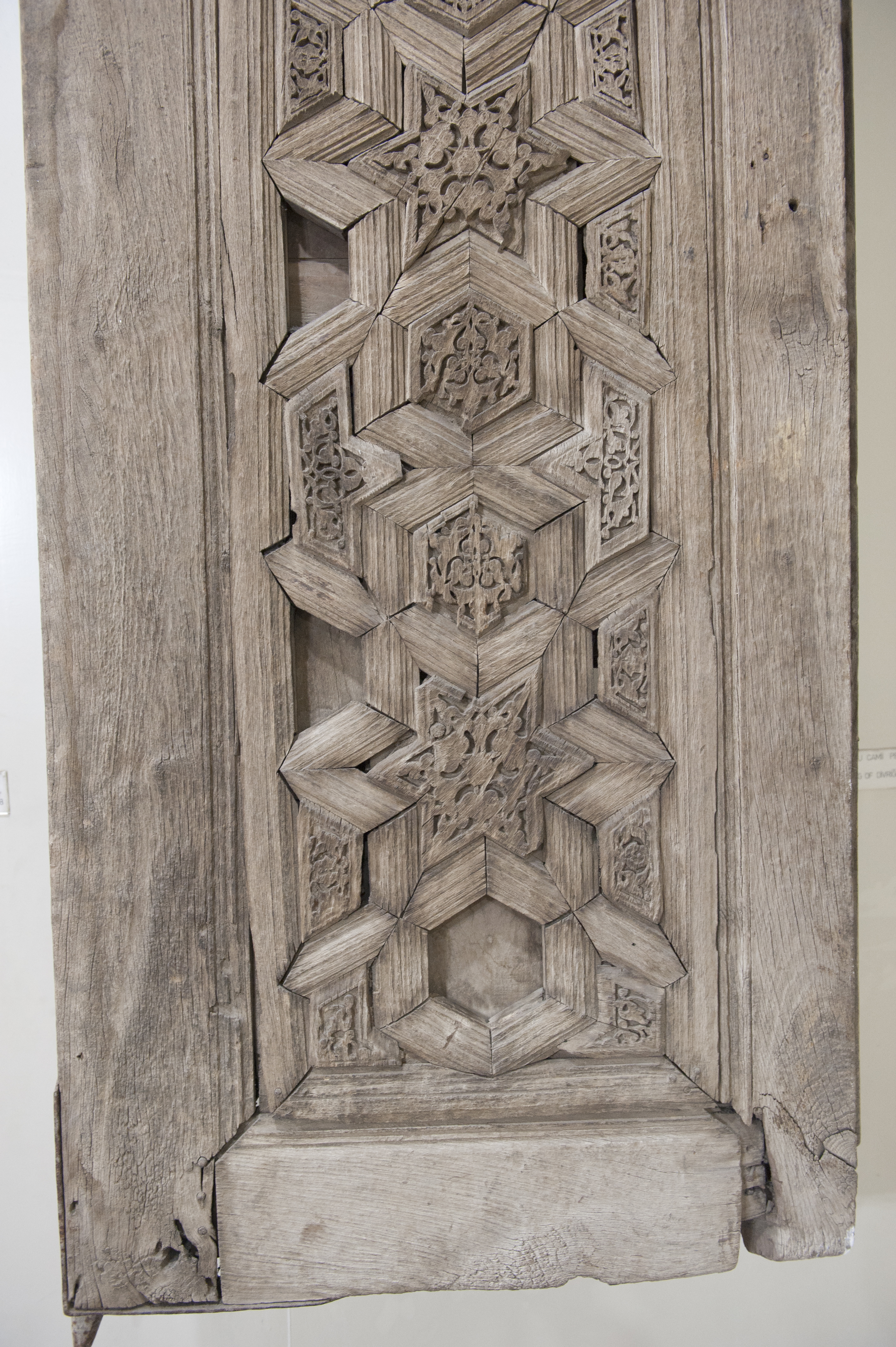
Atatürk Congress and Ethnographic Museum in Sivas - Divrigi woodwork

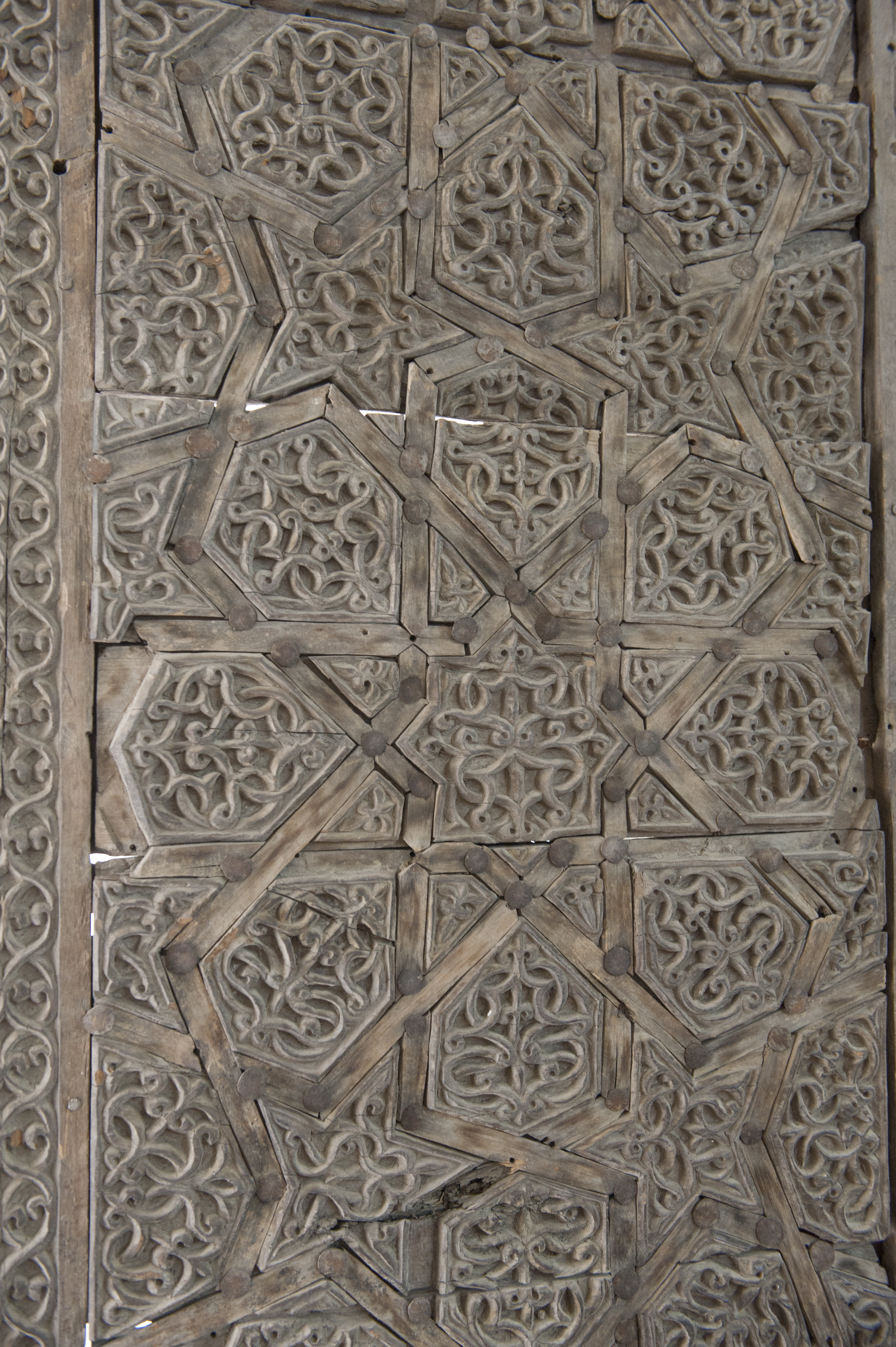
Atatürk Congress and Ethnographic Museum in Sivas - Divrigi Kale Mosque minber

On the upper floor, Atatürk and the Congress section, one room is where the congress was held. There is also a telegraph room (which was the only means of communication in 1919) and a printing room. Copies of documents are also on display.

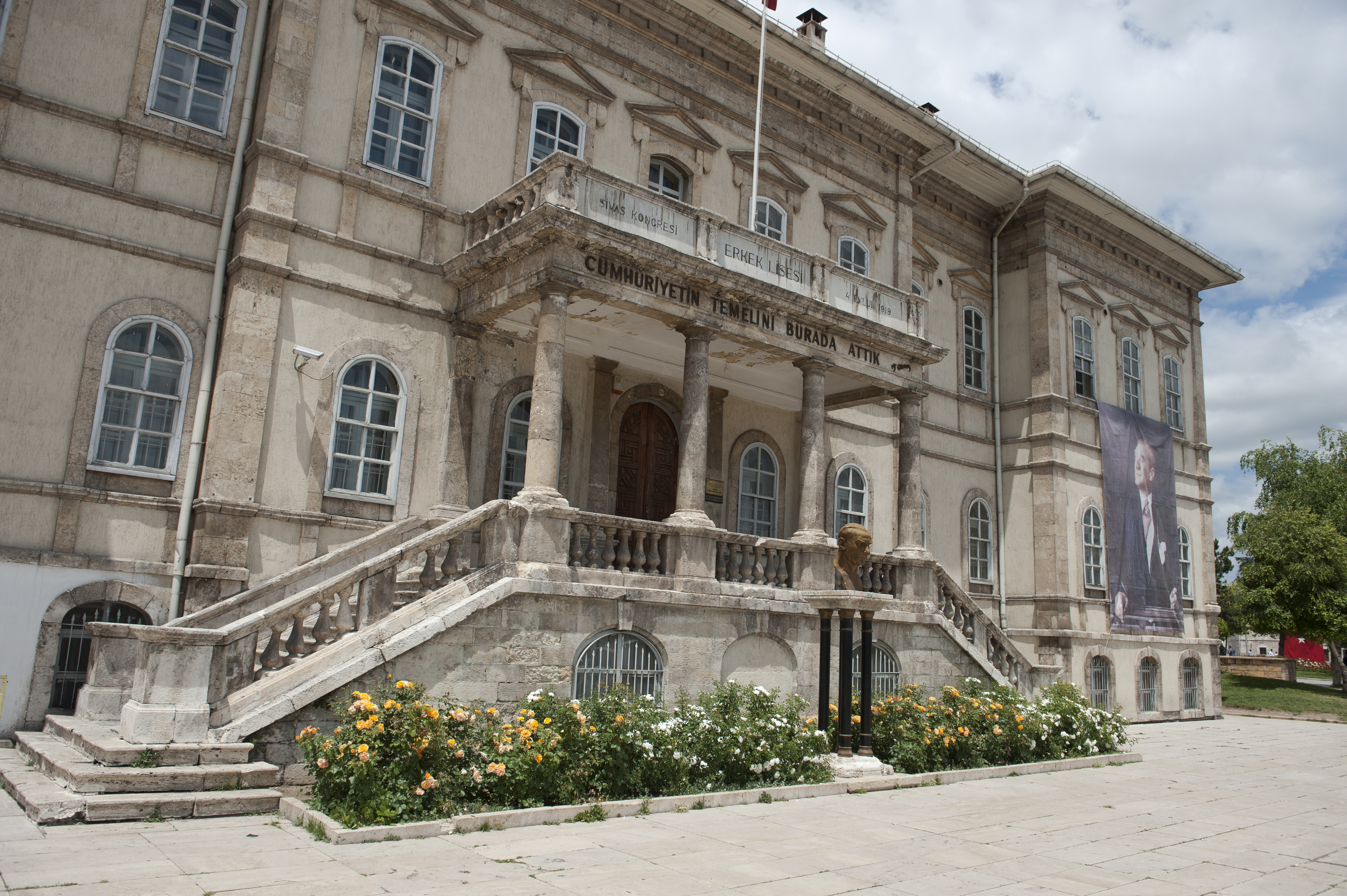
Atatürk Congress and Ethnographic Museum in Sivas Front of building

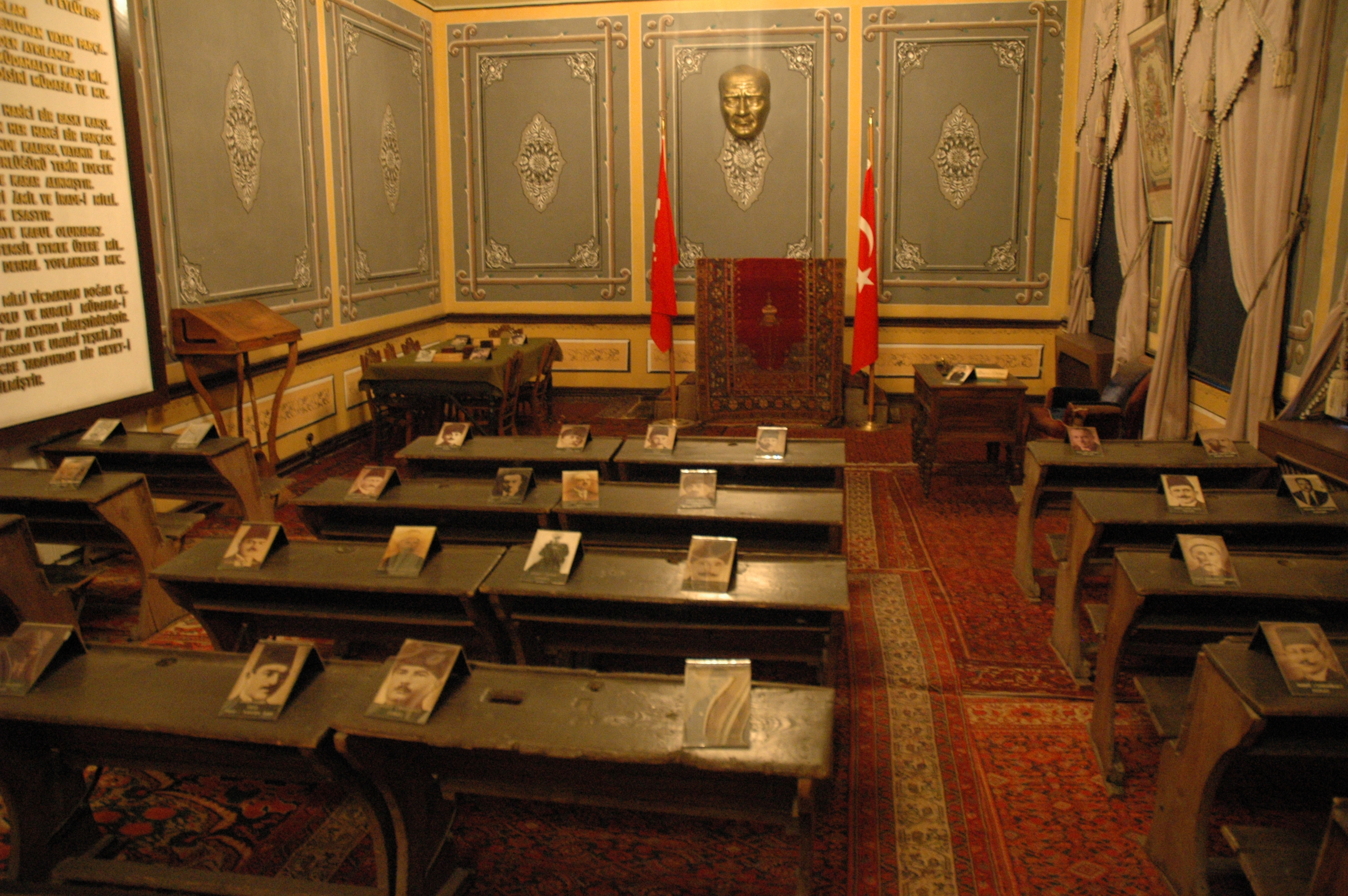
Atatürk Congress and Ethnographic Museum in Sivas Congress room

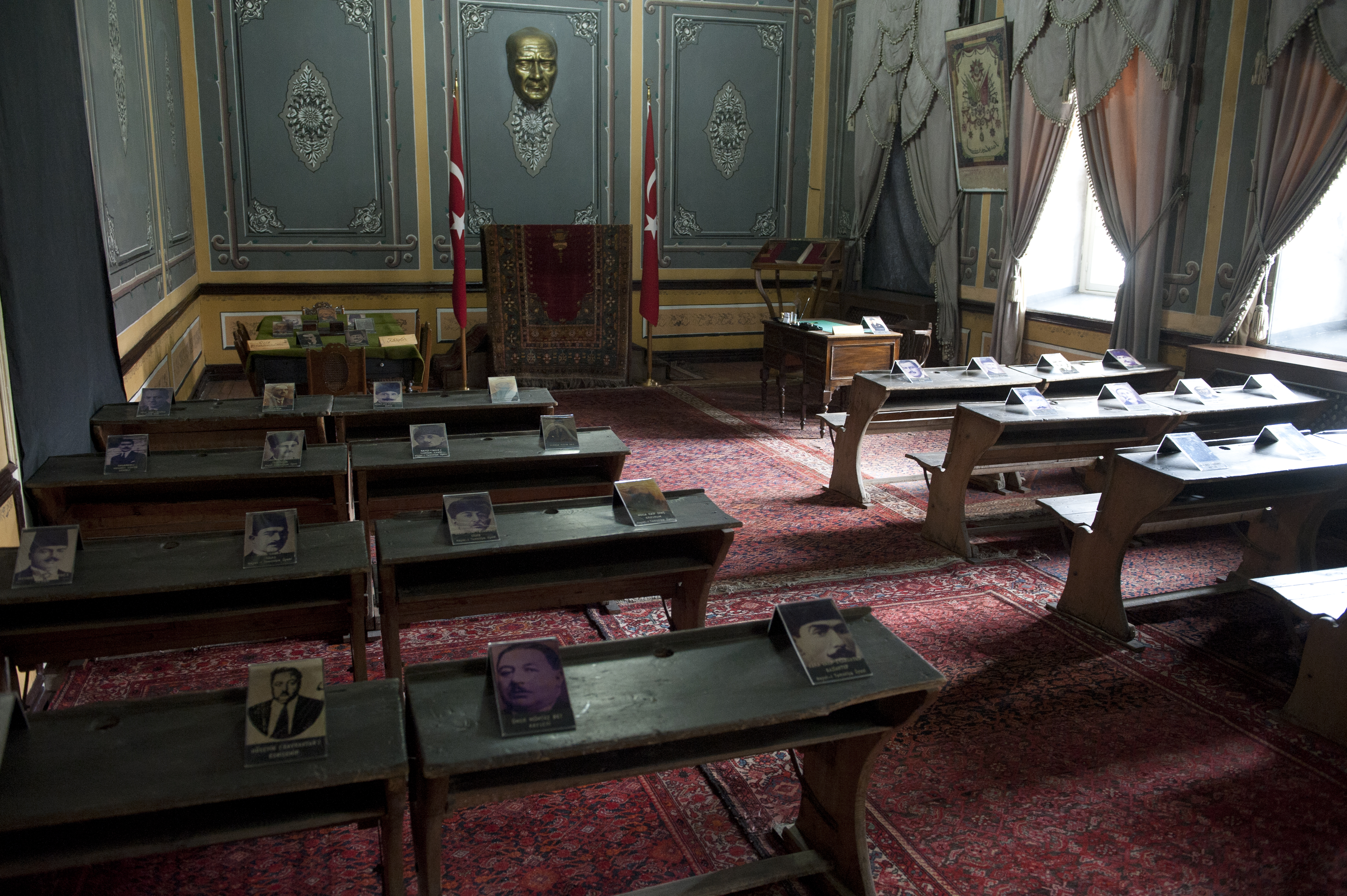
Atatürk Congress and Ethnographic Museum in Sivas Congress room

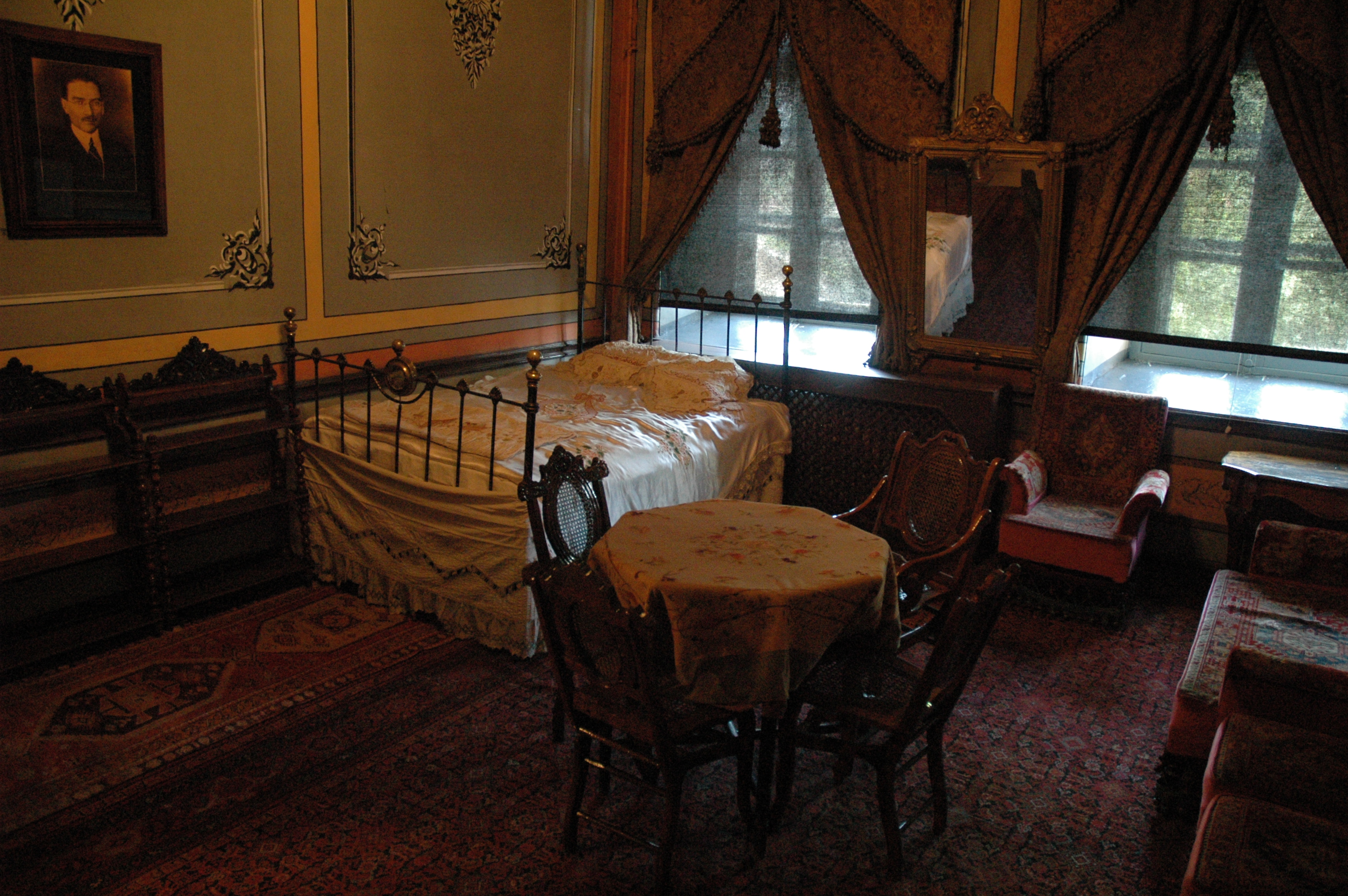
Atatürk Congress and Ethnographic Museum in Sivas Bedroom

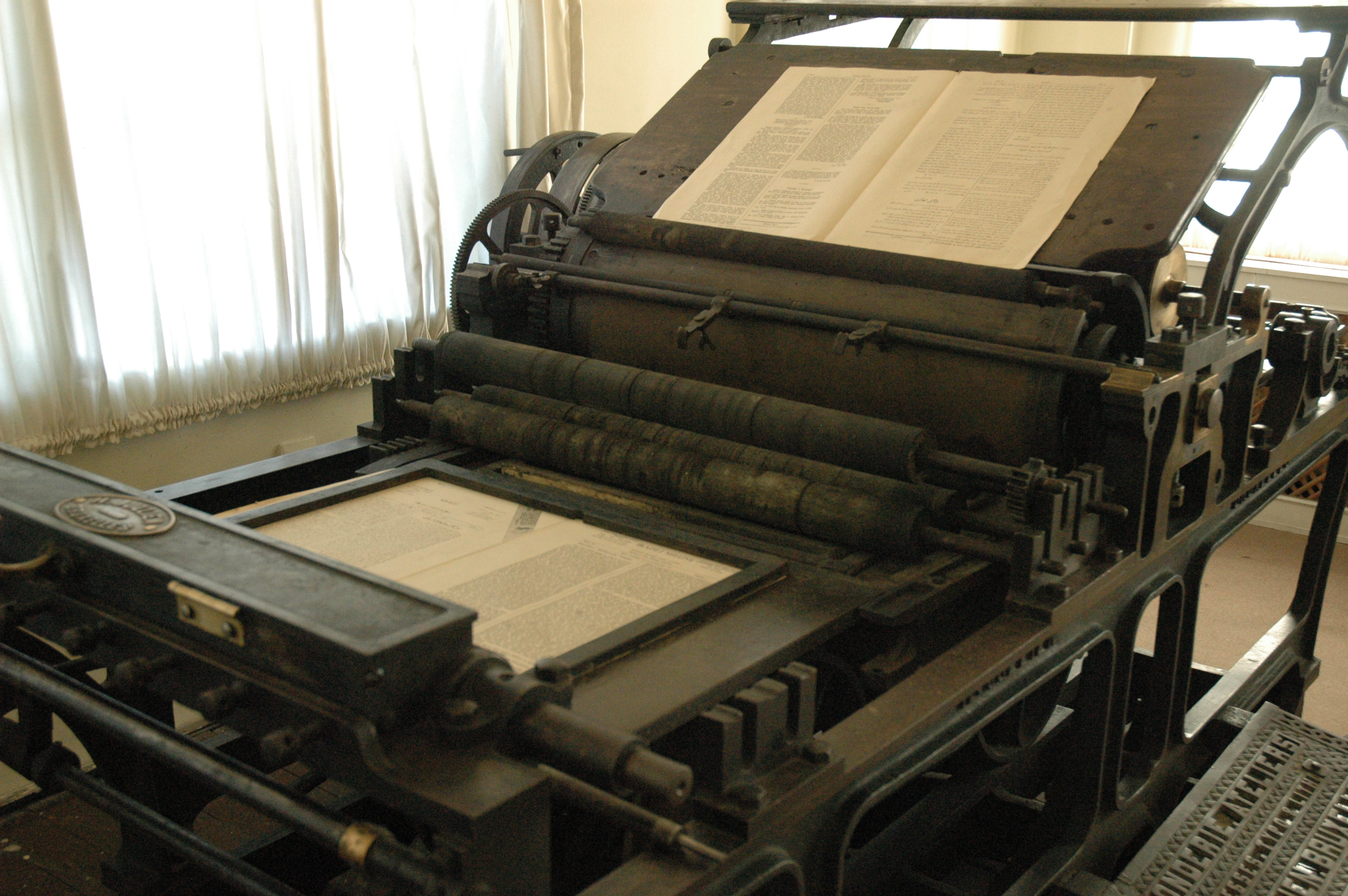
Atatürk Congress and Ethnographic Museum in Sivas Printing press

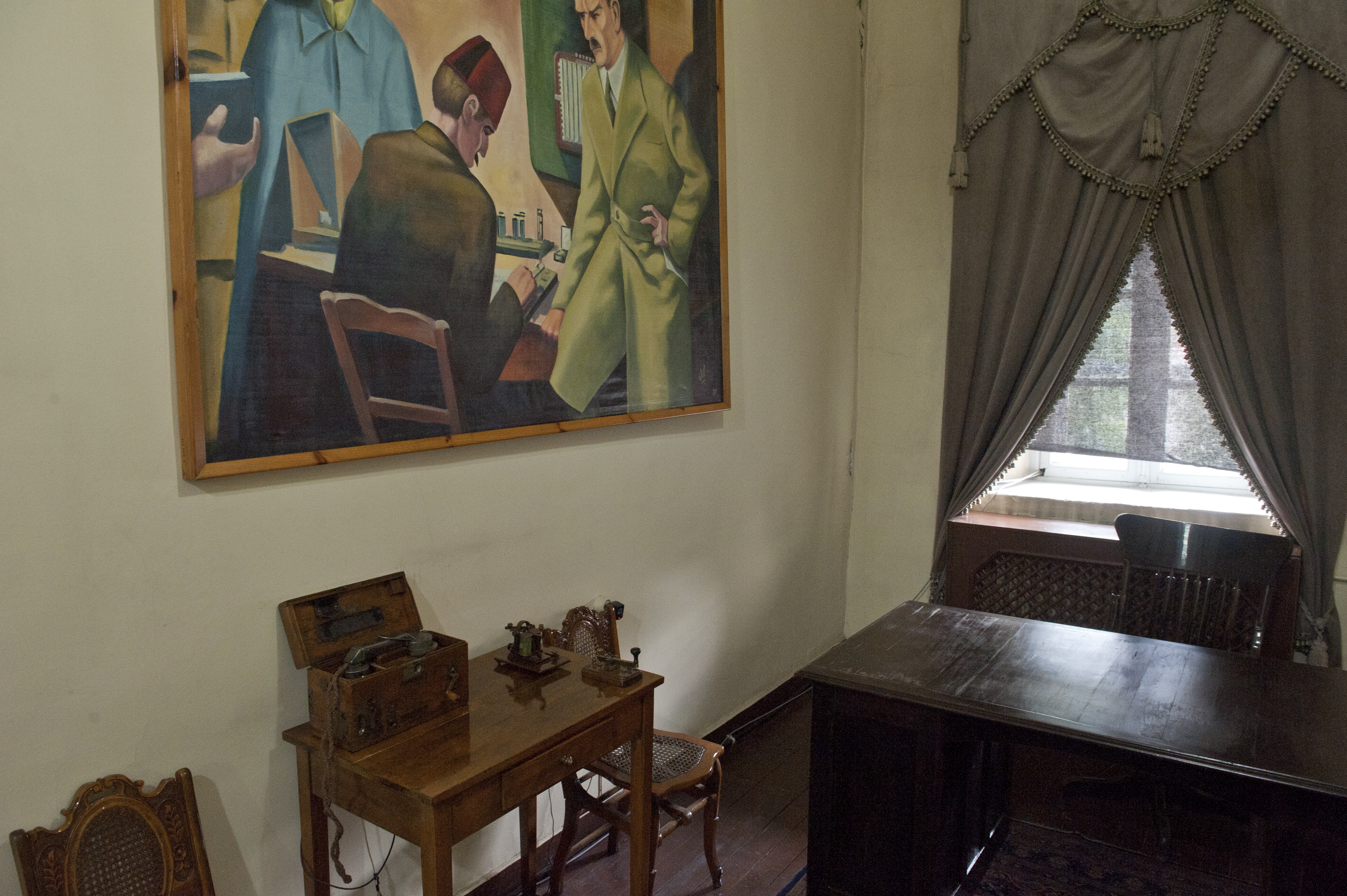
Atatürk Congress and Ethnographic Museum in Sivas Cabler room
