= Atatürk's Address To Turkish Youth =

1927 speech by Mustafa Kemal Atatürk

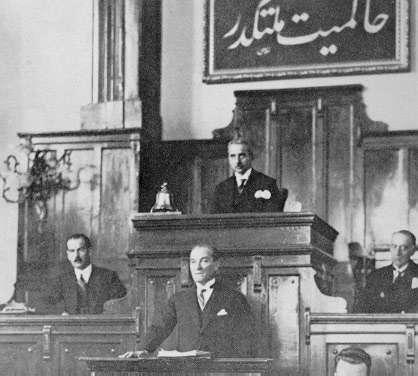
Mustafa Kemal Atatürk reading the address at the Grand National Assembly of the Republic of Turkey, 1927. Background (Calligraphy): حاكميت ملتكدر Hakimiyet Milletindir means "Sovereignty Belongs to the Nation”

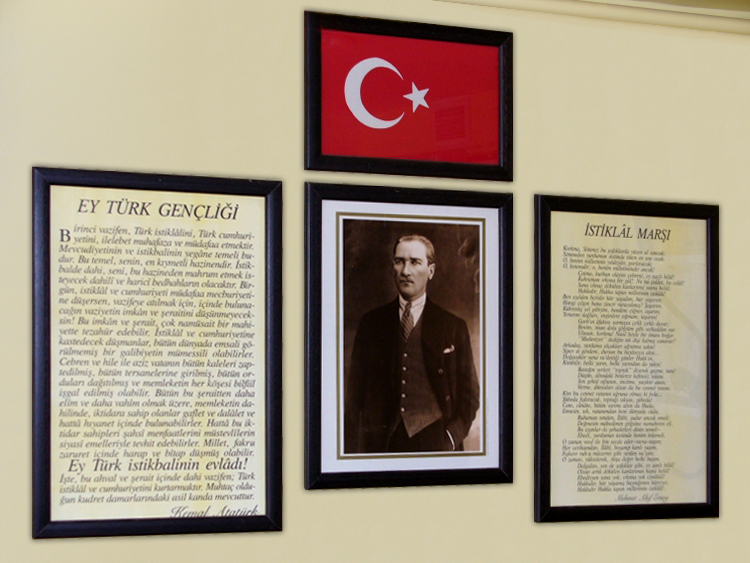
An example of a common classroom display in Turkey, including the speech at far left.

Atatürk's Address To The Youth of Turkey (Turkish: Atatürk'ün Türk Gençliğine Hitabesi) is a famous speech by the Republic of Turkey's first president and founding father, Mustafa Kemal Atatürk, spoken as the concluding statements to his 36-hour 20 October 1927 address to the Parliament, wherein he laid out, in a sweeping and thoroughly detailed retrospective, the history and intellectual foundations of the Turkish War of Independence and the fight for modernity that fueled the Turkish Revolution, and ultimately led to the October 29, 1923 establishment of the Republic of Turkey.

The speech is a direct address to the present and future younger generations of the country, and functions as a call to vigilance in the face of difficulties that may face the nation, as well as a reminder of the civic and patriotic duty of each citizen to protect their freedoms in the face of internal and external adversaries.

A framed version of the speech typically occupies the wall above the blackboard in the classrooms of Turkish schools, accompanied by a Turkish flag, a photograph of the country's founding father Atatürk, and a copy of the national anthem.

== Atatürk's Address To Turkish Youth ==
O, Turkish Youth!

Your first mission is to forever safeguard and defend Turkish independence and the Turkish Republic.

This is the foundation of your existence and your future. This foundation is your most valuable treasure. Even in the future, there will be domestic and foreign evils who will want to deprive you of this treasure. One day, if you are obliged to defend independence and the Republic, you will not worry about the means and the condition of your circumstances. These means and condition may appear to be of an unfavourable character. The enemies that threaten your independence and your Republic may be the representatives of an unprecedented victory around the world. By force and trickery, all the strongholds of the holy motherland may have been captured, all of its dockyards may have been occupied, all of its armies may have been disbanded, and every corner of the country may have been materially occupied. Even more severe and horrible than all these circumstances, those who have power within the state may act with blindness and heresy, even treachery. These rulers may amalgamate their personal interests with the occupiers' political objectives. The nation may be devastated and exhausted in abject poverty.

O, child of the Turkish future! Here it is, even in these circumstances and conditions, your mission is to save Turkish independence and the Turkish Republic. The power you need is in the noble blood in your veins!

Gazi Mustafa Kemal Atatürk, 27 October 1927.
