= Committee of Representation =

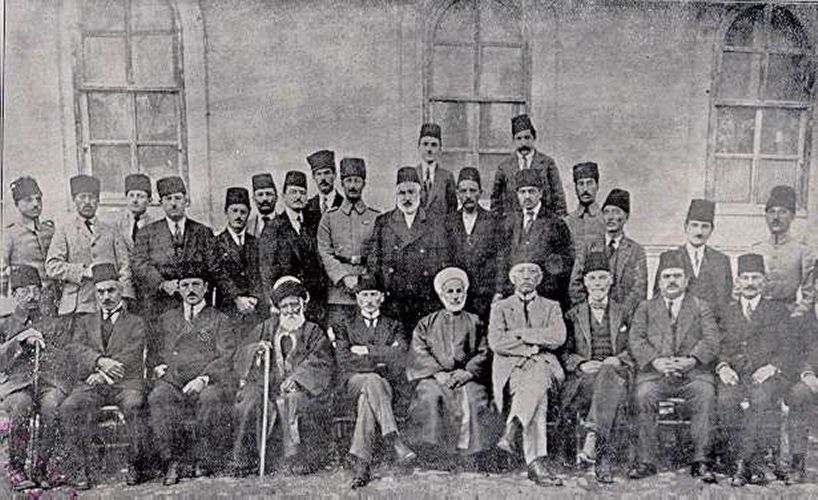
Members of the Sivas Congress in September 1919.

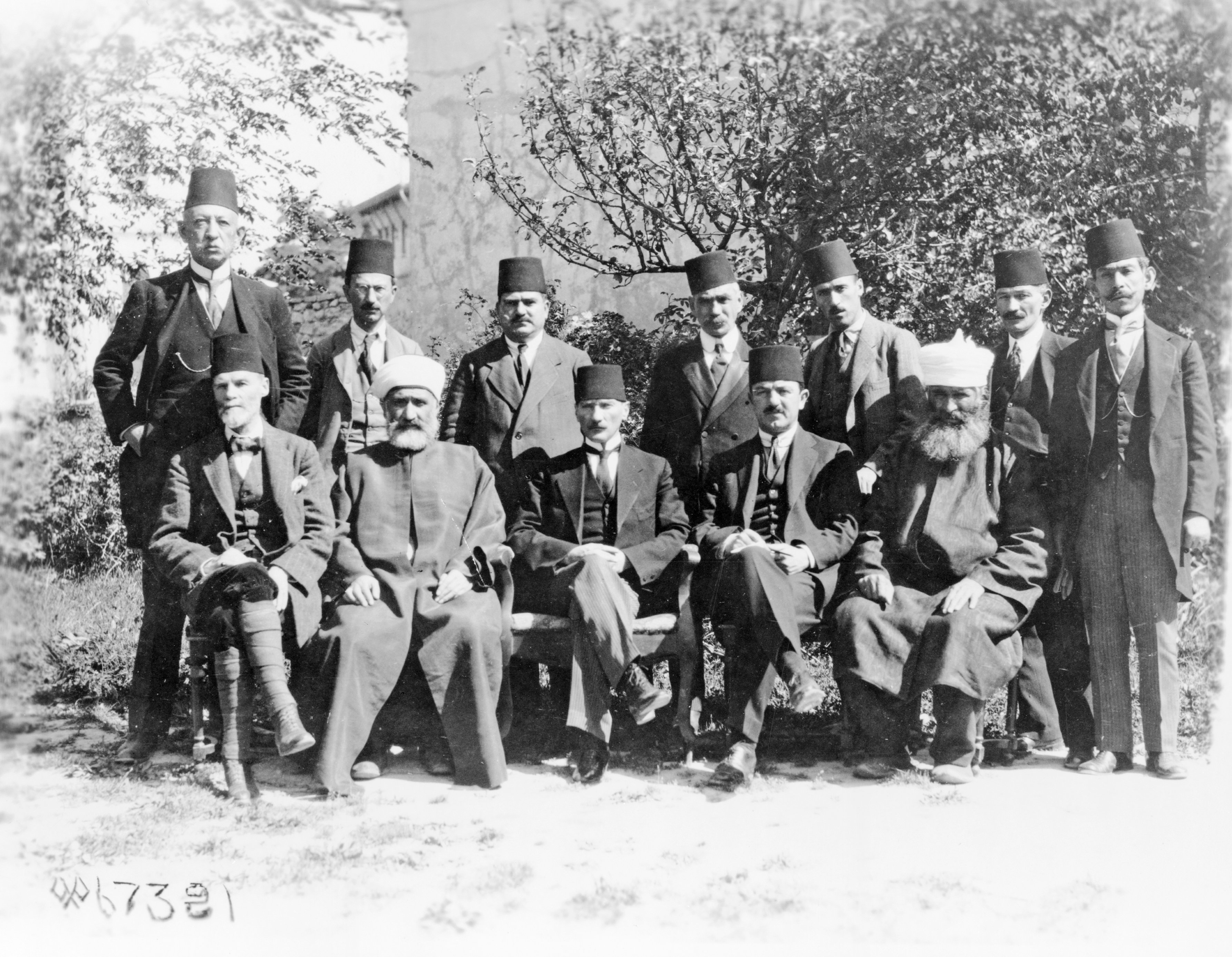
Members of the Sivas Congress in 1919

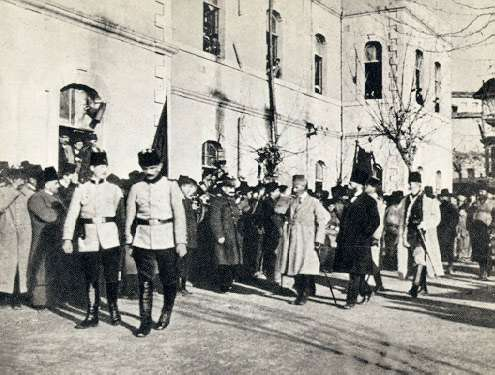
First arrival of the Representative Committee in Ankara on December 27, 1919.

Committee of Representation (Turkish: Heyet-i Temsiliye) was the executive branch of Kemalists before the opening of Turkish Grand Assembly in the 1919–1920 period.

== Background ==
After the Ottoman Empire was defeated in the World War I, Turkish nationalists met in Sivas and decided to struggle for the freedom of Turkey. Although the resulting Sivas Congress ended on 11 September 1919, a committee was established as the executive branch of the congress.

== The members of the committee ==
The number of the representatives in the committee was 16. (Actually 9 members were already chosen in the earlier Erzurum Congress.) Some of the committee members were;

- Mustafa Kemal Pasha (Atatürk)
- Rauf Bey (Orbay)
- Bekir Sami Bey (Kunduh)
- Refet Bey (Bele)
- Kara Vâsıf Bey (Karakol)
- Mazhar Müfit bey (Kansu)

However some of the other members were indifferent to committee and the committee never met with the total number of representatives. Later (1927) Mustafa Kemal Atatürk in his Nutuk (Great speech) complained of the indifference of some of the committee members.

== During the committee rule ==
Following an unsuccessful plot to arrest Mustafa Kemal by a governor (Ali Galip) of the Ottoman government, the committee banned all communication between Anatolian cities and Istanbul. The Ottoman prime minister Damat Ferit Pasha resigned. Although a new Ottoman government (Ali Rıza Pasha's government) was formed in Istanbul, the committee continued to serve as an alternative government in Sivas. On 27 December 1919 the committee members moved to Ankara.

The sultan Mehmet VI decided to reopen the General Assembly of the Ottoman Empire in Istanbul after the elections held in 1919 December. The committee supported this decision and in fact some members of the committee (such as Rauf Bey and Kara Vasıf Bey) attended the parliament. The parliament met on 12 January 1920. However, on 18 March 1920, the British forces in Istanbul occupied the city and closed the parliament. The committee members as well as other sympathizers to the Turkish National Struggle were arrested and were sent exile to Malta.

Occupation of Istanbul gave the committee the chance to open the parliament in Ankara. On 23 April 1920 Turkish Grand Assembly was opened in Ankara.

== Aftermath ==
After the opening of the Turkish parliament 1st cabinet of the Executive Ministers of Turkey (government) was formed instead of the committee.

== Gallery ==
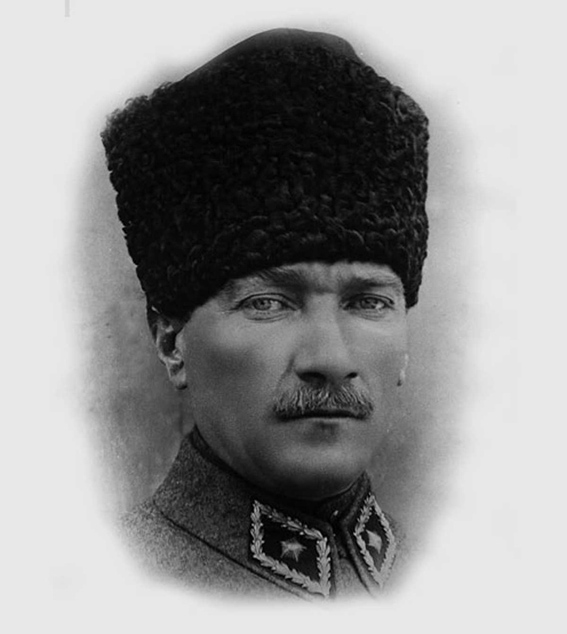
Mustafa Kemal Pasha

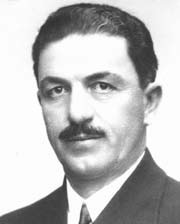
Rauf Bey

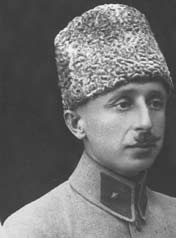
Refet Bey

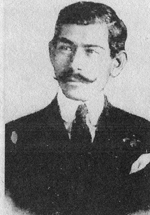
Kara Vasıf Bey

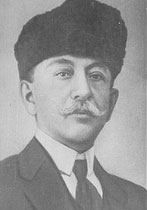
Bekir Sami Bey

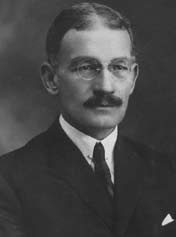
Mazhar Müfit Bey
