= Casern =

Military barracks in a garrison town

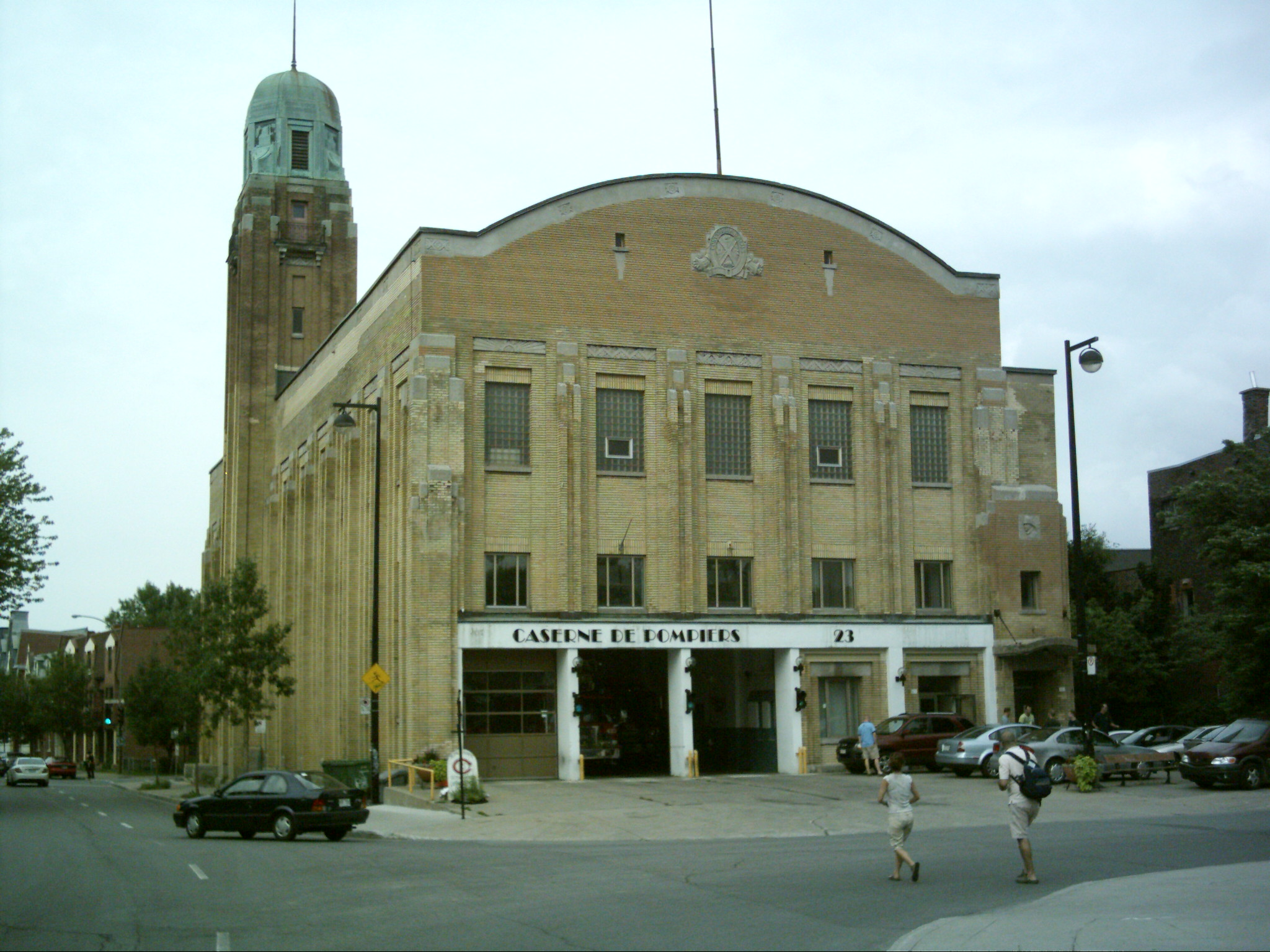
Caserne St-Henri, Montreal

A casern, also spelled cazern or caserne, is a military barracks in a garrison town. In French-speaking countries, a caserne de pompier is a fire station.

In fortification, caserns are little rooms, lodgments, or apartments, erected between the ramparts, and the houses of fortified towns, or even on the ramparts themselves; to serve as lodgings for the soldiers of the garrison, to ease the garrison, in Portugal and Brazil "Quartel" (derived for 4 faces).

There are usually two beds in each casern, for six soldiers to lie, who mount the guard alternately; the third part being always on duty.
