= Muzaffer Kılıç =

Turkish politician (1897–1959)

Ahmet Muzaffer Kılıç
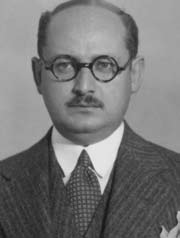

Member of the Grand National Assembly

Personal details
- Born: 1897 Constantinople, Ottoman Empire
- Died: 1959 (aged 61–62) Ankara, Turkey

Ahmet Muzaffer Kılıç (1897–1959) was a Turkish soldier during the Turkish Liberation War, a member of the Turkish National Movement, and a politician of the Republic of Turkey.

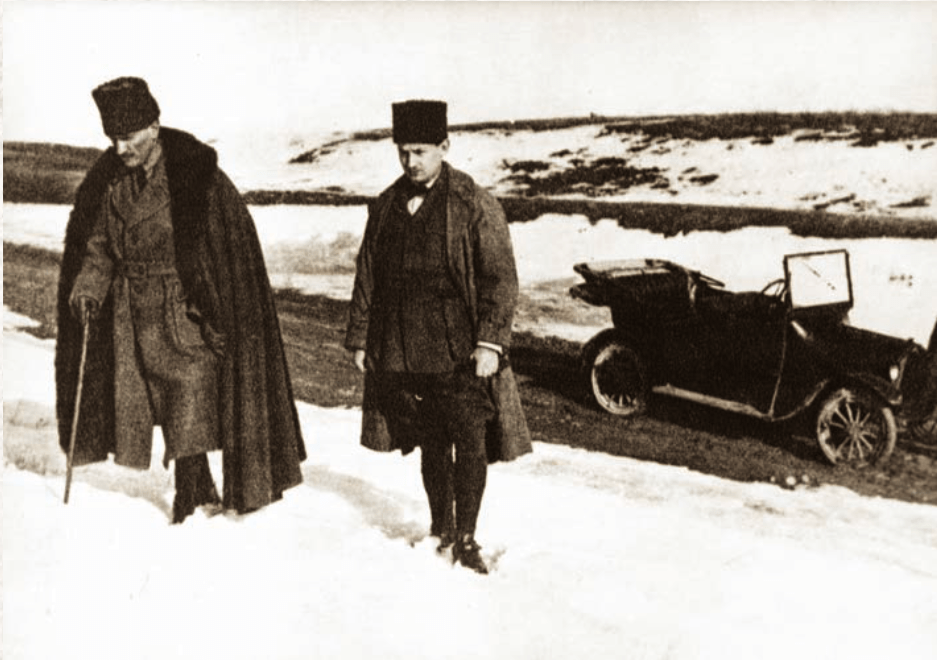
Atatürk and his aide Muzaffer Kılıç (Ankara, 15 February 1921)
