= Turkish National Movement =

Revolutionary post-WWI political movement which founded the Republic of Turkey

- Millî Hareket
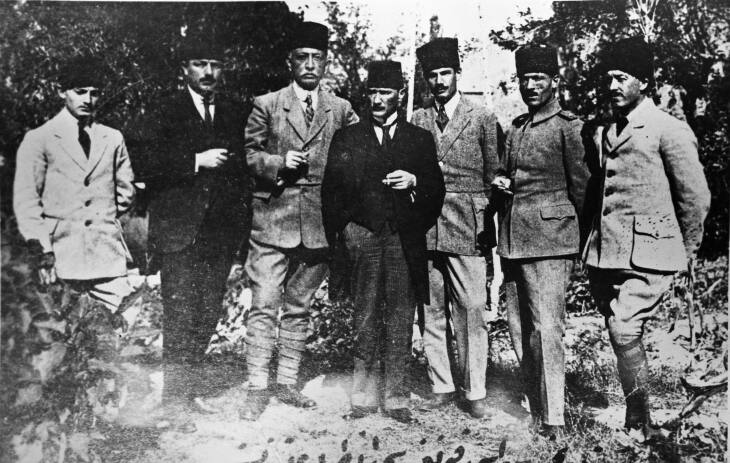
- Prominent nationalists at the Sivas Congress. Left to right: Ahmet Muzaffer (Kılıç), Rauf Bey (Orbay), Bekir Sami (Kunduh), Mustafa Kemal (Atatürk), Ruşen Eşref (Ünaydın), Cemil Cahit (Toydemir), Cevat Abbas (Gürer).
- Leader: Mustafa Kemal Pasha
- Dates active: June 22, 1919–October 29, 1923
- Country: Turkey
- Allegiance: Government of the Grand National Assembly
- Headquarters: Ankara
- Active regions: Anatolia, Thrace
- Ideology: National Oath; Turkish nationalism Popular sovereignty Constitutionalism; Proto-republicanism; Anti-imperialism; Halkçılık; Factions: Reformism; Radicalism; Conservatism; İttihadism; Monarchism; Socialism; Liberalism; Centralization; Decentralization
- Political position: Right-wing to left-wing

The Turkish National Movement (Turkish: Türk Ulusal Hareketi or Millî Hareket), also known as the Anatolian Movement (Turkish: Anadolu Hareketi), the Nationalist Movement (Turkish: Milliyetçi Hareket), and the Kemalists (Turkish: Kemalîler, Kemalciler or Kemalistler), included political and military activities of the Turkish nationalists that resulted in the creation and shaping of the modern Republic of Turkey, as a consequence of the defeat of the Ottoman Empire in World War I and the subsequent occupation of Constantinople and partitioning of the Ottoman Empire by the Allies under the terms of the Armistice of Mudros. The Turkish nationalists rebelled against this partitioning and against the Treaty of Sèvres, signed in 1920 by the Ottoman government. Most nationalists were former members of the Committee of Union and Progress.

This establishment of an alliance of Turkish nationalists during the partitioning resulted in the Turkish War of Independence, the genocides of the Anatolian native nations, the abolition of the Ottoman sultanate on 1 November 1922 and the declaration of the Republic of Turkey on 29 October 1923. The movement organized itself into the Association for the Defence of National Rights of Anatolia and Rumeli, which eventually declared that the only source of governance for the Turkish people would be the Grand National Assembly of Turkey.

The movement was created in 1919 through a series of agreements and conferences throughout Anatolia and Thrace. The process was aimed to unite independent movements around the country to build a common voice and is attributed to Mustafa Kemal Atatürk, as he was the primary spokesperson, public figure, and military leader of the movement.

== Amasya Agreement, June 1919 ==
The Amasya Agreement was important in many respects. It was the first call to the national movement against the occupying powers. It consisted of talks about national independence. The message read as follows:

- The unity of the motherland and national independence are in danger.
- The Istanbul government is unable to carry out its responsibilities.
- It is only through the nation's effort and determination that national independence will be won.
- It is necessary to establish a national committee, free from all external influences and control, that will review the national situation and make known to the world the peoples desires for justice.
- It has been decided to hold immediately a National Congress in Sivas, the most secure place in Anatolia.
- Three representatives from each province should be sent immediately to the Sivas Congress.
- To be prepared for every eventuality, this subject should be kept a national secret.
- There will be a congress for the Eastern Provinces on July 10. The delegation from the Erzurum Congress will depart to join to the general meeting in Sivas.

This agreement was signed by Mustafa Kemal Atatürk, Rauf Orbay, Ali Fuat Cebesoy, Refet Bele and later Kâzım Karabekir in Erzurum.

== Conferences ==
=== Erzurum Congress, August 1919 ===
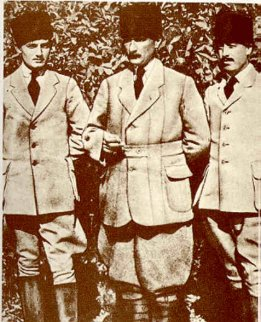
Mustafa Kemal Pasha during the Erzurum Congress.

On American Mandate: On 1 August 1919, the King-Crane Commission tried to contact a large groups of interested parties in Constantinople (Ottoman Control), to obtain their positions with a view toward reporting them to the Paris Peace Conference. Kazım Karabekir learned that a memorandum was adopted by an amalgamation of political groups in Constantinople and consequently, the Erzurum Congress, which has been in session since 23 July (until 7 August 1919) sent a memorandum to American President Woodrow Wilson on the same day (1 August). It was probably also meant to remind all other parties of Wilson's 14 Points and the fact that the Nationalists were aware of them. Among the objectives of the Nationalists was, it appears, to signal the resolve of the Nationalists to the interested parties, and display their intent not to tolerate indiscriminate political pressure. What began as a suggestion to the Nationalists to accept the American Mandate at the time of the Erzurum Congress, became a major campaign immediately afterwards. By the time Sivas Congress was convened, no less than three channels were working on the Nationalist leadership to persuade them at least to "consider" the American Mandate, if not outright adopt a resolution in favor of it at the Sivas Congress.

=== Sivas Congress, September 1919 ===
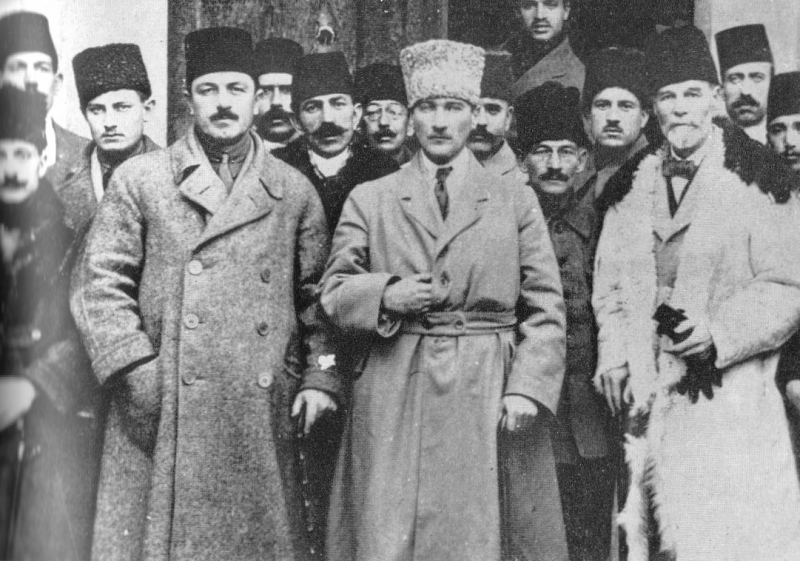
Members of the movement during the Sivas Congress, left to right: Rauf Orbay, Mustafa Kemal Atatürk, and Ahmet Rüstem Bilinski.

The Sivas Congress was the first time the fourteen leaders of the movement united under a single roof. These people formed a plan between 16 and 29 October. They agreed that the parliament should meet in Constantinople, even if it were obvious that this parliament could not function under the occupation. It was a great chance to build the base and legitimacy. They decided on formalizing a "Representative Committee" that would handle the distribution and implementation, which could easily be turned into a new government if allies decided to disband the whole Ottoman Governing structure. Mustafa Kemal established two concepts into this program: independence and integrity. Mustafa Kemal was setting the stage for conditions which would legitimize this organization and illegitimate the Ottoman parliament. These conditions were also mentioned in the Wilsonian rules.

Mustafa Kemal opened the National Congress at Sivas, with delegates from the entire nation taking part. The Erzurum resolutions were transformed into a national appeal, and the name of the organization changed to the Society to Defend the Rights and Interests of the provinces of Anatolia and Rumeli. The Erzurum resolutions were reaffirmed with minor additions, these included new clauses such as article 3 which states that the formation of an independent Greece on the Aydın, Manisa, and Balıkesir fronts was unacceptable. The Sivas Congress essentially reinforced the stance taken at the Erzurum Congress. All these were performed while the Harbord Commission arrived in Constantinople.

== Grand National Assembly, April 1920 ==
Plans were made to organize a new government and parliament in Ankara, and the sultan asked to accept its authority. A flood of supporters moved to Ankara just ahead of the Allied dragnets. Included among them were Halide Edip, her husband, Adnan Adıvar, İsmet İnönü, Kemal's most important allies in the Ministry of War, and the last president of the Chamber of Deputies, Celalettin Arif. The latter's desertion of the capital was of great significance. A legally elected president of the last representative Ottoman Parliament, he claimed that it had been dissolved illegally, in violation of the Constitution, enabling Kemal to assume full governmental powers for the Ankara regime.

In March 1920, he announced that the Turkish nation was establishing its own Parliament in Ankara under the name Grand National Assembly. Some 100 members of the Ottoman Parliament were able to escape the Allied roundup and joined 190 deputies elected around the country by the national resistance group. On April 23, 1920, the new Assembly gathered for the first time, making Mustafa Kemal its first president and İsmet Inonü, now deputy from Edirne, chief of the General Staff.

== Organizations associated with the movement ==
=== Political parties ===
- Anatolia and Rumeli Defence of Law Association – Anadolu ve Rumeli Müdâfaa-i Hukuk Cemiyeti
- National Salvation Group – Felah-ı Vatan Cemiyeti
- Renewal Party – Teceddüt Fırkası
- Ottoman Liberal People's Party – Osmanlı Hürriyetperver Avam Fırkası
- Ottoman Labour Party – Osmanlı Mesai Fırkası
- National Turk Party – Millî Türk Fırkası
- Turkish Communist Party – Türkiye Komünist Fırkası

==== Associations for the Defence of National Law ====
- Eastern Anatolia Defence of Law Association – Şarkî Anadolu Müdafaa-i Hukuk Cemiyeti
- İzmir Ottoman Defence of Law Association – İzmir Müdafaa-i Hukuku Osmaniye Cemiyeti
- Salvation of the Homeland Association – İstihlası Vatan Cemiyeti
- Thrace-Paşaeli Defence of Law Association – Trakya-Paşaeli Müdafaa-i Hukuk Cemiyeti
- Trabzon Conservation of Law National Association – Trabzon Muhafaza-i Hukuku Milliye Cemiyeti
- Cilicians Association – Kilikyalılar Cemiyeti
- National Movement and Rejection of Annexation Organizations – Hareket-i Milliye ve Redd-i İlhak Teşkilatları
- Adana Vilayet Defence of Law Association – Adana Vilayeti Müdafaa-i Hukuk Cemiyeti
- Kozan Defence of Law Association – Kozan Müdafaa-i Hukuk Cemiyeti
- Anatolia Woman's Defence of the Homeland Association – Anadolu Kadınları Müdafaa-i Vatan Cemiyeti
- Balıkesir Rejection of Annexation Association – Balıkesir Redd-i İlhak Cemiyeti
- Samsun Defence of Law Association – Samsun Müdâfaa-i Hukuk Cemiyeti

=== NGOs ===
- Turkish Hearths – Türk Ocakları
- Turkish National Student Union – Millî Türk Talebe Birliği
- Auspicious Society – Cemiyyet-i Hayriye

=== Militaries and paramilitaries ===
- National Forces – Kuva-yi Milliye
- Ordered Forces – Kuva-yi Nizamiye
- Traveling Forces (Green Army Organization) – Kuva-yi Seyyare

=== Intelligence organizations ===
- Guard Organization (Karakol Society) – Karakol Cemiyeti
- Mim Mim Group – Mim Mim Grubu
- Hamza Group – Hamza Grubu
- Officer's Group – Zabitân Grubu
- Yavuz Group – Yavuz Grubu

=== Provisional national governments ===
- Committee of Representation – Heyet-i Temsiliye
- Government of the Grand National Assembly (Ankara Government) – Büyük Millet Meclisi Hükûmeti

=== Provisional regional governments ===
- Aras Republic – Araz Respublikası
- Iğdır National Republic – Iğdır Millî Cumhuriyeti
- Provisional National Government of the Southwestern Caucasus – Cenub-ı Garbi Kafkas Hükûmet-i Muvakkate-i Milliyesi
- Oltu Council Government – Oltu Şura Hükûmeti

== Impact on non-Turkish minorities ==
Although the movement was presented as a struggle for national independence, it also opposed aspirations among minorities for independent states and Greek territorial claims in Anatolia. Historians have identified significant continuities between the nationalist movement and the preceding Committee of Union and Progress (CUP), including political personnel, organizational networks, and policies aimed at the ethnic homogenization of Anatolia. For certain Ottoman Christians who had survived genocide, the movement threatened aspirations for independence and the restoration of Christian communities, leading many of their political organizations to support Allied intervention and the establishment of an independent state. The withdrawal of French forces from Cilicia in 1921–1922 was accompanied by another mass exodus of genocide survivors. Anatolian Greeks likewise experienced massacres, deportations, and displacement during the Greco-Turkish War (1919–1922), including the mass deportation of Pontic Greeks by Turkish nationalist forces in 1921–1922. The compulsory Greek–Turkish population exchange of 1923 further dismantled longstanding Greek communities in Anatolia and contributed to the demographic homogenization of the new Turkish state. Assyrians, Syriacs, and Chaldeans, whose communities had already been devastated by massacres during the First World War, also experienced renewed persecution, dispossession, and displacement during the nationalist period that established the Turkish Republic. Consequently, scholars have interpreted the nationalist victory and subsequent republican nation-building as part of a broader transformation of Anatolia from a multiethnic society into an increasingly homogeneous Turkish nation-state, characterized by the mass displacement and forced assimilation of ethnic minorities.

== Conclusion ==
After the establishment of the movement and the successful Turkish War of Independence, the Turkish nationalists abolished the Ottoman sultanate on November 1, 1922, and proclaimed the Republic of Turkey on October 29, 1923. The movement terminated the Treaty of Sèvres and negotiated the Treaty of Lausanne, assuring recognition of the national borders, termed Misak-ı Millî (National Pact).

The national forces were united around the leadership of Mustafa Kemal Atatürk and the authority of the Grand National Assembly set up in Ankara, which pursued the Turkish War of Independence. The movement gathered around the idea of the integration of the other native populations (Greeks, Armenians, Assyrians) to make Turkish nation-state and a progressively defined political ideology that is generally termed "Kemalism", or "Atatürkçülük" ("Atatürkism"). Its basic principles stress the Republic - a form of government representing the power of the electorate, secular administration (laïcité), nationalism, a mixed economy with state participation in some sectors (as opposed to state socialism), and national modernization.

Turkish nationalists were influenced by ideas which flourished during the Tanzimat period; however, the Turkish nationalists promulgated a somewhat distinct conception of nationalism than that of the Young Turk movement of the same era, which was more associated with Ottomanism.

== See also ==
- Turkish War of Independence
- List of high-ranking commanders of the Turkish War of Independence
- Kuva-yi Milliye
