= Misak-ı Millî =

Decisions made by the last Ottoman Parliament

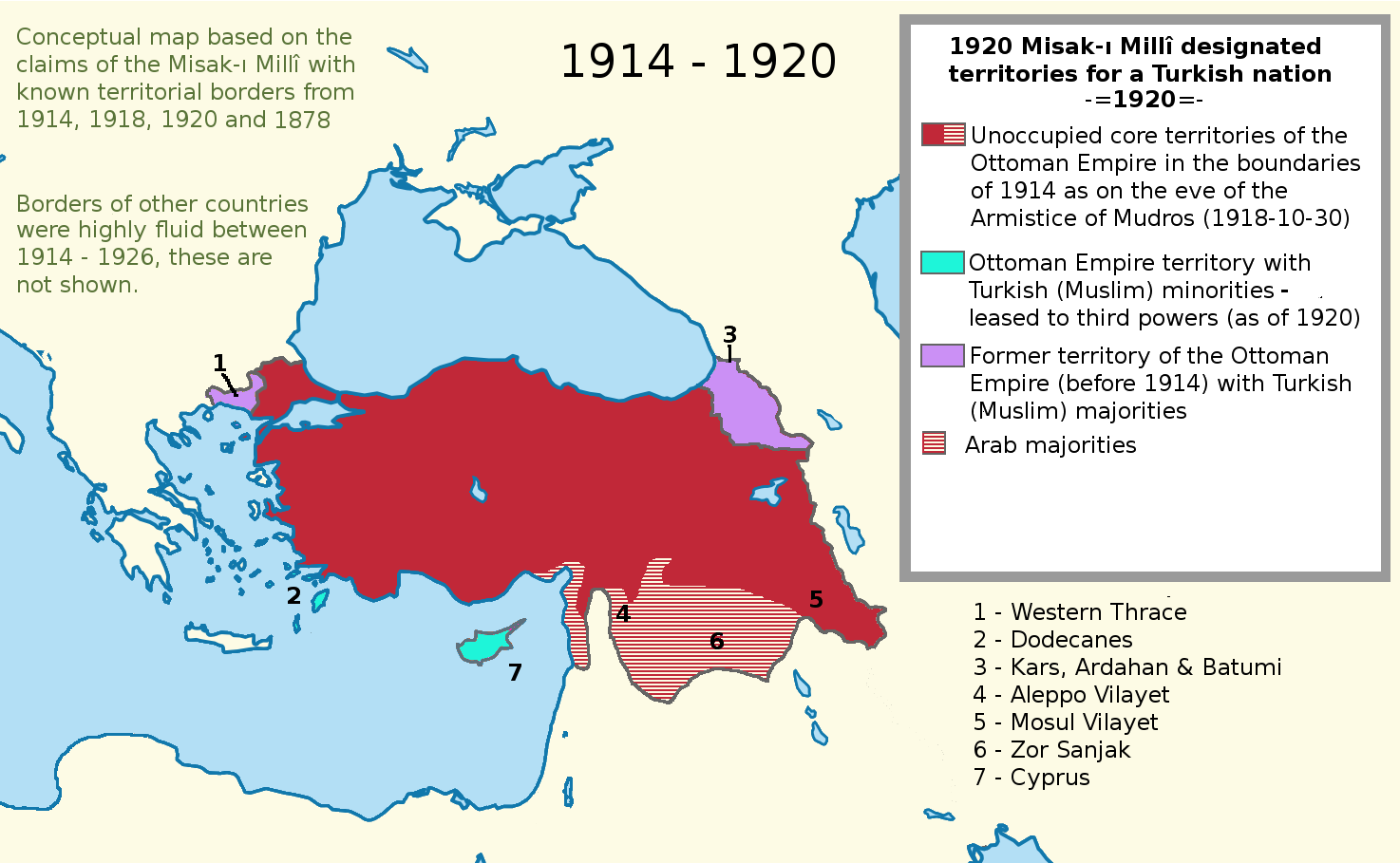
Turkey's borders according to the original National Pact. Some Turkish nationalists still claim these as the legitimate borders of modern-day Turkey.

Misak-ı Millî (Turkish: [misaːˈkɯ milˈliː], National Pact or National Oath) is the set of six decisions made by the last term of the Ottoman Parliament. Parliament met on 28 January 1920 and published their decisions on 12 February 1920.

The Ottoman Minister of Internal Affairs, Damat Ferid Pasha, made the opening speech of parliament due to Sultan Mehmed VI's illness. A group of parliamentarians called Felâh-ı Vatan was established by Mustafa Kemal Pasha's friends to acknowledge the decisions taken at the Erzurum Congress and the Sivas Congress. Mustafa Kemal said:

It is the nation's iron fist that writes the Nation's Oath which is the main principle of our independence to the annals of history.

These decisions worried the occupying Allies, resulting in the Occupation of Constantinople by the British, French and Italian troops on 16 March 1920 and the establishment of a new Turkish nationalist parliament, the Grand National Assembly of Turkey, in Ankara. This also intensified the Turkish War of Independence against the Allies.

The six decisions of the Misak-ı Millî taken by the late Ottoman Parliament were later used as the basis for the claims of the Grand National Assembly in the Treaty of Kars and of the new Republic of Turkey in the Treaty of Lausanne.

== National Oath ==
1. The future of the territories inhabited by an Arab majority at the time of the signing of the Armistice of Mudros will be determined by a referendum. On the other hand, the territories which were not occupied at that time and inhabited by a Turkish majority are the homeland of the Turkish nation.
2. The status of Kars, Ardahan and Batum may be determined by a referendum.
3. The status of Western Thrace will be determined by the votes of its inhabitants.
4. The security of Constantinople and Marmara should be provided for. Transport and free trade on the Straits of the Bosphorus and the Dardanelles will be determined by Turkey and other concerned countries.
5. The rights of minorities will be issued on condition that the rights of Muslim minorities in neighboring countries are protected.
6. In order to develop in every field, the country should be independent and free; all restrictions on political, judicial and financial development will be removed.

== See also ==
- Fourteen Points
- Muhacir
- Turkish minorities in the former Ottoman Empire
- Minorities in Turkey
- Turkmeneli
- Neo-Ottomanism
- Blue Homeland
