= Sivas Congress =

Assembly of the Turkish National Movement

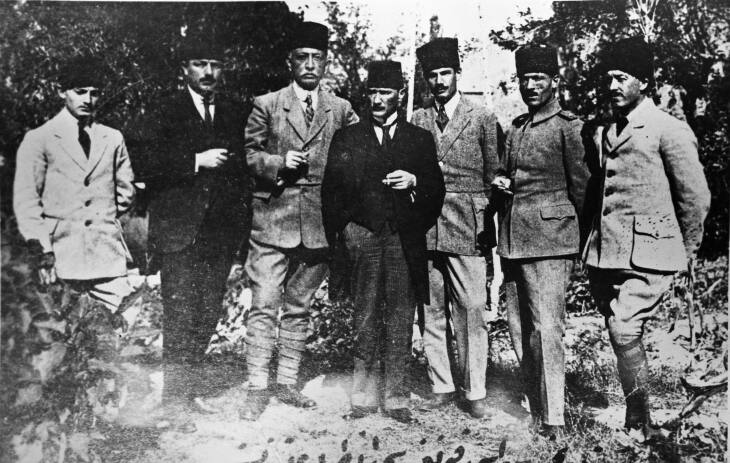
Prominent nationalists at the Sivas Congress. Left to right: Muzaffer Kılıç, Rauf (Orbay), Bekir Sami (Kunduh), Mustafa Kemal (Atatürk), Ruşen Eşref Ünaydın, Cemil Cahit (Toydemir), Cevat Abbas (Gürer)

The Sivas Congress (Turkish: Sivas Kongresi) was an assembly of the Turkish National Movement held for one week from 4 to 11 September 1919 in the city of Sivas, in central-eastern Turkey, which united delegates from all Anatolian provinces of the Ottoman Empire, defunct at the time in practical terms. At the time of the convention, the state capital (Constantinople) as well as many provincial cities and regions were under occupation by the Allied powers preparing for the partition of the Ottoman Empire. This was part of the wider conflict of the Turkish War of Independence.

== Resolutions ==
The call for the congress had been issued by Mustafa Kemal Atatürk with his Amasya Circular three months before and the preparatory work had been handled during the Erzurum Congress. The congress at Sivas took a number of vital decisions which were foundational in shaping the future policy to be conducted in the frame of the Turkish War of Independence. The Congress also united the multiple regional Defense of Rights Associations into the Association of the Defence of Rights of Anatolia and Rumelia.

The following resolutions were passed:

1. The parts of the Ottoman State, which are within our borders on October 30, 1918, when the Armistice of Mudros was signed between the Ottoman State and the Allied Powers, and which have a very large Muslim majority in every point, are an indivisible and inseparable whole from each other and the Ottoman community. All Muslim peoples living in this country are true brothers, full of mutual respect and self-sacrifice, respectful of each other's racial and social rights, and fully observant of the conditions of the environment they live in.
2. It is essential to make the National Forces effective and the national will dominant for the integrity of the Ottoman society, the establishment of our national independence, and the inviolability of the supreme authority of the Caliphate and Sultanate.
3. Against any intervention or occupation against any part of the Ottoman lands and especially against movements aimed at establishing independent Greek and Armenian communities within our homeland, the principle of joint defense and resistance has been accepted as legitimate, as in the national struggles on the Aydın, Manisa and Balıkesir Fronts.
4. Since all rights of all non-Muslim minorities with whom we have always lived together in the same homeland are completely protected, it will not be acceptable to grant privileges that will disrupt our political sovereignty and social balance to these minorities.
5. If the Ottoman Government is forced to abandon or neglect any part of our country in the face of external pressure, all kinds of measures and decisions [must be] taken by the Caliphate and Sultanate to ensure the inviolability and integrity of the homeland and the nation.
6. We expect the Allied Powers to abandon the idea of dividing the homelands that constitute a [united] whole and where the majority of Muslims reside within our borders as of October 30, 1918 when the Armistice Agreement was signed, and to respect our historical, racial, religious and geographical rights on these lands and to put an end to attempts contrary to this, and thus to make a decision based on truth and justice.
7. Our nation exalts humanitarian, contemporary goals and appreciates our technical, industrial and economic situation and needs. Thus, on condition that the internal and external independence of our state and nation and the integrity of our homeland are preserved, we welcome with pleasure the technical, industrial and economic assistance of any state that respects the principles of nationality and does not have a domineering intention against our country within the borders written in Article 6 [of the armistice terms]. The realization of these just and humane conditions, the urgent decision to conclude a peace, and the welfare of humanity and the well-being of the world are our most sincere national aspirations.
8. In this historical period when nations determine their own future, it is essential that the Istanbul Government also be loyal to the national will. Because just as the nation does not bow to the arbitrary decisions of any government that is not based on the national will, it has been revealed by the events and results that have passed so far that such decisions are not and cannot be valid abroad. Thus, without the nation having to resort to the means of relieving itself from the distress and anxiety it is experiencing, it is imperative that the Istanbul Government convene a national assembly immediately and without wasting any time, and thus submit all decisions that the nation will make regarding the future of the country to the control of the national assembly.
9. The general committee formed by the union of patriotic and national societies that emerged from the national conscience with the oppression and suffering that our homeland and nation were subjected to, and all with the same purpose and aim, this time took the name of the “Anatolia and Rumelia Defense of Rights Society”. This society is free from all kinds of partisanship and personal ambitions and is purified.
10. All our Muslim citizens are natural members of this Society. A Representative Committee was elected by the General Congress of the Anatolian and Rumelian Defense of Rights Society, which convened in Sivas on September 4, 1919, to pursue the sacred cause and manage the general organization, and all national organizations from villages to provincial centers were reinforced and united.

== Aftermath ==
Although smaller than the Erzurum Congress (with 38 delegates), the delegates came from a wider geographical area than was the case with the Erzurum Congress. Along with the Erzurum Congress, the Sivas Congress determined the main points of the Misak-ı Millî (National Pact) that the Turkish National Movement made with other Turkish resistance movements against the Allies to work together, namely the imperial government in Constantinople. The two bodies signed the Amasya Protocol the next month on 22 October 1919, calling for new elections after which the Ottoman Chamber of Deputies would consider the agreements of the Sivas Congress. Once word reached the occupying Allies in Constantinople, however, they dissolved the parliament, after which the remaining vestiges of the Ottoman imperial government would become antagonistic towards the Turkish National Movement based in Ankara.

== Legacy ==
After the war of independence, The Association of the Defence of Rights of Anatolia and Rumelia would become a formal political party and rename themselves the Republican People's Party (CHP.) They retroactively declared the Sivas Congress their first Congress. The CHP is one of Turkey's major political parties to this day.

The building where the Sivas Congress took place was acquired by the Ministry of Culture in 1984 at the request of President Kenan Evren. It has since been open to the public as the Sivas Congress and Ethnography Museum.
