= Amasya Circular =

Pamphlet issued by Mustafa Kemal Atatürk

Original text of the Amasya Circular

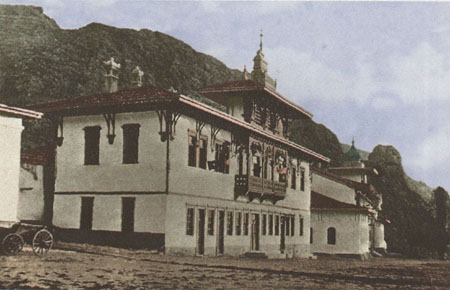
Saraydüzü Casern in Amasya (currently undergoing reconstruction) where Amasya Circular was prepared and telegraphed across Turkey

Amasya Circular (Turkish: Amasya Genelgesi or Amasya Tamimi) was a joint circular issued on 22 June 1919 in Amasya, Sivas Vilayet by Fahri Yaver-i Hazret-i Şehriyari ("Honorary Aide-de-camp to His Majesty Sultan") Mirliva Mustafa Kemal Atatürk (Inspector of the Ninth Army Inspectorate), Rauf Orbay (former Naval Minister), Miralay Refet Bele (Commander of the III Corps stationed at Sivas) and Mirliva Ali Fuat Cebesoy (Commander of the XX Corps stationed at Ankara). And during the whole meeting, Ferik Cemal Mersinli (Inspector of the Second Army Inspectorate) and Mirliva Kâzım Karabekir (Commander of the XV Corps stationed at Erzurum) were consulted with telegraphs.

This circular is considered as the first written document putting the Turkish War of Independence in motion.

The circular, distributed across Anatolia, declared Turkey's independence and integrity to be in danger and called for a national conference to be held in Sivas (Sivas Congress) and before that, for a preparatory congress comprising representatives from the eastern provinces of Anatolia to be held in Erzurum in July (Erzurum Congress).

== Materials ==
1. The unity of the homeland and the independence of the Turkish nation is at great risk.
2. The government in Istanbul (the Istanbul Government) cannot fulfill the responsibilities it undertakes. Because of this situation, the Turkish nation appears as if it does not exist despite having a name.
3. The independence of the Turkish nation will be saved by the determination and decision of the nation.
4. To take into consideration the situation of the nation and its conduct, the presence of a national committee free of restraint and inspection is needed to express and announce the rights of the nation to the whole world.
5. It is decided that a Congress must promptly be held in the safest place of Anatolia at this time, Sivas.
6. For this purpose, three delegates who have won the trust of the public, as quickly as possible, need to immediately depart from their provinces' Sanjaks
7. Acknowledging that they may be faced with an unfavorable situation in this mission, delegates must hide their purposes like a national secret and hide their identities when they travel to places where it is necessary to do so.
8. A congress will be held in Erzurum in 10 July for the eastern provinces. Until that date if the other provincial delegates could also travel to Sivas, the members of the Erzurum Congress will also head to the general conference which will be held at Sivas.

== See also ==
- Amasya Protocol
- Erzurum Congress
- Sivas Congress
