= Erzurum Congress =

Congress of Turkish revolutionaries in 1919

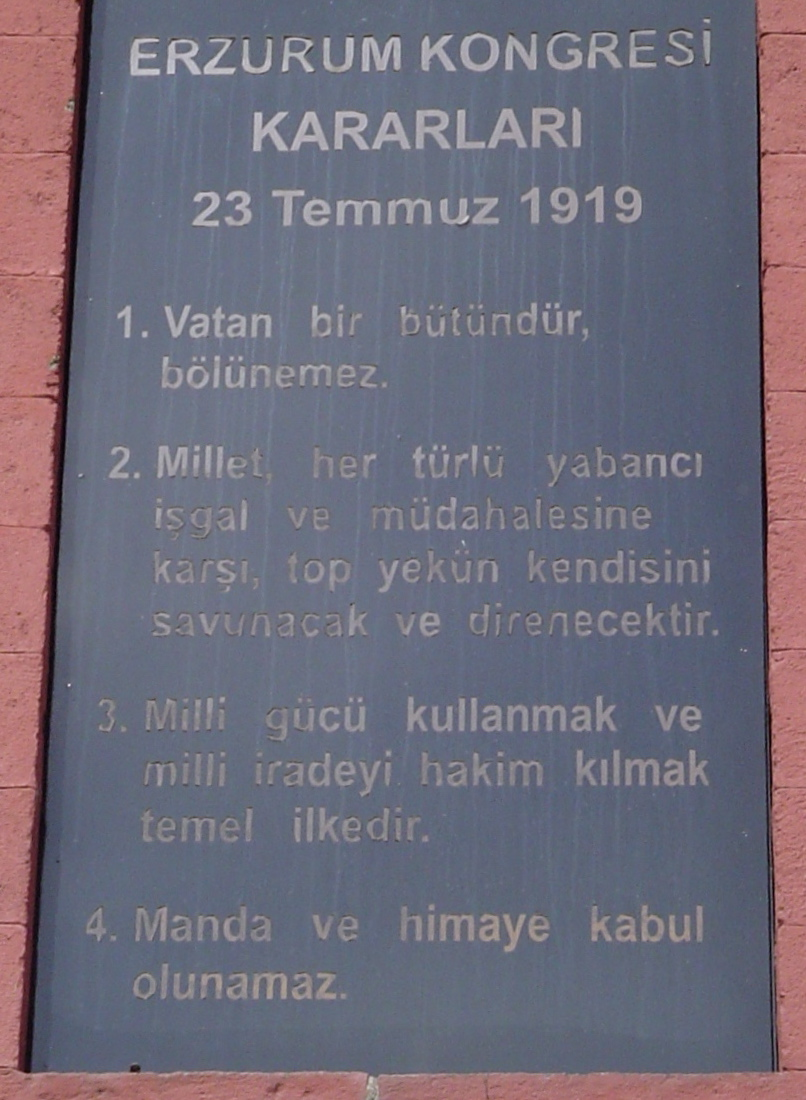
Monument in Erzurum reproducing the main resolutions of the Erzurum Congress. 1) The motherland is a whole, and cannot be divided. 2) The nation will defend itself and resist against any kind of foreign invasion and intervention. 3) The basic principle is to do everything with the power of the nation's people and to hold the people's will above all. 4) Mandate and patronage cannot be accepted.

Erzurum Congress (Turkish: Erzurum Kongresi) was an assembly of Turkish Revolutionaries held from 23 July to 4 August 1919 in the city of Erzurum, in eastern Turkey, in accordance with the previously issued Amasya Circular. The congress united delegates from six eastern provinces (vilayets) of the Ottoman Empire, many parts of which were under Allied occupation at the time.

== Background ==
=== Mudros Armistice ===
In the months leading up to the end of World War I, the Ottoman regime had undergone major restructuring. The government ministers of the Committee of Union and Progress, which ran the Ottoman government between 1913 and 1918, had resigned from office and fled the country soon afterwards. Successful Allied offensives in Salonika posed a direct threat to the Ottoman capital of Constantinople. Mehmed VI appointed Ahmed Izzet Pasha to the position of Grand Vizier and tasked him with the assignment of seeking an armistice with the Allied Powers and ending Ottoman involvement in the war. On 30 October 1918, an armistice was signed between the Ottomans, represented by the Minister of the Navy Rauf Bey, and the Allies, represented by British Admiral Somerset Gough-Calthorpe. The armistice ended Ottoman participation in the war and required the Empire's forces to stand down although there still remained approximately one million soldiers in the field and small scale fighting continued in the frontier provinces into November.

=== Allied Occupation ===
The victors of the First World War soon set about military occupation and partitioning of the Empire. The Ottoman frontier provinces in Arabia and Palestine were already under the control of the British and French. Following the signing of the armistice, Allied warships moved into the straits off the coast of Constantinople in order to secure the Dardanelles. In February 1919, French general Franchet d'Espèrey led a Greek occupation force into the city. The Anatolian province of Antalya was occupied by the Italians and the area of Cilicia and the Adana Vilayet were under the control of French forces advancing from Syria. By the end of 1918, regional resistance groups were already beginning to form called "Associations for the Defense of Rights" or Müdâfaa-i Hukuk.

=== Greek Occupation ===
The turning point in the Turkish National Movement began on 14 May 1919 when Greek occupation forces landed in the city of Smyrna in the Province of İzmir. The city of Smyrna and the surrounding area contained a sizable Greek community. Greek forces had made it clear of their intentions of a permanent annexation of the İzmir Province. Greek forces almost immediately met with fierce protest and resistance from the Turkish population, many of whom had attained small arms from local caches. News of the Greek occupation quickly spread through the Empire and fueled Turkish resentment of the Allied occupation.

=== Mustafa Kemal and the Turkish War of Independence ===
As Greek forces were trying to cement their holdings in İzmir, a young Ottoman military officer named Mustafa Kemal (later to be known as Atatürk) was headed for his assignment as Inspector of the Eastern Provinces. He was tasked with the responsibility of keeping peace and order in the provinces and overseeing the disbanding of remaining Ottoman regiments. On 19 May, Kemal arrived at the Black Sea port city of Samsun. In defiance of Ottoman orders, Kemal began to organize a nationalist Turkish resistance movement, completely separated from the Ottoman regime in Constantinople, with the intent to defend the territories of Anatolia from intrusion of the foreign powers. On 28 June, the British Assistant High Commissioner in Constantinople, Rear Admiral Richard Webb wrote a statement to Sir Richard Graham on the state of the Turkish resistance in the eastern Empire and the blossoming Greco-Turkish conflict.

It has now become most serious, and of course it all dates back to the time of the occupation of Smyrna by the Greek troops...Up to the time of the Smyrna landing we were getting on quite well. The Turk was, of course somewhat troublesome, but we were gradually getting the bad Valis, Mutesssarifs, &c, removed, and I think we could have got along very well without any big trouble until the peace...But now things are quite changed. Greeks and Turks are killing one another wholesale in the Aydin Vilayet. Mustapha Kemal is busy round Samsoun, and so far refuses to come to heel. Raouf Bey and one or two others are getting very busydown Panderma way, and there are symptoms which seem to point to the Ministry of War here at Constantinople being the organizing center of the disturbances.

— Richard Webb, Documents on British Foreign Policy, iv, no. 433, Webb to Sir R. Graham, 28 June 1919

=== Meeting at Amasya ===
In June 1919, Kemal held a secret meeting with several prominent Turkish statesman and military leaders including Ali Fuat Pasha and Hüseyin Rauf (Rauf Orbay) in the town of Amasya. The Amasya meeting kept in remote communication with Turkish General Kâzım Karabekir Pasha who was in command of the 15th Army Corps stationed at Erzurum at the time. The meeting set forth the ideological groundwork for the future Turkish National Movement and subsequent Congress of Erzurum. Following the meeting at Amasya, Kemal issued a telegram to many Turkish civil and military figures laying out the ideas expressed by the Turkish nationalists at Amasya. Below is the opening statement of the so-called Amasya Circular

1. The integrity of the country, the independence of the nation are in danger.
2. The central government is unable to discharge the duties for which it is responsible. As a result, the nation is regarded as nonexistent.
3. Only the will and resolution of the nation can save the independence of the nation.

Meanwhile, General Kâzım Karabekir began issuing invitations for a gathering of Turkish Eastern Anatolian delegates to be held in the city of Erzurum. Kemal continued to Erzurum to begin the task of setting up the meeting of Turkish delegates. In order to avoid any charges of treason or rebellion against the still legitimate Ottoman Sultanate, Kemal resigned from his post. To maintain a semblance of legality, Kemal gained the support of the Association for the Defence of the Rights of Eastern Anatolia, a Defence of Rights Association which was founded in Erzurum in March 1919 and was legally registered and recognized by the vilayet of Erzurum.

== Proceedings ==
On 23 July 1919, a congress of fifty-six delegates from the vilayets of Bitlis, Erzurum, Sivas, Trabzon and Van gathered in Erzurum for the assembly called by Mustafa Kemal and Kâzım Karabekir. On the first day of the proceedings, which was the anniversary of the Young Turk Revolution, the delegates elected Mustafa Kemal as chairman of the congress. The congress made a number of important decisions that were to shape the future conduct of the Turkish War of Independence. Namely, it reaffirmed the provinces' desires to remain within the Ottoman Empire (rather than be partitioned by the Allies); refused to accept any mandate scheme for the empire nor accord Christian elements such as Greeks or Armenians with any special privileges; and resolved to resist any such measures, should they try to be implemented. The congress managed to draft the first version of the Misak-ı Millî or National Pact. Before dispersing on 17 August, the congress elected members for a "representative committee" (heyet-i temsiliye), with Kemal as its head.

While the congress was in session, General Kâzım Karabekir was issued a direct order from the Sultanate to place Kemal and Rauf under arrest and assume Kemal's position as Inspector-General of the Eastern Provinces. He defied the government in Constantinople and refused to carry out the arrest.

The conference was held in the building which once housed the Sanasarian College, a prestigious school and erstwhile regional center of Armenian culture and education in the years preceding the Armenian genocide.

== Resolutions ==
The language of the resolutions was as follows:

- The territorial integrity and indivisibility of the homeland must be protected. (Manifesto Art. 6: section regarding Regulations Article 3, Article i of the Regulations and the Manifesto)
- The nation would resist foreign occupation and inference. (Articles 2 and 3 of the Regulations; Articles 3 of the Manifesto.)
- A provisional government would be formed if the government in Constantinople is incapable of maintaining the nation's independence and unity. (Regulations Article 4; Manifesto Article 4.)
- The aim is to consolidate the national forces into a ruling factor and to establish the will of the nation as the sovereign power. (Article 3 of the Manifesto.)
- The nation shall not accept the status of a mandate or a protectorate. (Manifesto Article 7.)

== Impact ==
The Erzurum Congress was followed by a congress at Sivas attended by delegates from all over the Empire. The Sivas Congress applied the ideas presented at the Erzurum Congress to the whole of Anatolia and Rumelia. The Association for the Defence of the Rights of Eastern Anatolia was changed to the Association for the Defence of the Rights of Anatolia and Rumelia. The Erzurum Congress was the first gathering of Turkish delegates during the Turkish War of Independence which led to the abolition of the Ottoman Sultanate. Although the Sivas congress expressed support for the Sultan, they made it clear that they believed the government and Grand Vezir in Constantinople was incapable of protecting the rights and territory of the Empire's Turkish citizens. It set the tone of the conflict as one of Turkish nationalism and played a part in defining a new Turkish national identity for the emerging Republic of Turkey.

== See also ==
- Turkish revolutionaries
- Turkish national movement
- Turkish War of Independence
- Establishment of the Turkish national movement
- Chronology of the Turkish War of Independence
- Amasya Circular
- Sivas Congress
