= Buruciye Medrese =

Madrasa in Sivas, Turkey

- Buruciye Medresesi
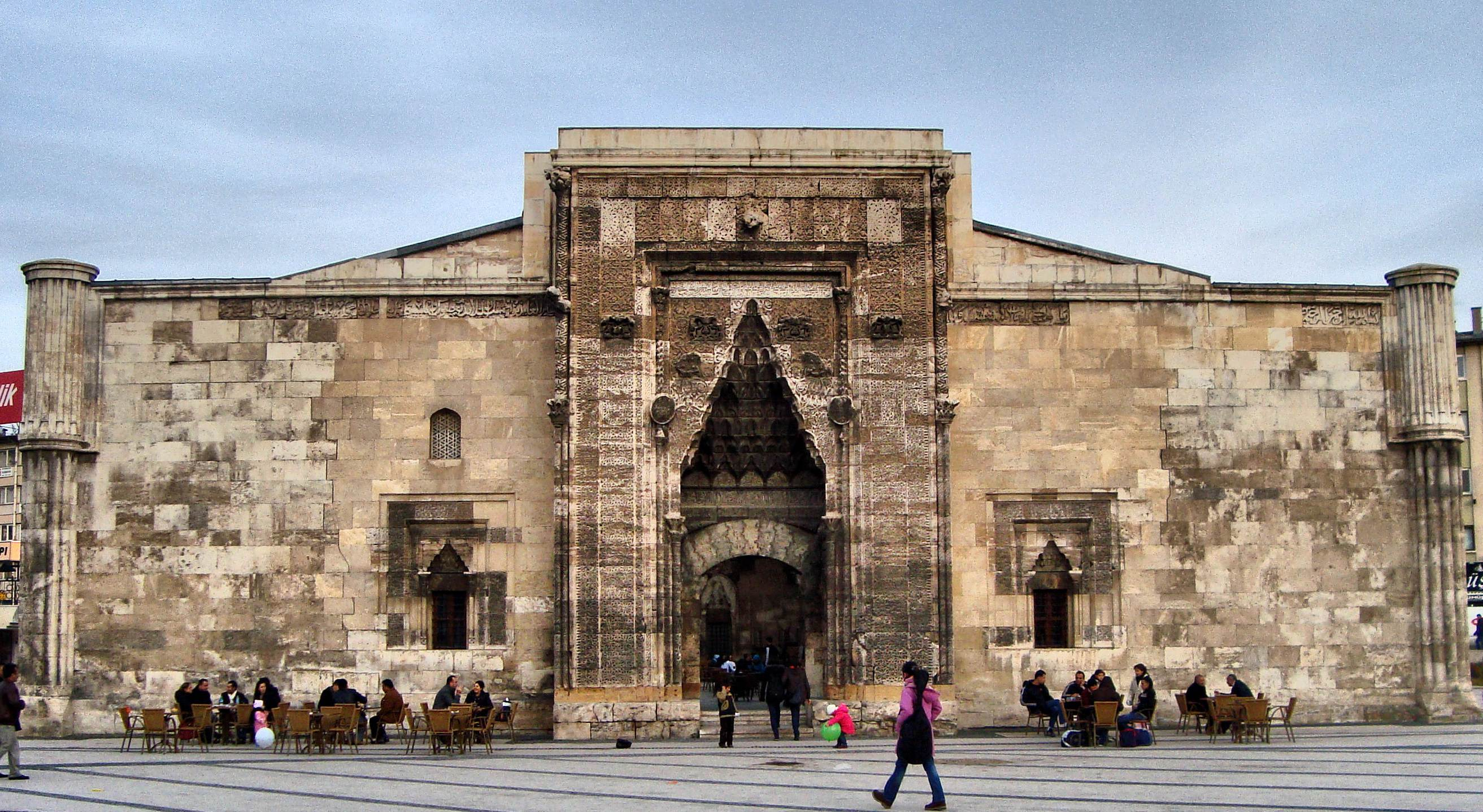

- Location within Turkey

General information
- Architectural style: Seljuk
- Location: Eskikale neighborhood, Merkez district, Kent Meydanı, Sivas, Sivas, Turkey
- Coordinates: 39°44′56.7″N 37°00′55.3″E
- Completed: 1271; 755 years ago
- Renovated: 1960–1968, 2005
- Owner: Directorate General of Foundations

Technical details
- Material: ashlar, rubble masonry and brick

Buruciye Medrese or Buruciye Madrasah (Turkish: Buruciye Medresesi) is a former medrese, in Sivas, Turkey. It was built during the reign of Seljuk sultan Gıyaseddin Keyhüsrev III in 1271.

== Location ==
Buruciye Medrese is at Kent Meydanı ("City Square") in the Eskikale neighborhood of Merkez ("Central") district in Sivas. The main entrance is from the west. Taken into account that there are two big medreses, Çifte Minareli Medrese and Şifaiye Medrese, in the vicinity, it is assumed that the location of the Buruci Medrese was a cultural center of Sivas.

== History ==
The medrese was built in 1271 (AH 670) during the reign of Seljuk sultan Gıyaseddin Keyhüsrev III (r. 1265–1284) for education in the fields of physics, chemistry and astronomy by Muzaffer Burucerdi, who originated from Borujerd close to Hamadan in western Iran. The tomb of the endower, who is named as "Muzaffer bin İbâdullah el-Mufaddal el-Burûcirdî", is situated in a section of the medrese .

== Architecture ==
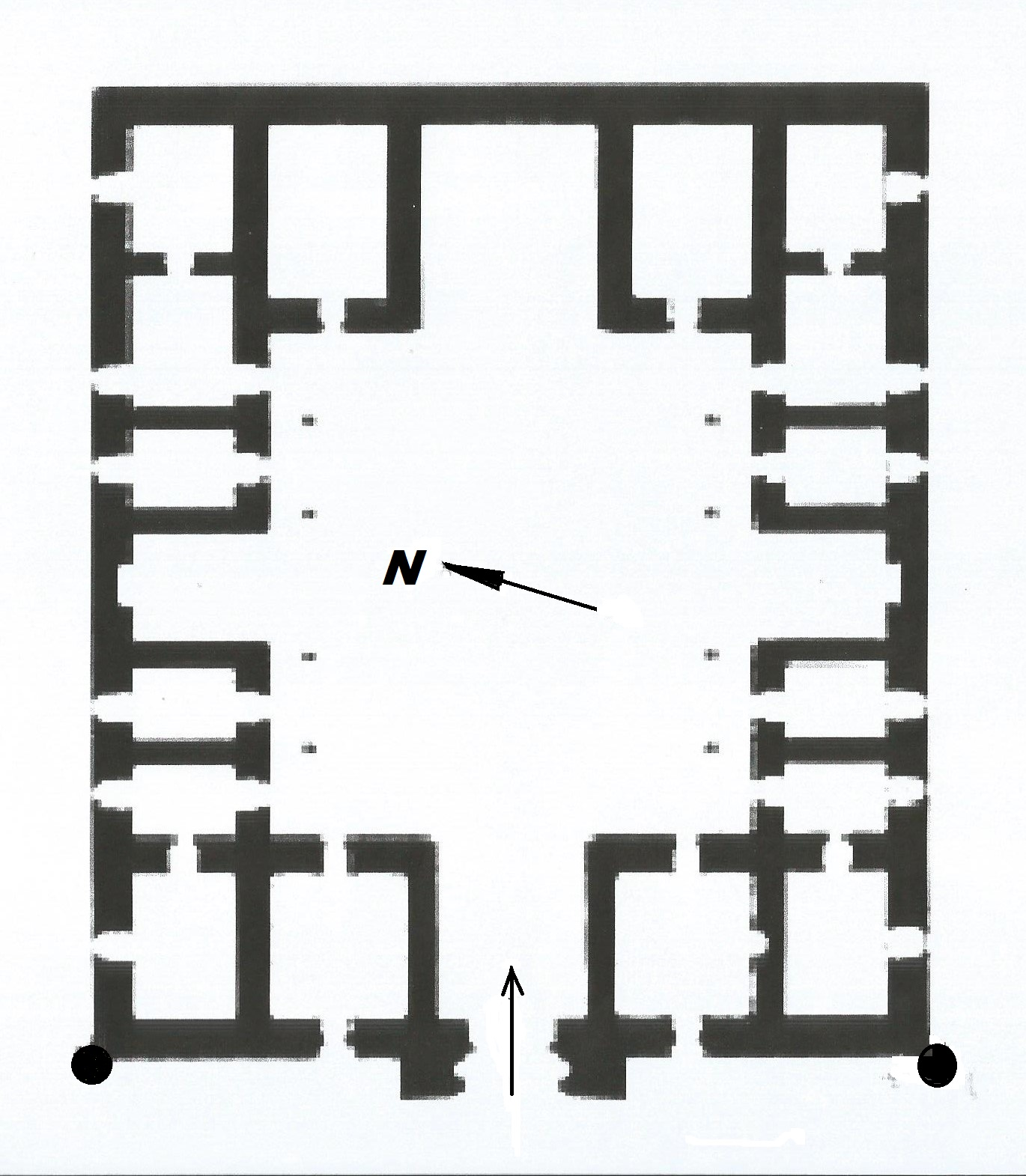
Plan of Buruciye Medrese.

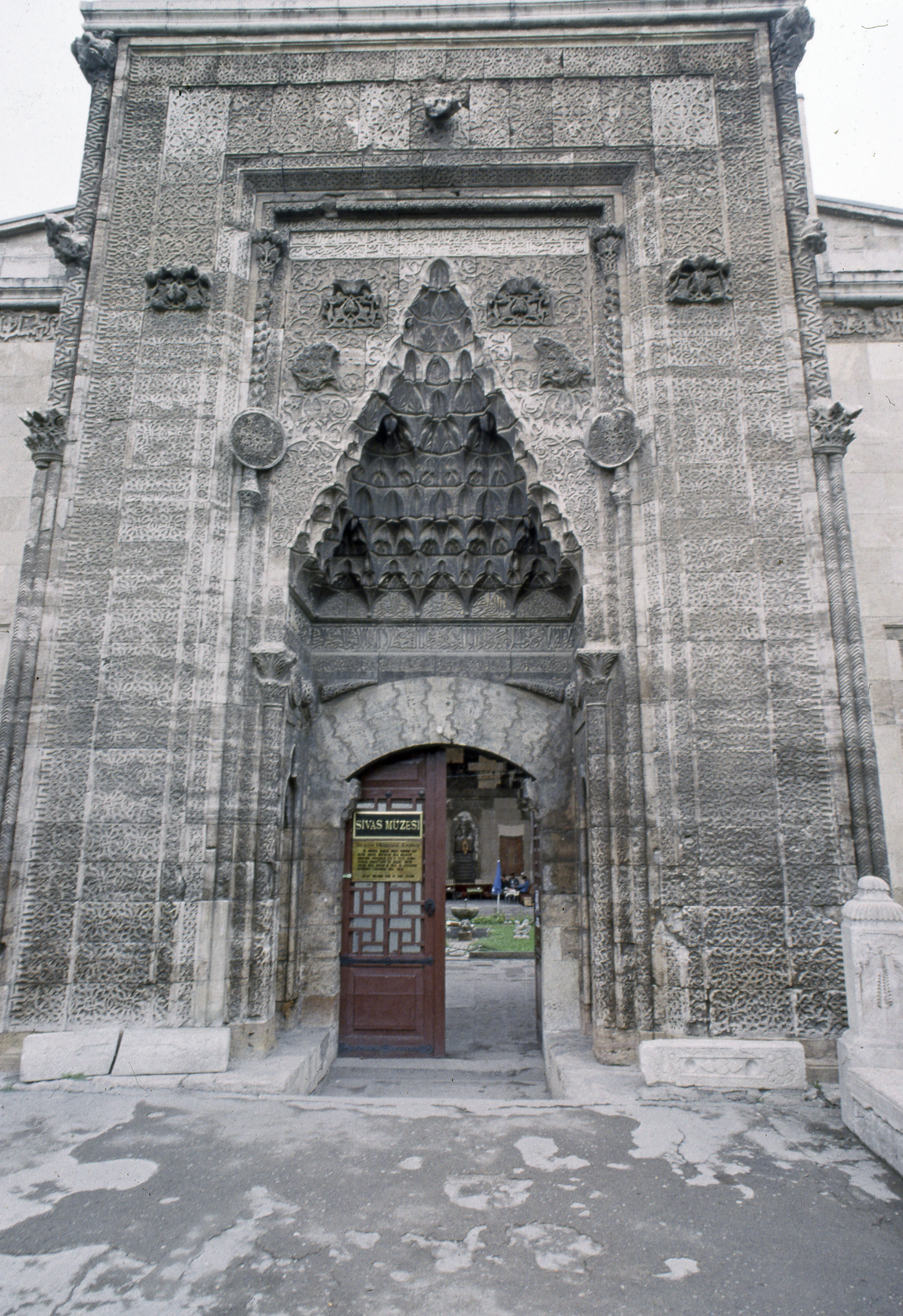
Portal of the medrese.

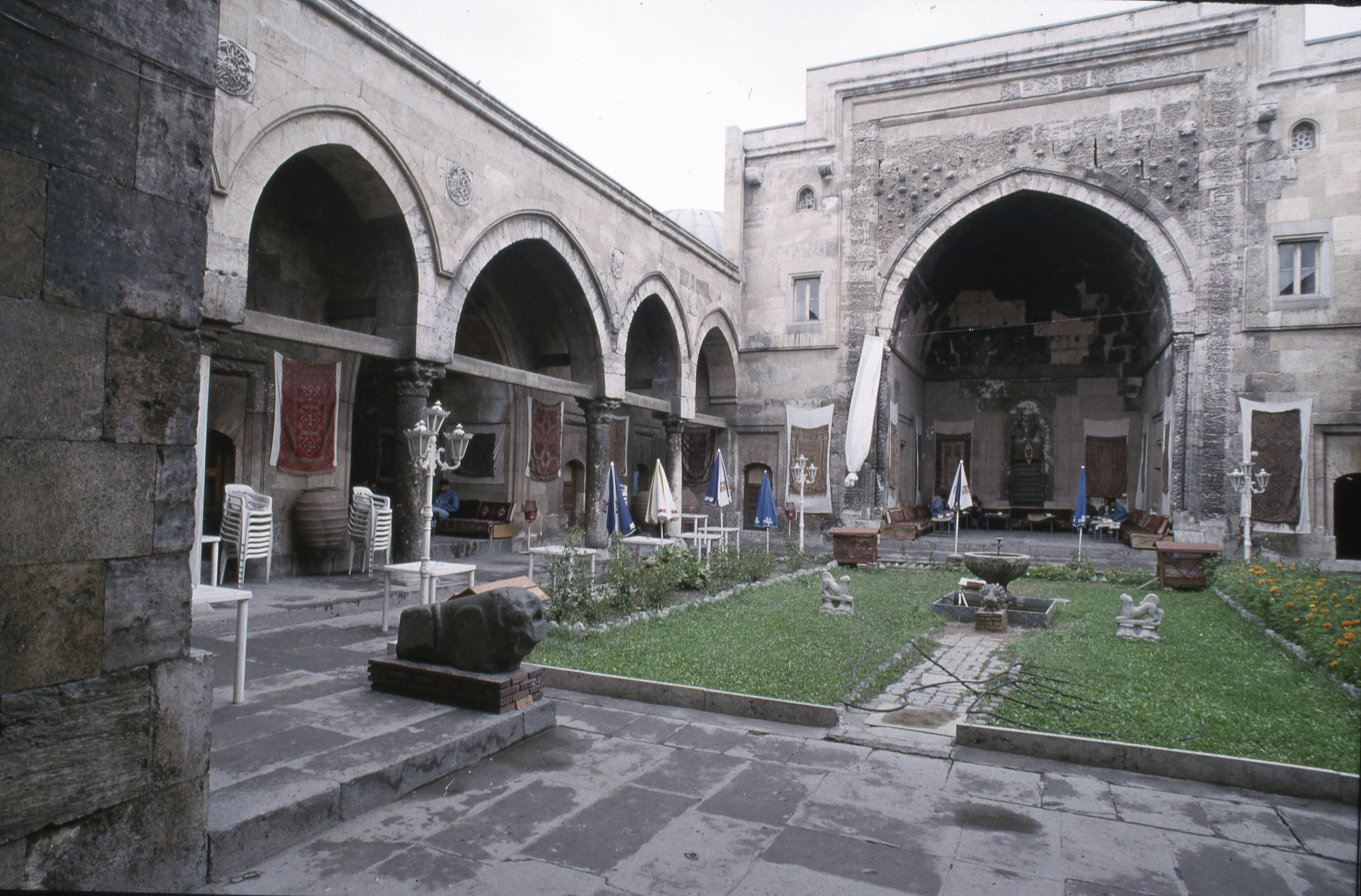
A view from the courtyard.

The architect of the medrese building is not known. The building is designed in the form of old Turkic medreses in Central Asia. It has a near-quadrat plan. Its architecture has the most regular symmetry among the medreses in Anatolia. It is constructed in a ground floor and aa mezzanine, with four iwans around an open courtyard. The main facade wall is built in ashlar. The side walls are of partly ashlar and rubble masonry, while the backside wall is also of rubble masonry. Also bricks gathered are used in the building. The building's walls are 115–150 cm (45–59 in) thick depending on their position. The main iwan, which resembles a lacework with the patterns of its muqarnas, has the dimensions 6.50 m × 7.80 m (21.3 ft × 25.6 ft). The outflow crown gate is flanked by two muqarnas windows and two grooved towers in the corners. The portal's iwan is surrounded by inscriptions. Its mquarnas is decorated with geometric figures. The domed room behind the window at right of the main gate conyains a mihrab, and it is assumed that the room was used as a mosque. The room behind the left window in the facade is reserved for the tomb, which contains the sarcophagi of the endower and his children. The entire walls of the tomb were initially covered with rich hexagonal tiles in blue and black. The tiles on the walls survived partly today. The endower's full name is written in an inscription belt running around at the top of the tomb room walls, just below the lines of tile-covered muqarnases.

There are porches of about 1.10 m (3 ft 7 in) width on two sides of the courtyard. The pointed arches of the porches are carried by 270 cm (110 in) high round columns of nearly 45 cm (18 in) diameter. It is assumed that the columns were gathered for reuse because some of the column capitals are of Corinthian order, some of them bear Byzantine monograms. There are no porches at the main gate's courtyard side iwan and at the iwan across from the main gate.

There are eight cells facing the courtyard. The cells have a door opening to the courtyard, but no windows. The ceiling of the cells behind the narrow porch is in the form of barrel vault. The cells next to the portal feature staircase leading to the roof. Each of the staircases situated at both sides of the main gate's iwan lead to the separate mezzarine rooms with windows.

Buruciye Medrese is considered "one of the best examples of the Seljuk architecture in Anatolia having the most harmonious and completeness with its architectural elements and ornaments. "

== Restoration and current use ==
After the 1920s, in the Republican era, the medreses' function was abolished in Turkey. The Buruciye Medrese remained vacant for many years, and ruined partly, including the completely destruction of its mezzanine.

In the beginning, the Ministry of National Education was responsible for the maintenance and restoration of the medreses. After the transfer of this duty to the Ministry of Culture in 1957, the restoration of the Bucuriye Medrese, which began already in 1956, continued between 1960 and 1968. It was completely restored, and the mezzanine was reconstructed. In 2005, repair works carried out including floor reinforcement and drainage system improvement, electrical installation, covering of the domes with lead sheets, stone flooring and repair of demolished rubble masonry.

The medrese is owned by the Directorate General of Foundations. In 2015, it was allocated to the Mufti of Sivas. It is used for diverse religious educational and cultural activities, such as Quran, Arabic, Ottoman Turkish, Tafsir, Hadith, Islamic calligraphy, paper marbling, illuminated manuscript and blowing the ney . The facility hosts also two reading rooms, and a handicraft arts center. In the tomb, Qur'an reading is performed daily by a different religious official, and the sound is transmitted to the entire medrese audible by visitors. Religious guidance and counseling service is provided during working hours on weekdays. Visitors can receive a cup of tea free of charge.

== World Cultural Heritage Site ==
The Buruciye Medrese was nominated as a World Heritage Site on 15 April 2014. It is placed on the tentative list of the United Nations Educational, Scientific and Cultural Organization (UNESCO).
