= List of people from Sivas =

This is a list of notable people from Sivas, Turkey.

(in alphabetical order)

- Pir Sultan Abdal - Alevi poet
- Nebahat Albayrak - Dutch politician and former state secretary in the Netherlands government
- Hatice Aslan - actress
- Nuri Aslan - politician, acting mayor of Istanbul
- Ahmet Ayık - world and Olympic champion wrestler
- Selda Bagcan - musician
- Mustafa Balel - short story writer and novelist
- Saint Blaise - Armenian saint, bishop of Sebaste
- Mustafa Çağrıcı - Islamic theologian
- Harutyun Kalents - Armenian artist
- Erdal Keser - footballer
- Refik Koraltan - politician, speaker of the Grand National Assembly
- Hasan Hüseyin Korkmazgil - poet
- Mekhitar of Sebastia - founder of the Mekhitarist Order of Armenian Catholic monks
- Murad of Sebastia - Armenian fedayee leader
- Tülin Şahin - model and presenter
- Aşık Veysel Şatıroğlu - poet of the Turkish folk literature
- Torkom Saraydarian - Armenian spiritual teacher, author, composer born in Sivas, 1917
- Emel Sayın - singer of Turkish classical music
- Abdüllatif Şener - politician, Deputy Prime Minister and state minister
- Mikail Nersès Sétian - Armenian Catholic bishop in the United States
- Nurettin Sözen - politician, former mayor of Istanbul
- Çetin Tekindor - actor
- Yasin Temel - neurosurgeon
- İbrahim Toraman - football player
- Ali Turan - politician representing Sivas
- Ukhtanes of Sebastia - Armenian historian and prelate
- Taniel Varouzhan - Armenian poet
- Muhsin Yazıcıoğlu - politician who was the president of the BBP party
- Cem Yılmaz - stand-up comedian, actor, cartoonist and screenwriter
- Hakan Yılmaz - weightlifter
- İsmet Yılmaz - politician representing Sivas
- İsmail YK - musician
- Sarkis Zabunyan - Armenian conceptual artist
