= Çifte Minareli Medrese =

Çifte Minareli Medrese may refer to:

- Çifte Minareli Medrese (Erzurum), an architectural monument
- Çifte Minareli Medrese (Sivas), a former medrese
