= Porsuk, Sivas =

Village in Sivas Province, Turkey

Porsuk
- Village
- Location within Turkey Location within Turkey Central Anatolia
- Coordinates: 39°53′N 36°56′E
- Country: Turkey
- Province: Sivas
- District: Sivas
- Population (2022): 140
- Time zone: UTC+3 (TRT)

Porsuk is a village in the Sivas District, in Sivas Province, Turkey. Its population is 140 (2022).
