= Bent Bridge =

Bent Bridge Eğri Köprü
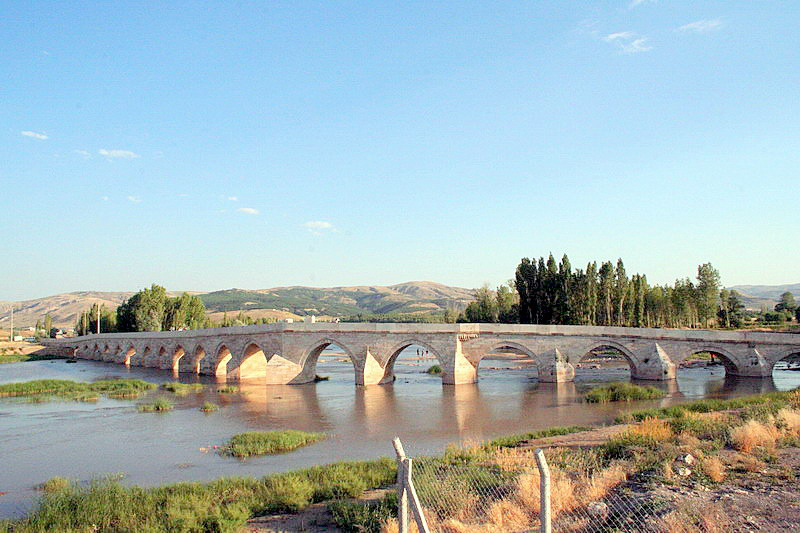
- The Bent Bridge seen from upstream. The bend is between the 6th and 7th arches from the right.
- Coordinates: 39°43′34.8″N 37°02′28″E
- Crosses: Kızılırmak
- Locale: Sivas, Central Anatolia Region, Turkey
- Other name(s): Curved Bridge

Characteristics
- Design: Arch bridge
- Material: Stone masonry
- Total length: 179.60 m (589.2 ft)
- Width: 4.55 m (14.9 ft)
- No. of spans: 18

History
- Construction end: 1174–1243 ?

Statistics
- Daily traffic: pedestrian (formerly vehicles)

The Bent Bridge or Curved Bridge (Turkish: Eğri Köprü) is a stone arch bridge over the Kızılırmak River 3 km (1.9 mi) southeast of the center of Sivas in Central Anatolia, Turkey. The bridge lies in the city's Kardeşler ward, on the road from Sivas to Malatya and onward to Syria and Mesopotamia.

Historian Thomas Alexander Sinclair says the bridge was originally built in medieval times, probably by the Seljuk Sultanate of Rum and extensively rebuilt in the late-Ottoman period.

The Bent Bridge consists of 18 stone arches and is 179.60 m (589.2 ft) long and 4.55 m (14.9 ft) wide. Traveling from Sivas, the bridge rises from the northern bank of the river and runs almost easterly for 60 m (200 ft) across the first six arches. At that point the deck turns 45 degrees to descend southeast for 120 m (390 ft) across the remaining 12 arches, the gradient over the final three arches being much steeper. Sinclair relates that one reason to build a bridge with a convex angle towards the river flow may have been to resist the pressure of ice in winter.

All the arches are pointed and most are the same width, except for three especially wide ones. The upstream piers all have stone cutwaters. The parapet has a thick moulding on the outside and is built with holes to allow water to flow off the roadway. Sinclair detects spolia (reused stonework) from the Classical and Anatolian Seljuk periods in the construction of the current bridge. He interprets this as likely to indicate that the original bridge was built by the Seljuks and included some material from an earlier building of the Classical era. The current bridge was then rebuilt using material from the Seljuk bridge. Assuming the bridge was constructed by the Seljuks, that would date it to a 69-year period between the conquest of Sivas by the Seljuk Sultan Kilij Arslan II in 1174, and the city's capture by the Ilkhanid Mongol commander Baiju, following the Battle of Köse Dağ on 26 June 1243.

The bridge is known to have been repaired in 1585 during the reign of Sultan Murad III. A construction inventory held in the Sivas Congress and Ethnography Museum also notes that the bridge was repaired in AH 1217 (1802/1803), and other records point to 19th-century repairs under the patronage of Sivas Governor Halil Rifat Pasha and at the direction of the agha of Kangal, Abdurrahman Pasha. Halil Rifat Pasha was vali of Sivas from 1882 to 1885.

The Turkish Ministry of Culture and Tourism added the bridge to its national inventory of cultural heritage on 21 January 1983. It was restored by the 16th Region of the Highways Directorate in 2006, as a result of which the stone appears unusually pale and new. Since the construction of a modern road bridge about 50 m (160 ft) upstream, the Bent Bridge is open only to pedestrian traffic.

== Sources ==
- Sinclair, T.A. (1989), Eastern Turkey: An Architectural and Archaeological Survey, vol. 2, Pindar Press, ISBN 0907132340
- "Eğri Köprü: Sivas Kültür Envanteri" [Sivas Cultural Inventory] (in Turkish). Sivas İl Kültür ve Turizm Müdürlüğü.
