= Yasin Temel =

Dutch researcher (born 1977)

Professor Yasin Temel (born 2 July 1977 in Sivas, Turkey) is a neurosurgeon with a strong interest in neuroscience.

== Early life ==
Yasin Temel did his primary school at the Minister Calsschool (Almelo, The Netherlands) He went to secondary school at the Philips van Horne Scholengemeenschap (Weert, The Netherlands). In 1995, he started with Medicine at Maastricht University (Maastricht, The Netherlands) and graduated with designation in 2001.

== Career ==
After receiving his Medical degree, Yasin Temel combined his training in Neurosurgery with his PhD training at Maastricht University Medical Center from 2001 to 2010. In this period he obtained his PhD cum laude from the faculty of Medicine of Maastricht University on 2 February 2007. In 2012 he was appointed as Professor of Neurosurgery. He was the youngest professor of Maastricht University. The main clinical activities of Temel are in the field of Functional and Stereotactic Neurosurgery and Skull Base surgery. His research is related to these areas of Neuroscience.

For his scientific work, he has received several personal awards including the Science award of the Dutch brain foundation in 2011 and the JCI’s Ten Outstanding Young Persons special Award in 2011.

== Interests ==
The main scope of Temel’s research is understanding the mechanisms of brain disease and developing therapies.
