= Sivas District =

District of Sivas Province, Turkey

- District
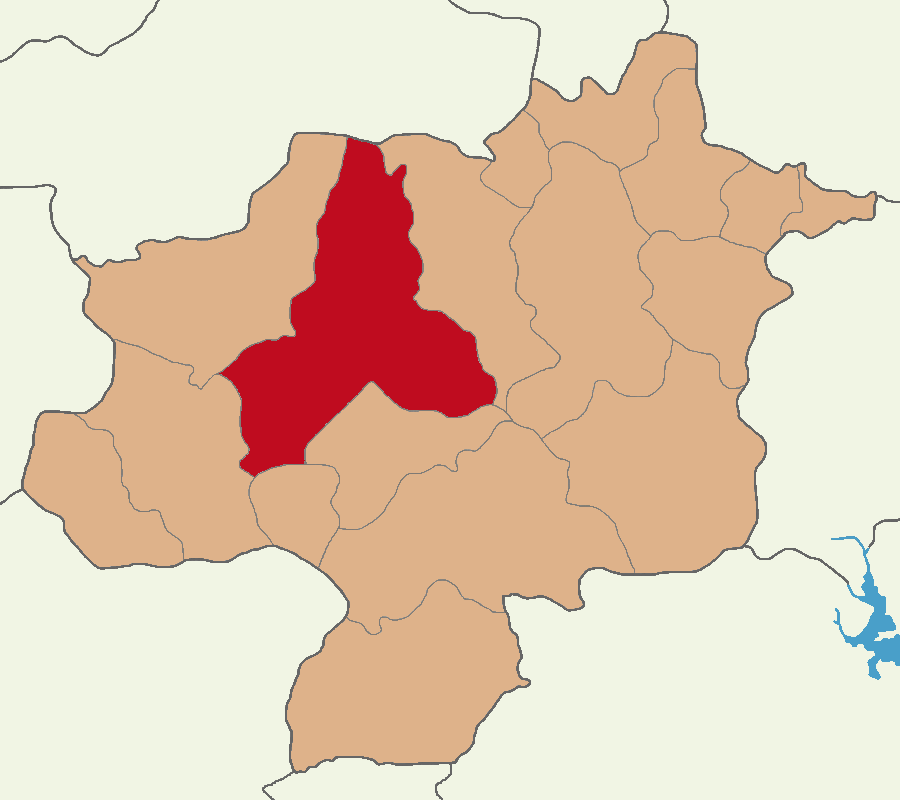
- Map showing Sivas District in Sivas Province

- Location in Turkey Sivas District (Turkey Central Anatolia)
- Coordinates: 39°45′N 37°01′E
- Country: Turkey
- Province: Sivas
- Seat: Sivas
- Area: 3,488 km^{2} (1,347 sq mi)
- Population (2022): 390,318
  - Density: 110/km^{2} (290/sq mi)
- Time zone: UTC+3 (TRT)

Sivas District (also: Merkez, meaning "central" in Turkish) is a district of the Sivas Province of Turkey. Its seat is the city of Sivas. Its area is 3,488 km^{2}, and its population is 390,318 (2022).

== Composition ==
There are two municipalities in Sivas District:

- Sivas
- Yıldız

There are 154 villages in Sivas District:

- Acıdere
- Acıpınar
- Ağılkaya
- Akçahan
- Akçainiş
- Akçamescit
- Akkoç
- Akkuzulu
- Akören
- Akpınar
- Alahacı
- Apa
- Armutlu
- Arpayazı
- Aşağıyıldızlı
- Asarcık
- Aydoğmuş
- Aylı
- Bademkaya
- Barcın
- Başıbüyük
- Başsöğüt
- Bedirli
- Beşpınar
- Beştepe
- Beypınarı
- Bingöl
- Bostancık
- Budaklı
- Çallı
- Çatalkaya
- Çaygören
- Çaypınar
- Çelebiler
- Çeltek
- Çerçideresi
- Çongar
- Çukurbelen
- Damılı
- Damlacık
- Demiryazı
- Dikmencik
- Doğanca
- Dörteylül
- Durdulu
- Düzova
- Ebuhan
- Eğribucak
- Emirhan
- Eskiapardı
- Eskiboğazkesen
- Eskiköy
- Gazibey
- Gaziköy
- Gözmen
- Güllüce
- Güllük
- Gülpınar
- Gümüşdere
- Gündüzköy
- Günece
- Güneli
- Güney
- Günören
- Hacıali
- Hanlı
- Harmancık
- Hasbey
- Haydarlı
- Hayırbey
- Hayranlı
- Herekli
- Hıdırnalı
- Himmetfakı
- Hocabey
- İlkindi
- İnceağa
- İnceyol
- İsmailbeyçiftliği
- İşhanı
- Kabasakal
- Kahyalı
- Karabalcık
- Karacaören
- Karaçayır
- Karagömlek
- Karalar
- Karalı
- Karamehmetoğlu
- Karapınar
- Karayün
- Kartalca
- Kavlak
- Kayadibi
- Keçili
- Kervansaray
- Kızılalan
- Kızılca
- Kızılcakışla
- Kızılkavraz
- Kızılova
- Kızılöz
- Kızkapan
- Köklüce
- Kolluca
- Körtuzla
- Koyuncu
- Kulyusuf
- Kumyurt
- Kurtlapa
- Kuşlu
- Kuzören
- Menşurlu
- Mermer
- Mescitli
- Olukman
- Onbaşılar
- Örencik
- Ovacık
- Ozmuş
- Pınarca
- Porsuk
- Şabanköy
- Şahbey
- Saklı
- Sarıdemir
- Savcun
- Serpincik
- Sivritepe
- Söğütçük
- Sorkuncuk
- Tahtakement
- Tatlıcak
- Tepeönü
- Tokuş
- Törnük
- Tutmaç
- Üçtepe
- Ulukapı
- Uzuntepe
- Yağmurluseki
- Yakupoğlan
- Yanalak
- Yaramış
- Yassıcabel
- Yavu
- Yazıbaşı
- Yeniapardı
- Yeniboğazkesen
- Yenice
- Yenikervansaray
- Yenikızılcakışla
- Yukarıyıldızlı
- Zengi
