= Yıldız, Sivas =

Yıldız
- Municipality
- Location in Turkey Yıldız (Turkey Central Anatolia)
- Coordinates: 40°04′39″N 36°54′45″E
- Country: Turkey
- Province: Sivas
- District: Sivas
- Population (2022): 1,948
- Time zone: UTC+3 (TRT)

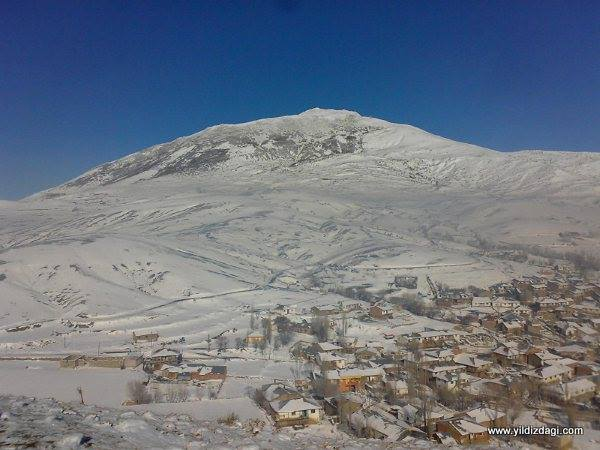
Yıldız village

Yıldız is a town (belde) in the Sivas District, Sivas Province, Turkey. Its population is 1,948 (2022).
