= Şifaiye Medrese =

Madrasa in Sivas, Turkey

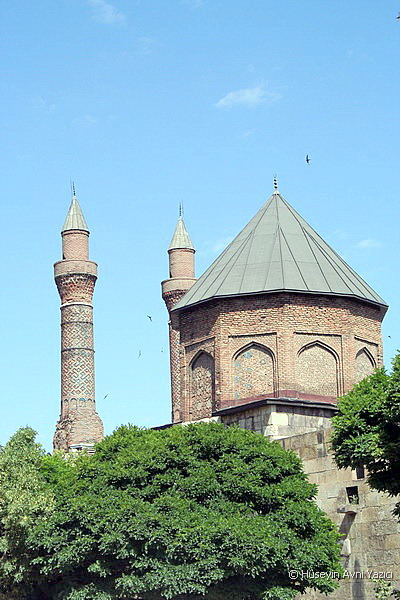

Religion
- Affiliation: Islam
- District: Sivas
- Province: Sivas
- Region: Central Anatolia

Location
- Location: Sivas, Turkey
- Interactive map of Şifaiye Medrese

Architecture
- Type: Madrasa
- Style: Seljuk
- Completed: 1217

Şifaiye Medresesi is a medrese built in 1217 in Sivas, Turkey. It bears typical Seljuk features and was built by the Rûm Seljuk Sultan Kaykaus I, who was known for his fondness for the city of Sivas where he spent the large part of his period of reign.

The complex consists of a Darüşşifa (Dâr al-Shifâ, literally "house of health", a hospital) and the medrese where medicinal studies were also taught. The complex is also alternatively called under the sultan Izeddin Keykavus I's name whose tomb is located within the compound.

== Gallery ==
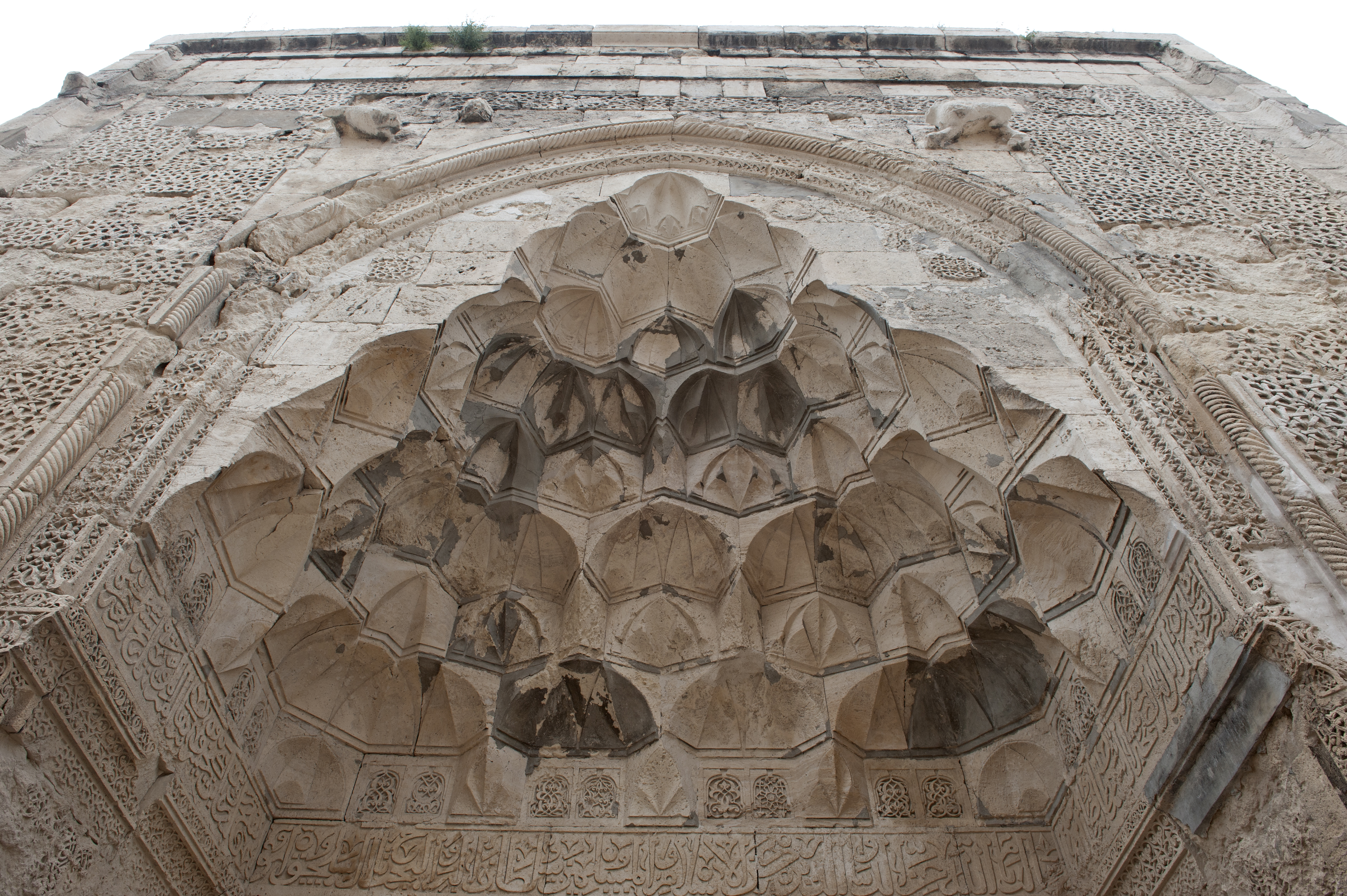
Şifaiye Medrese entrance

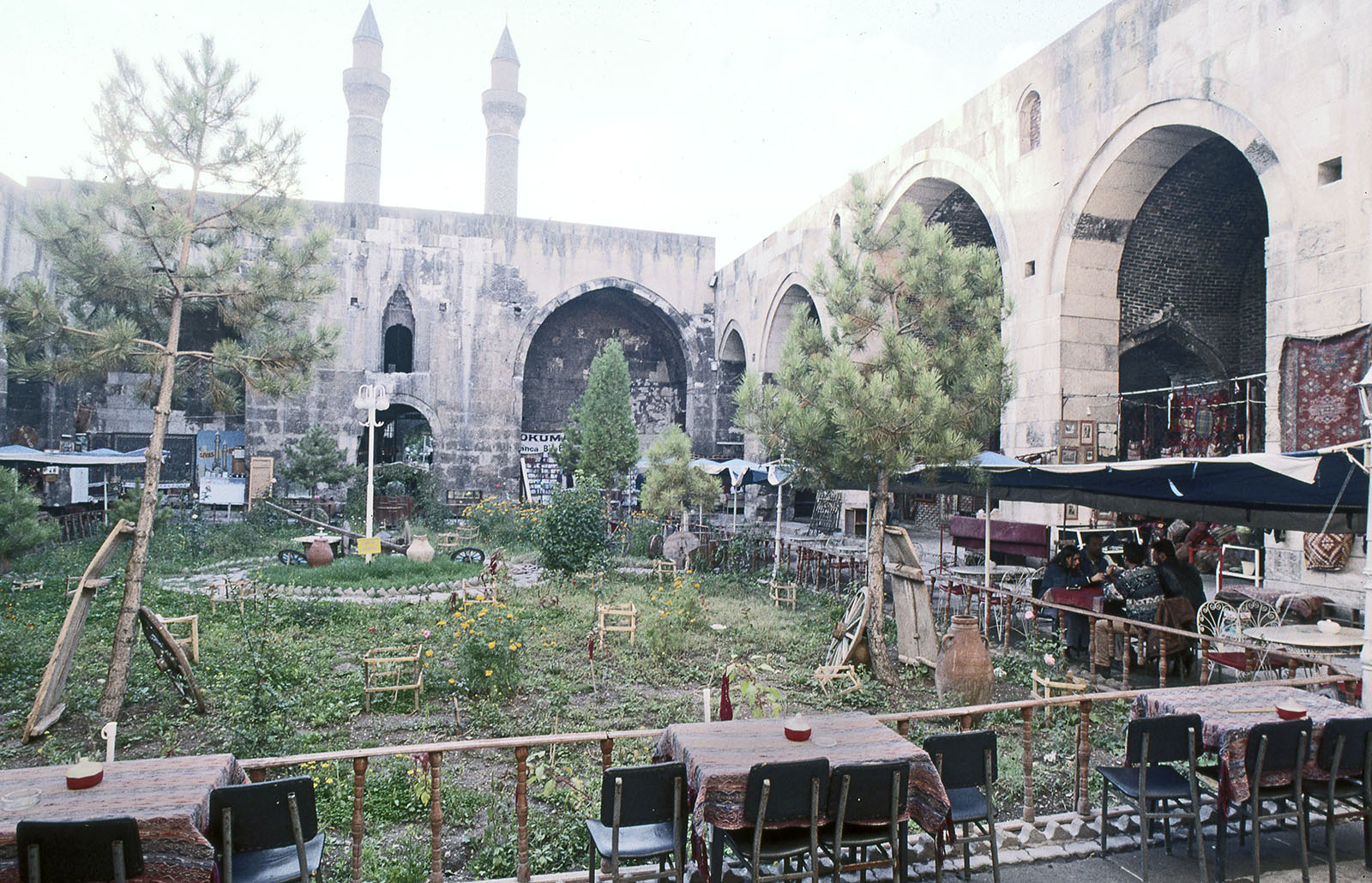
Şifaiye Medrese before restoration

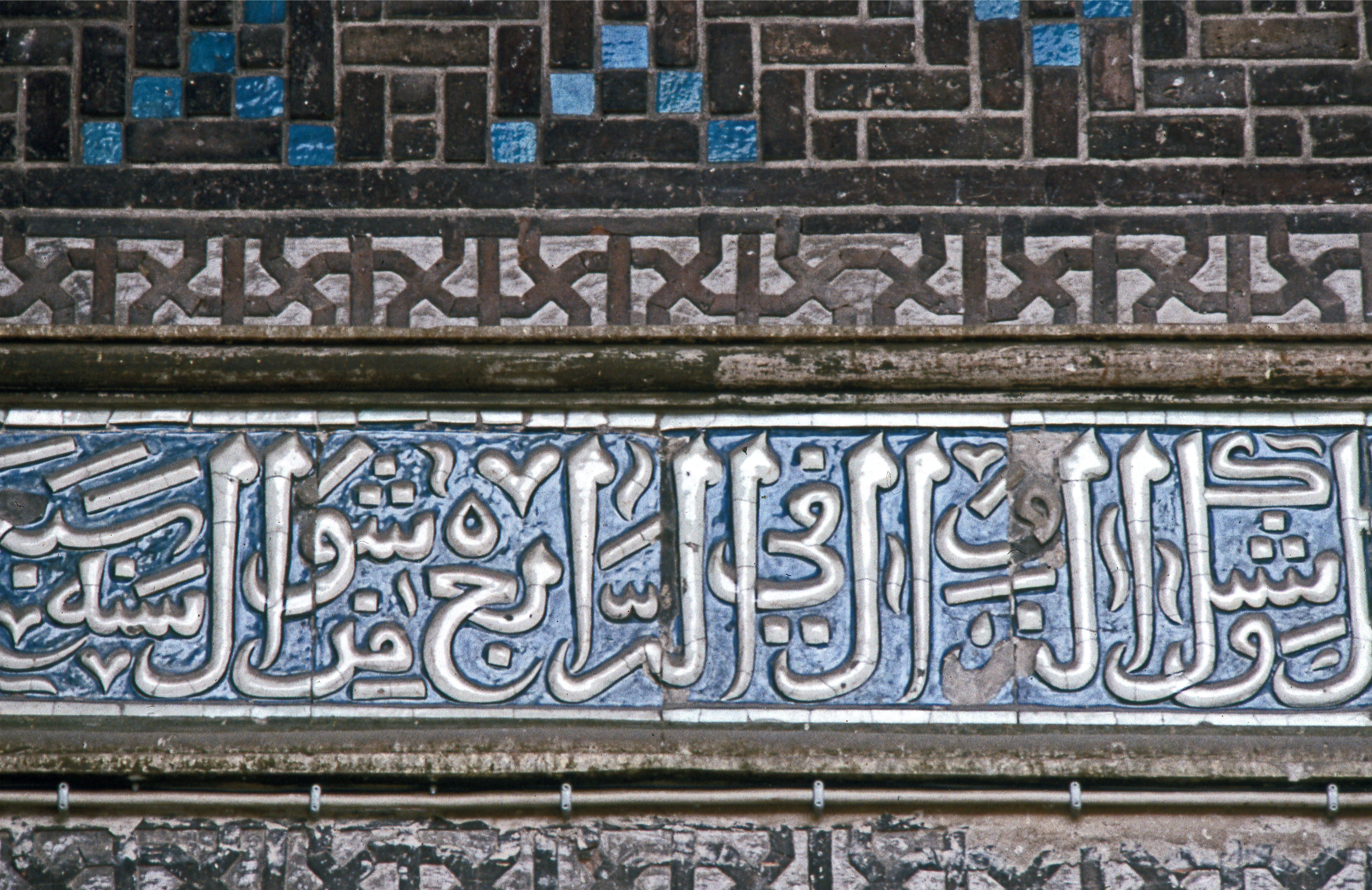
Şifaiye Medrese before restoration

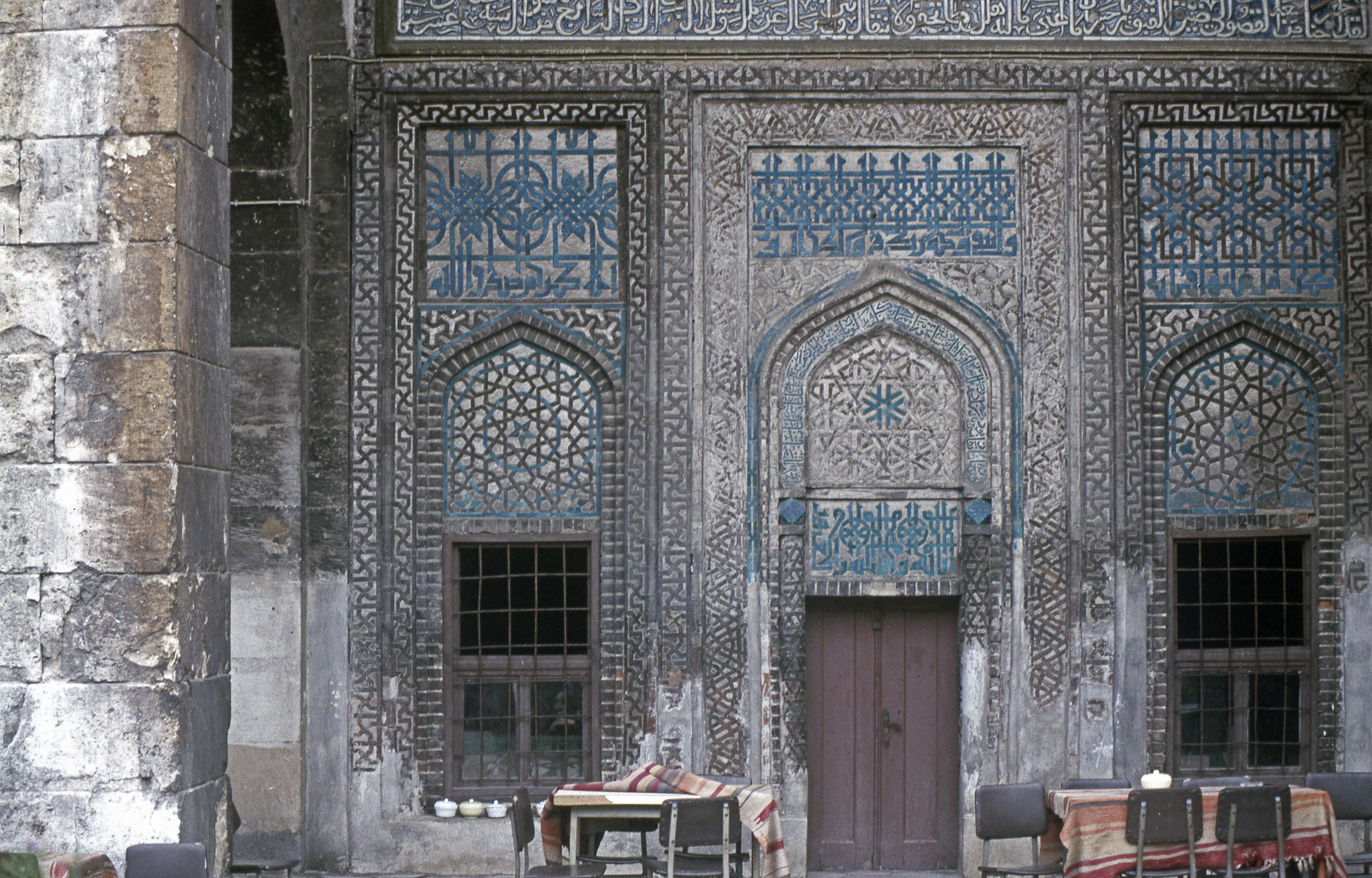
Şifaiye Medrese before restoration

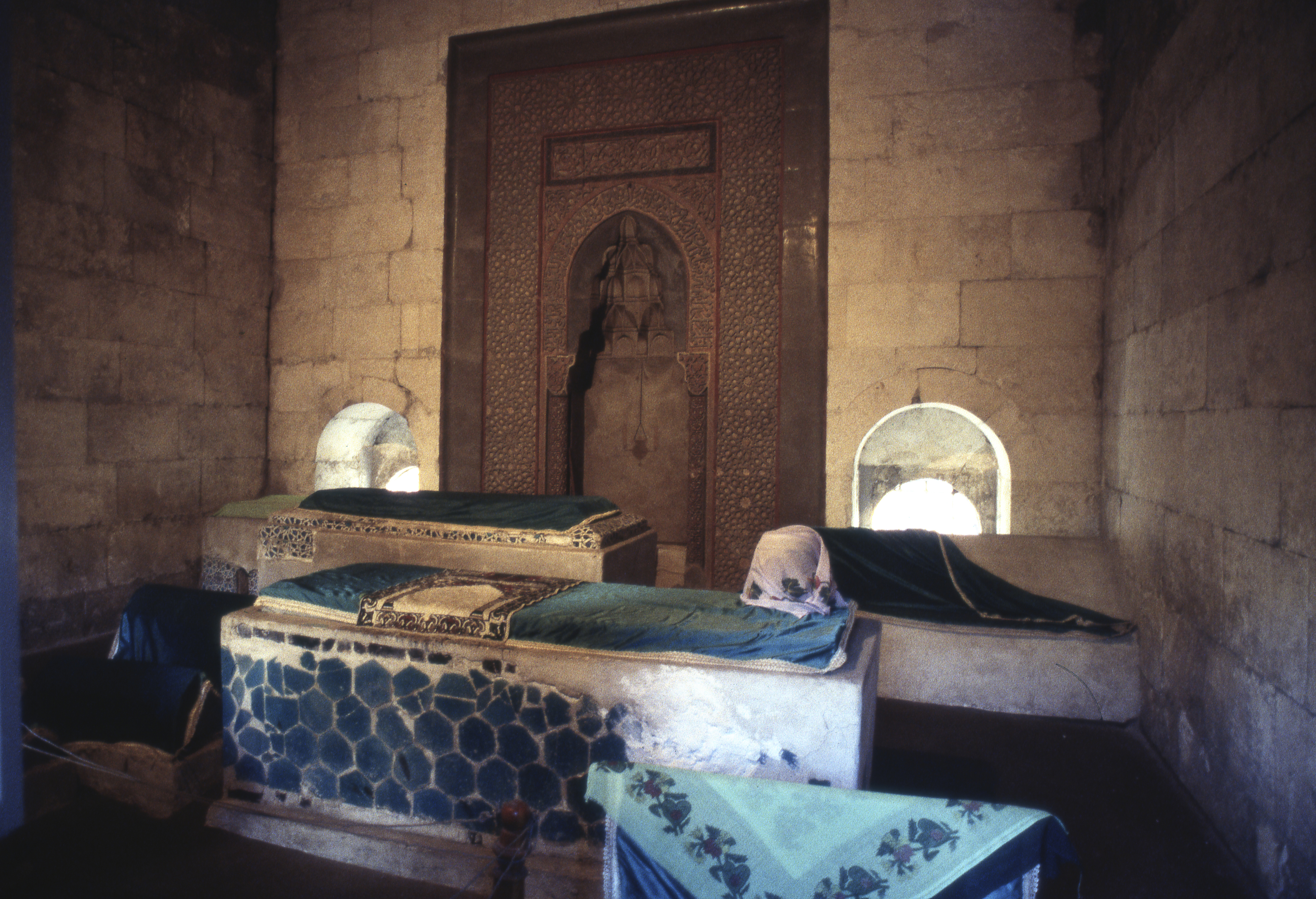
Şifaiye Medrese before restoration

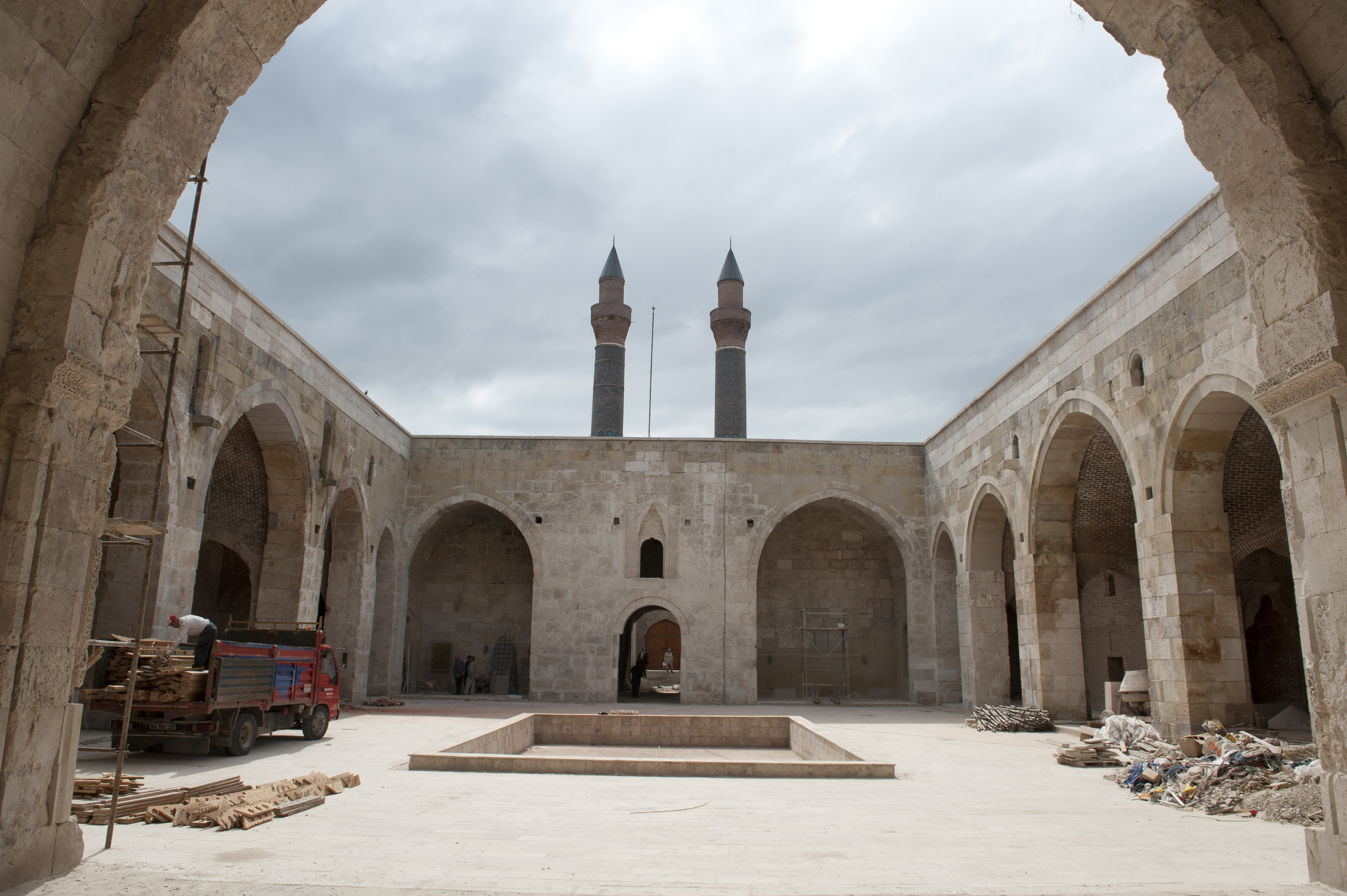
Şifaiye Medrese during restoration

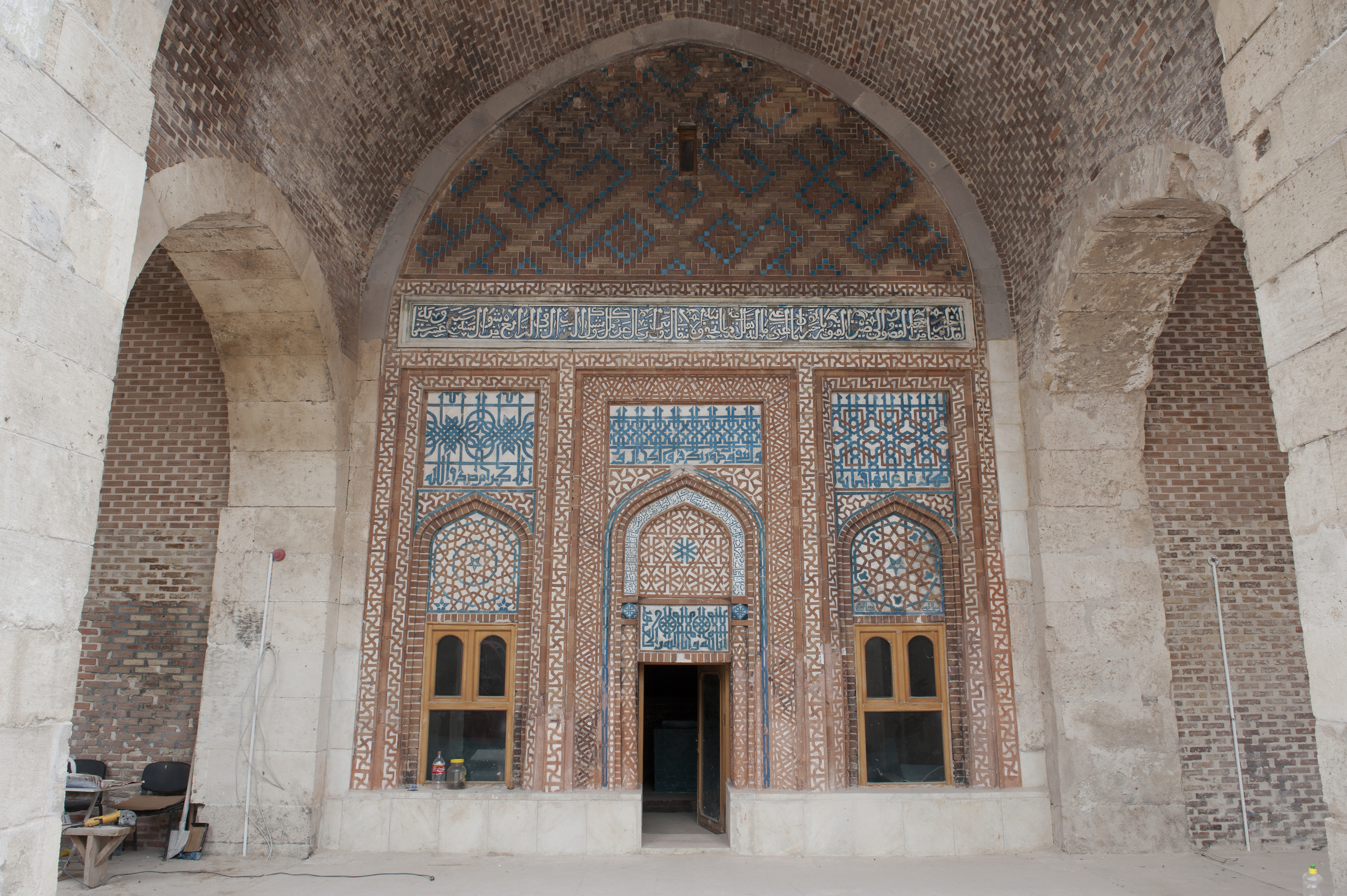
Şifaiye Medrese during restoration

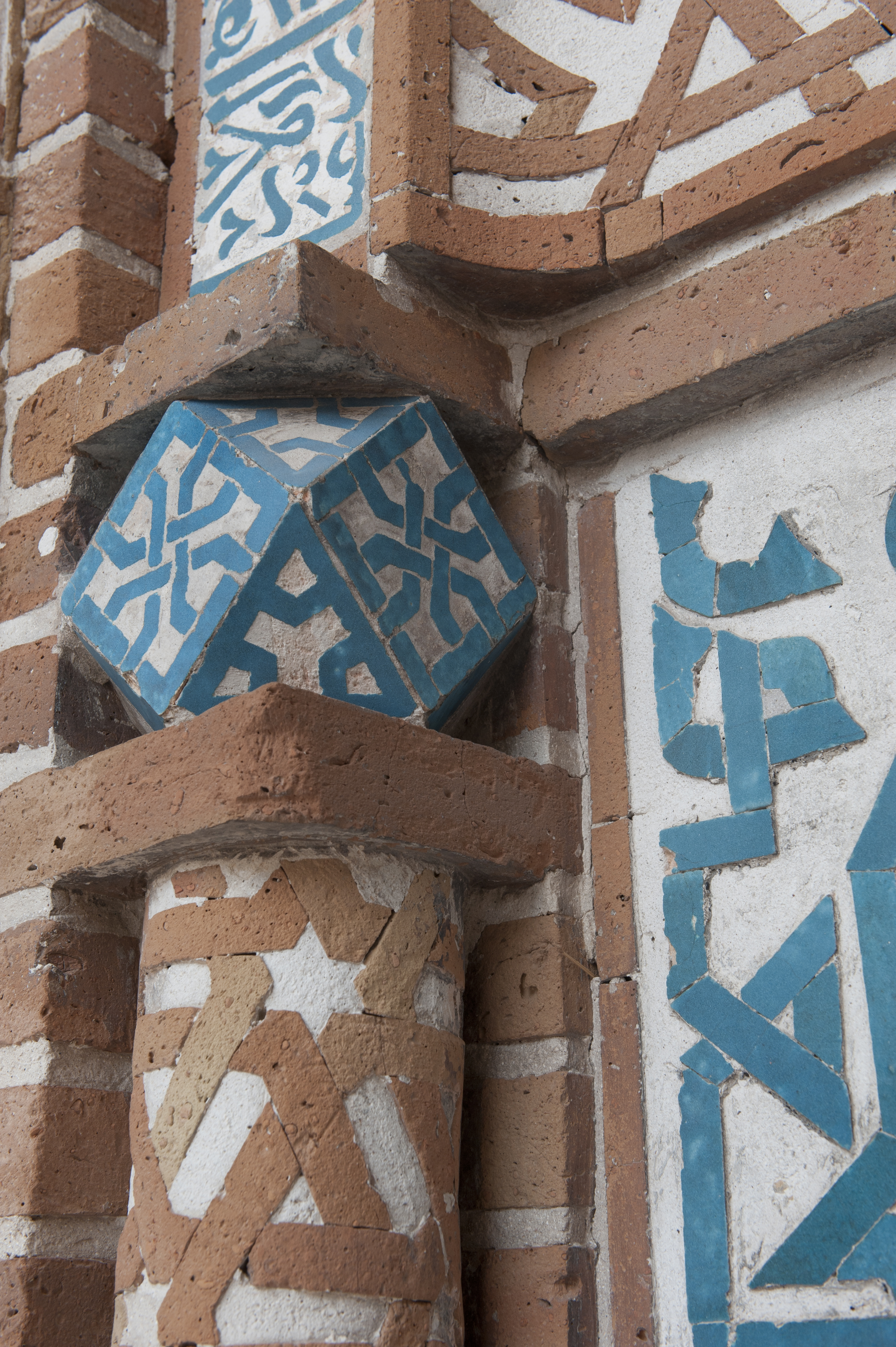
Şifaiye Medrese during restoration

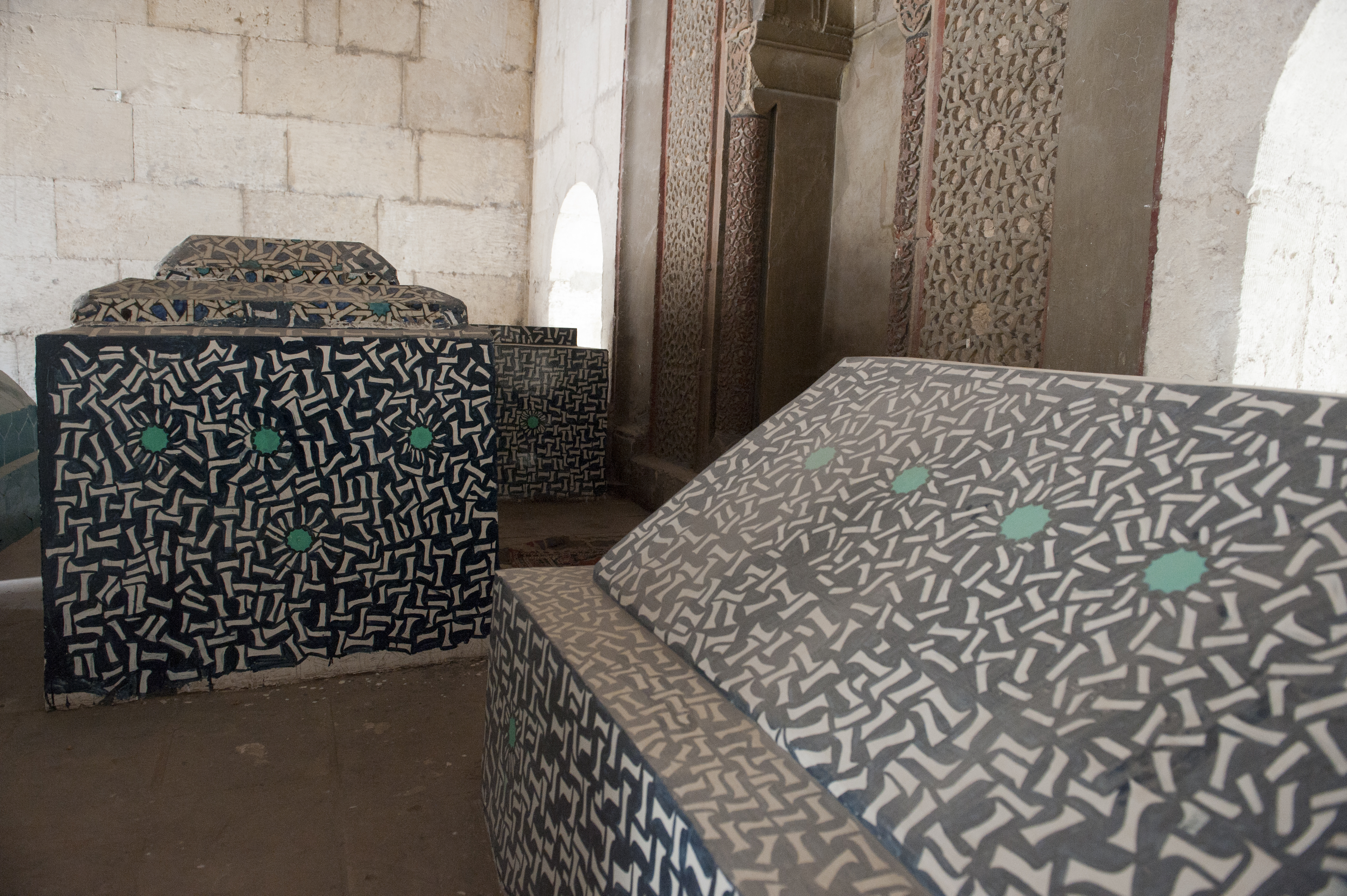
Şifaiye Medrese during restoration

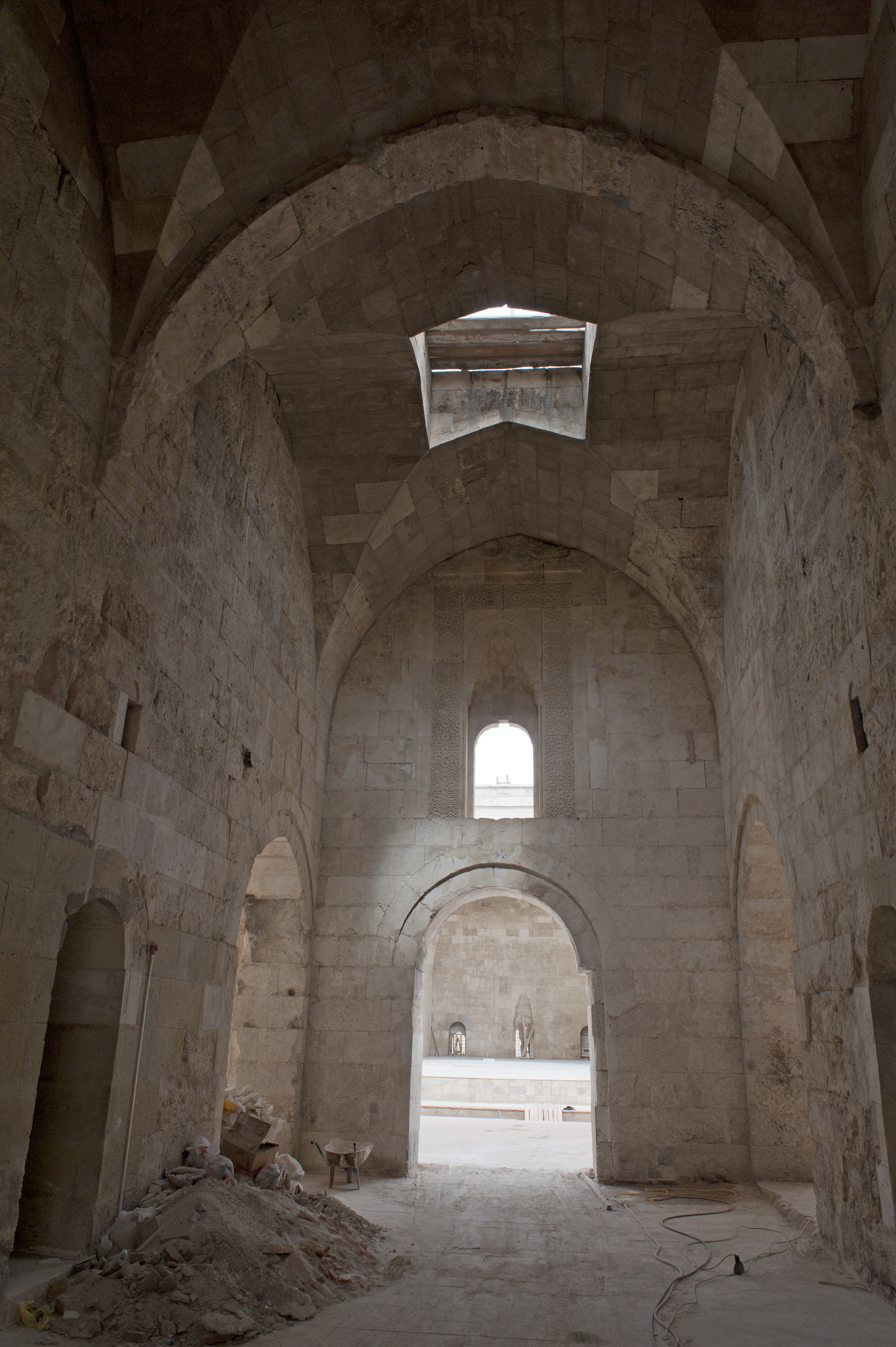
Şifaiye Medrese during restoration

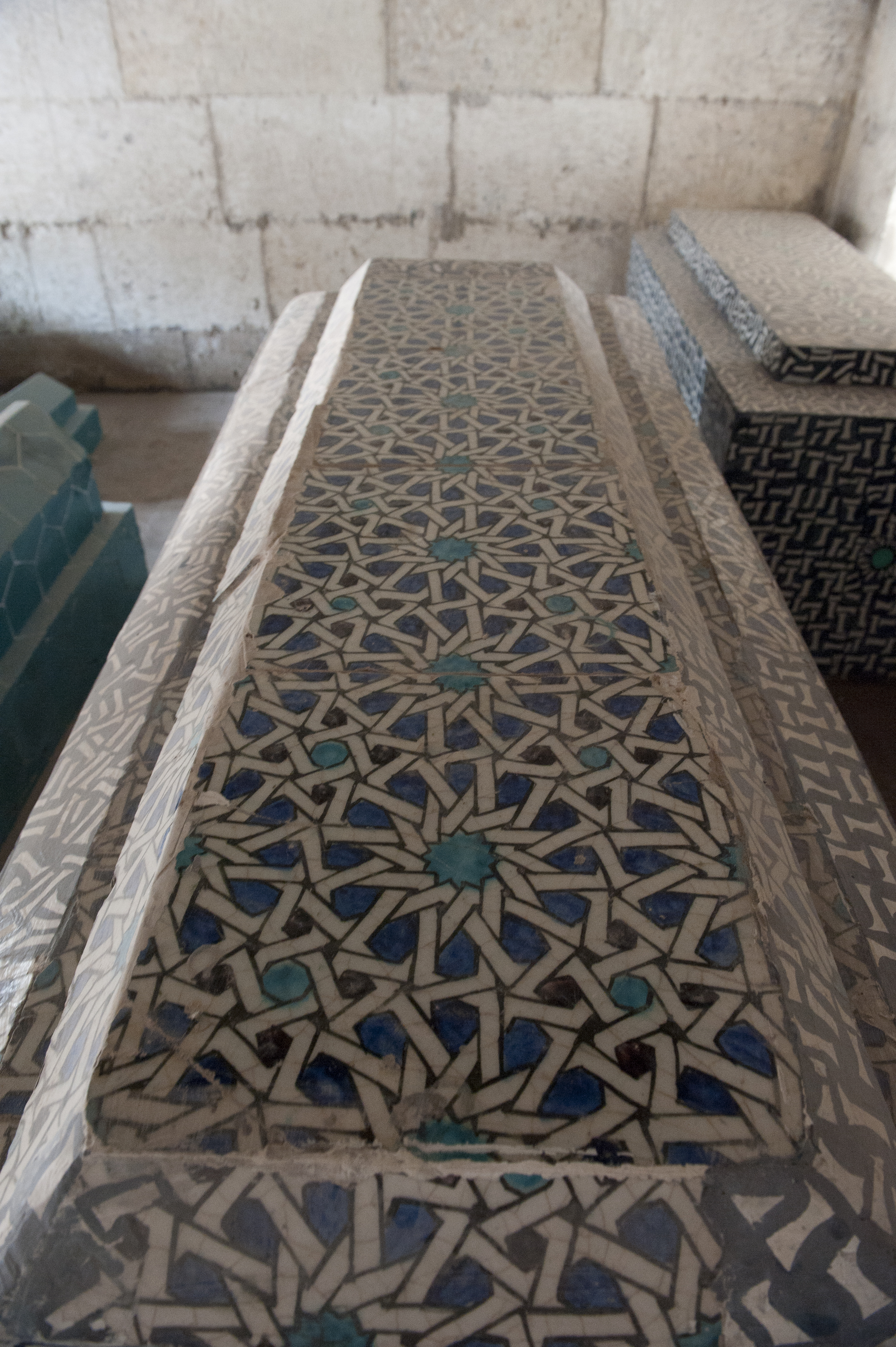
Şifaiye Medrese during restoration
