= Sivas =

- Municipality
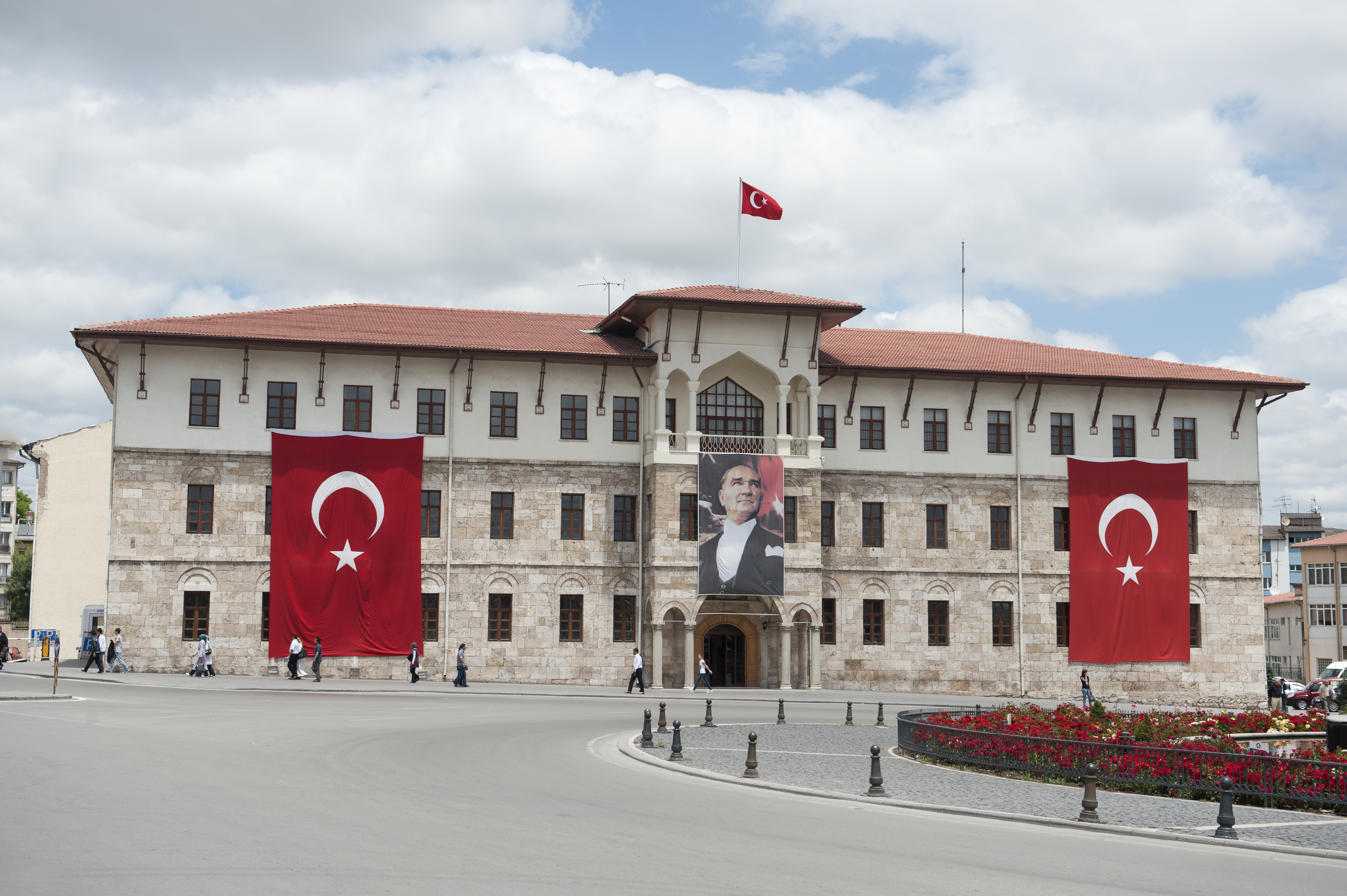
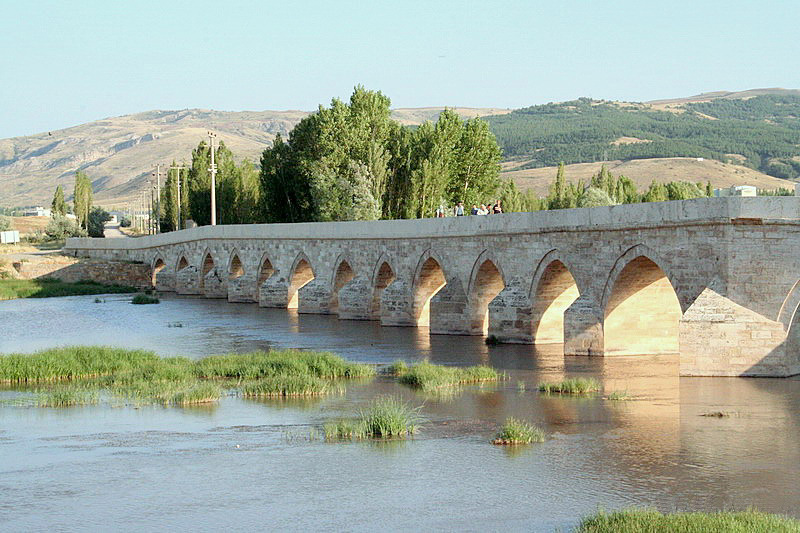
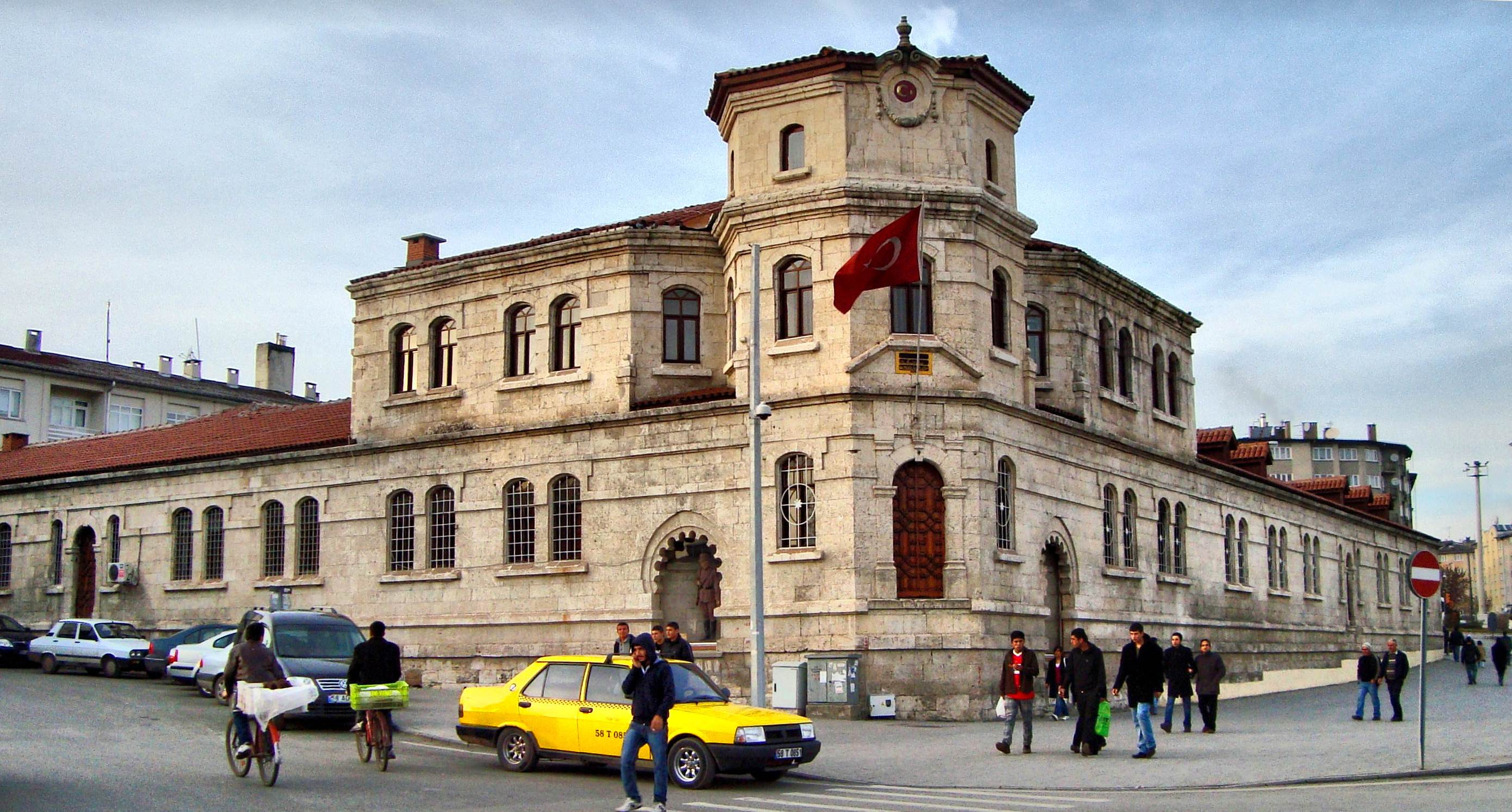
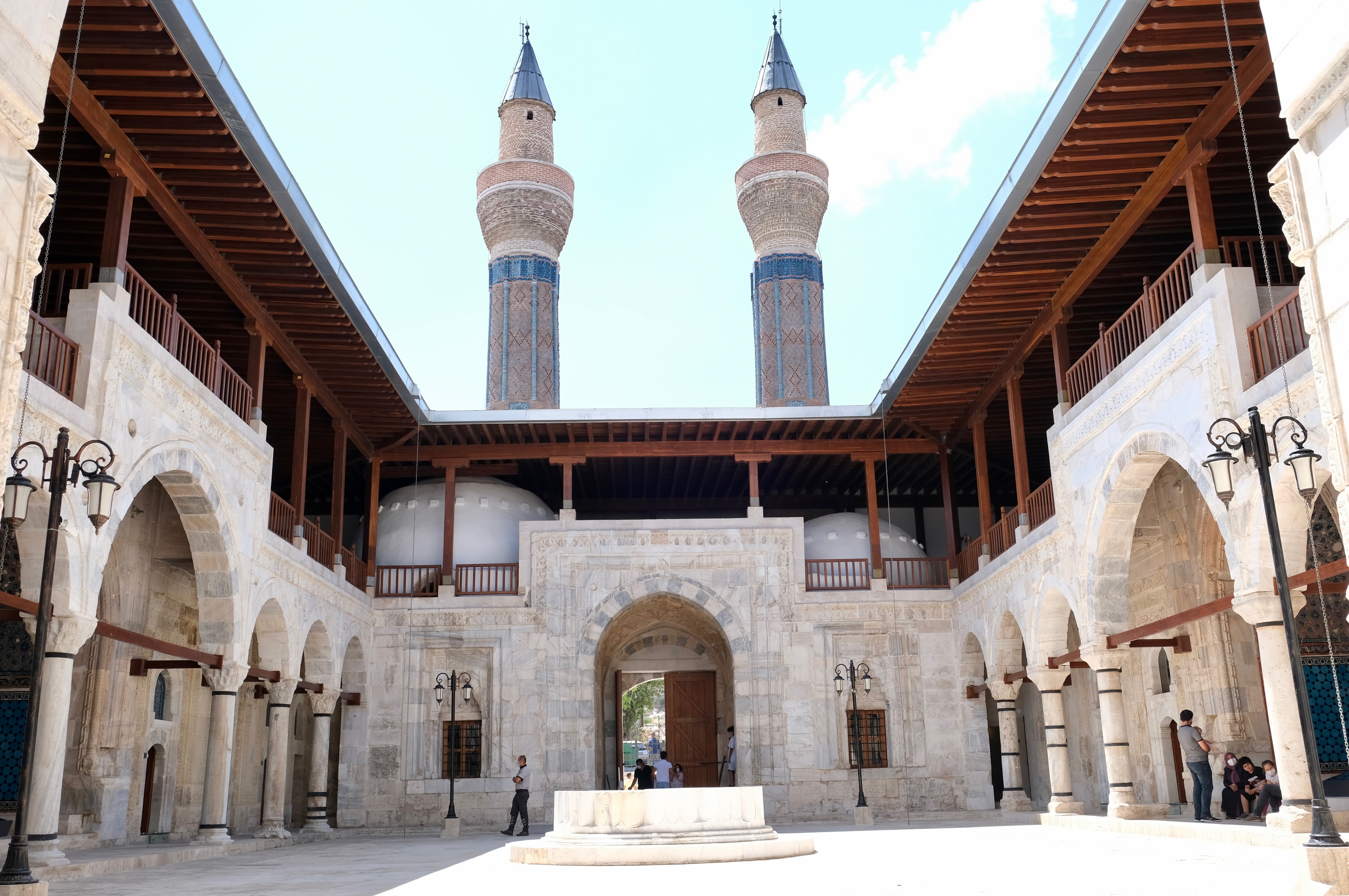
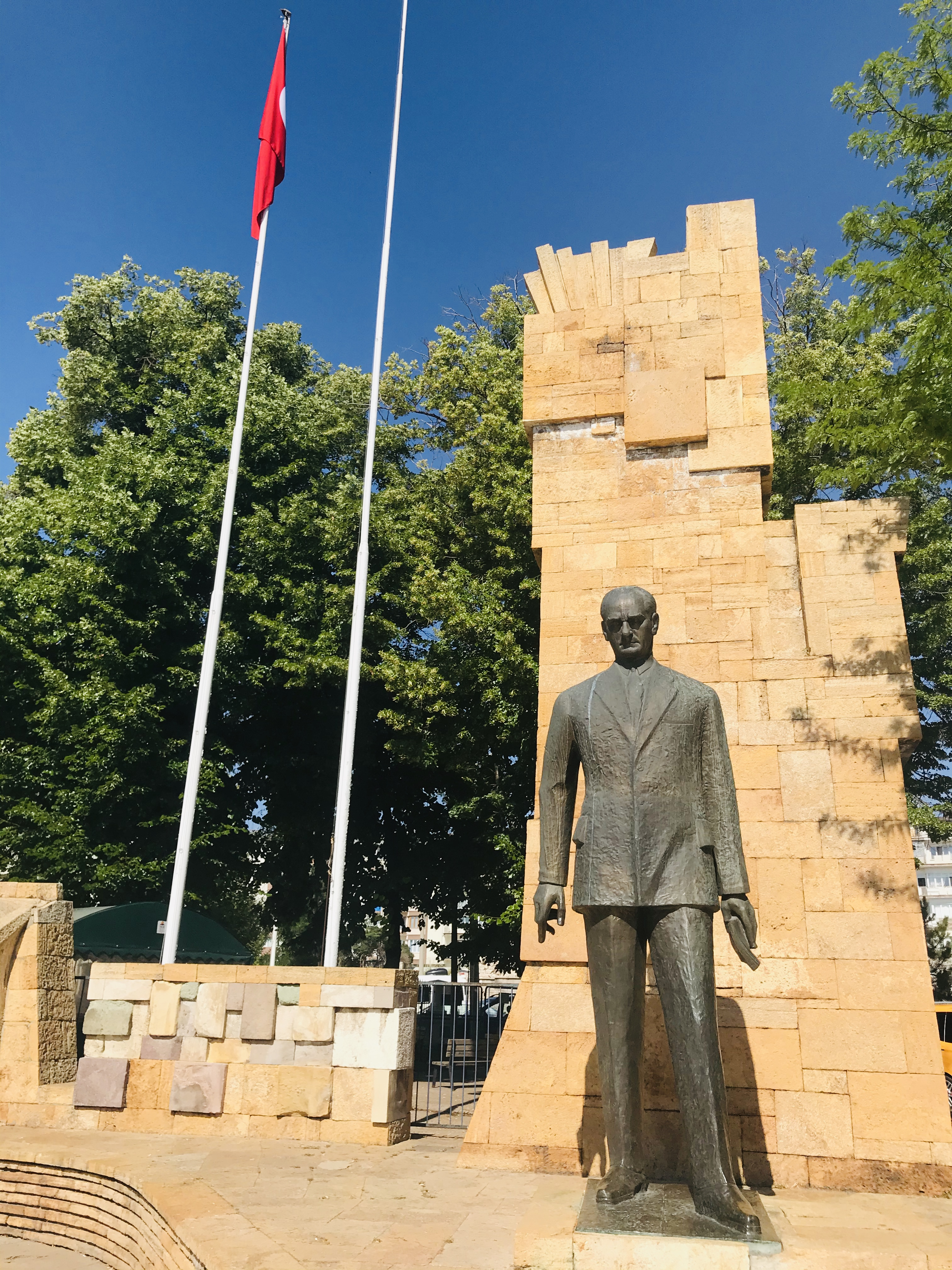
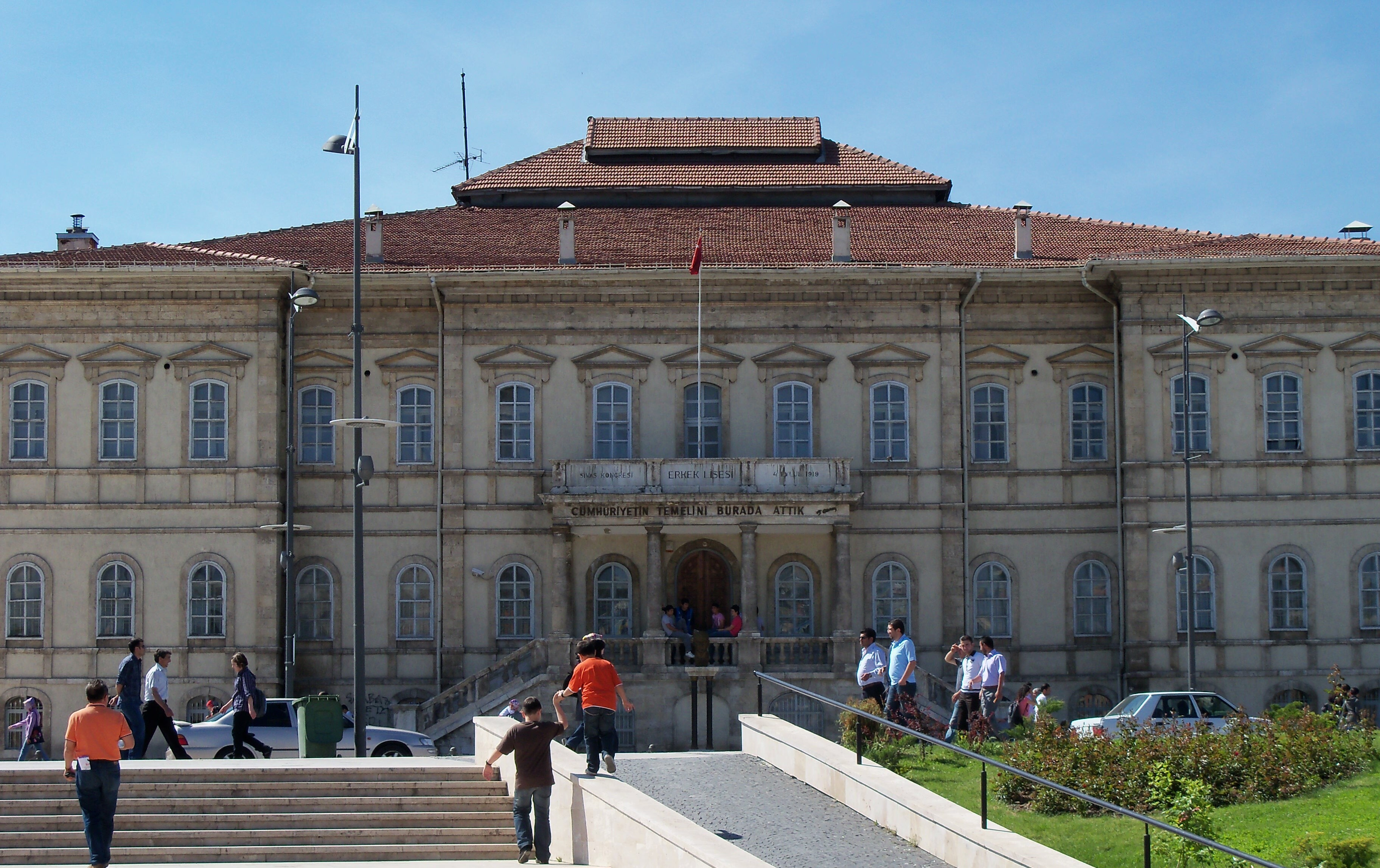
- Clockwise from top: Governorship Building, Historical Gendarmerie Barracks, Republic Monument, Sivas Congress and Ethnography Museum, Gök Medrese, Bent Bridge

- Coat of arms

- Location within Turkey Location within Turkey Central Anatolia
- Coordinates: 39°45′02″N 37°00′54″E
- Country: Turkey
- Province: Sivas
- District: Sivas

Government
  - Mayor: Adem Uzun (BBP)
- Elevation: 1,285 m (4,216 ft)
- Population (2022): 365,274
- Time zone: UTC+3 (TRT)
- Postal code: 58000
- Area code: 0346
- Website: www.sivas.bel.tr

Sivas is a city in central Turkey. It is the seat of Sivas Province and Sivas District. Its population is 365,274 (2022).

The city, which lies at an elevation of 1,278 metres (4,193 ft) in the broad valley of the Kızılırmak river, is a moderately sized trade centre and industrial city, although the economy has traditionally been based on agriculture. Rail repair shops and a thriving manufacturing industry of rugs, bricks, cement, and cotton and woolen textiles form the mainstays of the city's economy. The surrounding region is a cereal-producing area with large deposits of iron ore which are worked at Divriği.

Sivas is also a communications hub for the north–south and east–west trade routes to Iraq and Iran, respectively. With the development of railways, the city gained new economic importance as junction of important rail lines linking the cities of Ankara, Kayseri, Samsun, and Erzurum. The city is linked by air to Istanbul and İzmir.

== Name ==
The name of the city is a truncated form of its Byzantine Greek name Sivasteia from the Koine Greek name Sebasteia (Σεβάστεια), meaning that it was named in honour of an emperor using the title Sebastos, the Greek equivalent of Augustus. The city is occasionally referred to in historical and geographic contexts as Sebaste or Sebastea based on its Latin and latinized Ancient Greek names respectively, and in English the former name was Sebastia. In Armenian it is still Sebastia (Սեբաստիա). In Kurdish and Zazaki, it is called Sêwas and Sêwaz, respectively.

The popular name Sebastian derives from Sebastianòs, Σεβαστιανός, meaning someone from the city of Sebastia.

== History ==
=== Ancient history ===
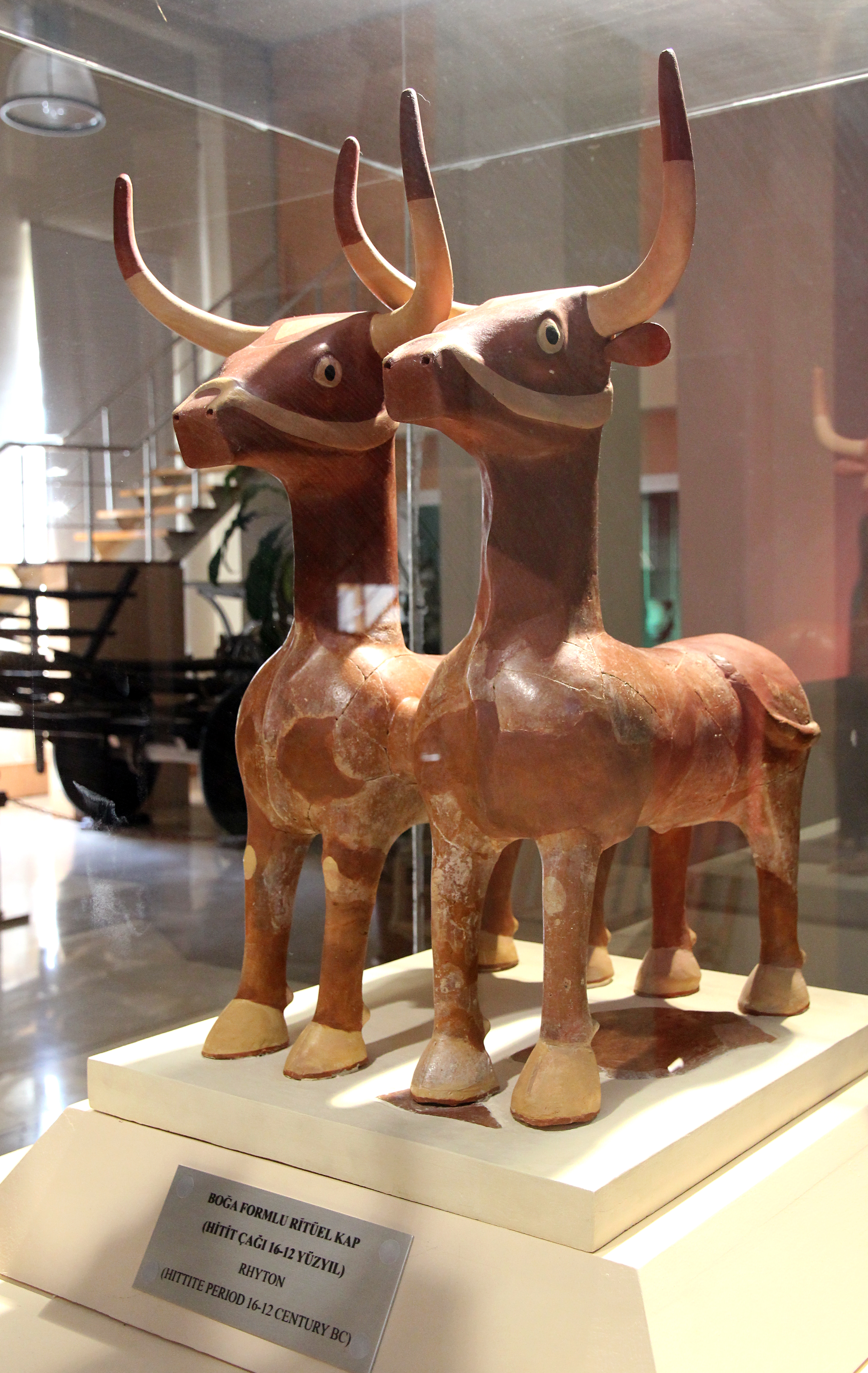
Hittite Artifacts in Sivas Archeology Museum

Little is known of Sivas' history prior to its emergence in the Roman period. In 64 BC, as part of his reorganization of Asia Minor after the Third Mithridatic War, Pompey the Great founded a city on the site called "Megalopolis". Numismatic evidence suggests that Megalopolis changed its name in the last years of the 1st century BC to "Sebaste", the feminine form of Sebastos, the Greek equivalent of Augustus.

The name "Sivas" is the Turkish version deriving from the name Sebasteia, as the city was known during the late Roman (Byzantine) empire. Sebasteia became the capital of the province of Armenia Minor under the emperor Diocletian, was a town of some importance in the early history of the Christian Church; in the 4th century it was the home of Saint Blaise and Saint Peter of Sebaste, bishops of the town, and of Eustathius, one of the early founders of monasticism in Asia Minor. It was also the place of martyrdom of the Forty Martyrs of Sebaste, also 4th century. In 536, Justinian I made it the capital of Armenia Secunda and refortified it.

=== Medieval history ===
The city was sacked by the troops of Muhammad ibn Marwan in 692 and became first a kleisoura and in 911 a theme. Under Nikephoros II Phokas, many Armenians settled in the region. In the early 1020s, Basil II delivered the region around Sebasteia in exchange for Vaspurakan to King Seneqerim Ardzruni, who settled in Sebasteia with thousands of his Armenian followers.

Sebasteia was the first important city to be plundered by Turkish tribes in 1059. In August of that year the troops of various emirs gathered before the unwalled city. Initially they hesitated to sack it, mistaking the domes of the city's several Christian churches for tents of military camps. As soon as they realized that the city was defenceless they burned it for eight days, slaughtered a large part of its population and took many prisoners. The city came under the domain of the Turkmen Danishmend dynasty (1071–1174) after the Battle of Manzikert in 1071. After the death of Danişmend Gazi, Sivas passed to Nizamettin Yağıbasan who won it after a struggle with Danişmend Gazi's successors. In 1143 the Seljuk ruler Mesud I sacked the city. In 1174 the city was captured by Kilij Arslan II and periodically served as capital of the Sultanate of Rum along with Iconium. Under Seljuk rule, Sivas was an important center of trade along the Silk Road and site of a citadel, along with mosques and madrasas (Islamic educational institutions), four of which survive today and one of which houses the Sivas Museum. Then it passed to the Ilkhanids, Eretna and Kadı Burhanettin.

=== Ottoman period ===
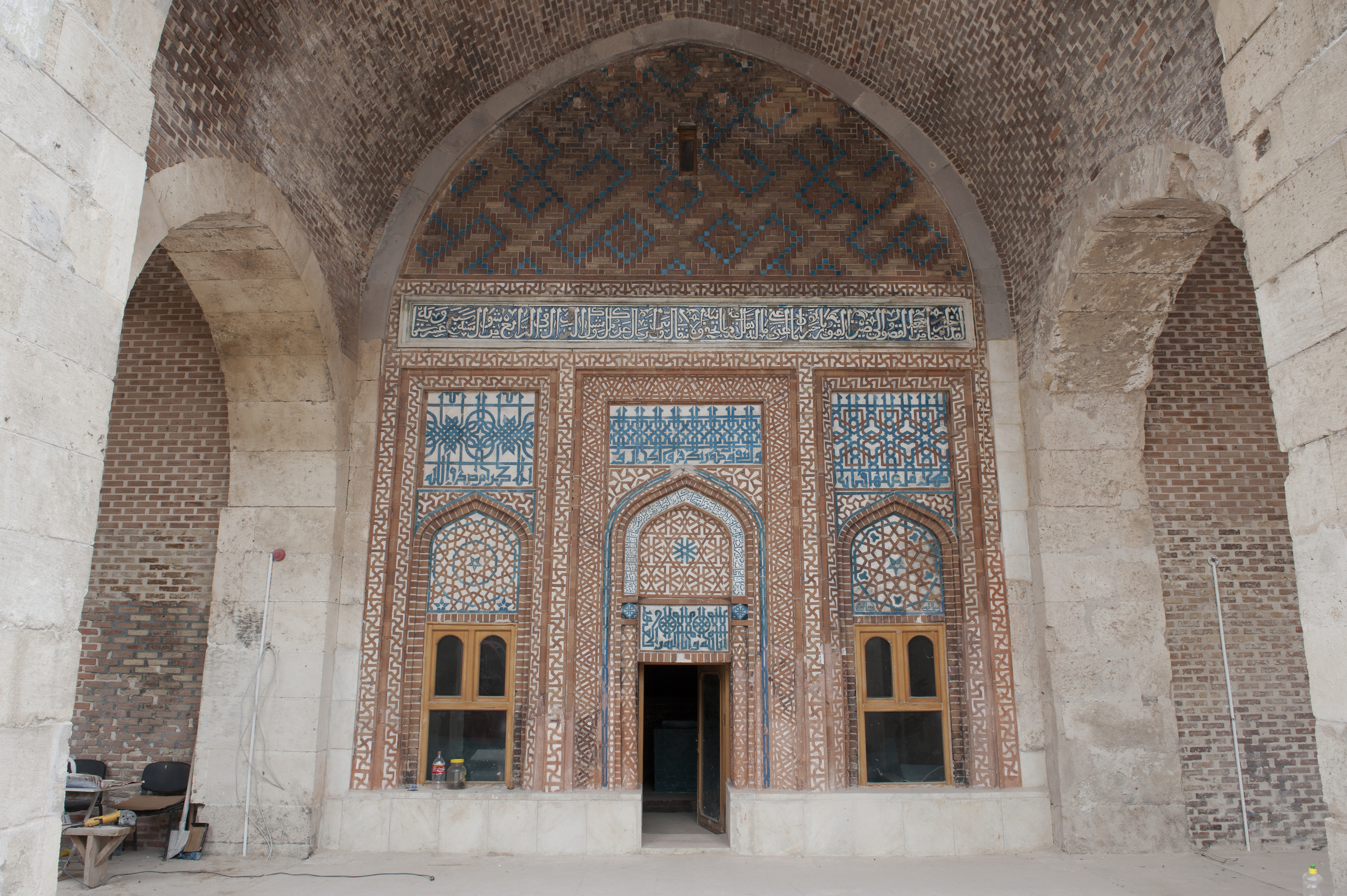
Tomb of Izz al-Din Kayka'us I in the Şifaiye Medrese (1217–1218)

The city was acquired by Ottoman Sultan Bayezid I (1389–1402). In 1398, Tamerlane swept into the area and his forces destroyed the city in 1400, after which it was recaptured by the Ottomans in 1408. Under the Ottomans, Sivas served as the administrative center of the Eyalet of Rum until about the late 19th century. The Armenian Apostolic Church maintained six Armenian churches in Sivas, being the Meryemana, Surp Sarkis, Surp Minas, Surp Prgitsh, Surp Hagop, and Surp Kevork; four monasteries, Surp Nschan, Surp Hreshdagabed, Surp Anabad, and Surp Hntragadar; an Armenian Apostolic orphanage, and several schools. The Armenian Catholic Church and the Latins also had one church and a metropolitan of Sebastea, as did the Greek Orthodox Church. Two Protestant churches and eight, mostly German- and American-staffed, schools. During the genocide against Armenians as well as during the genocide against Greek Christians from July 5, 1915, onward, the Christian community of Sivas was exterminated during deportations and mass executions.

=== Turkish Republic period ===
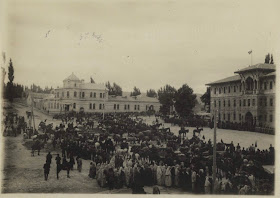
12th division from Erzurum coming to Sivas for Battle of the Sakarya.

The Sivas Congress (Heyet-i Temsiliye) was held in this city 4–11 September 1919. With the arrival of Mustafa Kemal Atatürk (1881–1938), the founder of the Turkish Republic, from Amasya, the Congress of Sivas is considered a turning point in the formation of the Turkish Republic. It was at this congress that Atatürk's position as chair of the executive committee of the national resistance was confirmed (see Turkish War of Independence). Sivas was depicted on the reverse of the Turkish 500 lira banknote of 1927–1939.

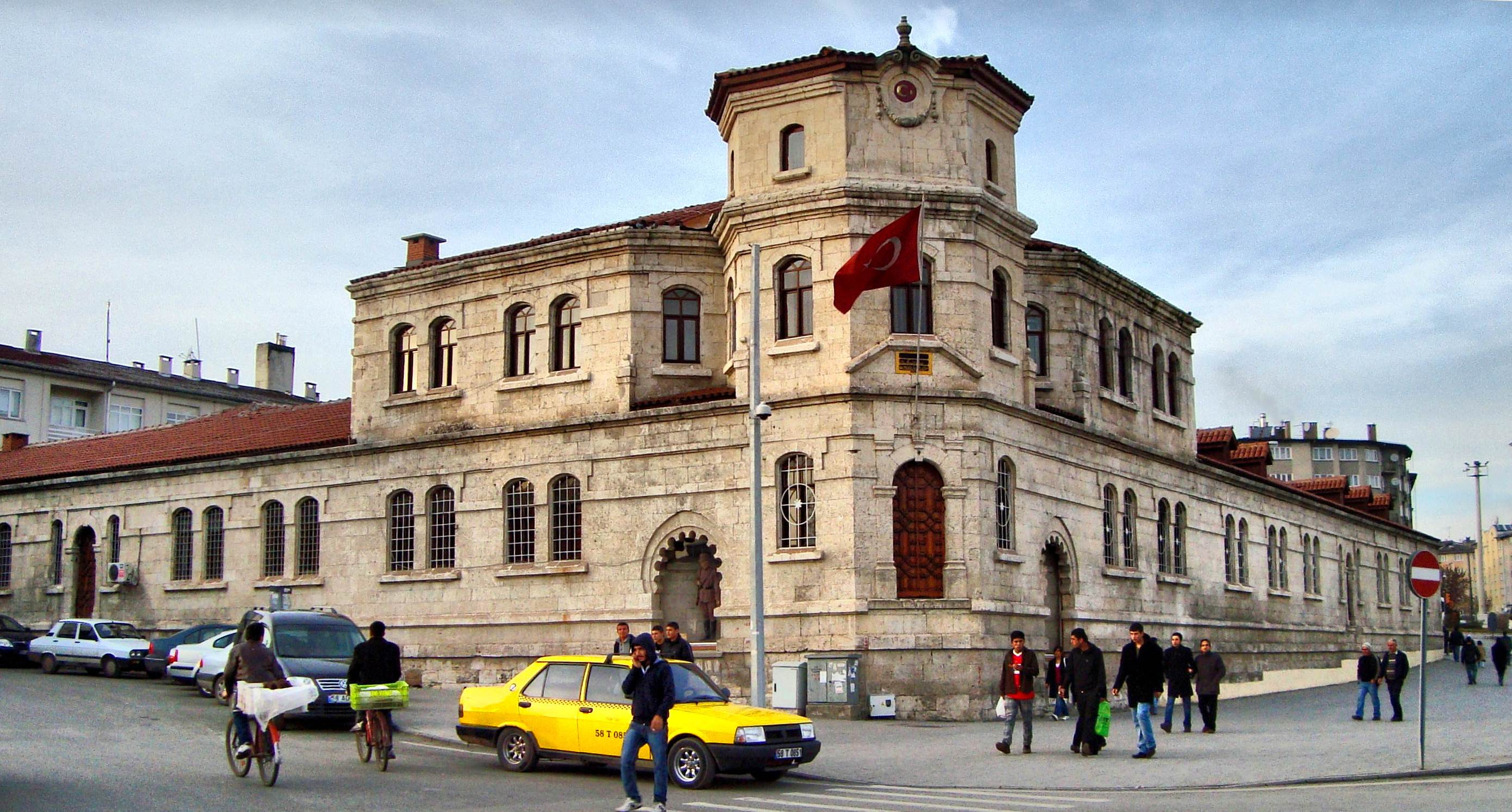
Historical Sivas Gendarmerie Barracks

On 2 July 1993, 37 participants in an Alevi cultural and literary festival were killed when a mob of demonstrators set fire to the Madımak hotel in Sivas during a violent protest by some 15,000 members of various radical Islamist groups against the presence of Aziz Nesin, who had translated Salman Rushdie's The Satanic Verses novel into Turkish. The deaths resulted in the Turkish government taking a harder stance against religious fanaticism, militant Islam, and antisecularism. In late 2006, there was a campaign by the Pir Sultan Abdal Cultural Institute to convert the former hotel into a museum to commemorate the tragedy, now known as the Sivas massacre.

== Demographics ==
In the mid 19th century, Sivas had 17,000 inhabitants, with a majority of Muslim Turks. In 1914, Sivas had 45,000 inhabitants: a third were Armenians, the rest Turks and 1,500 Greeks. In July 1915, Armenian families were deported as part of the Armenian genocide. Greeks were removed as part of the 1923 population exchange between Greece and Turkey. In 1925, there were 3,000 Armenians left around Sivas. By 1929, Armenians numbered 1,200. In 1939 the total population was 35,000, including 2000 Armenians. In the 1970s, there were 300 Armenians. In the 1990s, there were 50 Armenians.

== Climate ==
Sivas has a humid continental climate (Köppen: Dsb, Trewartha: Dcbo), with warm, dry summers and cold, snowy winters. The driest months are July and August and the wettest are April and May.

Climate data for Sivas (1991–2020, extremes 1930–2023)
Month	Jan	Feb	Mar	Apr	May	Jun	Jul	Aug	Sep	Oct	Nov	Dec	Year
Record high °C (°F)	18.6 (65.5)	18.1 (64.6)	25.2 (77.4)	29.5 (85.1)	33.5 (92.3)	35.5 (95.9)	40.0 (104.0)	39.9 (103.8)	37.0 (98.6)	30.5 (86.9)	24.0 (75.2)	19.4 (66.9)	40.0 (104.0)
Mean daily maximum °C (°F)	1.7 (35.1)	3.5 (38.3)	9.5 (49.1)	15.9 (60.6)	20.7 (69.3)	25.1 (77.2)	29.0 (84.2)	29.7 (85.5)	25.5 (77.9)	19.3 (66.7)	11.2 (52.2)	4.2 (39.6)	16.3 (61.3)
Daily mean °C (°F)	−2.7 (27.1)	−1.6 (29.1)	3.8 (38.8)	9.3 (48.7)	13.7 (56.7)	17.7 (63.9)	20.8 (69.4)	21.1 (70.0)	17.0 (62.6)	11.6 (52.9)	4.7 (40.5)	−0.2 (31.6)	9.6 (49.3)
Mean daily minimum °C (°F)	−6.2 (20.8)	−5.7 (21.7)	−0.9 (30.4)	3.7 (38.7)	7.6 (45.7)	10.8 (51.4)	13.2 (55.8)	13.3 (55.9)	9.5 (49.1)	5.3 (41.5)	−0.3 (31.5)	−3.7 (25.3)	3.9 (39.0)
Record low °C (°F)	−31.2 (−24.2)	−34.4 (−29.9)	−27.6 (−17.7)	−11.0 (12.2)	−5.5 (22.1)	−0.6 (30.9)	3.0 (37.4)	3.2 (37.8)	−3.8 (25.2)	−9.0 (15.8)	−24.4 (−11.9)	−30.2 (−22.4)	−34.4 (−29.9)
Average precipitation mm (inches)	44.6 (1.76)	41.0 (1.61)	48.4 (1.91)	59.0 (2.32)	64.6 (2.54)	35.1 (1.38)	11.1 (0.44)	7.1 (0.28)	19.2 (0.76)	37.5 (1.48)	42.1 (1.66)	45.7 (1.80)	455.4 (17.93)
Average precipitation days	13.17	12.03	14.23	13.77	14.43	9.60	2.43	2.50	4.70	8.60	9.20	12.43	117.09
Average snowy days	12.52	9.52	6.43	1.19	0.13	0	0	0	0	0.48	2.33	7.10	39.7
Average relative humidity (%)	76.8	74.1	67.2	61.6	62.4	60.2	55.8	55.3	56.6	63.5	70.5	76.7	65.0
Mean monthly sunshine hours	81.1	104.4	153.2	196.2	238.7	302.7	355.6	352.7	280.6	195.7	127.1	73.7	2,455.1
Mean daily sunshine hours	2.7	3.7	5.0	6.6	8.0	10.1	11.5	11.4	9.4	6.3	4.2	2.4	6.8
Source 1: Turkish State Meteorological Service
Source 2: NOAA (humidity, sun 1991-2020) Meteomanz(snow days 2000-2020)

== Economy ==
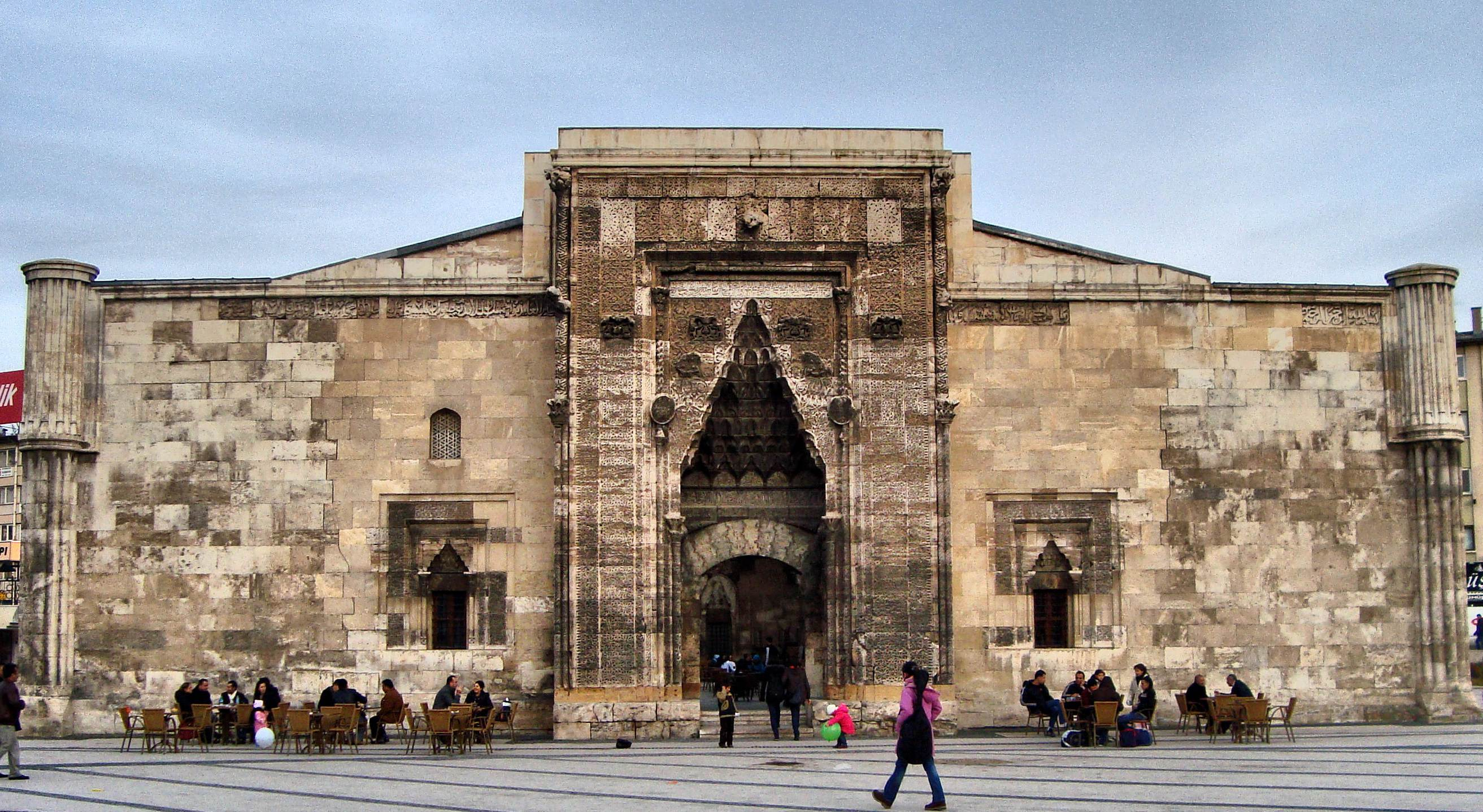
Buruciye Madrasah is an example of Anatolian Seljuks.

Historically, Sivas was known for producing cereal.

== Sights ==
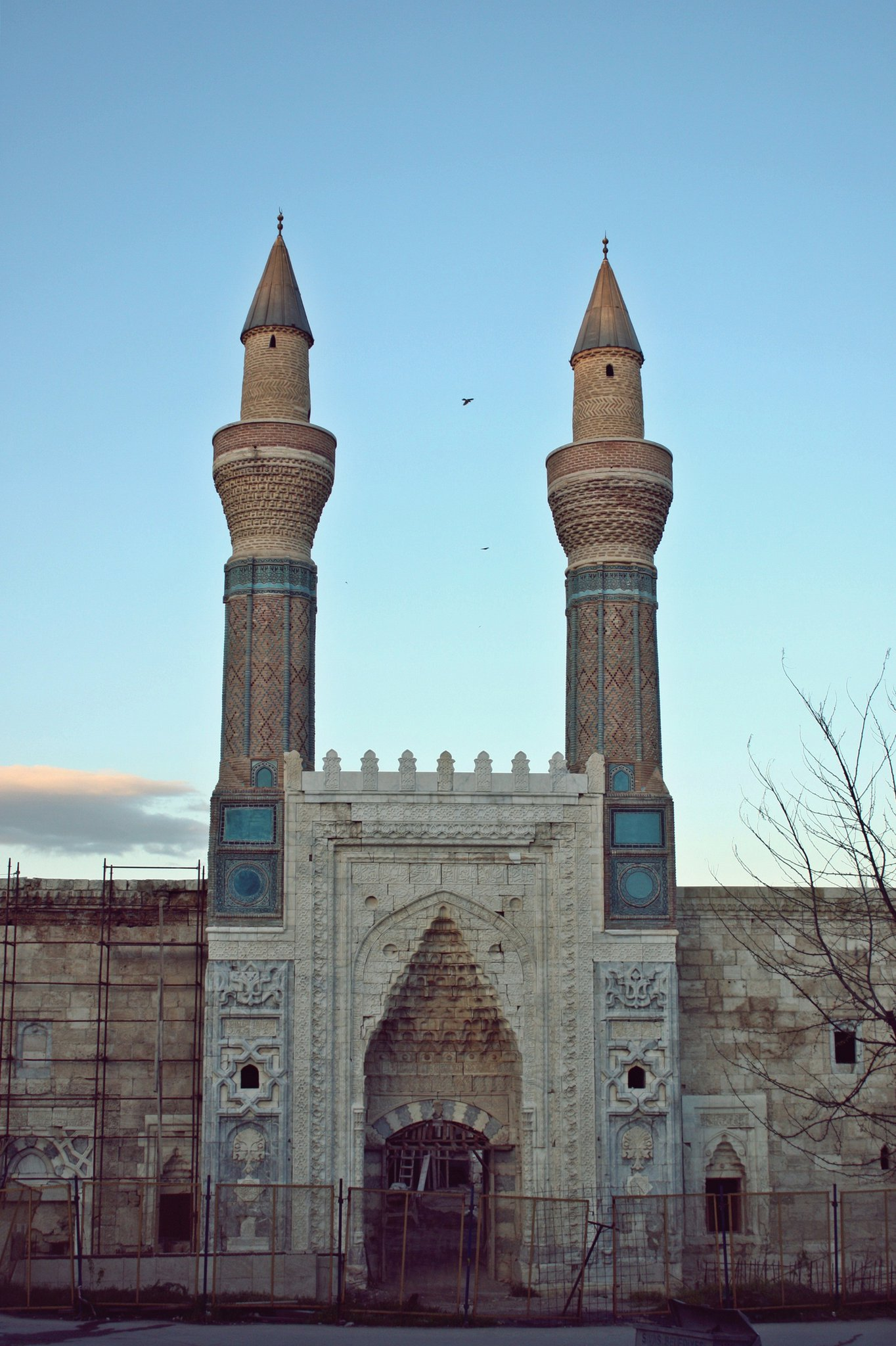
Gök Medrese built by the Seljuk Empire in 1271

A cultural hub as well as an industrial one, Sivas contains many examples of 12th and 13th-century Seljuk architecture. The Great Mosque (Ulu Cami) of Sivas was first built in 1197. The Sifaiye Medresesi was completed in 1217–1218 and served as a darüşşifa (hospital and medical school). It has a four-iwan layout typical of Seljuk madrasas and is fronted by an elaborately carved entrance portal. It also contains the tomb of its founder, the Seljuk sultan Izz al-Din Kayka'us I (d. 1220). In 1271–1272, when the city was under Ilkhanid influence, three different madrasas were built by competing patrons: the Buruciye Medrese, the Çifte Minare Medresesi, and the Gök Medrese ("Blue Madrasa"; depicted on the obverse of the Turkish 500 lira banknote of 1927–1939). All three have elaborate entrance portals.

The city also contains some fine examples of the Ottoman architectural style. The most prominent example of Ottoman architecture in the city is the Kale Camii ("Citadel Mosque"), built in 1580 by Mehmet Pasha, an Ottoman vizier. Kurşunlu Hamamı ("Leaden Bath") which was completed in 1576, is the largest historic bathhouse in the city and it contains many details from the classical Ottoman bath building. Behrampaşa Hanı (a caravanserai), was completed in 1573 and it is famous for the lion motifs around its windows.

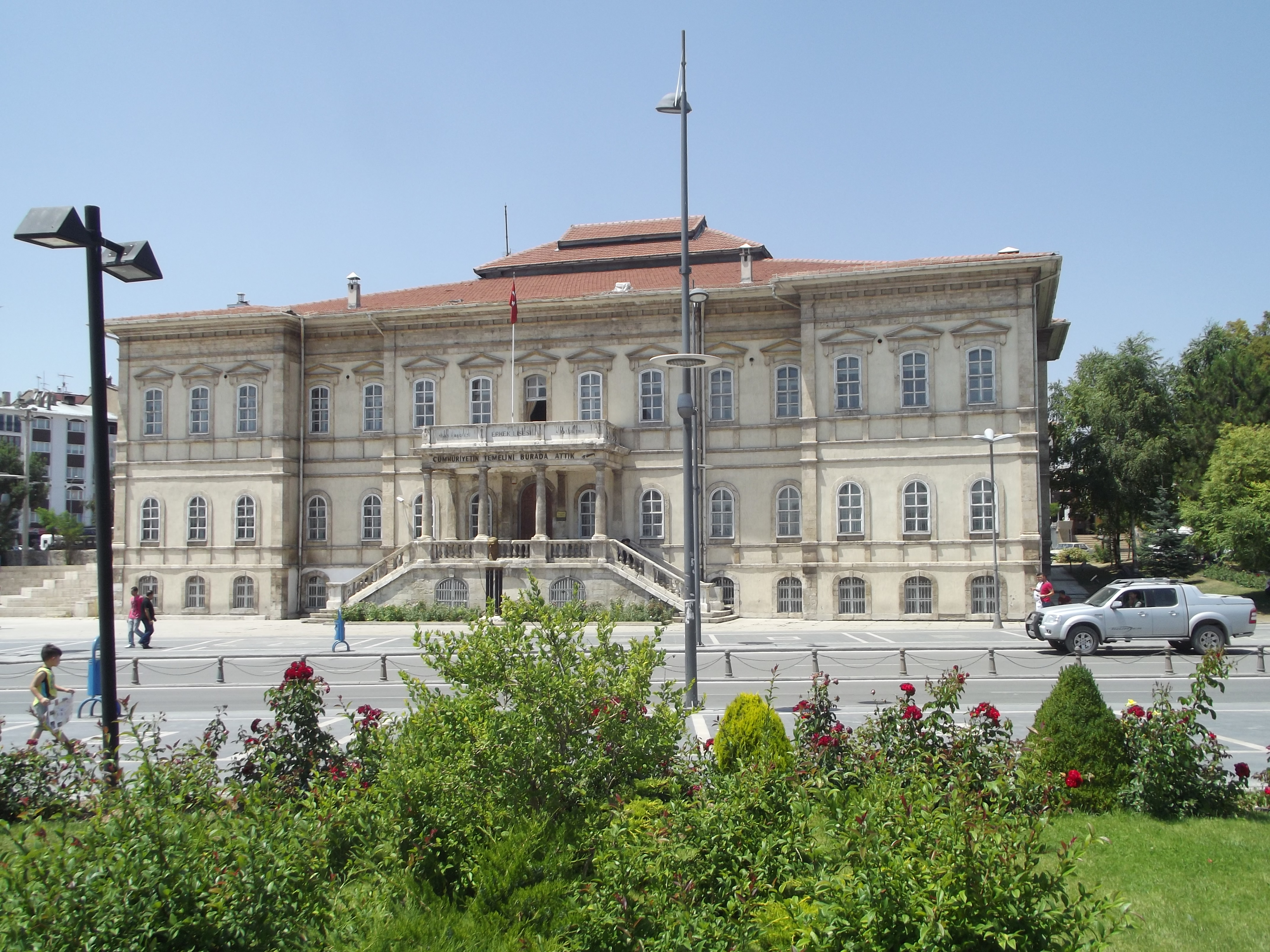
Sivas Congress was held in the Ethnography Museum building between 4–11 September 1919

Atatürk Congress and Ethnography Museum (Atatürk Kongre ve Etnografya Müzesi) is a museum with two sections. One is a dedicated to the Ottoman heritage of Sivas. The other is to the Sivas Congress, one of the pivotal moments in the Turkish national movement. Other museums include the Sivas Congress and Ethnography Museum and the Sivas Archaeology Museum. The Madımak Science and Culture Centre is housed in the former Madımak Hotel.

The modern heart of the city is Hükümet Square (Hükümet Meydanı, also called Konak Meydanı) located just next to the Governor's mansion. This area is also home to many of the city's high end hotels and restaurants. The city's shoppers usually head to Atatürk Avenue.

Sivas is also famous for its thermal springs which have a respectable percentage in the city's income. People believe that the water of these thermal springs can cure many illnesses. The most famous thermal areas are, Sıcak Çermik, Soğuk Çermik and Kangal Balıklı Kaplıca.

== Sport ==
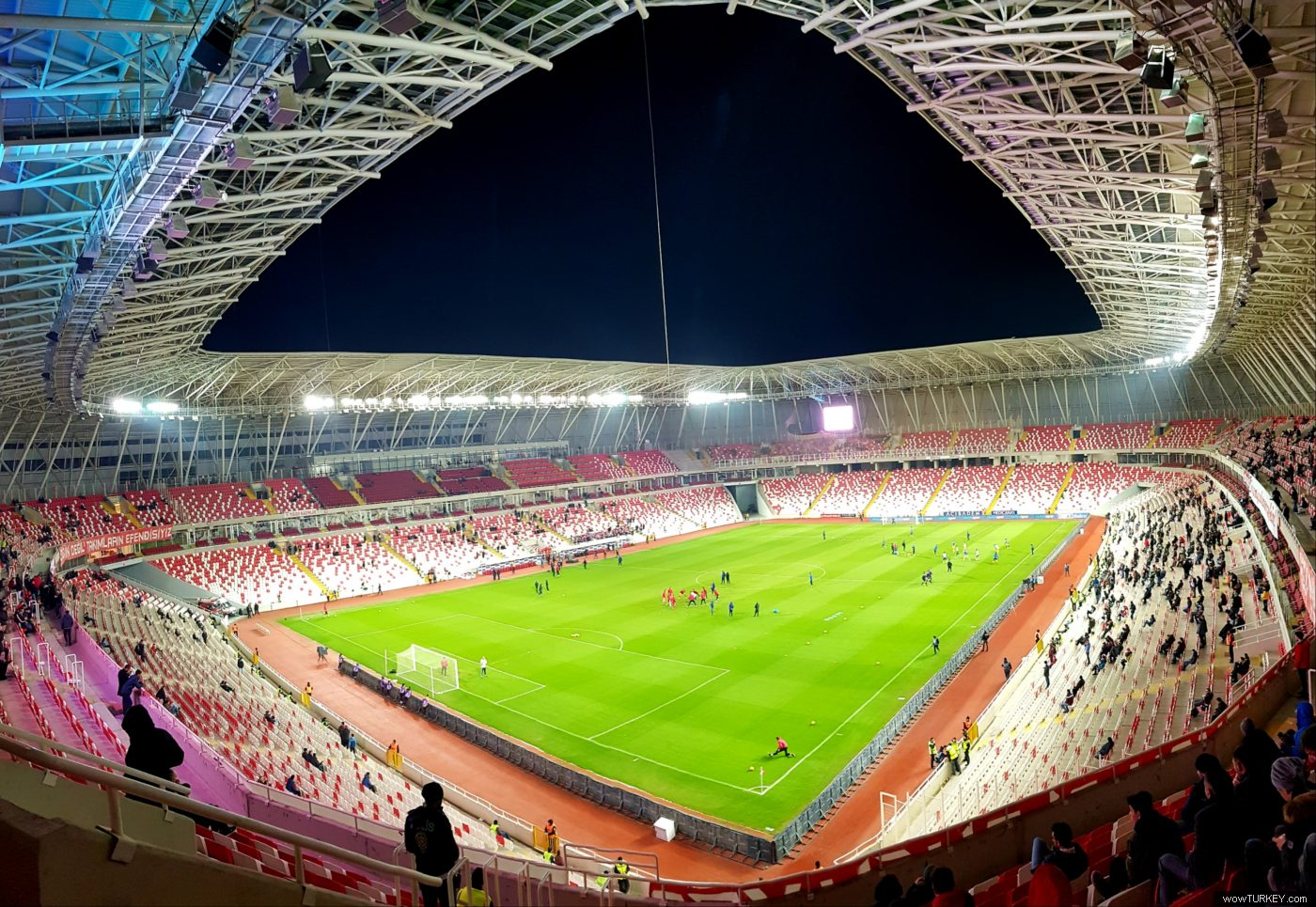
New Sivas 4 Eylül Stadium

Football is the most popular sport: in the older districts above the city centre children often kickballs around in the evenings in the smallest streets. The city's football club is Sivasspor, which plays its games at the New Sivas 4 Eylül Stadium. The club currently plays in TFF 1. Lig.

== Cuisine ==
Specialties of Sivas are tarhana (a soup made using sour yogurt), kelecos (a sour potato soup made with yoghurt) and katmer, a flaky pastry-bread which can be consumed on its own. One distinct feature of Sivas cooking is the use of madimak, which is a local herb used similarly to spinach. Sivas kebabı is a variety of kebab originating from Sivas, which is a mixture of meat and vegetables.

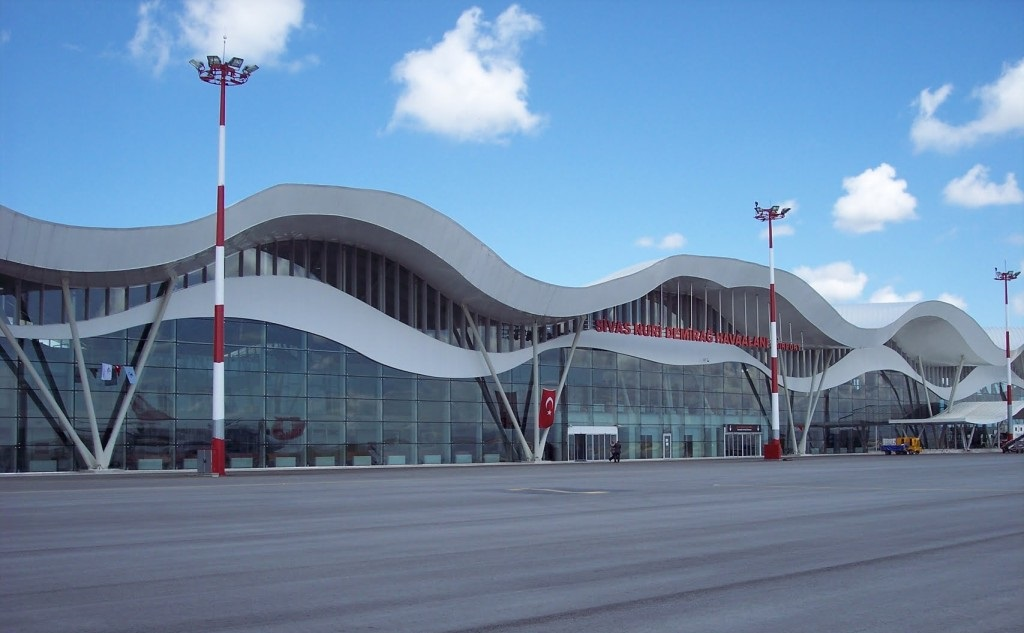
Sivas Airport

== Mayors of Sivas ==
- 1984–1989: Bekir Timurboğa (ANAP)
- 1989–1995: Temel Karamollaoğlu (Refah Party)
- 1995–2004: Osman Seçilmiş (Refah Party, Fazilet Party, Saadet Party)
- 2004–2009 and 2014: 2019–Sami Aydın (AK Party)
- 2009–2014: Doğan Ürgüp (BBP)
- 2019–2024: Hilmi Bilgin (AK Party)
- 2024–present: Adem Uzun (BBP)

== International relations ==
Sivas is twinned with:

- Grozny, Russia
- Gradačac, Bosnia and Herzegovina
- Adama, Ethiopia
- Baku, Azerbaijan
- Alicante, Spain
- Clermont-Ferrand, France

== See also ==
- List of people from Sivas
- Şifaiye Medrese
- Sivas Congress
- Kangal Dog
- Kangal Fish
- Divriği Great Mosque
- Rûm Eyalet
- Sivas massacre
