= Çifte Minareli Medrese, Sivas =

Madrasa in Sivas, Turkey

Çifte Minareli Medrese
- Turkish: Çifte Minareli Medrese
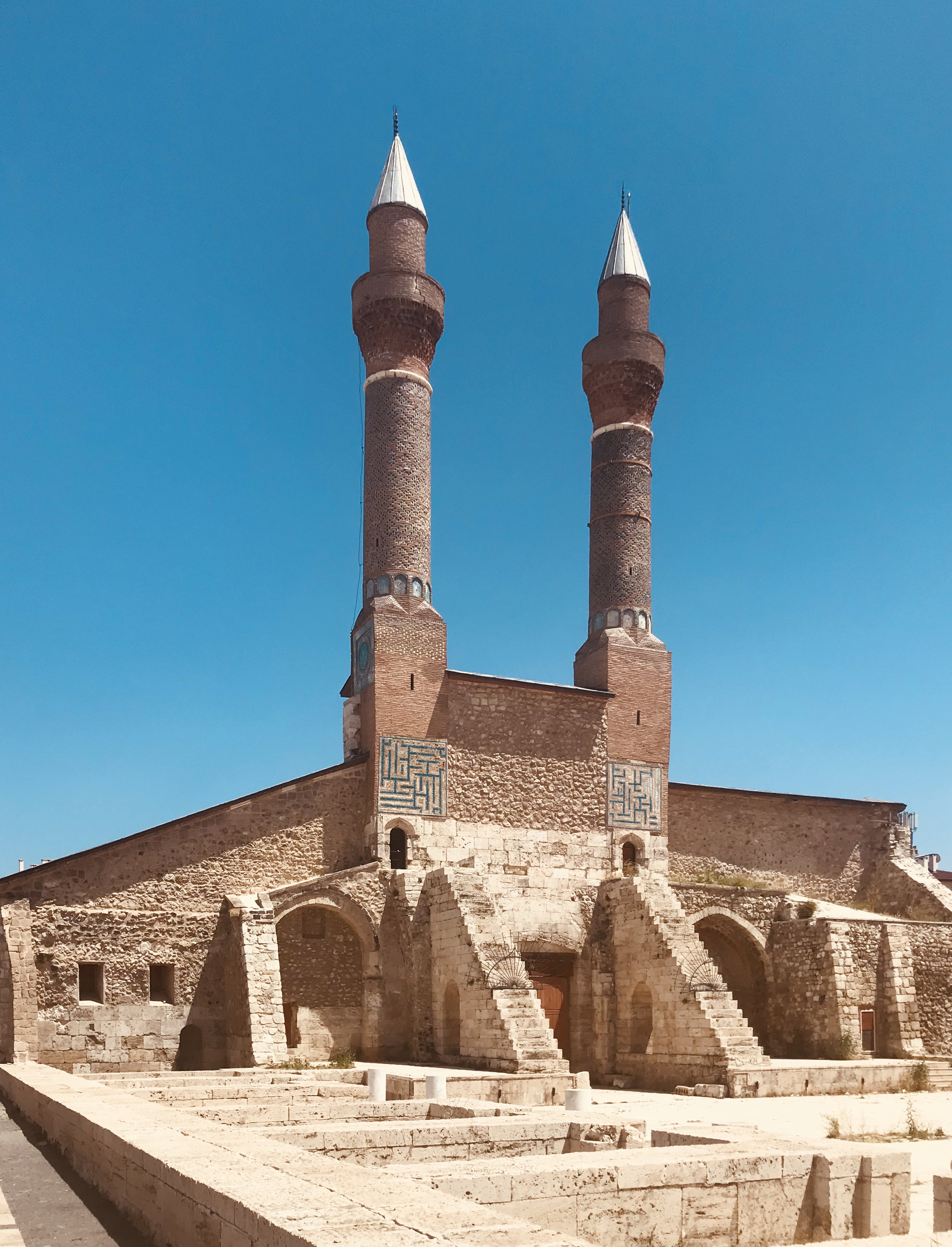

Location
- Sivas; Turkey
- 39°44′54″N 37°00′50.7″E

Information
- Type: madrasa
- Religious affiliation: Islam

Çifte Minareli Medrese (Turkish: Çifte Minareli Medrese), literally "Double Minaret Madrasah", is a former medrese located in Sivas, Turkey. It was built in 1271/72 and was commissioned by Shams al-Din Juvayni (Şemseddin Cüveynî, died 1284) an Ilkhanid vizier.

He left a dedicatory inscription on the building:

The construction of this blessed madrasa was ordered by the great statesman, the king of the viziers (ministers) of the world, Shams al-Dīn wa-l-Dunyā Muḥammad b. Muḥammad, the ṣāḥib dīwān, may God perpetuate his rule, in the year 670.

— Foundation inscription by Shams al-Din Juvayni, in AH 670 (1271-1272 CE).
