= 6th Chamber of Deputies of the Ottoman Empire =

History
- Founded: 12 January 1920
- Disbanded: 18 March 1920
- Preceded by: 5th Chamber of Deputies
- Succeeded by: 1st Grand National Assembly

Leadership
- President of the Chamber of Deputies: Reşat Hikmet (12 January – 28 Janury 1920); Celalettin Arif (4 March –18 March 1920)
- Seats: 168 deputies

Elections
- Voting system: Electoral college
- Last election: 1919
- Next election: 1920

Meeting place
- Ankara CUP headquarters

The Sixth Chamber of Deputies of the Ottoman Empire was elected in the 1919 Ottoman general election. The parliament served from 12 January to 18 March 1920.

Almost every single MP was associated with the Turkish National Movement. Significantly, Greeks and Armenians chose to boycott the election, as well as the Freedom and Accord Party. Therefore, many of MPs were former members of the Committee of Union and Progress, and every one was Muslim and identified as Turkish. The one exception was Jewish deputy Mişon Ventura.

Before taking their seats in the parliament in Constantinople, they were instructed by the Committee of Representation, led by Mustafa Kemal Pasha, to do the following: affiliate themselves with the Association for the Defense of Rights of Anatolia and Rumelia to better coordinate their activities, elect Mustafa Kemal as President of the Assembly, ratify the resolutions of the Sivas Congress, and pass a resolution in support of the National Pact. Though Mustafa Kemal was elected as an MP of Erzurum he stayed in Ankara.

Upon the assembly's convening, Kemal was angered when the MPs did not follow through with their instructions: he was not elected President of the Assembly, and the deputies instead founded the Felâh-ı Vatan Grubu (Salvation of the Homeland Group) to coordinate their own activities. Nevertheless, on 17 January 1920, the Chamber of Deputies unanimously adopted the National Pact. The Allies responded by forcefully dissolving the chamber on 16 March 1920, an event which coincided with an official occupation of Constantinople. While some MPs were arrested, many were reelected to a new parliament established in Ankara, out of the clutches of the Allies: the Grand National Assembly.

== List of members ==
Electoral district	Deputy
Amasya	Bekir Sami Bey (Kunduh)
Amasya	İsmail Hakkı Pasha
Amasya	Ömer Lütfi Bey (Yasan)
Ankara	Ahmed Rüstem Bey
Ankara	Taşpınarlı Hacı Atıf Efendi
Ankara	Ömer Mümtaz Bey (Tambi)
Ankara	Mustafa Hilmi Bey (Çayırlıoğlu)
Antep	Ali Cenani
Antep	Abdurrahman Hulusi Bey
Aydin	Abdülkadir Cami Bey (Baykurt)
Aydin	Hüseyin Kâzım Kadri Bey
Aydin	Mehmet Emin Bey (Erkut)
Bayazıt	Şefik Efendi (Baydar)
Bitlis	Sofrasur Asizade Resul Bey
Bitlis	Sadullah Fevzi Bey (Eren)
Bolu	Tunalı Hilmi Bey
Bolu	Cevat Abbas Bey (Gürer)
Bolu	Mehmed Vasfi Bey (Nuhoğlu)
Bolu	Ahmed Tayyar Efendi (Çulha)
Bozok (Yozgat)	İsmail Fazıl Pasha (Cebesoy)
Bozok (Yozgat)	Yusuf Bahri (Tatlıoğlu)
Burdur	Hüseyin Baki (Çelikbaş)
Bursa	Hasan Fehmi (Kolay)
Bursa	Osman Nuri (Özpay)
Bursa	İlyas Zühdi Efendi
Bursa	Ahmet Münir (Erhan)
Canik (Samsun)	Cavid Pasha
Canik (Samsun)	Mehmet Emin (Gevelioğlu)
Canik (Samsun)	Mehmet Ali Bey
Çorum	Abdullah İsmet (Eker)
Çatalca	Mahmud Hayrettin (Belli)
Denizli	Hakkı Behiç Bayiç (Note: Did not attend)
Denizli	Faik Efendi
Dersim	Hasan Hayri (Kanko)
Diyarbekir	Mehmet Zülfü (Tigrel) (Note: Did not attend)
Diyarbekir	Piriççizade Aziz Feyzi (Note: Did not attend)
Edirne	Mehmet Faik (Kaltakkıran)
Edirne	Mehmet Şeref (Aykut)
Edirne	Galip Bahtiyar (Göker)
Ergani	Kadri Bey (Note: Did not attend)
Ergani	Rüştü (Bulduk)
Ertuğrul (Bilecik)	Ahmet İffet (Mercimekoğlu)
Ertuğrul (Bilecik)	Mehmet Sadık
Erzincan	Halil Bey
Erzurum	Mustafa Kemal Pasha (Atatürk)
Erzurum	Celalettin Arif
Erzurum	Hüseyin Avni (Ulaş)
Erzurum	Süleyman Necati (Güneri)
Erzurum	Zihni (Orhon)
Eskişehir	Abdullah Azmi (Torun)
Eskişehir	Veliyullah (Akbaşlı)
Gelibolu	Celal Nuri (İleri)
Gelibolu	Mehmet Şakir (Kesebir)
Genç	Mehmet Celal (Saraçoğlu)
Gümüşhane	Kadirbeyoğlu Zeki
Hakkâri	Mazhar Müfit
Hakkâri	Asaf Süleyman (Doras)
Isparta	Cemal Pasha Mersinli
Isparta	Seyfullah Efendi
İçel	Ali Rıza (Ataışık)
İstanbul	Abdülhak Adnan (Adıvar)
İstanbul	Ahmet Ferit (Tek)
İstanbul	Ahmet Muhtar Mollaoğlu
İstanbul	Ahmed Selahaddin
İstanbul	Fuat Selim Bey (Note: Did not attend)
İstanbul	Hamit Hasancan
İstanbul	Kâmil Efendi
İstanbul	Mishon Ventura
İstanbul	Köstenceli Numan (Usta)
İstanbul	Rauf Ahmet (Hotinli)
İstanbul	Reşat Hikmet
İzmir	İbrahim Refet (Bele) (Note: Did not attend)
İzmir	Hasan Tahsin (Uzer)
İzmir	Yunus Nadi (Abalıoğlu)
İzmir	Mehmet Şükrü (Saracoğlu)
İzmir	İlhami (Dinçer)
İzmit	Ali (Dikmen)
İzmit	Hüseyin Sırrı (Bellioğlu)
İzmit	Sapancalı Hakkı
Kangırı (Çankırı)	Behçet (Kutlu)
Kangırı (Çankırı)	Hacı Tevfik (Durlanık)
Karahisar-ı Sâhib	"Kel" Ali Çetinkaya
Karahisar-ı Sâhib	Ömer Lütfi (Argeşo) (Note: Did not attend)
Karahisar-ı Sâhib	Mustafa Hulusi (Çalgüner)
Karahisar-ı Şarki	Fazıl Efendi
Karahisar-ı Şarki	Ömer Feyzi
Karesi (Balıkesir)	Hüseyin Hacim Muhittin (Çarıklı)
Karesi (Balıkesir)	Abdülaziz Mecdi (Tolun)
Karesi (Balıkesir)	Mehmet Fuat (Tuksal)
Karesi (Balıkesir)	Orhan Şemsettin Bey
Karesi (Balıkesir)	Rasim (Başara)
Kastamonu	Yusuf Kemal (Tengirşenk)
Kastamonu	Mehmet Besim (Fazlıoğlu)
Kastamonu	Suat (Soyer)
Kastamonu	Ahmet Şükrü (Bayındır)
Kayseri	Ahmet Hilmi (Kalaç) (Note: Did not attend)
Kayseri	Ahmet Rifat (Çalıka)
Kayseri	Ahmet Remzi (Akgöztürk) (Note: Resigned)
Kırk Kilise (Kırklareli)	Mehmed Bahaeddin Efendi
Kırk Kilise (Kırklareli)	Mustafa Arif (Deymer)
Kırşehir	Mehmet Rıza (Silsüpür)
Kırşehir	Benliağazade Ali Rıza
Konya	Hacı Bekir (Sümer)
Konya	Halil İbrahim (Nakıpoğlu)
Konya	Mehmet Vehbi (Çelik)
Konya	Musa Kazım (Onur)
Konya	Ömer Vehbi (Büyükyalvaç)
Kütahya	Ali Bey
Kütahya	Hocazade Ragıp (Soysal) (Note: Did not attend)
Kütahya	Rasih Efendi
Lazistan (Rize)	İsmailzade Osman Nuri (Özgen)
Lazistan (Rize)	Mustafa Asım (Lostar) (Note: Resigned)
Malatya	Mustafa Fevzi (Bilgili) (Note: Did not attend)
Malatya	Hacı Mehmed Rifat Efendi (Note: Did not attend)
Mamuret-ül-Aziz (Elazığ)	Muhittin (Çöteli)
Mamuret-ül-Aziz (Elazığ)	Mustafa Şükrü (Çağlayan)
Mamuret-ül-Aziz (Elazığ)	Dikbaşızade Hüseyin Avni Bey
Maraş	Abdülkadir Bey
Maraş	Mehmet Tahsin (Hüdayioğlu)
Mardin	Ebül'ulâ Mardin
Mardin	Midhat (Milli) (Note: Did not attend)
Menteşe (Muğla)	Mustafa Hilmi (Uran)
Menteşe (Muğla)	Halil İbrahim Efendi
Muş	İlyas Sami (Muş) (Note: Did not attend)
Muş	Osman Kadri (Bingöl)
Niğde	Mehmet Ataullah (Atalay)
Niğde	Erişirgil Mehmed Emin
Niğde	Muhittin Bey
Oltu	Haşimoğlu Yasin (Akdağ) (Note: Did not attend)
Oltu	Rüstem (Hamşioğlu) (Note: Did not attend)
Saruhan (Manisa)	Mahmud Celâleddin (Bayar)
Saruhan (Manisa)	İbrahim Süreyya (Yiğit)
Saruhan (Manisa)	Ahmet Muvaffak (Menemencioğlu)
Saruhan (Manisa)	Çerkes Reşid
Siirt	Halil Hulki (Aydın) (Note: Did not attend)
Sinop	Rıza Nur
Sinop	Zeki Bey
Sivas	Hüseyin Rauf (Orbay)
Sivas	Mustafa Vasıf (Karakol)
Sivas	Bacanakzade Mehmet Ziya (Note: Did not attend)
Sivas	Samih Fethi
Siverek	Bekir Sıtkı (Ocak)
Teke (Antalya)	Hamdullah Suphi (Tanrıöver)
Teke (Antalya)	Yusuf Talat (Note: Resigned)
Tekfurdağı (Tekirdağ)	Mehmet Rahmi
Tekfurdağı (Tekirdağ)	Süleyman Faik Bey
Tokat	Ahmet Bey
Tokat	Mehmet Bey
Tokat	Şevki Bey
Trabzon	Hüsrev (Gerede)
Trabzon	Ali Şükrü
Trabzon	Ahmed Muhtar (Çilli)
Trabzon	İsmail (Çamaş)
Trabzon	Ali Şefik (Başman)
Trabzon	Eşref (Dizdar)
Urfa	Ali Fuat (Bucak)
Urfa	Şükrü Nasıh Bey
Van	Hakkı (Ungan) (Note: Did not attend)
Van	Haydar Hilmi (Vaner)
Van	Münip (Boya)

== Sources ==
- Kayalı, Hasan (1995). "Elections and the Electoral Process in the Ottoman Empire, 1876-1919" (PDF). International Journal of Middle East Studies. 27 (3): 265–286. doi:10.1017/S0020743800062085. JSTOR 176251. S2CID 44470151 – via Cambridge University Press.
