= Renewal Party (Ottoman Empire) =

Renewal Party Teceddüt Fırkası
- Leader: Hüseyin Hüsnü Pasha; Ahmet Ferit Tek
- Founded: 11 November 1918
- Dissolved: 5 May 1919
- Preceded by: Committee of Union and Progress
- Headquarters: Istanbul
- Ideology: İttihadism (denied); Turkish nationalism

The Renewal Party (Ottoman Turkish: Teceddüt Fırkası) was a short-lived Ottoman political party.

Following the defeat of the Ottoman Empire in the World War I, the leaders of the governing party (CUP) fled the Ottoman Empire. During the party's last congress held on 1–5 November 1918, the remaining party members decided to abolish the party, which was severely criticized by the public because of the defeat. However, they also decided to form a new party with a different name.

The Renewal Party was founded on 11 November 1918. The assets of the Union and Progress Party were transferred to the new party. The party chairman became Hüsnü Pasha, a member of the Ottoman Senate. Although the party lost its former executive power after the war, it was briefly the majority group in the parliament. But on 21 December 1918, the sultan abolished the parliament. Although the party continued, on 5 May 1919 it was disbanded by the government.

Some members of the party like Hamit Hasancan and Mehmet Şeref Aykut joined the Turkish nationalists after it got dissolved, and served during the Turkish Republic as the Republican People's Party members. Some of them also took government offices like Tevfik Rüştü Aras as the Minister of Foreign Affairs between 1925 and 1938, Reşit Galip as the Minister of National Education between 1932–1933 and Şemsettin Günaltay as the Prime Minister between 1949–1950.
