= 1 March Memorandum =

Decision by the Turkish parliament concerning the Iraq War

1 March Memorandum (Turkish: 1 Mart Tezkeresi) or 1 March Motion, was a motion to join the Second Gulf War which was rejected by the Grand National Assembly of Turkey. It was taken up on 25 February 2003 and rejected by the parliament.

== Events ==
The United States counted on Turkey to join in its 2003 invasion of Iraq. A war plan was presented to Turkish Prime Minister Abdullah Gül by US Secretary of Defense Deputy Paul Wolfowitz on 3 December 2002.

"Sending the Turkish Armed Forces to Northern Iraq, as required, scope, limit and time to be determined by the government, which is responsible to the Supreme Assembly for ensuring national security and preparing the Armed Forces for homeland defense in accordance with Article 117 of the Constitution; in order to maintain an effective deterrence, these forces to be deployed in Northern Iraq are to be used in accordance with the principles to be determined when necessary, and to the Government to make the necessary arrangements for the air elements belonging to the foreign armed forces to use the Turkish airspace in accordance with the principles and rules to be determined by the Turkish authorities, within the framework of a possible military operation. In accordance with the 92nd article, it was requested to give permission for 6 months. In the memorandum, it was envisaged that a maximum of 62 thousand foreign military personnel would be in Turkey for 6 months. Air elements of foreign forces was not allowed to exceed 255 aircraft and 65 helicopters."

533 members of the Grand National Assembly participated in the voting. 264 votes in favor, 250 votes against and 19 votes of abstention were cast. Since 268 votes were needed for approval, the memorandum could not pass from the parliament, and was therefore rejected.

== Arguments in favor ==
In those times, there were 2 main political parties in the parliament: Justice and Development Party (AKP), and the Republican People's Party (CHP). Among those parties, AKP was mainly in favor of the memorandum, whereas CHP was against.

Those who supported the acceptance of the memorandum had 2 main arguments. They argued that Turkish relations with the US should not be damaged. America's plans would be disrupted and the US would be forced to change its invasion plans due to Turkey's critical geographical location and prior collaborations. American ships were already anchored at İskenderun Harbour, it can be said that USA was relying on Turkey as an ally in the region and expecting the motion to be passed by parliament.

The second main argument was that intervention in the region was an opportunity that if not seized, would leave Turkey in a disadvantageous position in which it would not be able to have a voice in the critical decisions in the region. Hence, it was claimed that Turkey could prevent a situation against its national interest only if Turkey was active in the region by passing the motion.

== Arguments against ==
One of the arguments against the memorandum was the military assets: helicopters, airplanes, and soldiers that were going to be allowed to freely traverse Turkey. Some claimed that these numbers would raise the question about whether Turkey will be America's next target after Iraq. Furthermore, many Turks believed it unnecessary for their country to sacrifice in a conflict which only seemed to be in America's national interest.

One of the most effective points against the motion was that Iraq was a majority Muslim country. Turkey's Muslim population opposed the memorandum for this reason. This concern especially impacted many of the Islamist AKP MPs, which defected to vote with the opposition CHP against joining the invasion. One of the effective speeches was given by Önder Sav, CHP Ankara MP:

" ...Now, for God's sake, tell me, which excuse should we believe? Which excuse is right and which one is true? Please, have a clear mind dear fellows. Otherwise, we do not see it possible to argue this memorandum.

Wolfowitz, Deputy Secretary of Defense of the United States, says that they are able to reach their goal with or without Turkey. So, let them succeed without Turkey. Stop following USA no matter how, but you do not stop! Unfortunately, soon, you will see very painfully that America ate the sugar apple and that the stalk will remain in Turkey's hands. (Applause from CHP desks)

In an anti-war action, a very appropriate slogan caught my eye; I want to repeat it here, to have it recorded. “Do not be afraid of the United States of America, fear God, God!” says that slogan...(Applause from CHP desks)"

== Reactions ==
From American perspective, this decision from parliament was unexpected. The US planned the operation assuming Turkey would join in. After the rejection of the 1 March motion the US had to change their strategy to a more expensive and inconvenient one. The operation was prolonged and USA had to rely more on its own resources. Furthermore, the US had to send their ships to the Gulf region, which was more logistically burdensome.

In his book Decision Points, George W. Bush, used the sentence "Our NATO ally Turkey had let America down in one of our most important requests to date." to describe his feelings.

On the other side, Turkey's standing in the Islamic world was enhanced. Many Turks and even AKP voters were satisfied with this result. Furthermore, some considered this rejection as a big step in order to overcome their deference to the United States in their foreign policy.
