= 1920 Turkish Grand National Assembly election =

- 1920

436 seats in the Grand National Assembly 218 seats needed for a majority
Elected Speaker
Mustafa Kemal Atatürk
ARMHC

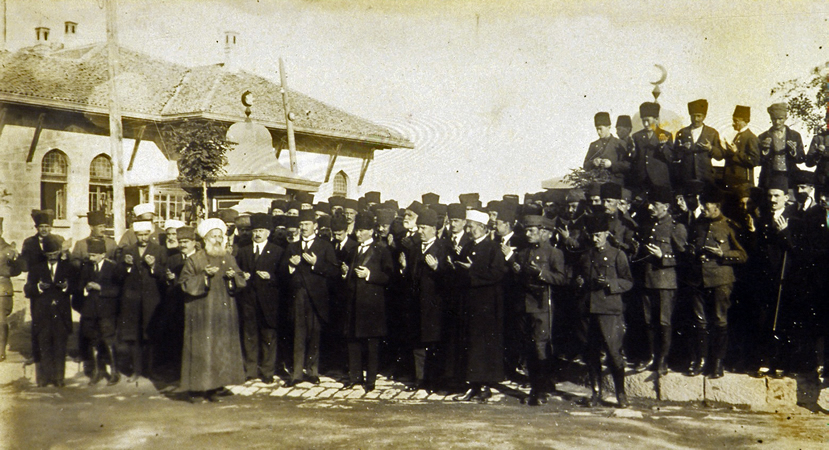
Prayers in front of the Grand National Assembly building in Ankara, 1920.

General elections were held in the Ottoman Empire in 1920 in order to select delegates to the new Grand National Assembly. The elections were dominated by the Association for the Defense of the Rights of Anatolia and Rumelia (Turkish: Anadolu ve Rumeli Müdafaa-i Hukuk Cemiyeti), which consisted of nationalist local groups protesting against the Allied occupation of Turkey.

== Background ==
Following the 1919 general elections, the newly elected Parliament convened in Istanbul on 12 January 1920. However, its approval of the Misak-ı Millî (National Pact) led to Allied forces occupying the city on 16 March. Several MPs were arrested and deported. Sultan Mehmed VI dissolved Parliament on 11 April.

After Istanbul was occupied, Mustafa Kemal, the leader of the Turkish National Movement, sent a telegram to the provincial administrations and army commanders on 19 March as the head of the Committee of Representation, asking them to hold elections for the Grand National Assembly and to complete the elections within 15 days. The circular contained a total of 12 articles, which included:

- A parliament with extraordinary powers shall be convened in Ankara to manage and supervise the affairs of the country
- The persons to be elected as members of this assembly shall be subject to the provisions of the law relating to members of parliament
- Elections shall be based on sanjaks
- Five members shall be elected from each sanjak
- The elections shall be completed within fifteen days at the latest in such a way as to ensure a majority in Ankara

The circular also stated that the participation of the members of the last Chamber of Deputies, which had been disbanded, who could come to Ankara was obligatory.

The circular differed from the electoral law that was in effect from the 1908 elections until the 1943 elections. The principle of electing deputies based on population was abandoned and five members were to be elected from each sanjak regardless of population. The election age, which had been set at 30 as per the 1876 Constitution, was lowered to 25 with the circular. Due to the extraordinary circumstances, the circular determined a special election method as in the 1877 elections.

== Aftermath ==
Following the elections, the new Grand National Assembly met in Ankara on 23 April 1920, with Mustafa Kemal as its chairman.
