= New Republican People's Party =

Term to describe the ideological shift of the Republican People's Party in Turkey

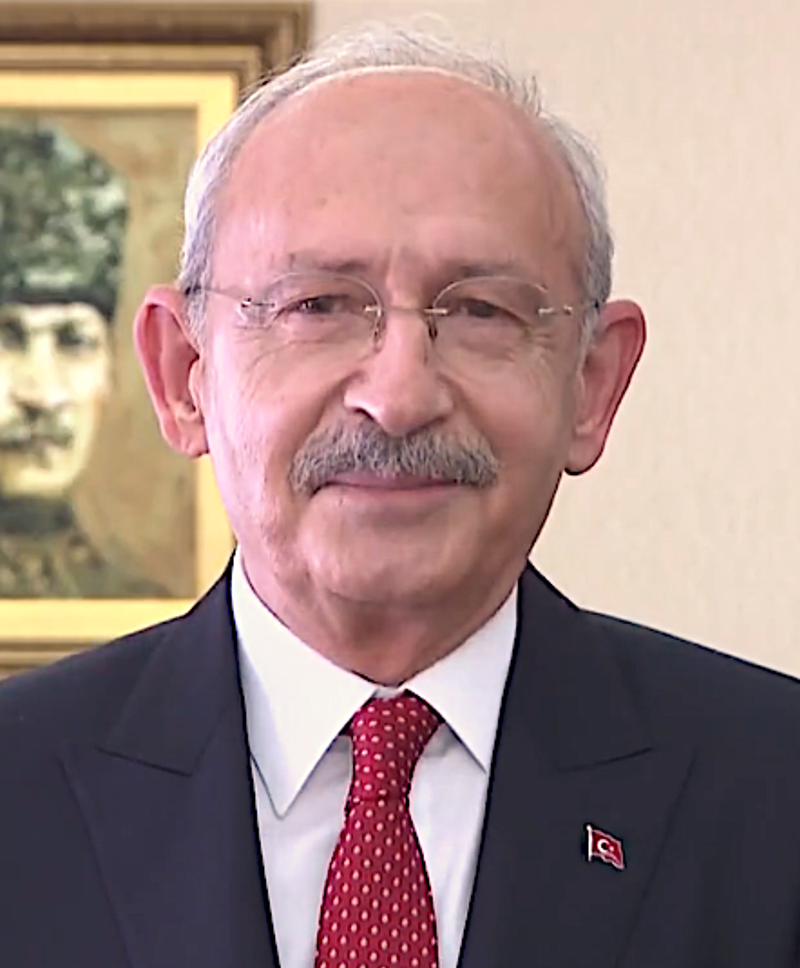
Kemal Kılıçdaroğlu in 2023

The New Republican People's Party (Turkish: Yeni Cumhuriyet Halk Partisi), New CHP (Yeni CHP), or YCHP, is a term used to describe the ideological shift of the Republican People's Party, especially during the tenure of Kemal Kılıçdaroğlu, who was the leader of the party from 2010 to 2023.

== History ==
The CHP participated in the 2002 Turkish general elections under the leadership of Deniz Baykal and became one of the two parties that exceeded the 10% threshold with the AKP. The AKP promised to democratize the country, make Turkey a full member of the European Union, adopt a new free market economy, and to achieve full rights for the Kurdish minority. This inspired factions of the CHP to do the same as to counter the AKP. The SHP faction of the Kemalists, which did not agree with much of Deniz Baykal's policies and had a much more liberal policy, formed the basis of the ideological shift. When the CHP performed poorly in the 2004 local elections, 30 CHP deputies, who were disturbed by Deniz Baykal and his management of the CHP, including Muharrem İnce and Kemal Kılıçdaroğlu, established a movement called "CHP's March to Power" and issued a statement. This movement was later called the "30s Movement". An electional congress was later held, in which Baykal lost his power and Kılıçdaroğlu was elected in 2010.

The CHP, which was established by Mustafa Kemal Atatürk and was famous for its hardline Turkish nationalism, as well as its role in developing Turkish nationalism, began to loosen up on the nationalism under Kemal Kılıçdaroğlu. The CHP further liberalised on many other factors, and became much more inclusive, accepting people regardless of religion, language, race, gender, ethnicity, belief and ideology. Kılıçdaroğlu also attempted to appease Kurdish voters. In 2012, Kılıçdaroğlu used the phrase "Y-CHP" for the first time when announcing the new management staff. In a statement described as a derogatory reference against Baykal and Sav, Kılıçdaroğlu said "when we say CHP, we forgot the past, we reject the thought that we established a CHP again. There is no such thought. What we mean by the New CHP is the new management of the CHP. This administration is the administration in favor of the people, this administration is a libertarian administration that resists fears. It is an administration that brings freedom. No one but no one will move us to an area outside of freedom and law."

In the 2011 elections, deputies with different views on the Kurdish issue, headscarf issue, and economic issue were elected into the CHP, further diversifying it. Although Kılıçdaroğlu emphasised for more reform, secularism remained a main policy of the CHP, while the Turkish ethnic nationalism shifted into a leftist civic nationalism.

Kemal Kılıçdaroğlu made a speech in the Grand National Assembly of Turkey on November 16, 2021. He promised reforms, and the speech had unofficially become one of the symbols of the New CHP.

After the loss of the 2023 Turkish presidential, Özgür Özel and a few party leaders, including Ekrem İmamoğlu, started a movement against the perceived authoritarianism of Kemal Kılıçdaroğlu, and ended his tenure, electing Özel in late 2023.

== Nationalist backlash ==
Kılıçdaroğlu's reforms were met with opposition mainly from hardline Kemalists, who emphasized on nationalism and secularism, and were concerned that the principles of Atatürk were not being respected, and were also worried that the CHP was becoming tolerant of Kurdish separatists.

The reforms of the CHP had also been criticized by various nationalist, ulusalist, and idealist factions. Many politicians of the CHP left the party as well. The CHP was also accused of drifting too far away from Atatürk's ideology and being unrecognisable compared to the original CHP.
