= Social Democrat Party (Ottoman Empire) =

Social Democrat Party Sosyal Demokrat Fırkası
- Leader: Hasan Rıza
- General Secretary: Yorgaki Habib
- Last Leader: Mehmet Atıf Tüzün
- Founded: December 22, 1918
- Dissolved: 1919
- Headquarters: 104 Kebir St. Şişli, Istanbul
- Ideology: Fourteen Points; Ottomanism; Social democracy Representative democracy
- Political position: Left-wing

The Social Democrat Party (Turkish: Sosyal Demokrat Fırkası) was a short-lived social democratic political party in the Ottoman Empire, founded in the aftermath of the First World War.

It was a member of the Second International. It sent a representative to the Sultanate Council, a faux-parliament organized by Mehmed VI and Damat Ferid Pasha in between the dissolution of the 5th parliament in 1918 and the 1919 general election. The party failed to win representation in the 1919 election.

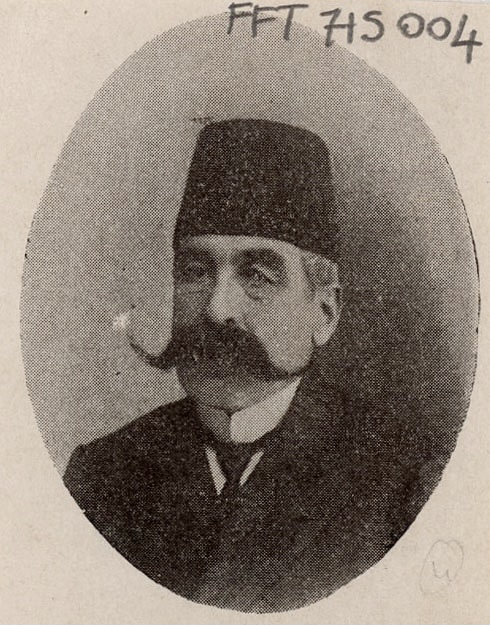
Vehbi Bey, one of the founders
