= Refet Bele =

Turkish general (1881-1963)

İbrahim Refet Bele 1314-P. 39

Minister of National Defence
- In office 5 August 1921 – 10 January 1922
- Preceded by: Fevzi Çakmak
- Succeeded by: Kazım Özalp

Minister of the Interior
- In office 30 June 1921 – 10 October 1921
- Preceded by: Ata Atalay
- Succeeded by: Fethi Okyar

Minister of the Interior
- In office 6 September 1920 – 18 March 1921
- Preceded by: Nâzım Resmor
- Succeeded by: Ata Atalay

Member of the Grand National Assembly of Turkey
- In office 1935–1950
- Constituency: Istanbul

Member of the Grand National Assembly of Turkey
- In office 1920 – 1 November 1926
- Constituency: İzmir (1920–1923); Istanbul (1923–1926)

Personal details
- Born: 1881 Thessaloniki, Ottoman Empire (modern Greece)
- Died: 3 October 1963 (aged 81–82) Istanbul, Turkey
- Resting place: Zincirlikuyu Mezarlığı
- Education: Ottoman Military College

Military service
- Allegiance: Ottoman Empire; Turkey
- Branch/service: Ottoman Army; Turkish Army
- Years of service: Ottoman Empire: 1899–1919; Turkey: 13 July 1919 – 8 December 1926
- Rank: Major general
- Commands: Division of the intelligence of the headquarters of the Fourth Army, 10th Division, 3rd Division, 11th Division, Inspector of the Rear Area of Jerusalem, 53rd Division, XXII Corps (deputy), XX Corps, Gendarmerie General Command, III Corps
- Battles/wars: Italo-Turkish War; Balkan Wars: First World War; Sinai and Palestine campaign; Battle of Romani; Second Battle of Gaza; Battle of Megiddo (1918); Turkish War of Independence; Battle of Aslıhanlar–Dumlupınar; Greek resistance during the Greek genocide

İbrahim Refet Bele (1881 – 3 October 1963), also known as Refet Bey or Refet Pasha was a Turkish military commander. He served in the Ottoman Army and the Turkish Army, where he retired as a general.

== Life ==
He was born to a Turkish family in Selanik, Ottoman Empire (modern Thessaloniki, Greece) in 1881. He took the surname Bele because of his grandfather who was originally from Byala/Bele, Bulgaria. Because of the troubles in the Balkans his family moved first to Istanbul but settled later back to Thessaloniki when he was an infant. He studied in the Ottoman Military College, enrolled in the army and became a member of the Committee of Union and Progress. He took part in the Italo-Turkish War (1911) and then in the First Balkan War (1912–1913) in which his hometown was lost to the Greeks.

He took part in World War I where he fought in the rank of a Lieutenant Colonel under the command of Kress von Kressenstein in the Battle of Romani where the Ottoman forces were defeated. In the Palestine front and during the Second battle of Gaza he served with distinction. First refusing a surrender and then successfully organizing the withdrawal of the Ottoman and German forces with their weaponry. Nevertheless, Bele was blamed together with İsmet (İnönü) for the defeat of the Ottomans by Erich Von Falkenhayn. After the British advance in 1918 he was cut off by his troops but managed to reach the Ottoman base at Tyre 75 miles north, after traveling one week through British lines. He did not speak English but because he moved at night and responded to questions with saluting and riding on a walk he avoided being captured. He returned to Istanbul after the Armistice of Mudros in 1918.

While in Istanbul, most of Anatolia began to be occupied by foreign powers, the Greeks landed at İzmir in 1919. In response to the occupation he decided to join the Turkish nationalist movement and crossed over to Anatolia to organize resistance and join the Turkish War of Independence which was being led by Atatürk. He took part in the Amasya Circular of 1919 and then also in the Erzurum Congress, Alaşehir Congress and Sivas Congress. He later served as minister and later as commander at the Western Front against the Greek armies. He put down several local revolts against the Ankara government. He served as Minister of the Interior from 6 September 1920 until his resignation on 18 March 1921, which was announced to the Grand National Assembly of Turkey on 21 March.

In April 1921, Bele commanded the Turkish forces at the Battle of Aslıhanlar–Dumlupınar, where his offensive was repulsed by the Greeks, damaging his military reputation and causing him to get recalled to Ankara. He was re-elected Minister of the Interior on 30 June 1921. During the Pontic Greek genocide, in July 1921, he upheld Nureddin Pasha's orders for the deportation of Pontic Greeks from Ordu, including women, children and the elderly, despite opposition from the district's administrator, Ahmet Faik (Günday), who noted that no Greek guerrilla bands ever operated in his district. The latter resigned on 22 July, refusing to implement Nureddin's and Bele's orders also calling them "criminal". His successor, Küşad Bey, ended up deporting Greek families from rural villages, but, due to Faik's own resistance, the families from Ordu's cities and towns were spared from this "bloody" operation.

On 5 August 1921, he was appointed Minister of National Defence. He resigned on 10 January 1922.

Later, he had several political disputes with Mustafa Kemal Atatürk. He was tried in court but acquitted of the attempted assassination of Atatürk in 1926. In the same year, he retired from both the army and the parliament. However, Bele reconciled with Atatürk in the 1930s and returned to parliament in 1935 with Atatürk's personal support.

He served as an MP until 1950, after which he retired and died in Istanbul in 1963.

== See also ==
- List of high-ranking commanders of the Turkish War of Independence
