= Celalettin Arif =

Turkish politician

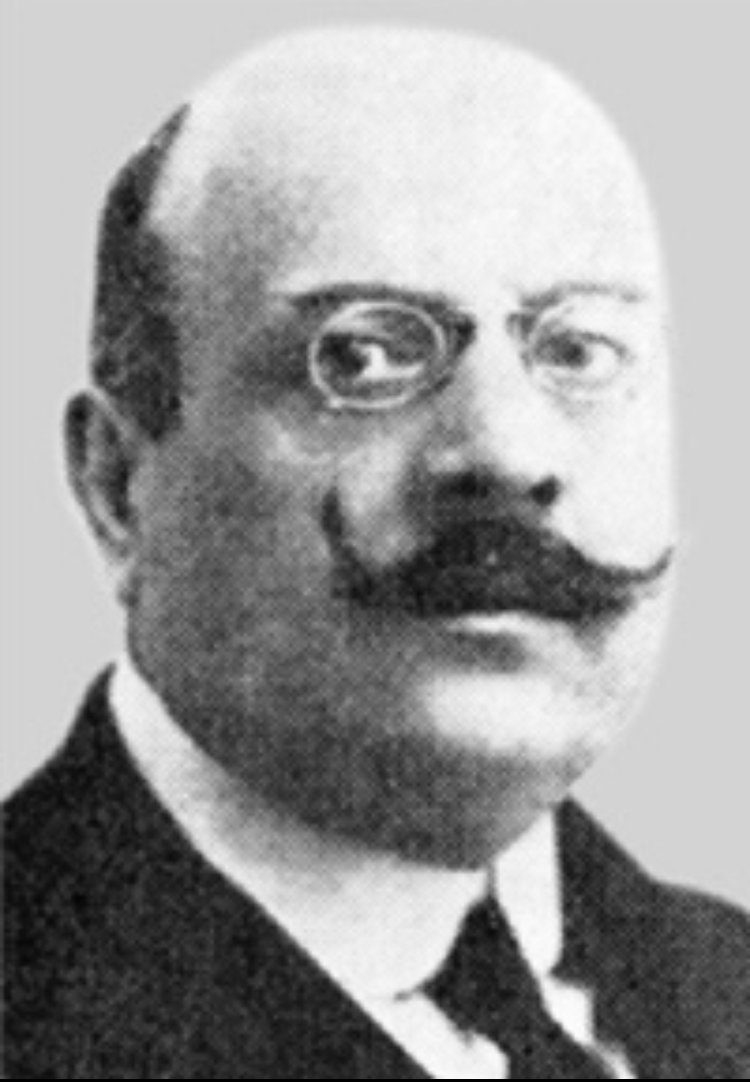
- 1920s

Minister of Justice
- In office 3 May 1920 – 30 March 1921
- Succeeded by: Yusuf Kemal Tengirşenk

Ambassador to Italy
- In office 1922–1923

Personal details
- Born: Celalettin Arif; 1875 Erzurum, Ottoman Empire
- Died: 1930 (aged 54–55) Paris, France
- Education: Law, political science
- Alma mater: Galatasaray High School, University of Paris
- Occupation: Lawyer, academic, politician

Celalettin Arif (1875–1930) was a Turkish lawyer, politician, academic, government minister and diplomat.

== Early years ==
Celalettin Arif was born to Mehmet Arif in Erzurum, Ottoman Empire in 1875. After finishing the Soğukçeşme Military Middle School in Istanbul and Galatasaray High School, he studied law and political science in Paris, France. Between 1901 and 1908, he worked as a lawyer in Cairo, Egypt. Returned to Istanbul, he taught law and political science in colleges. From 1914 to 1920, he served as the conseil chairman of the Bar of Istanbul. He co-founded the political party "Osmanlı Ahrar Fıkrası" ("Ottoman Liberty Party"), and was elected as a deputy from Istanbul into the Ottoman parliament in its 4th legislative term. On March 4, 1920, he was elected parliament speaker that lasted only a brief time as the parliament was disbanded on 5 April 1920 by the Allied troops during the occupation of Istanbul.

== Turkish War of Independence and Republican era ==
After the closing of the Ottoman parliament, he moved to Anatolia. During the efforts of the War of Independence led by Mustafa Kemal Pasha, Celalettin Arif joined the Government of the Grand National Assembly in Ankara. He entered the parliament, established on 23 April 1920, as the deputy of Erzurum. He was elected the vice speaker of the parliament. He served as Minister of Justice in the 1st and the 2nd cabinet of the Executive Ministers of Turkey between 3 May 1920 and 30 March 1921. In 1922, he was appointed ambassador to Italy. Celalettin Arif died in Paris in 1928.

Political offices
Preceded by Newly established	Minister of Justice; 3 May 1920 – 30 March 1921	Succeeded by Yusuf Kemal Tengirşenk
Preceded by Osman Nizami Pasha	Ambassador of Turkey to Italy; 1922–1923	Succeeded by Hilmi Bey
