= 1919 Ottoman general election =

- 1919

168 seats in the Chamber of Deputies

General elections were held in the Ottoman Empire in 1919, the last official elections held in the Empire. Due to the dearth of political parties, the elections were dominated by the Association for Defence of National Rights (A-RMHC), which consisted of nationalist local groups protesting against the Allied occupation of Turkey.

== Background ==
Called on 22 October 1919 under the Amasya Protocol agreement between the Ottoman government and the Turkish National Movement in Ankara, the elections followed the end of World War I and the defeat of the Empire. The disbanding of the Committee of Union and Progress (CUP) led to the creation of several parties previously banned or repressed under the CUP regime, including the reformation of the Freedom and Accord Party. However, Freedom and Accord did not take a role in the elections in the face of the Defence of Rights Association groups supporting resistance against the Allies.

== Aftermath ==
The newly elected Parliament convened in Istanbul (contrary to the Amasya Protocol, which had called for it to convene outside of Istanbul) on 12 January 1920. However, its approval of the Misak-ı Millî (National Pact) with the Turkish revolutionaries in Ankara led to Allied forces occupying Istanbul on 16 March. Several MPs were arrested and deported. Sultan Mehmed VI dissolved Parliament on 11 April.

After this, the Allies did not allow new Ottoman governments to form in support of the Turkish revolutionaries in, which meant that Ottoman officials participating in government after 11 April 1920 were collaborating with the Allies against the Ankara government.

== See also ==
- 6th Chamber of Deputies of the Ottoman Empire
