= İbrahim Süreyya Yiğit =

Turkish politician

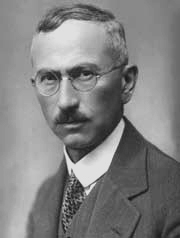

Member of the Grand National Assembly

Personal details
- Born: 1880 Constantinople, Ottoman Empire
- Died: 4 November 1952 (aged 71–72)

İbrahim Süreyya Yiğit (1880 – 4 November 1952) was a Turkish thinker, politician and a close friend of Mustafa Kemal Atatürk. He was the only civilian signatory to the Amasya Declaration and participated in the Erzurum and Sivas Congresses. He served as a Member of the Turkish Grand National Assembly from 1923 until 1950. His surname of Yigit was personally given by Atatürk.
