= Hamit Hasancan =

Turkish politician (1870–1943)

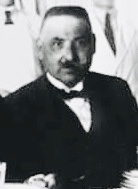

Personal details
- Born: 1870 Constantinople, Ottoman Empire
- Died: 1943 (aged 72–73) Istanbul, Turkey

Hamit Hasancan (1870–1943) was a Turkish economist and conservative politician, who was an early, key member of the Republican People's Party.
