= Suat Soyer =

Turkish politician

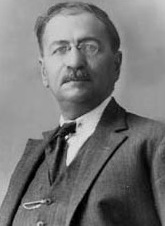

Member of the Grand National Assembly

Personal details
- Born: 1879 İzmir, Ottoman Empire
- Died: 1942 (aged 62–63)

Suat Soyer (1879–1942) was a Turkish physician and liberal politician.
