= Mehmet Şeref Aykut =

Turkish politician

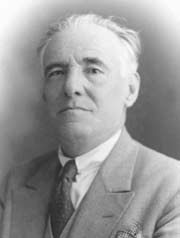

Member of the Grand National Assembly

Personal details
- Born: 1874 Edirne, Ottoman Empire
- Died: 18 May 1939 (aged 64–65)
- Party: CHP

Mehmet Şeref Aykut (1874 – 18 May 1939) was a Turkish politician, who was an early key member of both the Turkish National Movement and the CHP.
