= Ata Atalay =

Turkish politician

Mehmet Ataullah Bey
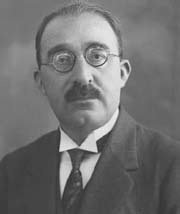

Personal details
- Born: 1882 Nevşehir, Ottoman Empire
- Died: 1933 (aged 50–51)
- Party: Social Democrat Party

Mehmet Ataullah Bey, also known as Ata Atalay (1882–1933) was a politician and a member of the last Ottoman Parliament in 1920.
