= İskenderun Harbor =

- Native name: İskenderun Limanı

Location
- Location: İskenderun, Hatay, Turkey

İskenderun Harbor is a Mediterranean harbor of Turkey. It is at 36°35′N 36°11′E in İskenderun, Hatay Province.

== History ==
The harbor project goes back to 1911 when the construction was planned by the port administration of Haydarpaşa during the Ottoman Empire. But because of the First World War difficulties, the project could not be realized. The inner harbor was constructed by the French government between 1918-1937 when the city of İskenderun was under French rule. After the proclamation of the Hatay Republic and the merging to Turkey in 1939, the harbor was incorporated into the Turkish State Port Authorities. The harbor was rebuilt and enlarged in 1953, 1956, 1964 and 1972. On 20 December 2004 the infrastructure was handed over to Limak Company as part of the privatization program.

A large fire broke out at the port on 6 February 2023 after a magnitude 7.8 earthquake. The port received extensive structural damage and operations ceased in the immediate aftermath of the earthquake. Many shipping containers also toppled during the earthquake; the blaze was thought to have been started by a toppled container.

== Technical details ==
The total area is 1 square kilometre (0.39 sq mi). Number of berths is 8. Container berth water depth is 15.5 metres (51 ft). The total length of the berths is 920 metres (3,020 ft).

== See also ==
- İskenderun railway station
- Mersin Harbor
