= Republican People's Party =

Social democratic political party in Turkey

Republican People's Party Cumhuriyet Halk Partisi
- Abbreviation: CHP
- Leader: Kemal Kılıçdaroğlu
- Secretary-General: Rıfat Turuntay Nalbantoğlu
- Spokesman: Müslim Sarı
- Parliamentary leader: Faik Öztrak
- Founder: Mustafa Kemal Atatürk
- Founded: 9 September 1923; 103 years ago (as a political party) 9 September 1992; 34 years ago (re-establishment and current form)
- Banned: 16 October 1981; 45 years ago (re-established in 1992)
- Preceded by: Committee of Union and Progress (de facto); Association for the Defence of the Rights of Anatolia and Rumelia
- Succeeded by: Populist Party (1983–1985); Social Democracy Party (1983–1985); Democratic Left Party (1985–present)
- Headquarters: Anadolu Bulvarı No: 12, Çankaya, Ankara
- Student wing: Halk-Lis (Halkçı Liseliler)
- Youth wing: CHP Youth
- Women's wing: CHP Kadın Kolları
- NGO: Atatürkist Thought Association (unofficial); SODEV (unofficial)
- Membership (2026): ▼1,879,973
- Ideology: Social democracy; Kemalism; Factions: Ulusalcı nationalism Social liberalism Democratic socialism
- Political position: Centre-left
- National affiliation: Nation Alliance (2018–2023)
- European affiliation: Party of European Socialists (suspended)
- International affiliation: Progressive Alliance (2013–present); Socialist International (1995–present, suspended); Historical: Radical International (associate) (1929–1938)
- Colors: Red; White
- Slogan: Our work is Türkiye
- Grand National Assembly: 44 / 600
- Metropolitan municipalities: 5 / 30
- Provinces: 1 / 51
- District municipalities: 87 / 922
- Belde Municipalities: 15 / 390
- Provincial councilors: 0 / 1,282
- Municipal Assemblies: 0 / 20,953

Party flag

Website
- chp.org.tr

The Republican People's Party (Turkish: Cumhuriyet Halk Partisi [dʒumhuːɾiˈjet haɫk 'paɾtisi], CHP [dʒeːheːpeˑ]) is a centre-left, social democratic and Kemalist political party in Turkey. It is the oldest political party in Turkey, founded by Mustafa Kemal Atatürk, the first president and founder of the modern Republic of Turkey. The party is also cited as the founding party of modern Turkey. Its logo consists of the Six Arrows, which represent the foundational principles of Kemalism: republicanism, reformism, laicism, populism, nationalism, and etatism. It is currently the fifth largest party in the Grand National Assembly with 45 MPs.

The political party has its origins in the various resistance groups founded during the Turkish War of Independence, with most members being previously associated with the Committee of Union and Progress. Under the leadership of Mustafa Kemal Atatürk, these groups united at the 1919 Sivas Congress. Founded as the 'People's Party' in 1923, the organisation adopted the prefix 'Republican' shortly after the proclamation of the Republic. Under Atatürk's first presidency, the party oversaw the establishment of the Turkish Republic. As Turkey moved into its authoritarian one-party period, the CHP became the primary apparatus for implementing far-reaching political, cultural, social, and economic reforms across the country.

After World War II, Atatürk's successor, İsmet İnönü, allowed for multi-party elections, and the party initiated a peaceful transition of power after losing the 1950 election, ending the one-party period and beginning Turkey's multi-party period. The years following the 1960 military coup saw the party gradually trend towards the center-left, which was cemented once Bülent Ecevit became chairman in 1972. The CHP, along with all other political parties of the time, was banned by the military junta of 1980. The CHP was re-established with its original name by Deniz Baykal on 9 September 1992, with the participation of a majority of its members from the pre-1980 period. From 2002 to 2026 it was the main opposition party to the ruling Justice and Development Party (AK Party). In May 2026, Kemal Kılıçdaroğlu was re-appointed as chairman via a controversial court order, invalidating the previous party congress that resulted in Özgür Özel becoming chairman. After accusing the Kılıçdaroğlu party administration of turning the CHP into controlled opposition, Özel founded the New Party, to which a majority of CHP MPs defected. The New Party became the largest opposition party in Turkey following these defections.

CHP is an associate member of the Party of European Socialists (PES), a member of the Socialist International, and the Progressive Alliance. Many politicians of CHP have declared their support for LGBT rights and the feminist movement in Turkey. The party is pro-European and supports Turkish membership to European Union and NATO. The party also fully supports the enlargement of the European Union and NATO.

== History ==
=== Establishment: 1919–1923 ===
The Republican People's Party has its origins in the resistance organizations, known as Defence of Rights Associations, created in the immediate aftermath of World War I in the Turkish War of Independence. In the Sivas Congress, Mustafa Kemal Pasha (Atatürk) and his colleagues united the Defence of Rights Associations into the Association for the Defence of National Rights of Anatolia and Rumelia (Anadolu ve Rumeli Müdâfaa-i Hukuk Cemiyeti) (A–RMHC), and called for elections in the Ottoman Empire to elect representatives associated with the organization. The CHP, which regards itself the successor to the A–RMHC, considers the Sivas Congress its inaugural party congress. Most members of the A–RMHC were previously Young Turks associated with the Committee of Union and Progress, and veterans of the tumultuous politics of the Second Constitutional Era.

After the forced dissolution of the Chamber of Deputies, A–RMHC members proclaimed the Grand National Assembly as a counter government from Istanbul, which was appeasing the Allied powers. After Grand National Assembly forces militarily defeated Greece, France, and Armenia, they overthrew the Ottoman government and abolished the monarchy. After the 1923 election, the A–RMHC was transformed into a political party called the People's Party (Halk Fırkası) soon changing its name to Republican People's Party (Cumhuriyet Halk Fırkası, and then Cumhuriyet Halk Partisi) (CHP). With a united parliament, the republic was proclaimed with Atatürk as its first president, the Treaty of Lausanne was ratified, and the Caliphate was abolished the next year.

=== One-party period: 1923–1950 ===
==== Atatürk era ====
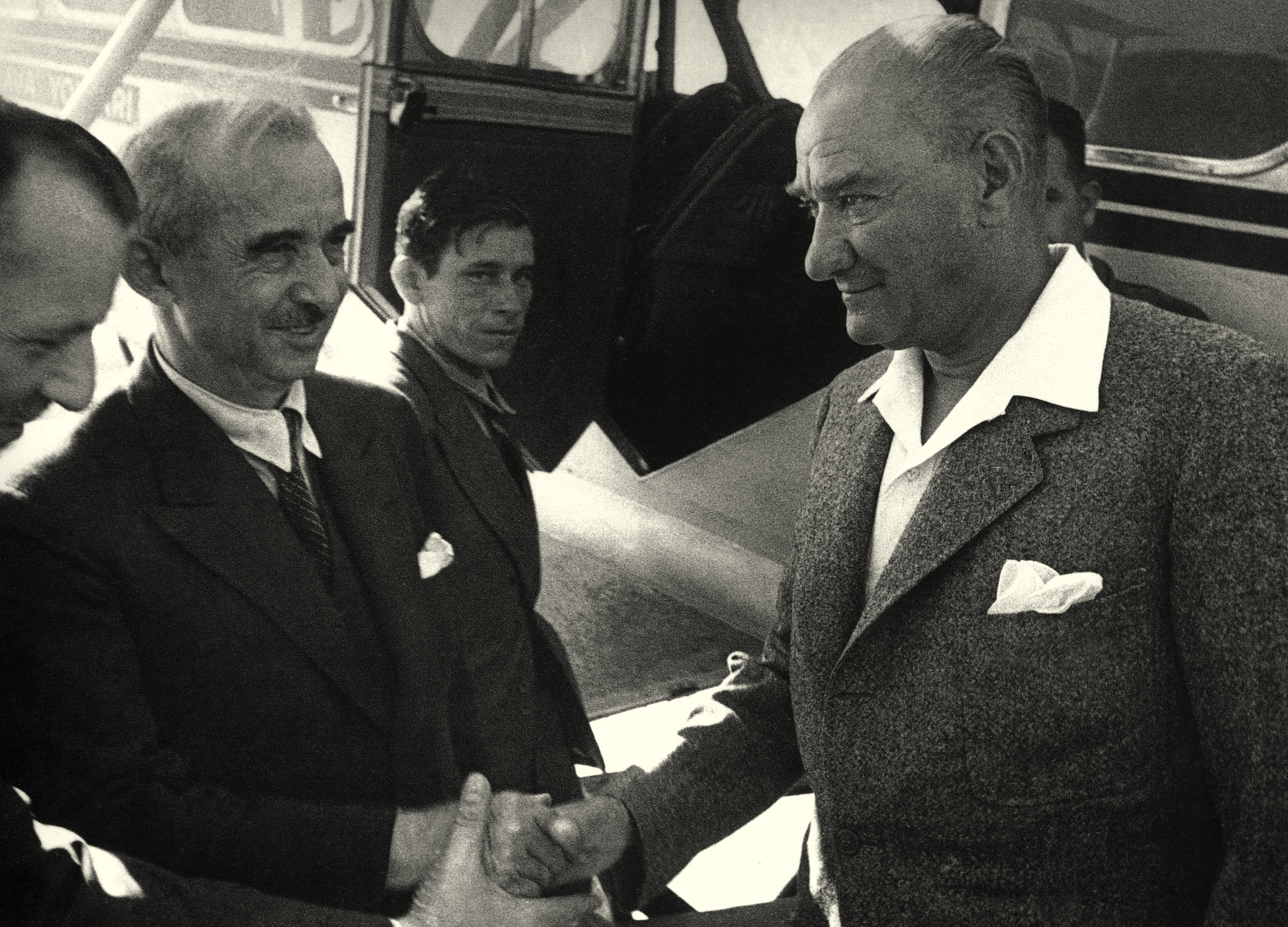
Mustafa Kemal Atatürk and his Prime Minister İsmet İnönü, 1936. İnönü would succeed him as president and CHP chairman after his death.

Mustafa Kemal Atatürk's People's Party began as a de facto successor of the Young Turks and the CUP. In 1924, a right-wing opposition to Atatürk led by Kâzım Karabekir, reacting against the abolition of the Caliphate, formed the Progressive Republican Party. The life of the opposition party was short. The Progressive Republican Party faced allegations of involvement in the Sheikh Said rebellion, overthrow the regime, and for conspiring with remaining members of the CUP to assassinate Atatürk in the İzmir Affair. Martial law was declared, all political parties except the CHP were banned, all newspapers beyond state approved papers were banned (this ban would be lifted by 1930), and Karabekir's supporters were purged from the government. Republican Turkey was the third one-party state of Interwar Europe, after the Soviet Union and Fascist Italy. For the next two decades Turkey was under a paternalist one-party authoritarian dictatorship, with one interruption; another brief experiment of opposition politics through the formation of the Liberal Republican Party.

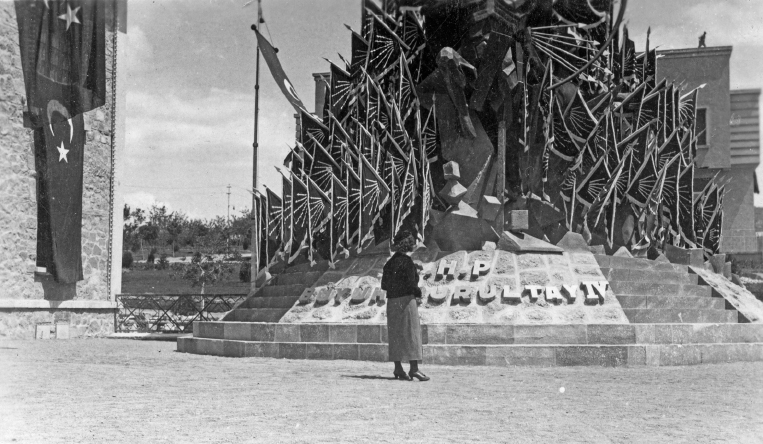
The Six Arrows statue in the garden of the Grand National Assembly during the 4th Republican People's Party Ordinary Convention, 1935

From 1924 to 1946, the CHP introduced sweeping social, cultural, educational, economic, and legal reforms that transformed Turkey into a republican nation state. Such reforms included the adoption of Swiss and Italian legal and penal codes, the acceleration of industrialization, land reform and rural development programs, nationalization of foreign assets, forced assimilation policies, strict secularism, women's suffrage, and switching written Turkish from Perso-Arabic script into Latin script, to name a few. In the party's second congress in 1927 (the first since the Sivas Congress), Atatürk delivered a thirty-six hour long speech (known as Nutuk, or "The Speech") of his account of the pivotal last eight years of Turkish history, which ended with an appeal to the Turkish youth to protect the Republic. Its narrative has served as the basis of a growing cult of personality associated with Atatürk and the historiography of the transition to the Republic from the Sultanate. In the period of 1930–1939, Atatürk's CHP clarified its ideology with 'The Six Arrows': republicanism, reformism, laïcité (secularism), populism, nationalism, and statism. They defined Atatürk's principles, which were soon known as Kemalism, and were codified into the constitution on 5 February 1937.

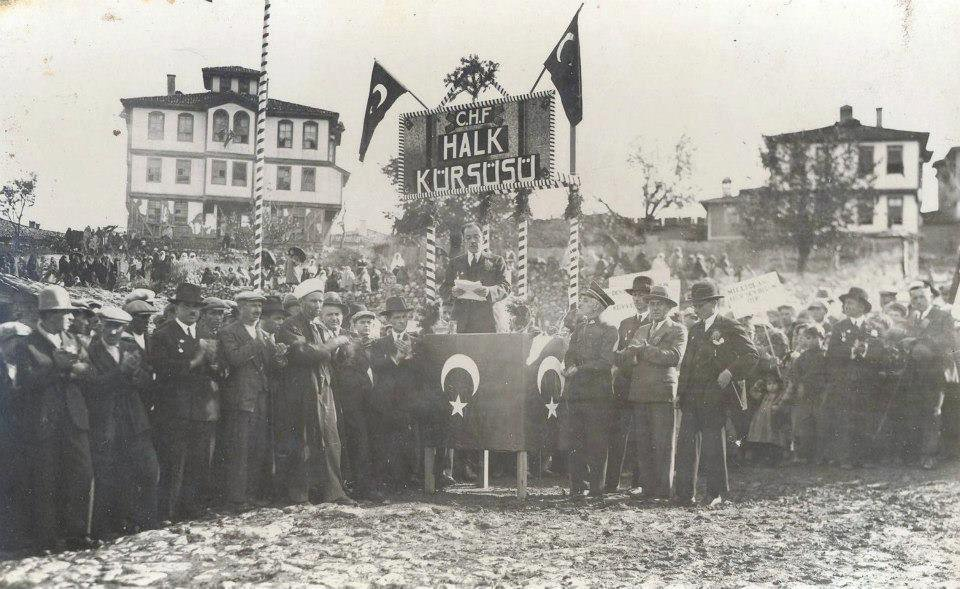
The CHP (then known with the acronym "CHF") sponsored many nation building projects throughout the 1930s, such as People's Platforms.

With the Ottomanism question settled, Turkish nation-building was prioritized which saw nationalist propaganda, language purification, and pseudo-scientific racial theories propagated. Opposition to Atatürk's reforms were suppressed by various coercive institutions and military force, at the expense of religious conservatives, minorities, and communists. The party-state cracked down on Kurdish resistance to assimilation, suppressing multiple rebellions and encouraging the denial of their existence. Anti-clerical and anti-veiling campaigns peaked in the mid-1930s. In the party's third convention, it clarified its approach towards the religious minorities of the Christians and the Jews, accepting them as real Turks as long as they adhere to the national ideal and use the Turkish language. However under the state sanctioned secularist climate Alevis were able to make great strides in their emancipation, and to this day make up a core constituency of the CHP. With the onset of the Great Depression, the party divided into statist and liberal factions, being championed by Atatürk's long-time prime minister İsmet İnönü and his finance minister Celâl Bayar respectively. Atatürk mostly favoured İnönü's policies, so economic development of the early republic was largely confined to state-owned enterprises and five-year plans. However near the end of Atatürk's presidency Bayar was appointed Prime Minister after İnönü fell from favor. Further left-wing Republicans centered around the Kadro circle were deemed to be impermissible, so they were closed down.

==== İnönü era ====
On 12 November 1938, the day after Atatürk's death, his ally İsmet İnönü was elected the second president and assumed leadership of the Republican People's Party. İnönü's presidency saw heavy state involvement in the economy and further rural development initiatives such as Village Institutes. On foreign affairs, the Hatay State was annexed and İnönü adopted a policy of neutrality despite attempts by the Allies and Axis powers to bring Turkey into World War II, during which extensive conscription and rationing was implemented to ensure an armed neutrality. Non-Muslims especially suffered when the CHP government implemented discriminatory "wealth taxes," labor battalions, and peon camps. Over the course of the war, the CHP eventually rejected ultranationalism, with pan-Turkists being purged in the Racism-Turanism Trials.

In the aftermath of World War II, İnönü presided over the democratization of Turkey. With the crisis of war over, factionalism between the liberals and statists again broke out. The Motion with Four Signatures resulted in the resignation of CHP members, most prominently Bayar, who then founded the Democrat Party (DP). İnönü called for a multi-party general election in 1946 – the first multi-party general election in the country's history, in a contest between the DP and CHP. The result was a victory for the CHP, which won 395 of the 465 seats, amid criticism that the election did not live up to democratic standards. Under pressure by the new conservative parliamentary opposition and the United States, the party became especially anti-communist, and retracted some of its rural development programs and anti-clerical policies. The period between 1946 and 1950 saw İnönü prepare for a pluralistic Turkey allied with the West. A more free and fair general election was held in 1950 that led to the CHP losing power to the DP. İnönü presided over a peaceful transition of power. The 1950 election marked the end of the CHP's last majority government. The party has not been able to regain a parliamentary majority in any subsequent election since.

=== İnönü's continued chairmanship: 1950–1972 ===
==== Opposition to the DP ====
Due to the winner-take-all system in place during the 1950s, the center-right DP achieved landslide victories in elections that were reasonably close, meaning the CHP was in opposition for 10 years. In the meantime, the CHP began a long transformation into a social democratic force. Even before losing power İnönü created the Ministry of Labour and signed workers protections into law, and universities were given autonomy from the state. In its ninth congress in 1951, the youth branch and the women's branch were founded. In 1953, the establishment of trade unions and vocational chambers was proposed, and support for a bicameral parliament, the establishment of a constitutional court, election security, judicial independence, and the right to strike for workers was added to the party program.

Though the DP and CHP were rivals, the DP was founded by conservative Republicans who mostly continued Kemalist policies. But despite its name, the Democrat Party became increasingly authoritarian by the end of its rule. İnönü was harassed and almost lynched multiple times by DP supporters across Turkey, and the DP government confiscated CHP property, shut down newspapers supporting CHP, and harassed their members. The DP blocked the CHP from forming an electoral alliance with opposition parties for the 1957 snap election. By 1960, the DP accused the CHP of plotting a rebellion and threatened its closure. With the army concerned by the DP's authoritarianism, Turkey's first military coup was performed by junior officers. After one year of junta rule the DP was banned and Prime Minister Adnan Menderes and two of his ministers were tried and executed, though president Celâl Bayar spared due to his old age and ailing health. Right-wing parties which trace their roots to the DP have since continuously attacked the CHP for their perceived involvement in the hanging of Menderes.

==== 1960s ====
The CHP emerged as the first-placed party at the general election of 1961 and formed a grand coalition with the Justice Party, a successor-party to the Democrat Party. This was the first coalition government in Turkey, which endured for seven-months. İnönü was able to form two more governments with other parties until the 1965 election. His labour minister Bülent Ecevit was instrumental in giving Turkish workers the right to strike and collective bargaining. As leader of the Democratic Left faction in the CHP, Ecevit contributed to the party adopting the Left of Centre (Ortanın solu) program for that election, which they lost against the Justice Party.

İnönü favoured Ecevit's controversial faction, resulting in Turhan Feyzioğlu leaving the CHP and founding the Reliance Party. When asked about his reasoning for his favouring Ecevit, İnönü replied: "Actually we are already a left-to-center party after embracing Laïcité. If you are populist, you are [also] at the left of center." With Feyzioğlu's departure, the CHP participated in the 1969 election with a Democratic Left program without qualms, though it achieved a similar result as its performance from last election due to the growing perception that the party primarily appealed to the educated urban elite. İnönü remained as opposition leader and the leader of the CHP until 8 May 1972, when he was overthrown by Ecevit in a party congress, due to his endorsement of the military intervention of 1971.

=== Bülent Ecevit: 1972–1980 ===
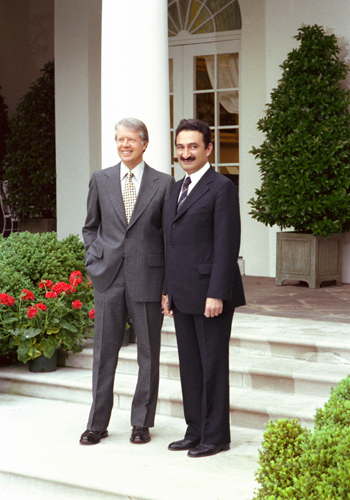
Bülent Ecevit and Jimmy Carter, 1978

As chairman, Bülent Ecevit adopted a distinct left wing role in politics and, although remaining staunchly nationalist, implemented democratic socialism into the ideology of CHP. His arrival saw support for the party increase in the 1973 election. After establishing a coalition arrangement with an Islamist party, Ecevit made the decision to invade Cyprus in an atmosphere of deteriorating order on the island that threatened the safety of Turkish Cypriots. The 1970s saw the party solidify its relations with trade unions and leftist groups in an atmosphere of intense polarization and political violence. The CHP achieved its best ever result in a free and fair multi-party election under Ecevit, when in 1977, the party received 41% of the vote, but not enough support for a majority government. Although Ecevit was able to form a government due to some MPs defecting from the Justice Party, the resulting Ecevit government was not stable either. Ecevit and his political rival Süleyman Demirel would constantly turnover the premiership as partisan deadlock took hold. This, combined with the chaos and political violence in Turkey, eventually ended in a military coup in 1980, resulting in the banning of every political party, political association, labour union, and major politicians being jailed and banned from politics.

=== Recovery period: 1980–2002 ===
Both the party name "Republican People's Party" and the abbreviation "CHP" were banned until 1987. After democracy was restored, until 1999 Turkey was ruled by the centre-right Motherland Party (ANAP) and the True Path Party (DYP), unofficial successors of the Democrat Party and the Justice Party, as well as, briefly, by the Islamist Welfare Party. CHP supporters also established successor parties. By 1985, Erdal İnönü, İsmet İnönü's son, consolidated two successor parties to form the Social Democratic Populist Party (SHP), while the Democratic Left Party (Turkish: Demokratik Sol Parti, DSP) was formed by Rahşan Ecevit, Bülent Ecevit's wife (Bülent later took over the DSP in 1987).

After the ban on pre-1980 politicians was lifted in 1987, Deniz Baykal, a household name from the pre-1980 CHP, reestablished the Republican People's Party in 1992, and the SHP merged with the party in 1995, though Ecevit's DSP rejected merger. Observers noted that the two parties held similar ideologies and split the Kemalist vote in the nineties. The CHP held an uncompromisingly secularist and establishmentalist character and supported bans of headscarves in public spaces.

From 1991 to 1996, the SHP and then the CHP were in coalition governments with the DYP. Baykal supported Mesut Yılmaz's coalition government after the collapse of the Welfare-DYP coalition following the 28 February "post-modern coup." However, due to the Türkbank scandal, the CHP withdrew its support and helped depose the government with a no confidence vote. Ecevit's DSP formed an interim-government, during which the PKK leader Abdullah Öcalan was captured in Kenya. As such, in the election of 1999, the DSP benefited massively in the polls at the expense of CHP, and the party failed to exceed the 10% threshold (8.7% vote), not winning any seats.

=== Main opposition under Baykal: 2002–2010 ===
In the 2002 general election, the CHP came back with 20% of the vote but 32% of the seats in parliament, as only it and the new AK Party (Justice and Development Party) received above the 10% threshold to enter parliament. With DSP's collapse, CHP became Turkey's main Kemalist party. It also became the second largest party and the main opposition party, a position it has retained since. Since the dramatic 2002 election, the CHP has been racked by internal power struggles, and has been outclassed by the AKP governments of Recep Tayyip Erdoğan. Many of its members were critical of the leadership of CHP, especially Baykal, who they complained was stifling the party of young blood by turning away the young who turn either to apathy or even vote for the AKP. Baykal proclaimed the party to be the secularist establishment's bulwark as he pivoted the party away from the center-left towards the center.

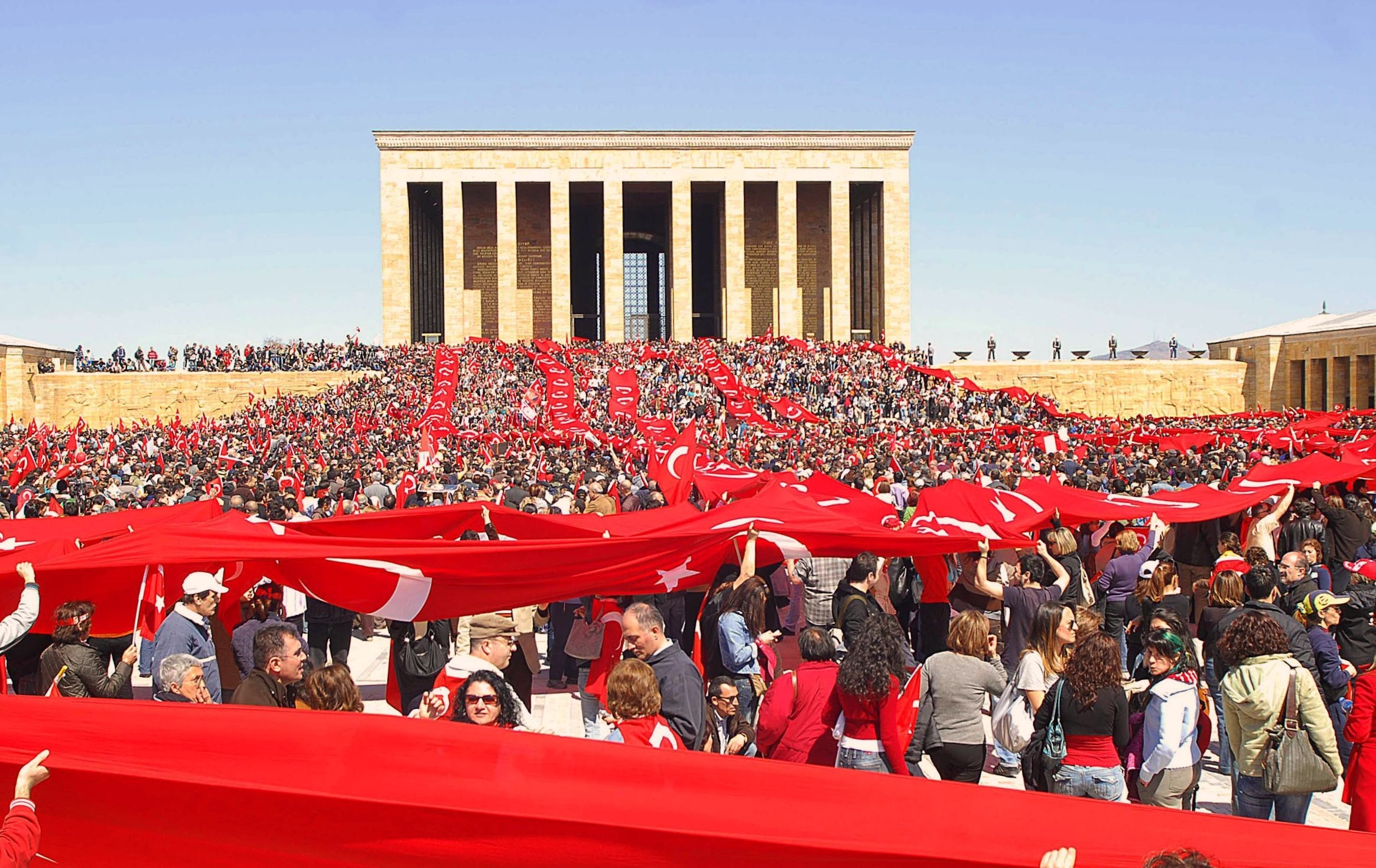
Republic Protest in Anıtkabir, Atatürk's mausoleum

In 2007, the culmination of tensions between Turkey's secularist establishment and AKP politicians turned into a political crisis. The CHP assisted undemocratic attempts by the army and judiciary to shut down the newly elected AKP. The crisis began with massive protests by secularists supported by the CHP in reaction to the AKP's candidate for that year's presidential election: Abdullah Gül, due to his background in Islamist politics and his wife's wearing of the hijab. The CHP's campaign focused on the alleged İrtica (Islamic reaction) that the AKP victory would bring into government, which served to alienate liberals and democrats from the party. The CHP chose to boycott the (indirect) election. Without quorum, Erdoğan called for a snap election to increase his mandate, in which the CHP formed an electoral alliance with the declining DSP, but gained only 21% of the vote. During the campaign season, a memorandum directed at the AKP was posted online by the Turkish Armed Forces. The CHP boycotted Gül's second attempt to be voted president, though this time Gül had the necessary quorum with MHP's participation and won. The swearing-in ceremony was boycotted by the CHP and the Chief of the General Staff Yaşar Büyükanıt.

The party also voted against a package of constitutional amendments to have the president elected by the people instead of parliament, which was eventually put to a referendum. The "no" campaign, supported by the CHP, failed, as a majority of Turks voted in favor of direct presidential elections. The final challenge against the AKP's existence was a 2008 closure trial which ended without a ban. Following the decision, the AKP government, in a covert alliance with the Gülen movement, began a purge of the Turkish military, judiciary, and police forces of secularists in the Ergenekon and Sledgehammer trials, which the CHP condemned.

Between 2002 and 2010, Turkey held three general elections and two local elections, all of which the CHP received between 18 and 23% of the vote.

In the lead up to the US-lead coalition invasion of Iraq, AKP leadership failed to come to a consensus whether to participate. By a thin margin, parliament vetoed invading Iraq, due to half of the AKP's parliamentary group voting with the CHP against war. CHP leadership briefly held a soft Euroscepticism as the AKP government came close to an ascension plan with the European Union.

=== Main opposition under Kılıçdaroğlu: 2010–2023 ===
On 10 May 2010, Deniz Baykal announced his resignation as leader of the Republican People's Party after a sex tape of him was leaked to the media. Kemal Kılıçdaroğlu was elected to be the new party leader. Kılıçdaroğlu returned the CHP to its traditional social-democratic image and cast away its secularist-establishmentalist character. This involved building bridges to voters it has traditionally not attracted: the devout, Kurds, and right-wing voters. However even with Kılıçdaroğlu at the helm, after five general elections, the CHP still did not win an election, receiving between only 22 and 26% of the vote in parliamentary elections. The CHP supported the unsuccessful "no" campaign in the 2010 constitutional referendum. In his first general election in 2011, the party increased its support by 25% but not enough to unseat the AKP. The 2013 Gezi Park protests found much support in the CHP.

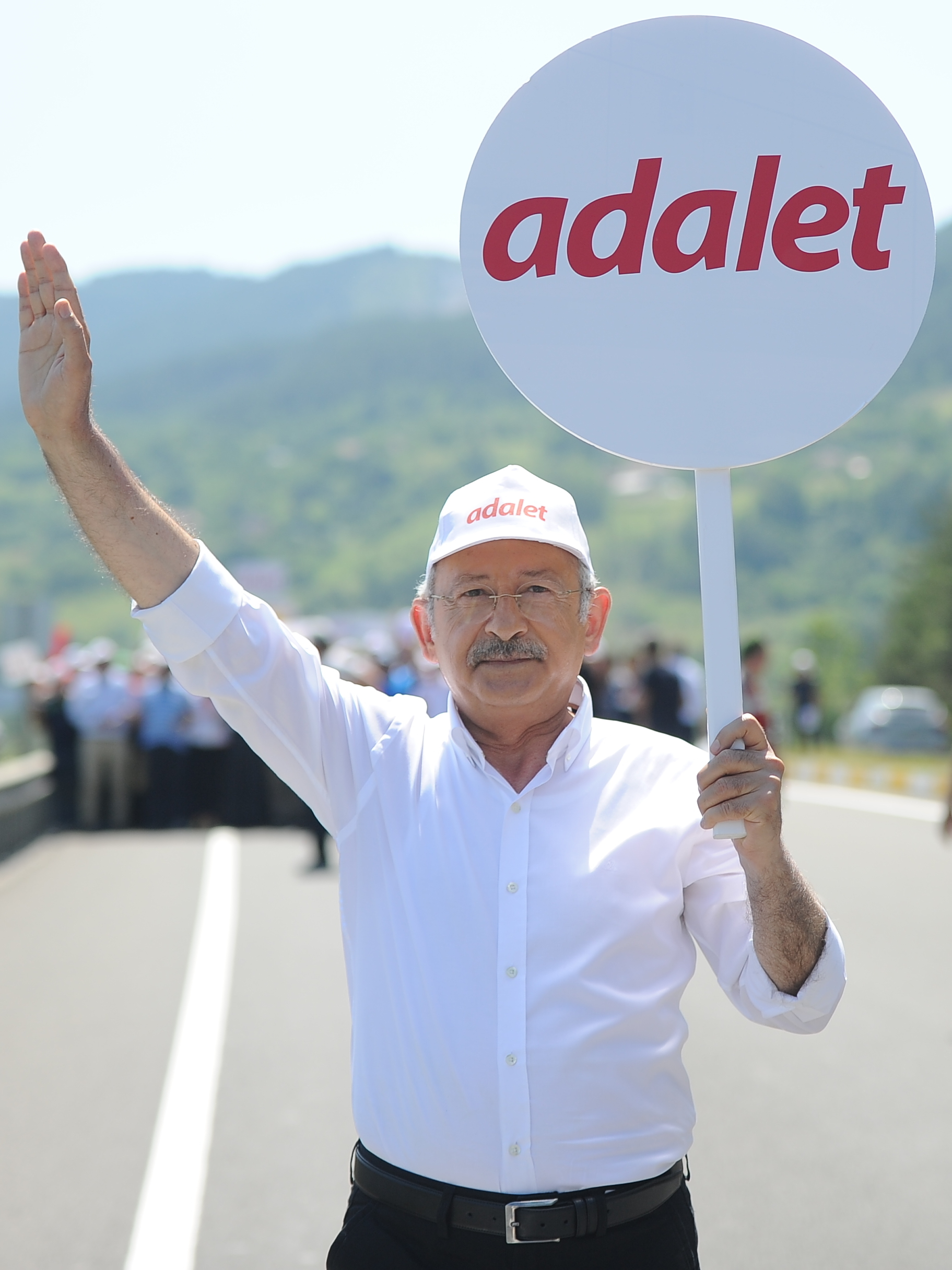
Kemal Kılıçdaroğlu during the 2017 March for Justice

The 2014 presidential election was the first in which the position would be directly elected and came just after a massive corruption scandal. The CHP and MHP's joint candidate Ekmeleddin İhsanoğlu still lost to Erdoğan with only 38% of the vote. The two parties were critical of the government's negotiations for peace with the PKK, which lasted from 2013–July 2015. In the June 2015 general election, the AKP lost its parliamentary majority due to the debut of the pro-Kurdish People's Democratic Party (HDP), which was possible because of strategic voting by CHP voters so the party could pass the 10% threshold. Coalition talks went nowhere. MHP ruled out partaking in a government with HDP in a CHP lead government and the CHP refused to govern with the AKP after weeks of negotiations. In a snap election held that November, the AKP regained their parliamentary majority as well as MHP's support.

Kılıçdaroğlu supported the government in the 2016 coup d'état attempt, the subsequent purges, and incursions into Syria. This support went so far as to help the government pass a law to lift parliamentary immunities, resulting in the jailing of MPs from the HDP, including Selahattin Demirtaş, as well as CHP lawmakers. The party lead the unsuccessful "no" campaign for the 2017 constitutional referendum.

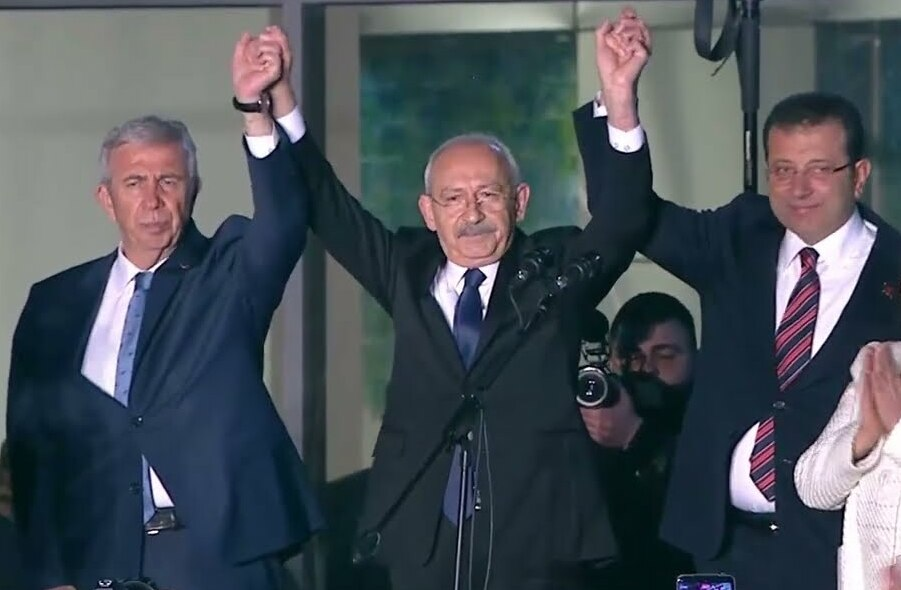
Mayor of Ankara Mansur Yavaş, Leader of CHP Kemal Kılıçdaroğlu and Mayor of Istanbul Ekrem İmamoğlu

By 2017, dissidents from MHP founded the Good Party. Kılıçdaroğlu was instrumental in the facilitating the rise of the new party by transferring MPs so they would have a parliamentary group to compete in the 2018 election. In the 2018 general election the CHP, Good Party, Felicity, and Democrat Party established the Nation Alliance to challenge the AKP and MHP's People's Alliance. Though CHP's vote was reduced to 22%, strategic voting for the other parties yielded the alliance 33% of the vote. Their candidate for president: Muharrem İnce, lost in the first round, receiving only 30% of the vote. The Nation Alliance was re-established for the 2019 local elections, which saw great gains for the CHP, capturing nearly 30% of the electorate. A tacit collaboration with the HDP allowed for CHP to win the municipal mayoralties of İstanbul and Ankara.

Kemal Kılıçdaroğlu was nominated as the CHP and the Nation Alliance candidate for the 2023 presidential election. Ekrem İmamoğlu and Mansur Yavaş, mayors of İstanbul and Ankara respectively, along with other party leaders in Nation Alliance, ran to be his vice-presidents. Despite the government's lackluster response to the economic crisis, COVID-19 pandemic, and the Kahramanmaraş earthquake, Kılıçdaroğlu lost his bid to Erdoğan after taking the race to a run-off and receiving 48% of the vote. The Nation Alliance again lost the parliamentary election to the ruling People's Alliance. Smaller parties to the CHP's right ran on its lists, which resulted in them receiving 35 seats in parliament for minimal electoral gains. At the 38th ordinary party congress held shortly after the election, Özgür Özel was elected leader of the CHP, defeating the incumbent Kılıçdaroğlu who had held the position since 2010.

=== Main opposition under Özel: 2023–26 ===
The party won a major victory in the 2024 local elections. CHP mayors were reelected in Istanbul and Ankara, along with new victories in rural Aegean and Central Anatolian provinces. Since 1977, this was the first time the CHP won the popular vote winning 37.8% of the electorate, and was the AKP's first nation-wide defeat.

Ekrem İmamoğlu, the CHP mayor of Istanbul, was detained and later arrested by police in March 2025, along with over 100 other individuals. Major protests occurred immediately following the arrests across the country, with CHP officials backing the protesters. The party's primary election to choose its nominee for president in 2028 took place on 23 March, the day of İmamoğlu's arrest, which he won in a landslide.

=== Absolute nullity crisis ===
On 21 May 2026, the Ankara Regional Court invalidated the 38th Ordinary and 21st Extraordinary Party Conventions, which resulted in the dismissal of Özel and the reinstatement of the former leader Kılıçdaroğlu. One day before the decision, Kılıçdaroğlu called for "purging" without referencing the ongoing court case. After the decision was announced, the BIST 100 index fell by 6% before recovering the next day. Two days later, Özel was re-elected as parliamentary group leader by 95 out of 96 votes. In his group speech, Özel announced that he does not accept the court decision and called for a renewed convention. The next day, Kılıçdaroğlu requested law enforcement to help him take over the CHP headquarters from intra-party opposition.

Özel and his supporters argued that the decision of the court was a judicial coup, as this marked the first time in Turkish history that "a party leadership elected by delegates was overturned by a court ruling." The mayor of Ankara, Mansur Yavaş, argued the aim of the coup was to 'divide Turkey's biggest opposition party and render it ineffective.' Analysts have argued that this decision could cripple the CHP against the AK Party and trigger a snap election as early as autumn. Human Rights Watch (HRW) described the ruling as "the latest deeply damaging blow to the rule of law, democracy, and human rights" in Turkey. In July 2026, Özel and 90 other MPs announced the formation of the New Party, formally splitting from the CHP.

== Ideology and political positions ==
The Republican People's Party is a centre-left political party that espouses social democracy and Kemalism. The CHP describes itself as a "modern social democratic party, which is faithful to the founding principles and values of the Republic of Turkey". Within the party there are also nationalist, social liberal, and democratic socialist (and anti-Stalinist) factions.

The distance between the party administration and many leftist grassroots, especially left-oriented Kurdish voters, contributed to the party's shift away from the political left.

Numerous politicians from the party have espoused support for LGBT rights, and the feminist movement in Turkey, stating it will combat discrimination in employment and hate speech in media against sexual identities and sexual orientations through legislative action.

Kemal Kılıçdaroğlu and then Özgür Özel have repeatedly called for Selahattin Demirtaş and Osman Kavala to be released from jail.

The party doesn't recognize the Armenian Genocide.

=== Foreign policy ===
The party holds a significant position in the Socialist International, Progressive Alliance and is an associate member of the Party of European Socialists. In 2014, the CHP urged the Socialist International to accept the Republican Turkish Party of Northern Cyprus as a full member.

During the Gaza war, Chairman Özgür Özel accused Israel of committing state sanctioned terrorism on the Palestinian people, declaring "The Turkish left is never far from the Palestinian cause." Özel considers Hamas and its October 7 attacks against Israeli civilians "an act of terrorism."

While the CHP has voted against Turkish intervention in Iraq since 2021, and since 2023, it has also voted against intervention in Syria. In a close parliamentary vote, the CHP goaded enough AKP defectors to veto Turkey joining America's 2003 invasion of Iraq in the 1 March Memorandum.

The party is pro-European and supports Turkish membership to the European Union. They also support Turkish membership to NATO and the expansion of the alliance. The party MPs voted overwhelmingly in favor of both Finland's and Sweden's accession into NATO.

== Factions ==
=== Reformists ===
Reformists (Turkish: Değişimciler) is a colloquial term for the social democratic and progressive opposition to Kemal Kılıçdaroğlu that emerged following the 2023 Turkish presidential election. The morning after the election, Ekrem İmamoğlu posted a video on his official Twitter account, calling for "change" in the CHP and Turkey. On 19 July 2023, a 14-minute part of the Zoom conference between İmamoğlu and other prominent CHP officials, discussing the future strategies of the party, was leaked on YouTube. The meeting was held without the knowledge of the then-CHP leader, Kılıçdaroğlu, and it sparked outrage of some factions in the party.

In the meanwhile, reformists announced a website called "İktidar İçin Değişim", expressing the future plans for both the CHP and Turkey. The manifesto focused on change in the opposition and emphasized democratization, inclusivity, and mass participation in the decision-making process.

The 38th Republican People's Party Ordinary Convention was originally set for summer 2022, but the Party Assembly postponed it to November 2023, in accordance with the national COVID-19 measures. The convention was held on 4–5 November 2023, which was won by Özgür Özel, by first a slight margin, but then a landslide victory in the runoff. Following the change in the office, CHP introduced many changes in its bylaw, including a term limit for MPs, a 50% women and 30% youth quota in internal bodies, wider representation for disabled people, and primaries.

Under the reformist leadership, CHP achieved an unexpected victory by defeating Erdoğan's AK Party in the 2024 Turkish local elections, for the first time in two decades. In addition to mayors, the party also guaranteed majority in the municipal councils of many key cities, such as Istanbul and Ankara. It alleviated the ruling AK Party's obstructions to municipalities already held by CHP. Days after the elections, with the refreshed delegates, Ekrem İmamoğlu was elected the President of the Turkish Municipalities Union by a landslide margin, handing over a central government body to CHP for the first time since 1977.

After Özgür Özel was deposed as party leader by the judiciary and replaced by Kılıçdaroğlu, Özel decided to create the New Party, with 91 members of CHP in the Grand National Assembly (including Özel) defecting to it. The creation of the New Party was supported by İmamoğlu.

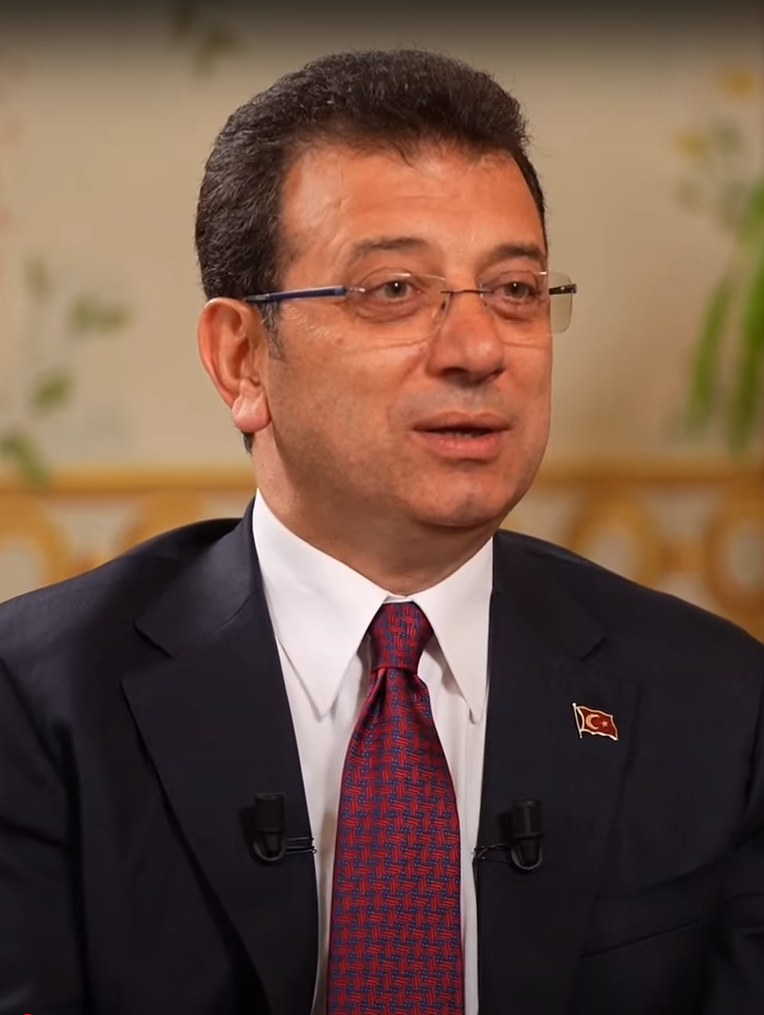
Mayor of Istanbul
Ekrem İmamoğlu

=== Ulusalists ===
Ulusalists (lit. nationalists) are a vague group within the CHP that encompasses of hardliner Kemalists and populists who draw attention to the safeguarding of the secular republic and the Turkish Revolution. Ulusalists disagreed with the then-CHP leadership in regards to reaching out to Kurds, and consolidated grounds to run against Kılıçdaroğlu. They were eventually defeated at the 18th Republican People's Party Extraordinary Convention, causing most prominent figures to leave the CHP. Muharrem İnce, who ran for president in 2018, founded the Homeland Party, a populist and self-identified Kemalist political party that was proposed as an alternative to the CHP.

Though the Ulusalists no longer pose a united front, there are still some politicians that confront the CHP leadership. Tanju Özcan, the Mayor of Bolu, is an example. He is known for excessive xenophobist policies against Syrian migrants, such as raising water bills and marriage fees merely for the residents of foreign origin. A criminal investigation was eventually carried out by the Public Prosecutor's Office, in which he admitted that his actions were against law. Özcan was dismissed from the CHP in 2022, but the new reformist leadership pardoned him.

=== Y-CHP ===
The New Republican People's Party (Turkish: Yeni Cumhuriyet Halk Partisi), abbreviated Y-CHP, is a term that was first derived from New Labour and is nowadays used in a pejorative sense to denote the fundamental reforms under Kılıçdaroğlu's leadership to liberalize the CHP into becoming a centrist political party that addresses broader communities.

== Electorate ==
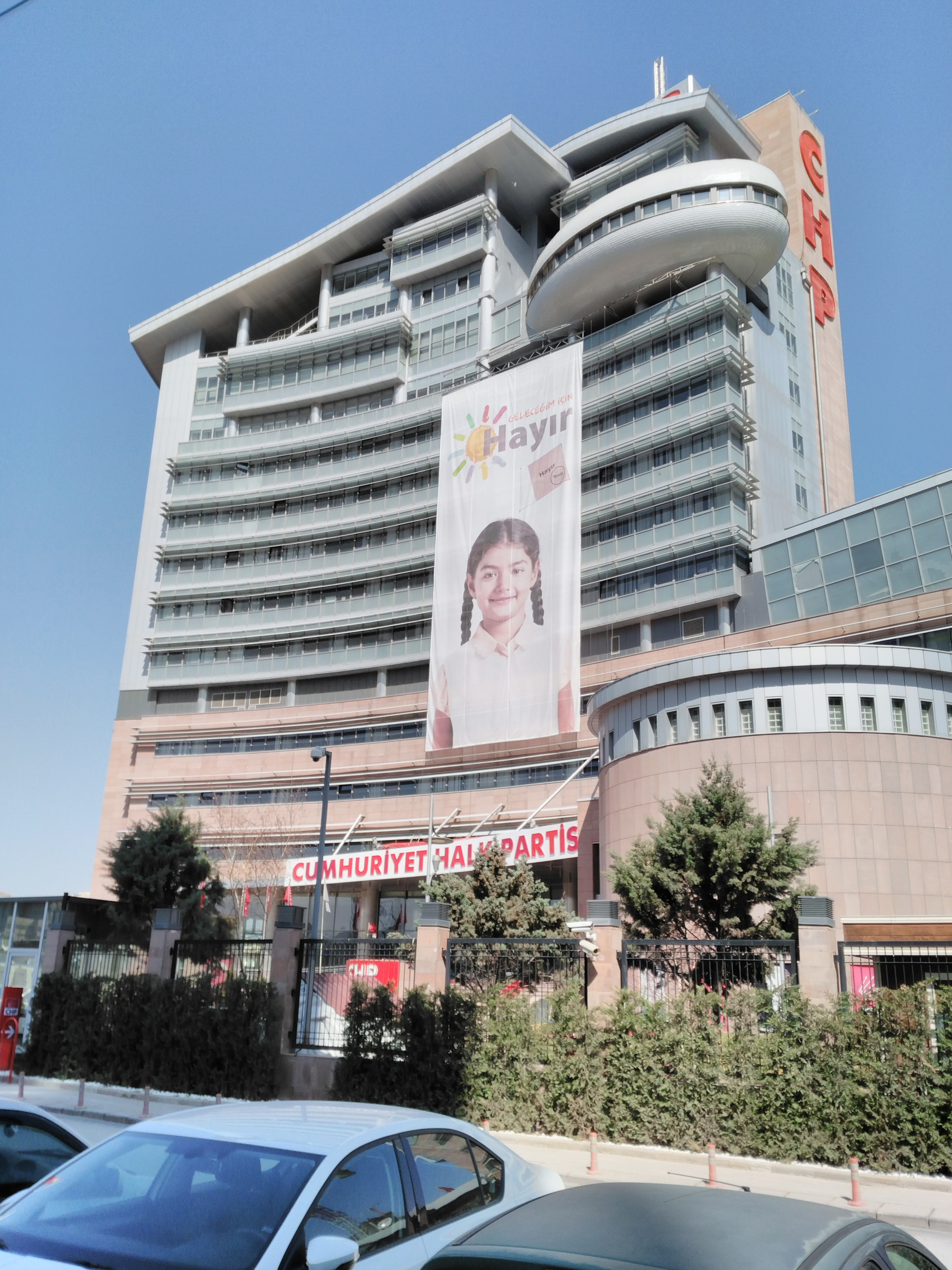
Party headquarters in Ankara showing a banner urging a "no" vote in the 2017 referendum on establishing a presidential system

The CHP draws its support from professional middle-class secular and liberally religious voters. It has traditional ties to the middle and upper-middle classes such as white-collar workers, retired generals, and government bureaucrats as well as academics, college students, left-leaning intellectuals and labour unions such as DİSK. The party also appeals to minority groups such as Alevis. According to The Economist, "to the dismay of its own leadership the CHP's core constituency, as well as most of its MPs, are Alevis." The party's current leader, Kemal Kılıçdaroğlu, is also an Alevi. The disproportionate representation of Alevis in the party administration was criticized by opponents.

The CHP also draws much of their support from voters of big cities and coastal regions. The party's strongholds are the west of the Aegean Region (İzmir, Aydın, Muğla), the northwest of the Marmara Region (Turkish Thrace; Edirne, Kırklareli, Tekirdağ, Çanakkale), the east of the Black Sea Region (Ardahan and Artvin), and the Anatolian college town of Eskişehir.

== Party leaders ==
No.	Name (Born–Died)	Portrait	Term in Office	
1	Mustafa Kemal Atatürk (1881–1938)	Mustafa Kemal Atatürk	9 September 1923	10 November 1938
2	İsmet İnönü (1884–1973)	İsmet İnönü	26 December 1938	8 May 1972
3	Bülent Ecevit (1925–2006)	Bülent Ecevit	14 May 1972	30 October 1980
Party closed down following the 12 September 1980 coup d'état
4	Deniz Baykal (1938–2023)	Deniz Baykal	9 September 1992	18 February 1995
5	Hikmet Çetin (1937–)	Hikmet Çetin	18 February 1995	9 September 1995
(4)	Deniz Baykal (1938–2023)	Deniz Baykal	9 September 1995	23 May 1999
6	Altan Öymen (1932–2025)	Altan Öymen	23 May 1999	30 September 2000
(4)	Deniz Baykal (1938–2023)	Deniz Baykal	30 September 2000	10 May 2010
7	Kemal Kılıçdaroğlu (1948–)	Kemal Kılıçdaroğlu	22 May 2010	5 November 2023
8	Özgür Özel (1974–)	Özgür Özel	5 November 2023	21 May 2026
(7)	Kemal Kılıçdaroğlu (1948–)	Kemal Kılıçdaroğlu	21 May 2026	Acting

== Election results ==
=== Grand National Assembly of Turkey ===
Grand National Assembly of Turkey
Election	Leader	Popular vote				Number of seats			Status
Election	Leader	Votes	%	± pp	Rank	Seats	+/–	Rank	Status
1927	Mustafa Kemal Atatürk	—	—	—	1st	335 / 335	0	1st	Majority government
1931	Mustafa Kemal Atatürk	—	—	—	1st	287 / 317	▼48	1st	Majority government
1935	Mustafa Kemal Atatürk	—	—	—	1st	401 / 428	▲114	1st	Majority government
1939	İsmet İnönü	—	—	—	1st	466 / 470	▲65	1st	Majority government
1943	İsmet İnönü	—	—	—	1st	488 / 492	▲22	1st	Majority government
1946	İsmet İnönü	—	—	—	1st	397 / 503	▼73	1st	Majority government
1950	İsmet İnönü	3,176,561	39.45	▲39.45	▲2nd	69 / 492	▲69	▲2nd	Main Opposition
1954	İsmet İnönü	3,161,696	35.36	▼4.09	2nd	31 / 537	▼38	2nd	Main Opposition
1957	İsmet İnönü	3,753,136	41.09	▲4.73	2nd	178 / 602	▲147	2nd	Main Opposition
1961	İsmet İnönü	3,724,752	36.74	▼4.35	▲1st	173 / 450	▼5	▲1st	Coalition government
1965	İsmet İnönü	2,675,785	28.75	▼7.99	▼2nd	134 / 450	▼39	▼2nd	Main Opposition
1969	İsmet İnönü	2,487,163	27.37	▼1.38	2nd	143 / 450	▲9	2nd	Main Opposition
1973	Bülent Ecevit	3,570,583	33.30	▲5.93	▲1st	185 / 450	▲42	▲1st	Coalition government
1977	Bülent Ecevit	6,136,171	41.38	▲8.09	1st	213 / 450	▲28	1st	Coalition government
Party closed following the 1980 Turkish coup d'état.
1995	Deniz Baykal	3,011,076	10.71	▲10.71	▲5th	49 / 550	▲49	▲5th	Opposition
1999	Deniz Baykal	2,716,094	8.71	▼2.00	▼6th	0 / 550	▼8	▼6th	Extra-parliamentary opposition
2002	Deniz Baykal	6,113,352	19.39	▲10.68	▲2nd	178 / 550	▲178	▲2nd	Main Opposition
2007	Deniz Baykal	7,317,808	20.88	▲1.50	2nd	112 / 550	▼66	2nd	Main Opposition
2011	Kemal Kılıçdaroğlu	11,155,972	25.98	▲5.10	2nd	135 / 550	▲23	2nd	Main Opposition
2015	Kemal Kılıçdaroğlu	11,518,139	24.95	▼1.03	2nd	132 / 550	▼3	2nd	Main Opposition
2015	Kemal Kılıçdaroğlu	12,111,812	25.32	▲0.37	2nd	134 / 550	▲2	2nd	Main Opposition
2018	Kemal Kılıçdaroğlu	11,348,899	22.64	▼2.68	2nd	146 / 600	▲12	2nd	Main Opposition
2023	Kemal Kılıçdaroğlu	13,655,909	25.33	▲2.69	2nd	169 / 600	▲23	2nd	Main Opposition

=== Presidential elections ===
Presidential election record of the Republican People's Party (CHP)
Election	Candidate	Votes	%	Outcome	Map
10 August 2014	Ekmeleddin İhsanoğlu; Cross-party with MHP	15,587,720	38.44%	2nd	
24 June 2018	Muharrem İnce	15,340,321	30.64%	2nd	
14 May 2023	Kemal Kılıçdaroğlu	24,595,178 (first round); 25,504,724 (second round)	44.88% (first round); 47.82% (second round)	2nd	

=== Senate elections ===
Election date	Party leader	Number of votes received	Percentage of votes	Number of senators
1961	İsmet İnönü	3,734,285	36,1%	36 / 150
1964	İsmet İnönü	1,125,783	40,8%	19 / 51
1966	İsmet İnönü	877,066	29,6%	13 / 52
1968	İsmet İnönü	899,444	27,1%	13 / 53
1973	Bülent Ecevit	1,412,051	33,6%	25 / 52
1975	Bülent Ecevit	2,281,470	43,4%	25 / 54
1977	Bülent Ecevit	2,037,875	42,4%	28 / 50
1979	Bülent Ecevit	1,378,224	29,1%	12 / 50

=== Local elections ===
Election date	Party leader	Provincial Council		Mayorship			Map
Election date	Party leader	Votes	%	Votes	%	#	
1930	Mustafa Kemal Atatürk					478 / 502	
1934	Mustafa Kemal Atatürk						
1938	Mustafa Kemal Atatürk						
1942	İsmet İnönü						
1946	İsmet İnönü						
1950	İsmet İnönü	570,606	37.5				
1963	İsmet İnönü	3,458,972	36.22	1,062,432	35.7	335 / 1,045	
1968	İsmet İnönü	2,542,644	27.90	994,938	30.7	289 / 1,252	
1973	Bülent Ecevit	3,708,687	37.09	1,716,302	39.6	551 / 1,640	
1977	Bülent Ecevit	5,161,426	41.73	2,682,282	45.7	714 / 1,730	
1984	Party closed following the 1980 Turkish coup d'état until 1993.						
1989	Party closed following the 1980 Turkish coup d'état until 1993.						
1994	Deniz Baykal	1,297,371	4.61	869,921	4.4	64 / 2,710	
1999	Deniz Baykal	3,487,483	11.08	3,227,096	13.8	373 / 3,215	
2004	Deniz Baykal	5,848,180	18.38	4,988,427	20.7	467 / 3,193	
2009	Deniz Baykal	9,233,662	23.11	7,960,562	24.7	503 / 2,903	
2014	Kemal Kılıçdaroğlu	10,938,262	26.34	11,008,961	26.45	226 / 1,351	
2019	Kemal Kılıçdaroğlu	12,625,346	29.36	12,868,053	29.81	240 / 1,355	
2024	Özgür Özel	17,345,876	37.77	17,391,548	37.77	406 / 1,363	

== See also ==
- Atatürkist Thought Association
- Halk TV
- Left of Center (Turkey)
- List of political parties in Turkey
- List of main opposition leaders of Turkey
- New Party
- Şero
- Ulus
- Ulusalism
- New Republican People's Party
