= Association for Defence of National Rights =

Organization

Anatolia and Rumelia Committee for the Defence of Rights Anadolu ve Rumeli Müdâfaa-i Hukuk Cemiyeti
- Leader: Mustafa Kemal Pasha
- Founded: 7 September 1919
- Dissolved: 9 September 1923
- Preceded by: Committee of Union and Progress (denied)
- Succeeded by: Republican People's Party
- Headquarters: Sivas; Ankara
- Ideology: Turkish nationalism Neo-Ittihadism (some factions, denied)

Associations for Defence of National Rights (Turkish: Müdâfaa-i Hukuk Cemiyetleri) were regional resistance organisations established in the Ottoman Empire between 1918 and 1919 that pledged themselves to the Defence of National Rights movement. They would eventually unite into the Association for the Defence of Rights of Anatolia and Rumelia in the Sivas Congress.

== Background ==
Following the defeat of the Ottoman Empire in the First World War, the Ottoman army was disarmed according to the Armistice of Mudros. Although the Ottoman Empire had to agree to give up vast areas including most of Middle East, the Allies further retained the power of controlling what was left of the Ottoman Empire, namely Anatolia. It soon became clear that the Allies were planning to allocate parts of Turkey to Armenia and Greece. Parenthetically, southern Anatolia was to be put under French and Italian spheres of influence.

== The national associations ==
The first association was founded in Izmir by Muslims to protest the possible annexation of the city into Greece, on 1 December 1918. Its establishment was facilitated by local Committee of Union and Progress members and bureaucrats and army commanders of the area. Eventually, the Greek army was deployed to occupy Izmir anyway on 15 May 1919.

The occupations, especially that of the Occupation of Izmir, caused deep reactions among the Ottoman people. Several patriotic associations were formed simultaneously in different parts of Turkey as a result. The former Unionists as well as nationalistic soldiers and intellectuals, were active in these associations and were struggling to have their voices heard by peaceful methods like protesting, meetings, and publishing notices, which were not effective at changing the Allies' policy.

== After the Congress of Sivas ==
During the Congress of Sivas held in September 1919, these associations were united under the name of "Association for the Defence of National Rights of Anatolia and Rumelia" (Turkish: Anadolu ve Rumeli Müdâfaa-i Hukuk Cemiyeti). This unified organisation became the main political force in Turkey up to the end of the Turkish War of Independence. Its chairman was Mustafa Kemal (later surnamed Atatürk), who would go on to become modern Turkey's founding father. After the war of independence and the Treaty of Lausanne, Atatürk proposed to change the name of the organisation to the People's Party on 9 September 1923, just one year after the liberation of Izmir. After the Republic was proclaimed, the unified organisation was renamed to the Republican People's Party (CHP), which would rule Turkey until 1950, and remains one of Turkey's main political parties to this day.

== List of associations ==
The following are associations that took part in the grouping (with their location or main group component listed in parentheses).

- Şarkî Anadolu Müdafaa-i Hukuk Cemiyeti (East Anatolia)
- İzmir Müdafaa-i Hukuku Osmaniye Cemiyeti (Izmir)
- İstihlası Vatan Cemiyeti (Manisa)
- Trakya-Paşaeli Müdafaa-i Hukuk Cemiyeti (East Thrace)
- Trabzon Muhafaza-i Hukuku Milliye Cemiyeti (Trabzon)
- Kilikyalılar Cemiyeti (Adana-Mersin)
- Hareket-i Milliye ve Redd-i İlhak Teşkilatları (Izmir)
- Adana Vilayeti Müdafaa-i Hukuk Cemiyeti (Adana)
- Kozan Müdafaa-i Hukuk Cemiyeti (Kozan)
- Anadolu Kadınları Müdafaa-i Vatan Cemiyeti (Women's organisation)
