= Timeline of the Turkish War of Independence =

External Timeline	A graphical timeline is available at Turkish War of Independence

This chronology of the Turkish War of Indrependence (also known as Turkish war of liberation) is a timeline of events during the Turkish War of Independence (1919–1923). The timeline also includes the background events starting with the end of the First World War. The events are classified according to the campaigns and parties involved. Pictures are included for the significant events.

== Legend ==
Legend
Groups	Parties	Main Article
	Turkish National Movement	Turkish War of Independence
	Mustafa Kemal Pasha
	Ottoman Empire/Istanbul government
Joint actions by Allies of World War I	Britain	United Kingdom during the Turkish War of Independence
Joint actions by Allies of World War I	France	Franco-Turkish War
Joint actions by Allies of World War I	Greece	Greco-Turkish War
Joint actions by Allies of World War I	Armenia	Turkish–Armenian War
Joint actions by Allies of World War I	Italy
Joint actions by Allies of World War I	United States	United States during the Turkish War of Independence
	Russia
	Georgia	Turkish–Georgian War
	Separatist movements/revolts	Revolts during the Turkish War of Independence
	Socialists
	Armistices, peace conferences, and treaties
	International events/Other	Aftermath of World War I

== 1918 ==
Date	Event
30 Oct 1918	Signing of the Armistice of Mudros between Turkey, represented by Hüseyin Rauf Bey and Britain, represented by Somerset Gough-Calthorpe. Turkey withdraws from the Great War. Among the many stipulations, the Ottoman Empire must: I) Open the Straits to Allied shipping, guarantee access to the Black Sea, and provide for Allied occupation of the fortresses along the Dardanelles and Bosphorus; V) Foresee immediate demobilisation the army, except where necessary to preserve order VII) Give the Allies "the right to occupy any strategic points in the event of any situation arising which threatens the security of the Allies"; XI) Immediately withdraw all troops from Northwest Persia and the Caucasus; XV) Provide for Allied control over railroads XVI) Surrender all garrisons in Hejaz, Asir, Yemen, Syria and Mesopotamia. Withdraw all troops from Cilicia except those which maintain order. The Ottoman general staff was not required to be dissolved and the role of the Ottoman dynasty was not touched. The agreement was made without consultation between Britain and its allies.
30 Oct 1918	Lord Balfour announces that the Agreement of Saint-Jean-de-Maurienne is void, to much protest by the Italians, which will soon support the Ottoman Empire in resistance to Allied settlements
31 Oct 1918	Mustafa Kemal Pasha takes over command of the Yildirim Army Group (on the Syrian front) from Otto Liman von Sanders.
1 Nov 1918	Last congress of the Committee of Union and Progress gathers in Istanbul, the party dissolves itself. It is reorganized into the Renewal Party, the Ottoman Liberal People's Party splits off. The Karakol society is founded in this period on the orders of Talat Pasha to safe guard Turkish interests in the defeated Ottoman Empire
2 Nov 1918	Enver Pasha, Talat Pasha, Cemal Pasha and others leading names of the CUP leave Constantinople/Istanbul
5 Nov 1918	1918 United States midterm elections see the Republican Party win a majority in the United States Senate. President Woodrow Wilson has to contend with isolationist control over the upper house despite his internationalist tendencies
7 Nov 1918	British troops occupy Mosul, in violation of the armistice.
8 Nov 1918	Grand vizier Ahmed Izzet Pasha and his government resigns
9 Nov 1918	British troops occupy Alexandretta/İskenderun after Mustafa Kemal Pasha reluctantly permits them to do so. British forces occupy both sides of the Dardanelles
9 Nov 1918	Conclusion of the German revolution: Germany declares itself a republic
11 Nov 1918	A new Ottoman government is formed under the Grand Vizier Ahmed Tevfik Pasha
12 Nov 1918	A French brigade enters Istanbul to begin the Allied occupation of the city and its immediate dependencies (the two opposite peninsulas). A fleet consisting of British, French, Italian and Greek ships deploy additional troops the next day.
13 Nov 1918	Mustafa Kemal Pasha arrives at Haydarpasha Station from Adana after the dissolution of Yildirim Army Group on 7 November. Along with Hüseyin Rauf, Ali Fethi, and Ismail Canbulat, they attempt to convince parliament not to confirm Tevfik Pasha as Grand Vizier
14 Nov 1918	Joint French-Greek troops cross the Maritsa/Meriç River and occupy the town of Uzunköprü in Eastern Thrace as well as the railway axis until the train station of Hadımköy near Çatalca on the outskirts of Istanbul.
14 Nov 1918	First Kars Congress organized by representatives of the Turkish-Muslim majority population in Kars region to figure out what to do with the retreat of Ottoman forces.
15 Nov 1918	Ottoman troops withdraw from Baku, which will be occupied by British troops in the following days, and also evacuate Mosul, to be occupied by the British after the armistice.
18 Nov 1918	Ottoman troops withdraw from Tabriz.
19 Nov 1918	Ottoman Parliament holds a vote to confirm Tevfik Pasha as Grand Vizier. Fearing a new election, most MPs of the Renewal Party -which holds a majority, though distrusts Tevfik- votes their confidence in his cabinet. Mehmed VI trusts Tevfik to guard the interests of the royal family over the state.
23 Nov 1918	Establishment of the "Mazhar Commission" by the Ottoman government, to investigate war crimes against Ottoman Christians during World War I
28 Nov 1918	Kâzım Karabekir Pasha arrives at Istanbul from Kars.
30 Nov 1918	Second Kars Congress. Muslim population expresses opposition to incorporation into Georgia or Armenia
Dec 1918	Establishment of the Republic of Aras
1 Dec 1918	The first "Association for Defence of National Rights" [Müdafaa-i Hukuk Cemiyeti] is founded by Muslims in İzmir to protest a possible Greek annexation of the city, and is followed by similar associations for Thrace and the Eastern Provinces in the following days
2 Dec 1918	Tevfik Pasha reimposes press censorship after criticism against his premiership
4 Dec 1918	Foundation of the Wilsonian Principles Society by ex-Unionists and liberals alike. They request the United States to administer the Ottoman Empire as a Mandate the next day, to no avail. The organization shuts down in a couple months, but the mandate question in the Ottoman Empire continues
6 Dec 1918	British troops based in Syria occupy Kilis
7 Dec 1918	French troops occupy Antioch/Antakya
7 Dec 1918	Armenian–Georgian War over Lori. Britain brokers a ceasefire by the end of the month
11 Dec 1918	Kölemen Abdullah Pasha resigns as War Minister, after opposition from Great War veterans. He is replaced by Cevat Çobanli Pasha, Mustafa Fevzi Pasha becomes chief of the general staff
12 Dec 1918	Special courts-martials are opened in the War Ministry to try Enver and Cemal Pasha
14 Dec 1918	Tevfik Pasha inaugurates the Special Military War Tribunal to prosecute members of the CUP accused of war crimes. Several high ranking CUP members are arrested.
17 Dec 1918	French navy deploys troops in Mersina/Mersin to occupy the important port city
19 Dec 1918	French troops occupy Tarsus and Ceyhan and face the first exchanges of fire in Dörtyol in one of the opening acts of the Franco-Turkish War
20 Dec 1918	French troops occupy Adana, Cilicia's largest city
21 Dec 1918	Dissolution of the Ottoman Chamber of Deputies, though not the Senate, by the sultan Mehmed VI Vahdeddin, when the chamber attempted to censure Tevfik Pasha. He resigns anyway. This put an end to its third term that was previously dominated by Unionists since 1914. Elections are not called, but promised for next year.
21 Dec 1918	"Adana Association for Defense of National Rights" is founded.
23 Dec 1918	French troops occupy Osmaniye and İslahiye to eventually secure control over the Cilician Gates on 27 December. At the same time, British troops occupy Batum.
23 Dec 1918	Ottoman government issues a general amnesty except those suspected of war crimes. Many politicians arrested by the CUP since 1913 are rehabilitated
30 Dec 1918	Government decree to confiscate assets of a number of CUP adjacent enterprises
30 Dec 1918	Founding of the Society for the Rise of Kurdistan
30 Dec 1918	Following his visit to Paris in November to present Greece's territorial claims to the to be opened Paris Peace Conference, Eleftherios Venizelos reasserts these claims in a memorandum addressed to the British Prime Minister, David Lloyd George. They encompass much of Western Anatolia, and the area around the Sea of Marmara.

== 1919 ==
Date	Event
Jan 1919	Founding of the Guardian Soldier's Committee, also known as the Nigehbanists [Nigehban Cemiyet-i Askeriyesi], an anti-Unionist grouping in the Ottoman army
Jan 1919	Clashes between Armenia and Azerbaijan heat up in Zangezur and Nagorno-Karabakh, the Ottoman Empire lends covert assistance to Azerbaijan
3 Jan 1919	British troops based in Syria occupy Jarabulus.
8 Jan 1919	Anton Denikin merges several White Army formations to become Supreme Commander of the Armed Forces of South Russia. He begins a close cooperation with the Armenian Democratic Republic
9 Jan 1919	End of the successive First and Second Ardahan Congresses (opened 3 January).
10 Jan 1919	Reestablishment of the Freedom and Accord Party
10 Jan 1919	Siege of Medina ends in an Arab victory: Fahreddin Pasha and his troops who refused to lay down their arms after Mudros finally surrenders
12 Jan 1919	The first cabinet of the Grand Vizier Ahmed Tevfik Pasha takes up a new government. Changes in the War Ministry and General Chief of Staff do not affect the influence of officers opposed to territorial concessions to the Allies.
15 Jan 1919	British troops based in Syria occupy Aintab/Antep. The British occupation forces will be replaced by French occupation forces towards the end of the year.
18 Jan 1919	End of the Great Kars Congress (131 delegates) and the declaration of the Provisional National Government of the Southwestern Caucasus. Supported by Ottoman military command in Erzurum and opposed to incorporation into Armenia.
19 Jan 1919	Paris Peace Conference begins.
20 Jan 1919	Participation of Greece in the Southern Russia Intervention gains good will among the Allied Powers.
22 Jan 1919	Ottoman troops start withdrawing from Batumi/Batum.
23 Jan 1919	British troops occupy Eskişehir
23 Jan 1919	Last Ottoman forces still fighting in Yemen surrender to the British
29 Jan 1919	Former Unionists are arrested to be put on trial for war crimes and crimes against humanity, among them: Ismail Canbulat, Tevfik Rüştü, and Kara Kemal.
2 Feb 1919	British troops based in Syria occupy Marash/Maraş. The British occupation forces will be replaced by French occupation forces towards the end of the year.
6 Feb 1919	(or 25 January) Mehmed Reshid, a CUP leader and genocide perpetrator, escapes from prison and commits suicide during his escape from the police. This turns into a scandal as the Ottoman government is criticized for not being harsh enough towards former Unionists
8 Feb 1919	French general Franchet d'Esperey, commander-in-chief of Allied occupation forces in Turkey, arrives to Istanbul in an elaborate parade. Greeks and Armenians of the city approved of the entrance, Muslims are offended.
12 Feb 1919	"Association for Defense of National Rights" [Müdafaa-i Hukuk Cemiyeti] is founded in Trabzon, to be followed a parallel association in Samsun. These two associations will merge in a congress organized in Trabzon on 23 February. They declare their opposition to their incorporation into Armenia or a Pontic Greek Republic.
16 Feb 1919	Ottoman government publishes a note of protest against trying officers in foreign military courts as contrary to previously established international law. Britain and France cease arresting suspected war criminals, for now
21 Feb 1919	Oltu Congress by the Provisional National Government of the Southwestern Caucasus
23 Feb 1919	A number of Pontic Greek notables gather in Trabzon and take the decision to work towards the establishment of a Pontic Greek Republic in the vilayet of Trabzon. The first issue of the newspaper Pontos, a step in that direction, is published in Trabzon on 4 March. Chrysanthos of Trebizonde, the Greek Orthodox Metropolitan goes to Paris on 27 March and presents a report to the Conference on 2 May.
24 Feb 1919	Ahmet Tevfik Pasha reshuffles his cabinet, issues his third government since coming to office

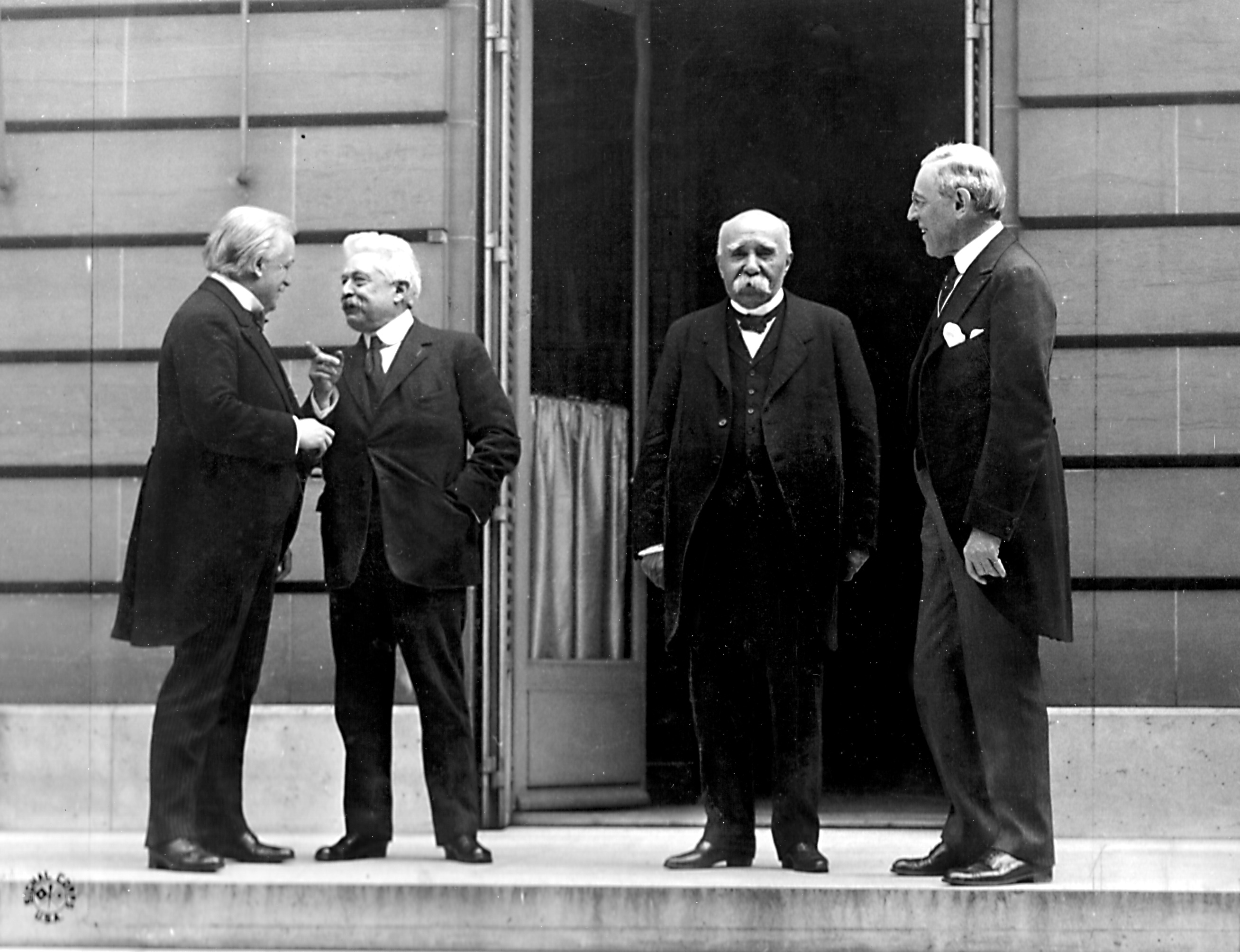
"The Big Four" during the Paris Peace Conference (from left to right, Lloyd George, Vittorio Emanuele Orlando, Georges Clemenceau, Woodrow Wilson)

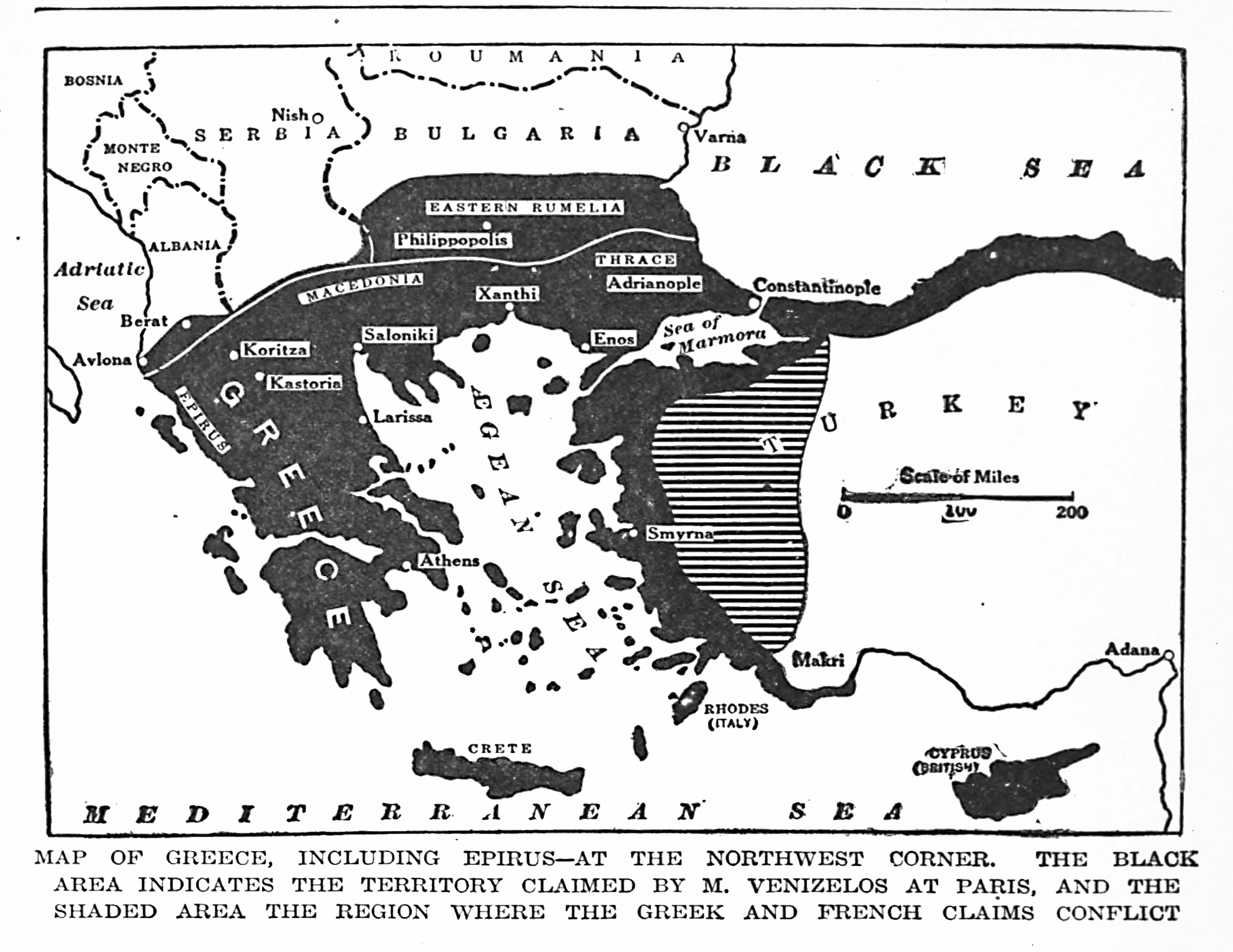
The Agreement of St.-Jean-de-Maurienne was overridden with the Greek occupation of Izmir which cause Italy having left the conference. In the absence of Italy, Greek and French territorial claims were clashed.

Date	Event
27 Feb 1919	Begun on 24 February, Venizelos presents Greece's territorial claims to the Paris Peace Conference.
27 Feb 1919	British troops based in Syria occupy Birecik. The British occupation forces will be replaced by French occupation forces towards the end of the year.
2 Mar 1919	Ottoman Sixth Army is disbanded after British pressure in order to secure Mesopotamia
3 Mar 1919	The Grand Vizier Ahmed Tevfik Pasha and his government resigns. Damat Ferid Pasha is appointed as grand vizier and forms his first government the day after. First cabinet since 1912 which excludes CUP members, though some nationalists remain high up in the war ministry. This is also the first and last time the Freedom and Accord Party form a cabinet, though in a month they will denounce Ferid's government. Anti-appeasement cliques in the War Ministry and General Staff are not significantly weakened
4 Mar 1919	The representatives of Britain, the US, France and Italy begin negotiations at the Paris Peace Conference on envisaged mandates for Syria, Cilicia and Armenia.
8 Mar 1919	New Istanbul Courts Martial is set up with the new government, and is harsher towards Unionists whether they participated in war crimes or not. A new wave of arrests falls on ex-members of the CUP: former Grand Vizier Said Halim Pasha and Ali Fethi
9 Mar 1919	200 British troops land on Samsun to repress activities of the anti-Greek warlord: Topal Osman
13 Mar 1919	Kâzım Karabekir Pasha is assigned to the command of the XV Corps based in Erzurum.
16 Mar 1919	Greek and Armenian communities of the Ottoman Empire, through their patriarchates, declare their relationship with the Ottoman dynasty and empire terminated. Any new election will be boycotted by these groups. This was an announcement but not an official policy
17 March 1919	The Izmir Self-Defence Society declares its opposition to Greek incorporation
18 Mar 1919	Two French gunboats disembark troops to the Black Sea ports of Zonguldak and Karadeniz Ereğli, commanding Anatolia's coal mining region.
21 Mar 1919	Béla Kun declares the establishment of the Hungarian Soviet Republic and announces his intention to militarily resist any Romanian expansion into Hungary stipulated in the Paris Peace Conference. First attempt by a former Central Power to reverse a potentially unfavorable peace settlement
22 Mar 1919	Known to be inclined to armed resistance to any occupation attempt and in view of the projected landing of Greek troops, Nureddin Pasha is relieved from his posts as interim governor of Smyrna/İzmir and from the command of XVII Corps based in that city.
24 Mar 1919	British troops based in Syria occupy Edessa/Urfa. The British occupation forces will be replaced by French occupation forces towards the end of the year.
28 Mar 1919	Italian troops occupy Adalia/Antalya, the region around which will remain comparatively calm throughout the war. This was done without the consent of the other powers of the Paris Peace Conference
30 Mar 1919	British troops occupy Merzifon
2 Apr 1919	Şakir Pasha takes Abuk Ahmed Pasha's job as War Minister, who himself replaced Ömer Yaver Pasha. Four War Ministry turnovers over the last four months. Only one turnover in the chief of the general staff this same period: Mustafa Fevzi Pasha to Cevat Çobanlı Pasha. Instability in the Ottoman military due to government attempts to purge Unionists and nationalists from the army. Demobilization is almost complete. Mustafa Kemal's contacts benefit from the situation, reaching ever higher positions which were previously unreachable due to the CUP's dislike of him and his friends. At some point during this period Kemal attended three audiences with Sultan Mehmed VI, and then secretly initiated contact with Italian Foreign Minister Count Carlo Sforza.
10 April 1919	Mehmed Kemal, kaymakam of Boğazlıyan, is hanged for his involvement in the Armenian genocide. His execution turns into a demonstration against the effort to prosecute Ottoman war criminals.

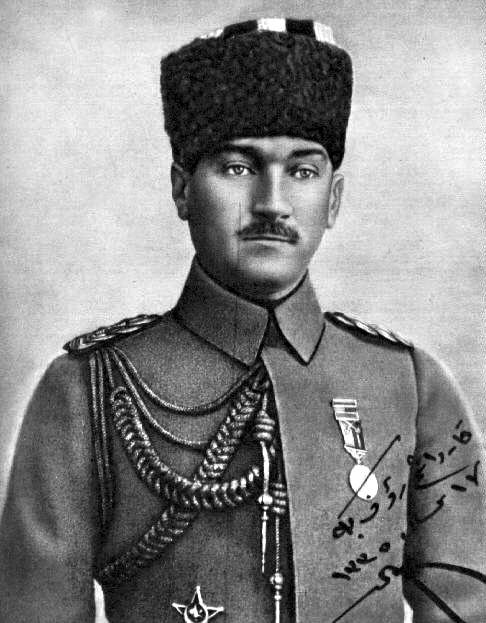
Mustafa Kemal Pasha, aged 38, on 17 April 1919 in a photograph signed for Rauf Orbay

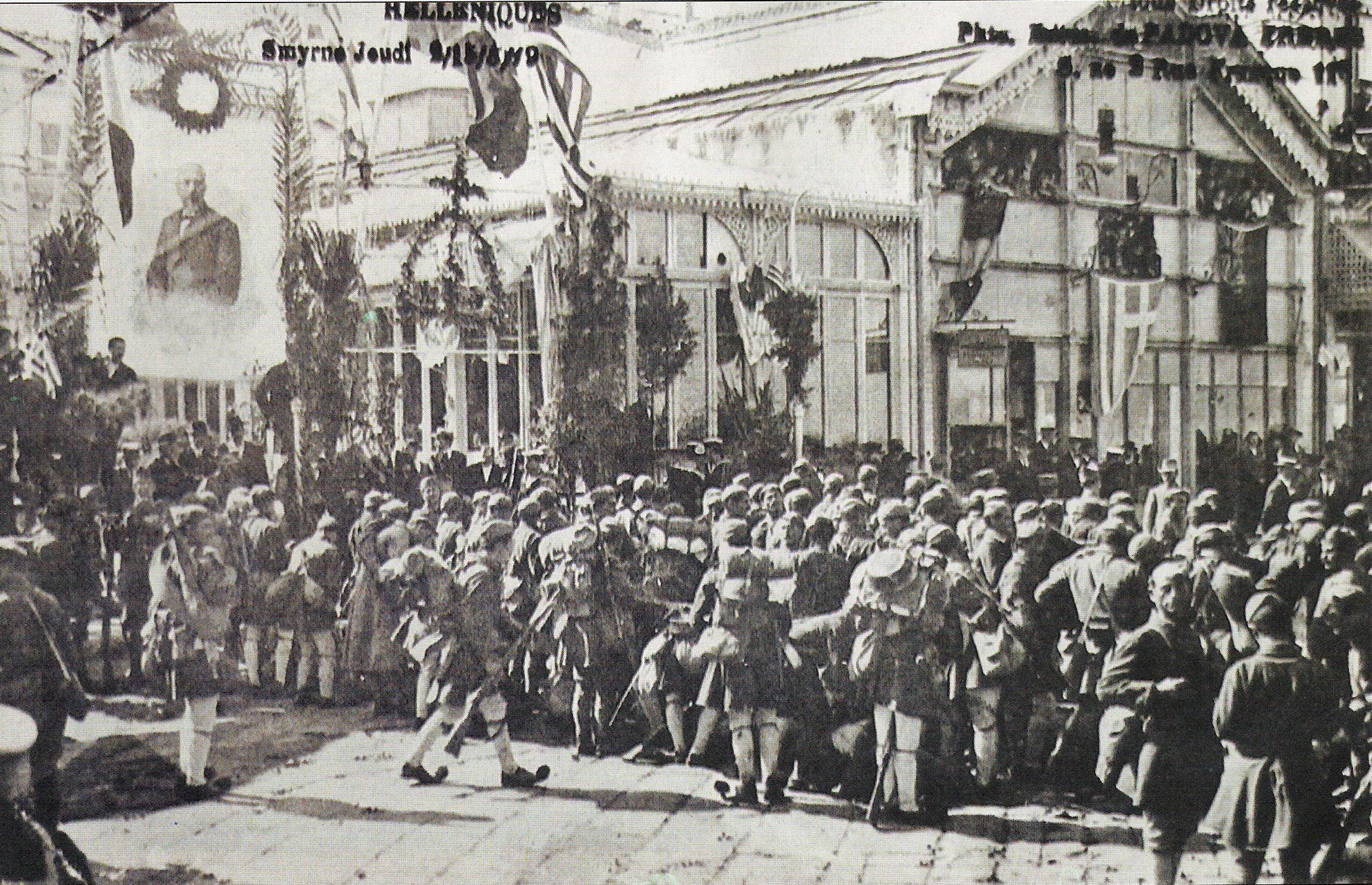
Greek troops in İzmir on 15 May 1919.

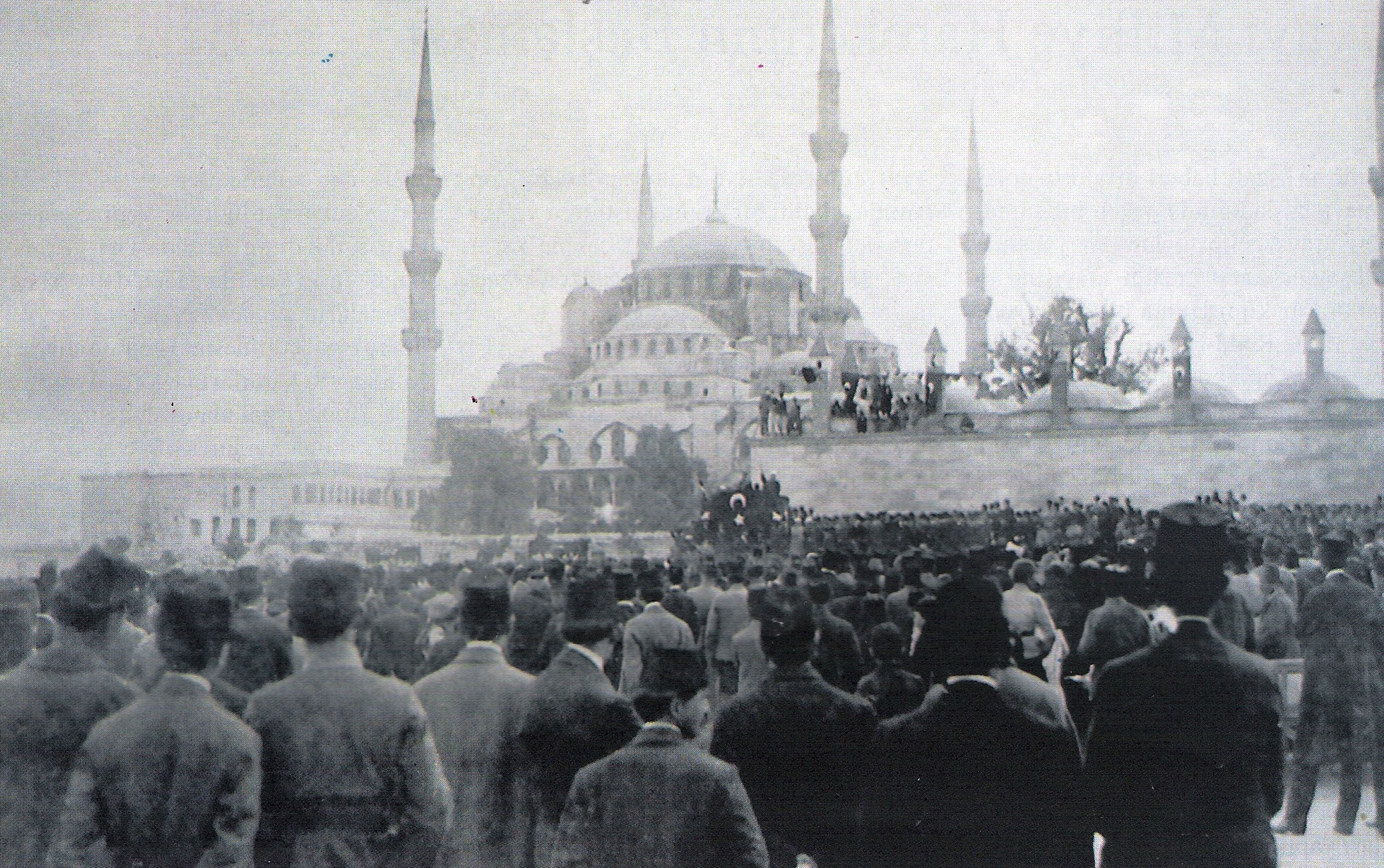
Public demonstration in Istanbul on 23 May 1919 in protest of the Occupation of İzmir, with Sultanahmet Mosque in the background.

Date	Event
12 Apr 1919	Greek political leaders claim sectarian violence between Greek refugees and Rumelian muhacir refugees in Ayvalık is coming close a "racial war" which necessitates military intervention, while the Ottoman government claims the incidents are isolated. The flagship of the Greek Navy, the cruiser Georgios Averof docks in the port of İzmir in a show of force for Greece.
15 Apr 1919	Hungarian Soviet Republic launches a preemptive strike on Romanian units, beginning the Hungarian–Romanian War.
16 Apr 1919	Commissions of Admonition [Heyet-i Nasîha] are dispatched from the capital to the provinces to shore up imperial support in provinces with high sectarian tensions. Members of the Ottoman dynasty: Prince Abdurrahim and Prince Cemaleddin, are received warmly by Muslims and receive no adoration from Ottoman Greeks and Armenians since the communal declarations of secession.
19 Apr 1919	Dissolution of the Provisional National Government of the Southwestern Caucasus after British 82nd brigade occupies Kars. Though administration of the territory falls to Armenia, the Paris Peace Conference is slatted to take up the issue some time in the near future
20 Apr 1919	Battle of Artvin results in Georgian victory, Artvin and Ardahan are occupied by Georgia
21 Apr 1919	Damad Ferid Pasha asks Admiral Calthorp for British military assistance in tamping down nationalist activities in Eastern Anatolia, but is denied this request. He turns to Mustafa Kemal Pasha to participate in the new inspectorate system of the streamlined Ottoman army.
24 Apr 1919	The Italian delegation, angry about the possibility of the Greek occupation of Western Anatolia, leaves Paris Peace Conference and does not return to Paris until 5 May. An Italian presence is established in Konya and Afyonkarahisar. Although Italy sends a warship to İzmir on 30 April as a show of force to prevent Greek occupation, the absence of the Italian delegation from the Conference shifts the allies towards Greece's claims to Anatolia.
28 April 1919	Greece withdraws its intervention force from Southern Russia (Crimea)
28 Apr 1919	Second phase of the Ottoman Special War Tribunal to prosecute Ottoman war criminals
30 Apr 1919	Mustafa Kemal Pasha is appointed the Inspector of the Ninth Army Troops Inspectorate. This title includes several wide-ranging military and civilian powers over Eastern Anatolia, where powerful army formations like the XV and III Corpse are headquartered.
May 1919	Britain initially deters an Armenian invasion of Aras, but allows the invasion to go through by the end of the month. Fighting continues into June
1 May 1919	First International Worker's Day celebrations in the Ottoman Empire are organized by the Turkish Socialist Party
2 May 1919	Britain, France, and the United States send ships to İzmir to deter a potential Italian landing in the city
3 May 1919	Kazım Karabekir Pasha arrives in Erzurum for his assignment as commander of XV corps
5 May 1919	Renewal Party and Ottoman Liberal People's Party banned for being continuations of the CUP.
6 May 1919	Largely as a result of British diplomacy, the Paris Peace Conference authorizes Greek forces to land in İzmir
8 May 1919	Greek troops based in Thessaloniki are ordered to sail toward İzmir in view of occupation.
8 May 1919	Miralay Sadık, returning to Istanbul from his Egyptian exile, once again takes over the Freedom and Accord Party
11 May 1919	Small Italian contingents occupy (rather symbolically, since the Ottoman administration is allowed to function intact) Fethiye, Bodrum and Marmaris and the surrounding regions.
11 May 1919	Kurdish Ali Batı rebellion in Diyarbekir against the Ottoman government, is suppressed by 19 May
12 May 1919	Admiral Arthur Calthorpe, signatory to the Armistice of Mudros on behalf of Britain, arrives in İzmir, in his capacity as British High Commissioner, to supervise the imminent Greek occupation of the city.
14 May 1919	Entente contingent of British, French, and Italian troops of the occupation force of Izmir occupies forts surrounding the city
14 May 1919	Formation of the Cancellation of the Annexation of Izmir, part of the defense of Rights Association. Organizers of the society schedule a jail break and loot the municipal armory and barracks to distribute to Muslims
15 May 1919	Greek forces land in Smyrna/Izmir. This is justified by Article VII of the armistice terms. The initial tension between Christians and Muslims of the city explodes the moment the Greek Army marches by the Ottoman barracks. For the city's Turkish population, the day is marked by the "first bullet" fired by Hasan Tahsin at the standard bearer at the head of the troops. This turned the city into a battlefield, and by the end of the day: 2 Greek soldiers and 9 civilians lay dead, and 8 Turkish officers and 5 soldiers lay dead. 47 civilians from all nationalities are wounded. The Greek army captures 693 personnel of XVII corp and 2000 what they deemed to be "irregulars". 2400 Turkish soldiers escaped Izmir to take up arms surrounding the city. Ottoman civil administration of the city continues. Reparations commissions are later established to compensate victims of the botched occupation ceremony, and the Greek army establishes courts martials to prosecute those that contributed to the chaos the previous day, including Greek soldiers. Greek diplomatic position is severely questioned Italy attempts to take over the occupation, but their demands are vetoed by Calthorpe.
15 May 1919	Damat Ferid Pasha resigns due to the botched landing ceremony, is reappointed by the sultan to form his second government. The landing is condemned by almost every Ottoman official and politician, and the government appeals to the conference to organize an investigation into Greek excesses in the landing
16 May 1919	After a last audience with the sultan, Mustafa Kemal Pasha departs from Istanbul on board the ship SS Bandırma for Samsun to take up his duty as Inspector of the Ninth Army Troops.
16 May 1919	Greek troops occupy the towns along the Karaburun peninsula west of İzmir (Urla, Çeşme, Seferihisar and Karaburun). Urla clashes
18 May 1919	Greek troops occupy Söke, situated a hundred kilometers south of İzmir at a key location that commands the fertile Menderes River valley.
19 May 1919	Mustafa Kemal Pasha lands in Samsun.
20 May 1919	Founding of the Friends of England Association [İngiliz Muhipleri Cemiyeti], whose membership included many Freedom and Accord members. Kiraz Hamdi Pasha becomes its first president
21 May 1919	Greek troops occupy Menemen and Torbalı, towards the north and the southeast of İzmir.
23 May 1919	A wave of demonstrations around the Ottoman Empire to protest against Greece's occupation of İzmir, the largest of these are held in Sultanahmet Square in Istanbul. Halide Edip was a central speaker in the protests
23 May 1919	Mahmud Barzanji revolts against the British occupation in Mesopotamia, shifting British focus away from the Caucasus.
23 May 1919	Greek troops occupy Ayasoluk/Selçuk to the south, Bayındır to the east and Phocaea/Foça to the north of İzmir.
23 May 1919	Aristidis Stergiadis, the Greek High Commissioner for Izmir who had arrived in İzmir on 21 May, authorizes orders for the occupation of Aidin/Aydın, Magnesia/Manisa and Turgutlu.
24 May 1919	Hüseyin Rauf leaves Istanbul to muster Circassian militia groups around the Marmara region to eventually employ them against the Greek Army. He meets with the commander of XVII corps, and Edhem the Circassian and his brothers. Final Ottoman troops evacuate Izmir, though gendarme units are allowed to stay
24 May 1919	The Ottoman government releases 14 nationalist prisoners. Britain protests this by deporting 67 nationalist prisoners to Malta and Mudros.
25 May 1919	Mustafa Kemal leaves Samsun to Havza, where he advocates for Muslim resistance to Greek occupation.
25 May 1919	Greek troops occupy Manisa.
26 May 1919	First Sultanate Council to discuss what the Ottoman Empire must do following the occupation of Izmir. The council is unsuccessful in coming to a conclusion.
27 May 1919	Greek troops occupy Aydın. Although the Meander/Menderes valley was not, strictly speaking, mandated for an occupation by Greek troops, the Italian Navy's movements off the coast of Kuşadası orient the Greek high command towards establishing a presence in the region.
29 May 1919	Greek troops occupy Kasaba (Turgutlu), Tire and Aivali/Ayvalık. Turks show their first resistance. Forces under the command of Lieutenant-Colonel Ali Çetinkaya check their enemy before retreating.
29 May 1919	Kemal calls on the units under his command to prepare for a struggle for independence, and calls for anti-occupation demonstrations. Another telegram sent soon after calls on Nationalist organizations to protest all peace treaties that would compromise Ottoman sovereignty, or which place Muslim majority territories under Christian minority rule
1 Jun 1919	Greek troops occupy Ödemiş after a six-hour fire fight in the Circassian village of Hacıilyas, ten kilometers west of Ödemiş, which prides itself for being the spot where the "first bullets" by irregular forces, soon to form into militias, were fired. The village is razed by the Greek army after the fighting. It would be reestablished, and renamed İlkkurşun ("first bullet" in Turkish).
1 Jun 1919	Damat Ferid Pasha leaves for the Paris Peace Conference with a delegation to present the Ottoman position to the allies. Mustafa Sabri is acting Grand Vizier
3 Jun 1919	Greek troops occupy Nazli/Nazilli, but they evacuate on 19 June following a number of raids on Greek positions by Turkish irregulars and subsequent Greek reprisals. Ahmetli is occupied the day after
5 Jun 1919	A small Greek expeditionary force acting without orders occupies the inland city of Akhisar, outside the mandated occupation zone, leading to public protests and a memorandum from the regional Turkish army command stationed in Balıkesir to the Allied representatives. The commander of the region, Yusuf Izzet Pasha mobilizes his troops. Called back by the High Commissioner Stergiadis, Greek troops evacuate Akhisar on 9 June, and the commanding officer will be imprisoned for twenty days for undisciplinary action.
6 Jun 1919	Hüseyin Rauf and Ali Fuad meet in Angora/Ankara and leave for Havza to meet Mustafa Kemal

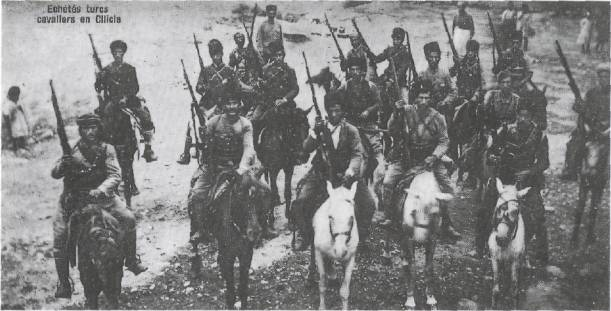
Kuvayi Milliye: Turkish militia in Çukurova region

Date	Event
8 Jun 1919	Ottoman War Ministry orders Mustafa Kemal to return to the capital after pressure from Calthorpe. This order was issued by Shevket Turgut Pasha despite his own protests
11 Jun 1919	Mustafa Kemal sends a communique to the sultan declaring that he does not want to be sent as a prisoner to Malta
12 Jun 1919	Greek troops occupy Pergamon/Bergama, beginning the Battle of Bergama. They are soon ambushed Yusuf Izzet Pasha's troops and the locally organized Turkish militia, Greek forces conduct a disorderly retreat to Menemen.
13 Jun 1919	Worried of possible arrest by British troops, Kemal Pasha leaves Havza for Amasia/Amasya
15 Jun 1919	Konstantinos Nider arrives in Izmir to take command of the Army of Asia Minor
16 Jun 1919	Interior Minister Ali Kemal orders telegraph offices to not accept protests of Greek occupation
16 Jun 1919	Malgaç Raid by Yörük Ali Efe on Greek army
17 Jun 1919	Menemen massacre by the Greek troops and irregulars which retreated from Bergama. Comes after the killing of the prefect Kemal Bey and the six Turkish gendarmes accompanying him the day before, 200 to 1000 Turkish civilians massacred. Since the landing at Izmir, Venizelos and Stergiadis have attacked Ottoman Greeks and local leadership for misunderstanding the delicate diplomatic Greece is in.
19 Jun 1919	Greek troops evacuate Nazilli in the south, while they take back Bergama in the north.
21 Jun 1919	Raid on Erbeyli by Turkish militia on Greek army. Followed by Raid on Erikli
21 Jun 1919	Amasya Circular issued after a conference by the commanders Mustafa Kemal, Hüseyin Rauf, Ali Fuat and Refet Pasha. It calls for a national movement against the occupying powers, delegates for a national congress to convene in Sivas, and a prior congress of Eastern nationalist organizations to convene in Erzurum. Kemal is put in a leadership role.
22 Jun 1919	Ahmed Rıza, Young Turk activist and president of the Ottoman Senate, once again embarks on a self imposed exile to Paris, doing so in support of Mustafa Kemal Pasha
23 Jun 1919	The Armenian Revolutionary Federation wins a landslide election for the Armenian parliament, after Hunchakian and Populist Party boycotts
June 1919	Beginning of the Alawite revolt of 1919 against French forces. The rebels will soon receive aide from Turkish nationalists
23 Jun 1919	Ali Kemal announces to the Ottoman military of Mustafa Kemal's authority being retracted
25 Jun 1919	Reacting to Damat Ferid Pasha's audacious delegation to Paris, the Council of Ten stated the Turks as a people could not evade responsibility for "murdering Armenians without any justification", and therefore culpability befalls on the whole Turkish people
26 Jun 1919	Ali Kemal and Shevket Turgut Pasha resign as interior minister and war minister respectively, after the two have an intense argument over Mustafa Kemal's mission. They are replaced by Reşid Adil and Ali Ferid.
26 Jun 1919	Battle of Tellidede between Greek army and Turkish militia ends in a Greek victory
27 Jun 1919	Mustafa Kemal departs from Amasya, fearing arrest from Colonel Ali Galip, and arrives at Sebasteia/Sivas
28 Jun 1919	In Balıkesir, the first of five congresses to be held in that city unites in a large forum the representatives of the Turks of Western Anatolia to figure out actions to be taken against Greek occupation. A larger meeting is decided to be organized in Philadelphia/Alaşehir.
28 Jun 1919	First Barzanji revolt is crushed by Britain. Mahmud Barzanji is taken to British India the year after.
28 Jun 1919	Signing of the Treaty of Versailles between the Allied powers and Germany.
29 Jun 1919	Battle of Aydın. The Greek troops carrying out reconnaissance patrols around Aydın and burn Turkish villages, but are repulsed by irregular forces under Yörük Ali on 27 June. Fires break out in one of the Turkish quarters of the city (Cuma quarter) and a massacre of civilians by the Greek Army ensues. Greek troops retreat from the city to Bilecik after four days due to resistance from the Efe. The Greek quarter is burned in turn, some among the Aydın Greek minority are killed or robbed. The Efe retreat back to the mountains after reportedly thousands of casualties from each side. 1000–4000 Ottoman Greeks are massacred by Kuva-yi Milliye. The Muslim population abandons the city and take refuge in the Italian occupation zone and towns further inland
30 Jun 1919	Mehmed VI officially orders the replacement of Mustafa Kemal Pasha as Third Army Troops Inspector (position was renamed). He appoints Karabekir Pasha as his replacement
3 Jul 1919	Mustafa Kemal arrives in Erzurum, and is greeted by Karabekir. The previous day, in Erzincan, he received a telegram from Mehmed VI which clarified the earlier communique: He didn't want Kemal dismissed, but that he should instead take a leave of absence in a city of his choice, reminding him that he would probably be arrested by Allied occupation troops if he returned to the capital, Istanbul. On 4 July Mustafa Kemal sends a telegram congratulating Mehmed VI of his first year on the throne.
3 Jul 1919	The American Committee for Relief in the Near East charters a fact finding mission in Eastern Anatolia to assess the destruction in the region following the Armenian genocide and destruction by the Russian and Turkish armies in the Caucasus campaign. They publish a report known as the Niles and Sutherland Report
4 Jul 1919	Greek reinforcements take back control of Aydın, burning another Turkish quarter in reprisal.
5 Jul 1919	Ottoman Special War Tribunal sentences Talat, Enver, Cemal, Dr. Şakir, and Dr. Nazım to death in absentia. The CUP is officially dissolved by the government, even though the party dissolved itself back in November 1918.
7 Jul 1919	Mustafa Kemal issues a telegraph from Erzurum to Ottoman commanders and governors to not accept giving up their posts if there is not a trustworthy (nationalist) officer to replace them
8 Jul 1919	Admiral Calthorpe demands the immediate recall of Mustafa Kemal Pasha and Refet Pasha from the War Ministry. Mustafa Kemal resigns from the Ottoman army, after he is informed that he was cachiered by the sultan. He is under the mercy of Karabekir Pasha, who pledges his support to Kemal
10 Jul 1919	Though the Society for the Rise of Kurdistan initially enjoyed influence with the Freedom and Accord Party and the Ferid Pasha government, its leaders are summoned to the Sublime Porte and warned not to engage in politics
11 Jul 1919	Commander in chief of the Greek Army Leonidas Paraskevopoulos arrives in Izmir to take command of Greek forces in Asia minor. New courts martials are opened to discipline Greek military personnel over the events of the last two months
15 Jul 1919	Damat Ferid Pasha returns from the Paris Peace Conference empty handed. Allied leaders considered his demands ridiculous, and Georges Clemenceau reiterated to Ferid that the Ottoman Empire would face a harsh peace treaty. Sheikh ul-Islam Mustafa Sabri Efendi sends a telegram to Paris Peace Conference accusing the Greek Army of committing atrocities in around Izmir and requests the conference to send a commission of inquiry to the region
18 Jul 1919	Establishment of the Inter–Allied Commission on the Events in Smyrna. Made up of representatives of the Big Four, with Greek and Ottoman observers attached. The commissioners go beyond their mandate of investigating potential missteps by the Greek military in Izmir from May–June, instead attacking the Allies on giving Greece a mandate to invade Ottoman Anatolia. The Commission disbands by 15 October 1919. The council also limits the area of operations of the Greek Army, outlined by General George Milne. Kuva-yi Milliye are easily able to make hit and run attacks from beyond the "Milne Line", or retreat into the Italian occupation zone
20 Jul 1919	Damat Ferid Pasha resigns after the failure of the Ottoman delegation to the Paris Peace Conference to obtain concessions from the Allies. However, Ferid Pasha is assigned to form his third government the day after. The new cabinet includes three nationalist generals.
21 Jul 1919	Erzurum Congress unites representatives of the Eastern provinces under the chairmanship of Mustafa Kemal Pasha and Kazım Karabekir Pasha. The congress lasts until 7 August 1919. They decided that the Ottoman Empire's borders upon the signing of the Armistice of Mudros are unconditional, that partition was unacceptable, if government in Istanbul can't fulfill these points, a new provisional government must be founded in Anatolia; the abolition of rights and privileges of non-Muslims, rejection of a League of Nations Mandate, and a national assembly to once again hold the government accountable. Another congress is scheduled to convene in Sivas on 4 September, which will be a national congress. Establishment of the Committee of Representation, a provisional government
29 Jul 1919	Venizelos–Tittoni Correspondence: Greece and Italy partially mend relations, come to an agreement over the two country's goals of expansion
30 Jul 1919	Karabekir receives a telegram from the War Ministry, ordering him to arrest Mustafa Kemal and Hüseyin Rauf. He doesn't follow through with the order
30 Jul 1919	Damat Ferid Pasha calls for new elections, but doesn't set a date
Aug 1919	Mustafa Kemal goes after the Karakol Society, making it clear the Turkish Nationalist Movement would have a new modus operandi from the CUP.
4 Aug 1919	The Hungarian–Romanian War ends with the occupation of Budapest by Romania. The first attempt of a Central Power to resist Allied demands failed
13 Aug 1919	Süleyman Şefik Pasha appointed War Minister
15 Aug 1919	British 27th Division evacuates from the Caucasus, weakening Armenia and Georgia's security. The British War Office was less idealist than Whitehall, and preferred to consolidate their position in Mesopotamia. Turkish nationalists are emboldened
16 Aug 1919	Alaşehir Congress of Turkish militia of western Turkey. Delegates deliberate for eights days over what actions to be taken against the occupation. Like the Istanbul nationalists, they refuse to send representatives to Sivas
28 Aug 1919	The King–Crane Commission completes their report, but is not released to the public until winter 1922
Sep 1919	Harbord Commission is established to study potential American interests in Eastern Anatolia. The commission publishes their findings in October 1919
4 Sep 1919	Sivas Congress unites representatives from all over Turkey in Sivas. The congress lasts eight days and calls for national unity. During the congress, the Ali Galip Incident in Malatya poses a momentary threat for the Turkish nationalists. The congress pledges loyalty to the sultan and his empire, and to never revive the CUP, though most members used to be CUP members. Establishment of the Association for the Defence of National Rights of Anatolia and Rumelia, and the mandate of the Committee of Representation to the entire Empire. They pledge to resist Armenian and Greek separatism by military means, and Allied imperialism. They reaffirm their commitment to establish a provisional government if the Istanbul government ceded additional territories to the allies. The nationalists decide not to request an American mandate. The Telegram War begins
10 Sep 1919	Signing of the Treaty of Saint-Germain-en-Laye between the Allied powers and Austria
11 Sep 1919	British troops evacuate from Eskişehir
13 Sep 1919	Mustafa Kemal severs the Nationalist movement's communications and relationship with Istanbul
16 Sep 1919	Balıkesir congress, where they decide whom to send to the next Nationalist congress in Ankara. This next congress will unite the Western Anatolian nationalists with the rest of the movement
18 Sep 1919	First prisoners arrested by Allied occupation troops are transferred to Malta
19 Sep 1919	Nationalist congress in Nazilli
20 Sep 1919	Sultan Mehmed VI issues a statement denouncing the Turkish nationalist movement, and postponing elections
21 Sep 1919	British forces evacuate Kütahya, Merzifon, and Samsun on the 25th
24 Sep 1919	Governor of Trabzon is arrested by Turkish nationalists. It becomes clear that true power lays in the army, which favors the Turkish nationalists. Still, nationalist officers in Istanbul are arrested by the Ottoman government
27 Sep 1919	First Bozkır insurrection in Konia/Konya against the nationalists, which lasts until 4 October, when the pro-Istanbul governor has to flee to the capital
30 Sep 1919	Damat Ferid Pasha announces his resignation as Grand Vizier after Britain refuses his request to deploy troops against the Turkish nationalists, putting an end to his first term as Grand Vizier and his third government. Ahmed Tevfik Pasha refuses a request from the sultan to return to the premiership
Oct 1919	Last Ottoman governor loyal to Istanbul flees his province
2 Oct 1919	Woodrow Wilson suffers a massive stroke, his health declines from then on. U.S. diplomatically withdraws from the Near East
6 Oct 1919	A new Ottoman government is formed under the new grand vizier Ali Rıza Pasha, a nationalist general. The new War Minister: Cemal Mersinli, is made an honorary member of the Committee of Representation, making him a liaison between the Nationalists and Istanbul. The next day, Kemal agrees to lift the ban on communication between the nationalists and Istanbul.
11 Oct 1919	Hacim Muhittin, head of the Western Anatolian Kuva-yi Milliye, and leader of the congresses of Balıkesir, Nazilli, Alaşehir, reluctantly accepts the primacy of the Sivas-based Committee of Representation under Mustafa Kemal
20 Oct 1919	Second Kozbır insurrection in Konya against the nationalist movement lasts until 4 November.
20 Oct 1919	The Nigehbanists disband, and reorganize into the weakened Red Dagger Committee [Kızıl Hançer Cemiyeti]
22 Oct 1919	Amasya Protocol between the Sivas-based Committee of Representation headed by Mustafa Kemal Pasha and the Minister of the Navy (later grand vizier himself) Hulusi Salih Pasha, representing the short-lived Ottoman government of Ali Rıza Pasha, in an effort to seek ways for preserving independence through joint efforts. Istanbul capitulates to the nationalists and adopts the parameters laid out in the Sivas Congress. Elections are called.
25 Oct 1919	Onset of the First Ahmet Aznavur insurrection
26 Oct 1919	Sheikh Eşref mutiny/Hart Incident in Harput against the Nationalists. Lasts until 24 December
29 Oct 1919	In an interview, Eleftherios Venizelos warns of Allied trepidation on imposing terms on the Ottoman Empire, and that the "Young Turks" [CUP] returned to power. He advocates for an American mandate over the straights and the expulsion of the Ottoman Sultanate from Europe.
29 Oct 1919	General Milne permits the Greek army wider latitude in crossing the Milne line for counter-insurgency operations
29 Oct 1919	French troops occupy Maraş and replace the British troops stationed in the city, despite opposition to the replacement by the city's inhabitants.
30 Oct 1919	French troops occupy Urfa and replace the British troops stationed in the city, triggering immediate resistance and starting the Battle of Urfa.
31 Oct 1919	Sütçü İmam incident in Marash inflames tensions in the city, leading to the Battle of Marash.
3 Nov 1919	Armenian–Georgian Treaty mediated by Britain
4 Nov 1919	Ceremony changing the occupation of Cilicia from British to French held in Adana. French authorities resettle surviving deportees of the Armenian genocide, occupation troops are mostly drawn from the French Armenian legion and colonial troops. Intercommunal violence in the region between returning Armenians and Muslims breaks out. Franco–Turkish War breaks out, Mustafa Kemal dispatches Kılıç Ali, and denounces French occupation of the region, calling for resistance
4 Nov 1919	Azerbaijan launches an invasion of Zangezur against Armania
5 Nov 1919	French troops occupy Antep and replace the British troops stationed in the city.
7 Nov 1919	Anticipating a peace treaty with Bulgaria, Greek troops move in to occupy Western Thrace. Crossing Nestos River, Greek troops start taking over the city and the region of Xanthi/İskeçe from Bulgaria, in the framework of the Treaty of Neuilly-sur-Seine.
8 Nov 1919	Khilafat Movement in British India declares their support to the Turkish nationalists under Mustafa Kemal
16 Nov 1919	Victory for the right in French elections
16 Nov 1919	Victory for the left in Italian elections
19 Nov 1919	United States Senate rejects the Treaty of Versailles, the United States withdraws from peace negotiations
19 Nov 1919	Founding of the Homeland of God Committee [İlâ-yı Vatan Cemiyeti] by Şerif Yahya Adnan Pasha and Kiraz Hamdi Pasha, an anti-nationalist pro-British society
21 Nov 1919	French troops tentatively occupy Mardin for one day and retreat from the city towards the evening of the same day, faced with prospects of a potentially bitter resistance by the population to a full occupation attempt.
22 Nov 1919	Anton Denikin declares Azerbaijan and Georgia will be reincorporated into Russia if the White Russians win the Russian Civil War
23 Nov 1919	Azeri invasion of Zangezur fails a truce is signed with Armenia
27 Nov 1919	Signing of the Treaty of Neuilly-sur-Seine by the Allied powers and Bulgaria. Population exchange between Bulgaria and Greece, Greek annexation of Western Thrace
29 Nov 1919	A long meeting between nationalist leaders in Sivas ends. They decide the new chamber of deputies will meet in Istanbul, but be briefed by Representative Committee elements before making the journey. The headquarters of the committee will be moved to Eskişehir. The Nationalists prepare to military defend the Ottoman Empire if the government gave in to foreign demands
1 Dec 1919	Eleftherios Venizelos returns to Athens for the first time since November 1918. He presides over the reopening of the Greek Parliament which was prorogued since Greece entered the war. He delivers a speech attacking the deposed King Constantine, the successful subduing the Bulgaria, and the soon to be ultimate triumph of Greek liberalism and the elevation of the Greek peoples through the realization of the Megali Idea
1 Dec 1919	Fighting again breaks out between Armenian and Azeri insurgents in Zangezur
8 Dec 1919	End of Picot–Kemal Talks which started on 5 December. First correspondence between France and the Turkish nationalists. They agree to a short truce.
9 Dec 1919	The United States withdraws from the Paris Peace Conference
14 Dec 1919	Negotiations between Armenia and Azerbaijan, collapses by 24 December
20 Dec 1919	After leaving Sivas, Mustafa Kemal meets with Alevi leader Ahmed Cemalettin Çelebi at Caesarea/Kayseri, who pledges allegiance to the Turkish nationalists
25 Dec 1919	Agulis massacre of Armenians by Azeri forces razes the town
27 Dec 1919	Mustafa Kemal Pasha arrives at Ankara.
29 Dec 1919	The Ottoman government reverses Mustafa Kemal's cashiering and returns his decorations, though he is not reinducted into the army

== 1920 ==
Date	Event
Early 1920	The National Defense Organization [Müdafaa-i Millîye Teşkilatı], also known as the M.M. Group, is founded to manage covert nationalist operations in Istanbul, is established. It would be active until the end of the conflict.
1 Jan 1920	Archbishop Chrysanthos of the Pontic Greek community goes to Armenia to discuss a potential federation, but the talks fail
6 Jan 1920	Debate in the British government leads to the defeat of anti-Ottoman hardliners, Britain would be willing to let the Ottoman Empire keep Istanbul
8 Jan 1920	Mustafa İsmet leaves Istanbul for Ankara to plan a nationalist resistance with Mustafa Kemal. In a debate among Nationalist leaders, they see war with Greece inevitable, and İsmet Pasha becomes the primary advocate for organizing a new regular army. Kemal Pasha agrees with him, forming the beginning of the Ordered Forces (Kuva-yi Nizamiye)
9 Jan 1920	Cafer Tayyar Pasha, commander of I Army Corps of Edirne, in anticipation of Eastern Thrace's annexation into Greece, declares martial law and a mobilization order in the Adrianople/Edirne Vilayet
10 Jan 1920	The League of Nations is established.
12 Jan 1920	The Association for Defense of National Rights for Anatolia and Roumelia (Anadolu ve Rumeli Müdafaa-i Hukuk Cemiyeti), led by Mustafa Kemal Pasha, overwhelmingly wins the 1919 Ottoman general election to no opposition and open the fourth (and last) Ottoman Parliament. The election was boycotted by the Freedom and Accord Party and Christian minorities. The parliament convenes in Istanbul. Of 168 members, only 72 are present on the opening day. Though Kemal Pasha was elected as a deputy of Erzurum, he decides to stay in Ankara as he believed the Chamber of Deputies would not be able to operate freely with Entente troops present in the capital. But many of his comrades leave for Istanbul anyway.
13 Jan 1920	Third series of Sultanahmet demonstration: 150,000 people demonstrate for Western Thrace, Eastern Thrace, and all of Anatolia to remain in the Ottoman Empire, and for Greece to leave Izmir
20 Jan 1920	Raymond Poincaré's term as French president ends, Paul Deschanel replaces him. Clemenceau resigns as French Prime Minister, but is replaced by Alexandre Millerand, who is not a Hellenophile.
20 Jan 1920	Allies demand the dismissal of War Minister Cemal Pasha Mersinli and Chief of the General Staff Cevat Çobanlı Pasha for being too close to the nationalist movement. Despite Mustafa Kemal's insistence they keep their jobs, the two capitulate.
20 Jan 1920	The Mehmet Kamil Incident ignites the city of Antep and the Battle of Antep starts with ambushes on French troops on roads between Antep-Maraş and Antep-Kilis. The battle will last almost a year and consist of urban combat and a siege.
21 Jan 1920	Start of wholescale urban warfare in Maraş (Battle of Maraş) with Turkish militia facing French troops, French Colonial Forces units and the French Armenian Legion auxiliaries.
21 Jan 1920	Conclusion of the Paris Peace Conference
22 Jan 1920	Azeri, Georgian, Armenian delegates meet in Tiflis/Tbilisi to coordinate an anti-Red Army defense as the Whites collapse, but fail
24 Jan 1920	Uprisings by Muslims in Kars which is under Armenian occupation.
28 Jan 1920	Akbaş arms depot raid in Eastern Thrace by Turkish Nationalists
28 Jan 1920	The Ottoman Parliament, gathered in a secret session, ratifies the decisions adopted in Erzurum Congress and Sivas Congress and the passes the National Oath (Misak-ı Millî), a demand for new Ottoman borders which reflect the front lines on the Armistice of Mudros. First time Turkey (Türkiye) is used instead of the Ottoman Empire (Devlet-i Aliyye Osmani) in an official document
31 Jan 1920	Mustafa Kemal fails to be elected president of the Ottoman parliament. Tension is increasing between nationalists in Istanbul and those in Ankara
3 Feb 1920	Britain officially ends their support to Anton Denikin's White Army
9 Feb 1920	Parliament approves Ali Rıza Pasha's cabinet reshuffle. Mustafa Fevzi Pasha returns as War Minister. The Istanbul nationalists organize themselves into the National Salvation Group (Felah-ı Vatan İttifakı), against Mustafa Kemal's Anatolia–Rumelia Defence of Right's Association in Ankara
12 Feb 1920	French troops evacuate Maraş due to overwhelming resistance.
12 Feb 1920	Negotiations for Ottoman Partition continue with the opening of the Conference of London
13 Feb 1920	Armenia pacifies Azeri insurgents in Zangezur
16 Feb 1920	Second Ahmet Anzavur Rebellion
17 Feb 1920	In the London Conference France mentions it intends to return Cilicia to the Ottoman Empire
26 Feb 1920	Mustafa Kemal Pasha denounces the Karakol Society for attempting to negotiate for Bolshevik aide to the Turkish Nationalists without his permission: Shalva Eliava–Karakol talks.
27 Feb 1920	The Armenian delegation delivers their claims in the London conference. The conference doesn't support Armenian expansionism in Cilicia.
29 Feb 1920	Greek Army General Headquarters, and Leonidas Paraskevopoulos, transfers from Thessaloniki to Izmir. The Field Army of the Army of Asia Minor is put under the direct command of General Paraskevopoulos, effectively dissolving the Field Army command. Ottoman Greek citizens are encouraged to volunteer in the Greek occupation army, an act of treason under Ottoman law
3 Mar 1920	Grand vizier Ali Rıza Pasha resigns after the Allies pressure him to impose the Milne Line on Nationalist paramilitary surrounding Izmir, which have been engaging in continuous skirmishes with the Greek Army since 15 May 1919
8 Mar 1920	The new Ottoman government is formed under grand vizier Hulusi Salih Pasha, another nationalist general, who earlier agreed to the Amasya Protocols
8 Mar 1920	Proclamation of Syria as a Kingdom by Faisal bin Hussein, beginning of the Franco-Syrian War.
10 Mar 1920	The London Conference decides a formal occupation of Istanbul is necessary. The Italians notify Hüseyin Rauf, who then notifies Mustafa Kemal
14 Mar 1920	Armenian forces crush the Kars revolt, but the brutality of the operation, which includes ethnic cleansing and massacres, discredits the Armenian delegation in London, and the Armenian diaspora vis a vis the Democratic Republic of Armenia
15 Mar 1920	Milne gives permission to Venizelos for Greek forces to go beyond the Milne Line
16 Mar 1920	De jure Occupation of Istanbul. The Ottoman Parliament is raided by the Allied troops, as well as other key locations across Istanbul in a large-scale military operation. A number of deputies, war criminals, and journalists (Kara Vasıf, Hüseyin Rauf, Cemal Mersinli Pasha, Cevat Çobanlı Pasha, and others) are arrested the same day or in the following days, and sent to exile in Malta (Malta exiles). British Indian troops undertake the Şehzadebaşı raid. The nationalist movement in Istanbul is decapitated, leaving Ankara the sole capital of Turkish nationalist resistance. Mustafa Kemal arrests 18 British officers in Ankara in retaliation for the Malta exiles
18 Mar 1920	Last session of the last Ottoman Parliament, a black cloth covers the pulpit to remind deputies of their forced piers' absence, whereupon they vote to adjourn indefinitely. Many of the remaining members soon leave for Ankara to constitute the core of the new assembly, some of whom receive French transport
19 Mar 1920	Mustafa Kemal Pasha calls an election for a national assembly with extraordinary powers in Ankara. Members of the defiled Ottoman Parliament are free to join.
19 Mar 1920	United States Senate rejects the Treaty of Versailles again
20 Mar 1920	Ankara forces under Ali Fuat Pasha pressure British withdrawal from Eskişehir
23 Mar 1920	Armenians rise up against Azeris in Karabakh
26 Mar 1920	Armenian forces retake Agulis. Battle of Shusha results in an Armenian victory but the sacking of the town
2 Apr 1920	Grand Vizier Hulusi Salih Pasha resigns under Allied pressure
3 Apr 1920	The Harbord Commission releases its report, concluding that an Armenian mandate under the United States is plausible
4 Apr 1920	Anton Denikin resigns as commander of Southern White Russian forces. He is replaced by Pyotr Wrangel. Western support for Caucasian republics is possible as Denikin was opposed to Georgian and Azerbaijani sovereignty
5 Apr 1920	Damat Ferid Pasha is appointed once again Grand Vizier, and declares the Turkish nationalists to be rebels, plunging the Ottoman Empire into a civil war. He again attempts to diplomatically flank Greece through his pro-Allied appeasement, hoping to obtain an Entente expedition to put down the nationalists instead of the Greeks. Fighting breaks out in the Marmara basin
6 Apr 1920	Establishment of the Anatolia Agency as the media organ of the nationalist movement
10 Apr 1920	Mehmed VI officially dissolves the Chamber of Deputies and doesn't call a new election. The Ottoman Senate continues to function. Sheikh ul-Islam Dürrizade Abdullah issues a fatwa that qualifies the Turkish Nationalists as infidels, calling for the death of its leaders.
10 Apr 1920	End of the Conference of London
11 Apr 1920	French occupation troops evacuate Urfa due to overwhelming resistance
13 Apr 1920	Uprising against Turkish Nationalists in Düzce due to the Sheik ul-Islam's fatwa. The revolt reaches to Bolu on 18 April, Gerede on 20 April, Saphrampolis/Safranbolu on 25 April, Çerkeş on 30 April. The movement engulfed northwestern Anatolia for about a month.
13 Apr 1920	David Lloyd George announces Britain will not assist the Kurds to achieve an autonomous state
14 Apr 1920	Last conference between Armenia, Azerbaijan, and Georgia to resolve their difference breaks down
16 Apr 1920	Edhem the Circassian's militia puts down the Second Ahmet Anzavur rebellion
16 Apr 1920	A counter fatwa prepared by the mufti of Ankara, Rifat Börekçi, endorsed by a congress of Anatolian ulema declares the Sultan–Caliph Mehmed VI a prisoner of the infidels, and the Muslim people to rise up against the foreign powers. The Sheik ul-Islam's fatwa is ruled null and void
18 Apr 1920	Establishment of the Ottoman Caliphate Disciplinary Army, also known as the Caliphate Army (Hilafet Ordusu or Kuva-yi İnzibatiye), which cooperate with the Düzce and Anzavur rebels. While the Allies permitted the establishment of the army, it is only half a division strong. Fighting between this new formation and the nationalists on the Anatolian Marmara coast
18 Apr 1920	Azeri-Armenian ceasefire
22 Apr 1920	In a Karabakh Armenian congress, they decide to obtain Armenian help
22 Apr 1920	Commander Mahmut Nedim Hendek of the 24th division is killed in fighting the Düzce rebels. The formation dissolves, a defeat for the nationalist movement
23 Apr 1920	The Turkish Grand National Assembly, holds the opening session of its first term and elects Mustafa Kemal Pasha as Speaker of the Assembly. Some 100 members of the dissolved Ottoman Parliament, including its president Celalettin Arif, escaped the Allied roundup and joined the 190 deputies elected around the country. It declares itself the sole legal authority in the Ottoman Empire
24 Apr 1920	Polish–Soviet War begins in earnest, distracting the Red Army from a full invasion of the Caucasus and defeating White Army remnants.
26 Apr 1920	Though it started on 19 April, the San Remo conference determines the allocation of League of Nation Mandates to administer former Ottoman-ruled lands of the Middle East, now occupied by the Allies. They decide to reduce the territory Armenia will get in a peace treaty, and to only provide logistical support to Armenia. See San Remo Oil Agreement. Woodrow Wilson is invited to draw the Armenian borders, and in exchange for Allied support in granting Eastern Thrace to Greece, Venizelos promises using the Greek army to defeat the Turkish nationalists and impose the coming peace treaty on the Ottoman Empire
26 Apr 1920	Mustafa Kemal Pasha sends a letter to Lenin, seeking Bolshevik aid. He promises to support Soviet aims in Azerbaijan and Georgia if they support his aims in Armenia. The letter will be answered officially and favorably by Chicherin on 3 June.
27 Apr 1920	Mustafa Fevzi Pasha, many times Ottoman War Minister and high-ranking officer arrives in Ankara. His defection will warrant a wave of officers from Istanbul to defect to the nationalists. Kemal Pasha makes Mustafa Ismet becomes Chief of Staff of the regular army, on Fevzi's recommendation
27 Apr 1920	Start of the Red Army invasion of Azerbaijan, proclamation of the Azerbaijan Soviet Socialist Republic the next day which quickly takes control over the country, the invasion being supported by the Turkish nationalists. The ASSR and RSFSR demand Armenia to end to the conflict over Karabakh
29 Apr 1920	The Grand National Assembly passes a law which proscribes death to traitors and its opponents. The Pontic Greek leadership have the most to lose with the law
30 Apr 1920	Armenia dispatches a delegation headed by Levon Shant to negotiate with the Soviets
2 May 1920	1920 Georgian coup attempt
3 May 1920	Mustafa Kemal is voted head of government of the Grand National Assembly, while also being Speaker. Beginning of the First Cabinet of the Executive Ministers of the GNA
3 May 1920	Second National Congress of Western Armenians in Paris, is boycotted by supporters of the Armenian Democratic Republic (see Boghos Nubar and the Armenian National Delegation)
6 May 1920	Suppression of a revolt in Konya
6 May 1920	Mustafa Kemal rejects a request by Karabekir to invade Armenia. He will reject more requests soon after
6 May 1920	Since his return to Athens, Eleftherios Venizelos has been shoring up his political position responding to calls for a new election that it must come after a peace treaty is signed with the Ottoman Empire. Today he delivers a speech, offering amnesty to his political opponents which opposed him during the National Schism, while increasing the state of siege. He declares that only a peace treaty, and victory against the Turkish nationalists, would heal the national schism and cease the threat the deposed King Constantine has to Greece
7 May 1920	Treaty of Moscow: The RSFSR de jure recognizes Georgia, the Communist Party of Georgia is legalized
10 May 1920	Bolshevik coup attempt in Armenia. The coup attempt was not supported by Moscow
11 May 1920	Mustafa Kemal Pasha and five other prominent names of the national movement are condemned in absentia to death sentence by the military tribunal in Istanbul. The other five condemned are Ali Fuat Pasha, Kara Vasıf, Ahmed Rüstem Bilinski, Abdülhak Adnan (Adıvar) and his wife Halide Edip (Adıvar).
11 May 1920	Damat Ferid Pasha arrives in Paris to evaluate the draft peace treaty negotiated by the Allies
11 May 1920	Red Army invasion of Karabakh, which Armenian forces withdraw from. Submission of the Karabakh Council to Soviet Azerbaijan
12 May 1920	Bekir Sami and Yusuf Kemal leave for Moscow to secure Ankara diplomatic relations with the RSFSR
12 May 1920	Renewed activity by Circassian militias led by Ahmet Anzavur on the Anatolian Marmara coast. His third rebellion is suppressed by 20 May
15 May 1920	First Yozgat Rebellion. Would be suppressed by Ankara forces on 27 August. Battle of Geyve between Istanbul and Ankara is an Ankara victory
17 May 1920	President Woodrow Wilson accepts the invitation to draw a new Turkish–Armenian border
20 May 1920	Cemil Çeto uprising by Kurds is crushed by 7 June
25 May 1920	Zile rebellion against the nationalists
27 May 1920	Yenihan insurrection
27 May 1920	Greek forces occupy Komotini/Gümülcine from Bulgaria, per the Treaty of Neuilly-sur-Seine, and anchor themselves up to the River Maritsa
27 May 1920	Battle of Karboğazı Pass ends in victory for the Turkish nationalists, 530 French soldiers are taken prisoner. 20 day truce signed between the Turks and French
31 May 1920	Ganja revolt against the Soviets in Azerbaijan ends
1 June 1920	Split between Miralay Sadık's Freedom and Accord Party and the Moderate Freedom and Accord Party, supported by Sadık's political enemies: Damat Ferid Pasha and Mustafa Sabri Efendi.
1 Jun 1920	United States Senate votes to reject an American mandate over Armenia
1 Jun 1920	Mardin insurrection against the Turkish nationalists. It will be put down by 8 December
2 Jun 1920	French occupation troops are forced to evacuate Kozan.
4 Jun 1920	French occupation troops are forced to evacuate the entire region of Urfa, east of Euphrates.
4 Jun 1920	Signing of the Treaty of Trianon between the Allied powers and Hungary
4 Jun 1920	Düzce revolt comes to an end
8 Jun 1920	The French evacuate from Karadeniz Ereğli on the Black Sea coast, but officially occupy Zonguldak on 18 June.
9 Jun 1920	The Grand National Assembly authorizes a limited operation to retake Sarikamish/Sarıkamış on 4 June. Kâzım Karabekir assigned command of the Eastern Front. Will soon assume all military and civilian authority in the region on 13/14 June, mobilizing XV corps
10 Jun 1920	The SS Hornsey leaves from Britain to deliver weapons and war materiel to Armenia. This is the only arms shipment from a Western power to Armenia. Georgia will confiscate much of the materiel. The shipment arrives by July–August
12 Jun 1920	Dramalı Rıza Bey and 9 of his nationalist comrades are executed for allegedly conspiring to assassinate Damat Ferid Pasha, Said Molla, and Ali Kemal
14 Jun 1920	Second Yozgat insurrection
18 Jun 1920	Ali Fuad Pasha is appointed commander of the Western Front to resist a Greek offensive
19 Jun 1920	Kurdish Milli tribe uprising
Jun 1920	1920 Iraqi Revolt against British occupation
19–23 Jun 1920	Skirmishes between Armenian forces and Turkish and Kurdish forces in Hotli
19 Jun 1920	Independence Loan Campaign and the Coal Fund by the Armenian government and Armenian diaspora respectively
20 Jun 1920	Skirmishing between Greek and Italian forces at the Meander river
20 Jun 1920	Mustafa Kemal postpones the Sarıkamış operation
21 Jun 1920	Çopur Musa uprising in Afyon
22 Jun 1920	Greek troops occupy Akhisar.
23 Jun 1920	Greek army launches a wide offensive across western Anatolia, from the southern shores of the Sea of Marmara to the Meander River valley, possibly timed in order to pressure the Ottoman government to sign a peace treaty with the Allies. This was permitted by Britain after an action between Turkish militia and British troops in Izmit/Nicomedia
23 Jun 1920	The Turkish speaking Greek Orthodox town of Fulacık is sacked and razed by Muslim militia. Greece and the Istanbul government accuse Ankara of orchestrating the massacre, Ankara accuses Istanbul. Anatolian Greeks will organize militia groups which cooperate with the Greek army which persecute Muslims loyal to the GNA
24 Jun 1920	Greek troops occupy Salihli and the lignite mining region of Soma-Kırkağaç.
25 Jun 1920	The Ottoman government disbands the Caliphate Army after successive defeats by regular Ankara troops.
25 Jun 1920	British troops land and occupy Mudania/Mudanya
25 Jun 1920	Greek troops occupy Alaşehir.
27 Jun 1920	Kula Incident against the GNA
28 Jun 1920	Britain turns over Batum to Georgia
28 Jun 1920	Greek troops occupy Kula.
30 Jun 1920	Greek troops occupy Balıkesir and Köseler
30 Jun 1920	Leonidas Paraskevopoulos requests from Venizelos to focus the military campaign to quickly capture Afyonkarahisar–Eskişehir, which would have put the army in a good position to launch operations towards Konya and Ankara. This is denied by Venizelos, who instead wants to peal away forces to occupy Eastern Thrace in anticipation of the peace treaty with the Ottoman Empire, fearing renewed threat from a new Bulgarian–Ottoman cooperation. This significant decision gives Ankara forces more time to reorganize and build up these important logistical centers
1 Jul 1920	Greek troops occupy Adramyttium/Edremit, last Aegean port held by the Turkish Nationalists.
2 Jul 1920	Greek troops occupy the Marmara ports of Panderma/Bandırma and Biga.
5 Jul 1920	Anatolian Railways rolling stock ("Anadolu Şimendiferleri") taken under Ankara's control, consisting of a single line along Ankara-Polatlı-Eskişehir-Bilecik-Kütahya-Çay-Akşehir. (see History of rail transport in Turkey)
8 Jul 1920	Greek troops occupy Bursa, a former Ottoman capital. The occupation was ordered by Leonidas Paraskevopoulos and the British army, without the knowledge or consent of Venizelos
10 Jul 1920	Kaç Kaç incident in Cilicia.
11 Jul 1920	Greek troops occupy Nicaea/İznik.
11 Jul 1920	French occupation troops evacuate Birecik due to Turkish resistance.
20 Jul 1920	İnegöl uprising is suppressed by 20 August
20 Jul 1920	Greek troops occupy Eastern Thrace: Rodosto/Tekirdağ, Heraclea/Marmara Ereğli, Çorlu, Adrianople/Edirne. After signing a peace treaty with the Ototman Empire, the Greek parliament votes to annex Eastern Thrace.
22 Jul 1920	Second Sultanate Council deliberates draft peace treaty to turn into the Treaty of Sèvres. Last consultative council of the Ottoman Empire
24 Jul 1920	French victory in the Franco-Syrian War. Dissolution of the Kingdom of Syria
30–31 Jul 1920	Attempted assassination of Venizelos in Paris sparks pro-Venizelos riots in Athens, leading to the murder of opposition politician Ion Dragoumis
31 Jul 1920	Fifth Damat Ferid Pasha government, the Moderate Freedom and Accord Party provide cabinet members
Aug 1920	Prosecution of Ottoman war criminals by the Ottoman government halted
4 Aug 1920	Greek troops occupy Gallipoli/Gelibolu, on the Dardanelles.
10 Aug 1920	In Sèvres, the grand vizier Damat Ferid Pasha and three other Ottoman ministers sign the stillborn Treaty of Sèvres. Due to the absence of the Ottoman Parliament dissolved in April, Istanbul does not ratify the treaty.

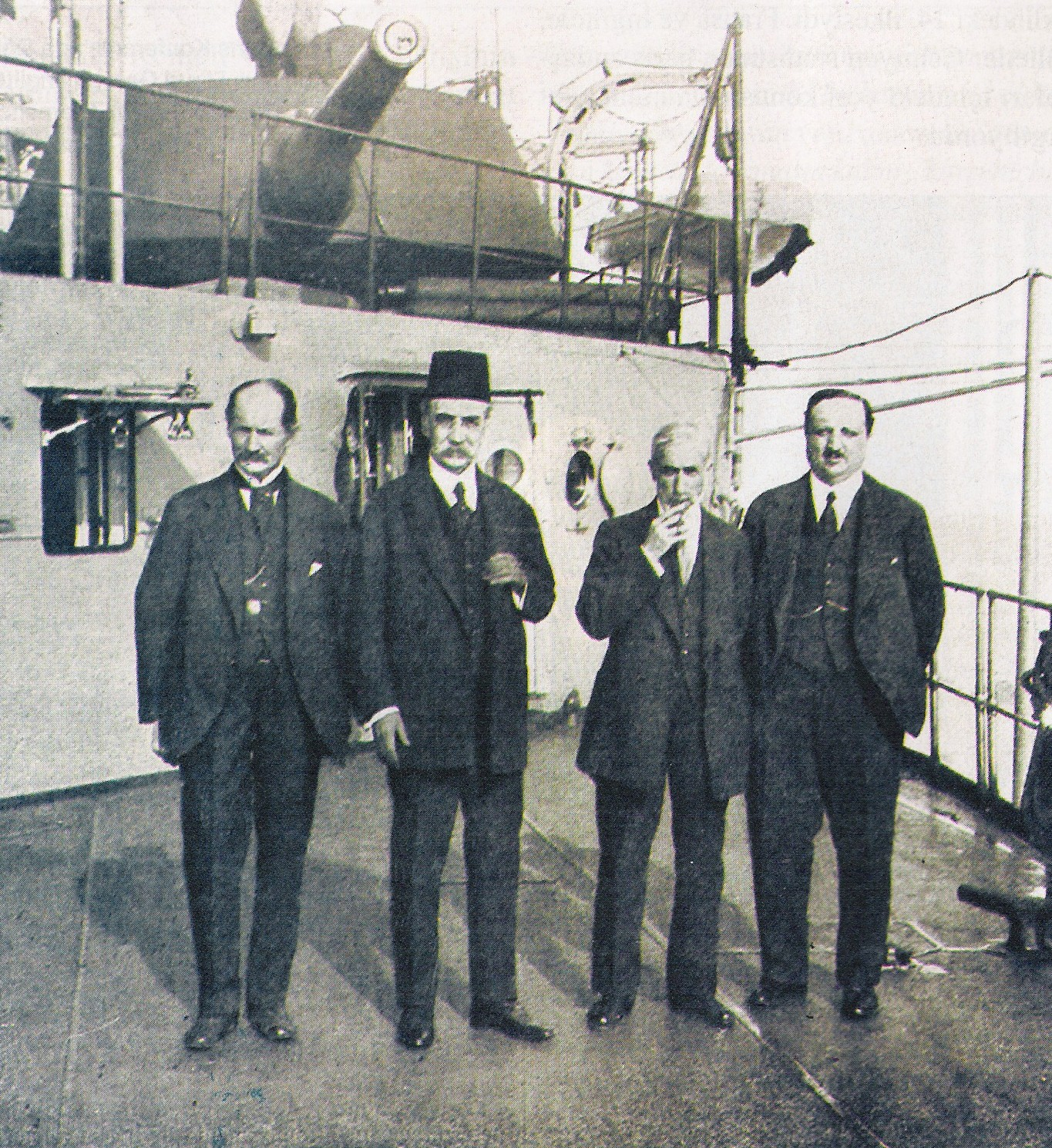
The four signatories of the Treaty of Sèvres. From left to right, Rıza Tevfik, the grand vizier Damat Ferid Pasha, minister of finance Mehmet Tevfik Biren and ambassador Reşad Halis

Date	Event
19 Aug 1920	The Grand National Assembly announces that it does not recognize the Treaty of Sèvres and declares the citizenship of the ministers which signed the treaty were stripped. Indeed, all four will be included among the 150 personae non gratae of Turkey after the war.
28 Aug 1920	Greek troops occupy Ushak/Uşak and Afyonkarahisar.
1 Sep 1920	Congress of the Peoples of the East, Enver Pasha delivers a speech
4 Sep 1920	Tal Afar uprising by Iraqi Turkmen, also known as the Kaçakaç Rebellion, on the Al-Jazeera front is suppressed by the British
5 Sep 1920	End of Battle of Oltu is victory for Turkish militia against Armenian militia
7 Sep 1920	Dutluca village is razed and inhabitants massacred by the Greek Army. Other villages around Yalova are similarly razed soon after such as Bayırköy and Paşayayla
7 Sep 1920	Syrian rebels under Ibrahim Hananu sign a cooperation agreement with Ankara forces against France. Hananu receives significant support from the Second Army
7 Sep 1920	Dolmabahçe Palace, residence of the crown prince Abdul Mejid, is blockaded by Istanbul police after reports of Mustafa Kemal Pasha inviting and arranging for his defection to Ankara to presumably lead the nationalists in his name.
10 Sep 1920	Elections are called for 25 October in Greece
10 Sep 1920	First congress of the Communist Party of Turkey held in Baku
11 Sep 1920	Establishment of Independence Tribunals by the Ankara government, modeled off the Revolutionary Tribunals of the French Revolution. They held wide jurisdiction and powers, being made up of MPs in the Grand National Assembly. They function until 17 February 1921.
19 Sep 1920	Founding of the Salahiye Lodge Committee [Tarikat-ı Salahiye Cemiyeti] by Kiraz Hamdi Pasha, an attempt to erect an Islamic Masonic organization. Its membership is made up of the previous Homeland of God Committee.
24 Sep 1920	Beginning of the Turkish-Armenian War.
21 Sep 1920	According to Henri Gouraud, the Hananuist rebels took control of Antioch, as well as disrupting supplies, cutting roads, and raiding villages
29 Sep 1920	Turkish victory over Armenian forces in the Battle of Sarikamish.
2 Oct 1920	Konya rebellion, is suppressed by Ankara forces four days later
7 Oct 1920	Damat Ferid Pasha is sentenced to death by an Independence Tribunal in Ankara
11 Oct 1920	Turkish victory over French in Battle of Kovanbaşı
12 Oct 1920	Blockade of Dolmabahçe Palace ends
15 Oct 1920	Damat Ferid Pasha resigns for health reasons
18 Oct 1920	Founding of an official Turkish Communist Party as a controlled left-wing opposition, whose members are mostly Ankara ministers
21 Oct 1920	Ahmed Tevfik Pasha returns to the premiership, with the hope he could come to an agreement with Ankara. The Ottoman government ceases military opposition to Ankara.
22 Oct 1920	French troops evacuate Saimbeyli due to Turkish resistance.
25 Oct 1920	In Athens, Alexander of Greece dies, after having been bitten by a monkey. He is succeeded by his predecessor, Constantine I, who did not enjoy good relations with the Allies. Elections are postponed to 1 November.
28 Oct 1920	Inconclusive Battle of the Gediz between Greek and Ankara forces. GNA decides to disband irregular forces and form an orderly army
30 Oct 1920	Turkish victory over Armenian forces in the Battle of Kars.
2 Nov 1920	Republican Warren Harding wins a landslide victory in the 1920 United States presidential election over Democrat James Cox, putting isolationists in charge of the White House
7 Nov 1920	Turkish victory over Armenian forces in the Battle of Alexandropol.
9 Nov 1920	Turkish victory over French in Battle of Kanlı Geçit
13–16 Nov 1920	White Russian forces Evacuate from the Crimea. Transports pass through the Dardanelles, some emigres settle in Istanbul. With the end of the Southern Front of the Russian Civil War, Allied interest in the Black Sea wanes.
18 Nov 1920	In Athens, Prime Minister Eleftherios Venizelos, architect of Greece's advance into Anatolia, loses the 1920 Greek legislative election, and is replaced by a series of cabinets of lesser stature, also paving the way for more royal involvement into politics.
24 Nov 1920	End of Battle of Fadıl between Turkish militia and French is Turkish victory
29 Nov 1920	RSFSR invades Caucasian republics, starting with Armenia
1 Dec 1920	Demirci Mehmet Efe Uprising: Circassian contingent revolted against the Ankara government, the revolt suppressed by 30 December
2 Dec 1920	Turkish victory in the Turkish-Armenian War and signature of the Treaty of Alexandropol/Gyumri, between Turkey, as represented by the Grand National Assembly, and Armenia.
5 Dec 1920	Mustafa Kemal meets with a delegation from Istanbul headed by Salih Pasha and Ahmet İzzet Pasha in Bilecik to discuss a potential rapprochement between Istanbul and Ankara. Kemal Pasha arrests the delegation, whereupon they are brought to Ankara. The two statesmen are allowed to return to Istanbul in March 1921.
Winter 1920	Hananuist rebels take Idlib and expel French forces from the city
Mid-December 1920	French forces counterattack and retake Idlib
27 Dec 1920	Edhem the Circassian revolts against the Ankara government. He is convinced to lay down his arms by 23 January
30 Dec 1920	Second Yozgat rebellion crushed by Ankara forces

== 1921 ==
Date	Event
9 Jan 1921	First Battle of İnönü between Turkish and Greek forces. The battle lasts three days and ends with a victory for the Ankara forces under İsmet Pasha's command
16 Jan 1921	Aristide Briand becomes French Prime Minister
20 Jan 1921	Ankara government constitution goes into effect
24 Jan 1921	Mustafa Fevzi Pasha becomes head of government of the Grand National Assembly, though Atatürk retains his position as Speaker. Start of the Second Cabinet of Second cabinet of the Executive Ministers
25 Jan 1921	Allied representatives gather in Paris and decide to convene Greek and Turkish (both Istanbul and Ankara governments) representatives to another conference in London to discuss possible modifications of clauses of the Treaty of Sèvres. Ahmed Tevfik Pasha, representing Istanbul, immediately announced Ankara to be the legitimate government of Turkey
28 Jan 1921	Founders of the Communist Party of Turkey are assassinated while traveling to Batum. To this day, it is not known if Istanbul, Ankara, or supporters of Enver Pasha were responsible
28 Jan 1921	Publication of edict by Istanbul recognizing the Grand National Assembly
9 Feb 1921	Antep's Turkish forces surrender to French forces after 384 days of fighting.
12 Feb 1921	Red Army launches an invasion of Georgia, concludes on 17 March
13 Feb 1921	Start of the February uprising by Dashnaks against the Bolsheviks
21 Feb 1921	The conference on a revisal of the Treaty of Sèvres opens in London. It will last until 12 March. The Ottoman grand vizier Ahmed Tevfik Pasha yields the right to speak to the representatives from Ankara. The proposals of the conference will not be accepted by the Grand National Assembly.
2 Mar 1921	Agreement between France and Ankara after the Alemdar incident.
6 Mar 1921	Koçgiri rebellion breaks out
7 Mar 1921	French troops evacuate Kadirli, Feke, Haruniye/Düziçi, and Bahçe after resistance and attacks by Turks.
9 Mar 1921	Signature of the Cilicia Peace Treaty in London between the Ankara government foreign minister Bekir Sami Kunduh and the French Prime Minister Aristide Briand. The French agree to evacuate Cilicia and renounce their claim to the region. The Armenian minority of the region is largely expelled. The treaty will be replaced by the Treaty of Ankara (20 October 1920). Turkish support for Hananu continues covertly
11 Mar 1921	Kazim Karabekir's forces enter Batumi
15 Mar 1921	Assassination of Talaat Pasha: CUP Leader, Grand Vizier, and Armenian genocide perpetrator, by Soghomon Tehlirian, as part of Operation Nemesis, in Berlin
16 Mar 1921	Ankara and London sign a prisoner swap: The 64 remaining Malta exiles are to be swapped for 22 British prisoners of war
16 Mar 1921	Signing of the Treaty of Moscow, a friendship agreement between the RSFSR and Ankara. First state to de jure recognize the Grand National Assembly (the Armenian Democratic Republic actually did so first but was soon conquered by the Bolsheviks). War materiel from Russia arrive in Ankara. Karabakh and Batum ceded to the Soviets
20 Mar 1921	Battle of Batum results in a Georgian victory, Turkish troops withdraw from the city. Georgia surrenders Batumi to the Bolsheviks soon after.
26 Mar 1921	Second Battle of İnönü between Turkish and Greek forces. The battle lasts five days and ends with a victory for the Turkish troops under İsmet Pasha.
1 Apr 1921	French troops evacuate Karaisalı after resistance and attacks by Turks.
2 Apr 1921	Suppression of the February uprising, Yerevan is retaken by the Bolsheviks
8 Apr 1921	Battle of Aslıhanlar–Dumlupınar begins between Turkish and Greek forces. The battle lasts until 15 April and ends with a Greek victory, as the Turkish offensive under Refet Pasha fails to encircle and destroy the Greek I Army Corps.
27 Apr 1921	Prince Ömer Faruk attempts to defect to the Nationalists but is rebuffed by Mustafa Kemal
15 May 1921	Victory for anti-Socialists in Italian elections
19 May 1921	Cabinet reshuffle in the Fevzi Pasha government
23 May 1921	Allied commission sent to investigate Greek war crimes on Yalova Peninsula concludes, report that Greek forces committed systematic atrocities against Muslim inhabitants of the peninsula.
1 Jun 1921	Inter-Allied Commission of Enquiry submits report of the İzmit massacres, irregular Turkish militia massacres of the local Christian population
9 Jun 1921	Henry Franklin-Bouillon of France arrives in Ankara as an unofficial but direct representative of the French Prime Minister Aristide Briand, to discuss ending the stalemate of the Franco-Turkish War.
16 Jun 1921	Ankara authorizes the deportation of all Greek males between ages 16 and 50 that remained in Samsun
17 Jun 1921	Koçgiri rebellion is suppressed
21 Jun 1921	Ineboli/İnebolu, an important logistical center, is shelled by the Hellenic Navy. It will be shelled again less intensely, on 30 August.
21 Jun 1921	French troops evacuate Zonguldak end of foreign occupation of the western Black Sea.
10 Jul 1921	Battle of Kütahya–Eskişehir between Turkish and Greek forces. The battle lasts till 24 July and ends with a Greek victory, but Turkish forces escape encirclement.
13 Jul 1921	Republic of Mountainous Armenia conquered by Bolsheviks
30 July 1921	Enver Pasha arrives in Batum to potentially usurp the Turkish nationalist movement from Mustafa Kemal, the Trabzon Defence of Rights Association supports him
4 Aug 1921	Mustafa Kemal Pasha is made Commander-in-Chief by vote of the Turkish Grand National Assembly.
7 Aug 1921	National Obligations [Tekâlif-i Milliye] are published in Ankara, putting Anatolia in a state of intense war economy. Commissions will disperse throughout Anatolia to confiscate materiel and conscript men
20 Aug 1921	Conclusion of the Amasya trials, hundreds of Greek community leaders of the Pontus region are executed
23 Aug 1921	Battle of the Sakarya between Turkish and Greek forces. The battle lasts till 13 September and ends with a Turkish victory.
6 Sep 1921	Some of the Malta exiles escape from captivity and flee to Germany
9 Sep 1921	Miralay Sadık and Gümülcineli İsmail take over the Friends of England Society
9 Oct 1921	Third Battle of Afyonkarahisar ends.
13 Oct 1921	Signature of the Treaty of Kars, between the three Soviet Republics of the Caucasus (Azerbaijan, Georgia and Armenia) and the Ankara government.
20 Oct 1921	Treaty of Ankara signed between France and the Ankara government putting an end to the Franco-Turkish War, and establishing the protocol of the evacuation of French troops from southern Anatolia. Ankara stop supporting Hananu, especially since his movements' collapse over the summer
15 Nov 1921	French troops evacuate Islahiye.
5 Dec 1921	Assassination of Said Halim Pasha, CUP Grand Vizier, as part of Operation Nemesis
7 Dec 1921	The British troops evacuate Kilis.
25 Dec 1921	French troops evacuate Antep.

== 1922 ==
Date	Event
3 Jan 1922	French troops evacuate Mersin and Dörtyol.
5 Jan 1922	French troops evacuate Adana, Ceyhan and Tarsus.
7 Jan 1922	French troops evacuate Osmaniye.
15 Jan 1922	Raymond Poincare becomes French Prime Minister
25 Jan 1922	İsmail Hakkı Tevfik Pasha, son of Grand Vizier Ahmed Tevfik and damat to the Sultan, defects to the Nationalists
17 Apr 1922	Assassination of Behaeddin Şakir and Cemal Azmi, key CUP leaders and genocide perpetrators, as part of Operation Nemesis
7 Jun 1922	Bombardment of Samsun by the Greek Navy
12 Jul 1922	Hüseyin Rauf, back in Ankara, is appointed Head of Government. Fourth cabinet of the Executive Ministers of Turkey
21 Jul 1922	Assassination of Cemal Pasha, key CUP leader, as part of Operation Nemesis
22 Jul 1922	Founding of the Second Group as a parliamentary opposition to Kemal's supporters in the Grand National Assembly
4 Aug 1922	Enver Pasha is killed in the Basmachi revolt
26 Aug 1922	Battle of Dumlupınar between Turkish and Greek forces. The next day, Turkish troops re-capture Afyonkarahisar while in the north, İznik is retaken for the second time. The battle lasts till until 30 August in a Turkish victory. The Greek army collapses, while the Turkish armies drive towards the Mediterranean in the Great Offensive.
30 Aug 1922	Turkish troops retake Kütahya.
31 Aug 1922	Turkish victory in the Battle of Derbent against British troops on the Al Jazira front.
1 Sep 1922	Turkish troops retake Uşak.
2 Sep 1922	Turkish troops retake Eskişehir.
3 Sep 1922	Turkish troops retake Eşme and Ödemiş regaining access to the Aegean Sea basin.
4 Sep 1922	Turkish troops retake Bilecik, Söğüt, Bozüyük, and towns along the Gediz River valley such as Simav, Kula and Tire.
5 Sep 1922	Turkish troops retake towns along the Menderes River valley such as Nazilli, Sultanhisar and Kuyucak, as well as Alaşehir. Greek army sets fire to Manisa
6 Sep 1922	Turkish troops retake Balıkesir, İnegöl, Akhisar and Sokia/Söke.
7 Sep 1922	Turkish troops retake Aydın, its surrounding towns, Kuşadası, Kasaba (Turgutlu), and Torbalı near İzmir. In Athens, the Petros Protopapadakis government resigns.
8 Sep 1922	Turkish troops retake Manisa, Nif/Kemalpaşa, Edremit, Burhaniye and Havran in the environs of İzmir.
9 Sep 1922	Turkish troops retake İzmir after nearly three and a half years.
10 Sep 1922	Metropolitan Chrysostomos of Smyrna is killed by a lynching mob
11 Sep 1922	Turkish troops retake Bursa and Geumlek/Gemlik in the north, as well as Foça and Seferihisar around İzmir.
11 Sep 1922	Revolution in Greece: Venizelist officers stage an uprising that deposes the royalist government, which they hold responsible for Greece's defeat against Turkey
13 Sep 1922	Great Fire of Smyrna that lasts till 22 September.
14 Sep 1922	Mahmud Barzanji launches another revolt, establishes the Kingdom of Kurdistan (1921–1925)
15 Sep 1922	Turkish troops retake Ayvalık, whereupon the Greek population of the city is conscripted into labor battalions.
17 Sep 1922	Action at Bandırma, last military action of Greek army in Asia Minor. Last Greek troops evacuate Asia Minor on 19 September.
22 Sep 1922	Turkish troops re-assume control of the city of Çanakkale and its surrounding towns after almost four years, setting off an international crisis known as Chanak Crisis. Britain almost starts a war against the Ankara government
27 Sep 1922	Abdication of Constantine I of Greece, he is succeeded by George II
10 Oct 1922	Britain signs the Anglo-Iraqi Treaty of 1922. Mandatory Iraq doesn't sign until 1924
11 Oct 1922	Signing of the Armistice of Mudanya
19 Oct 1922	David Lloyd George resigns as British Prime Minister as a result of the Chanak Crisis (see Carlton Club meeting). He is succeeded by Bonar Law on 23 October
19 Oct 1922	Refet Pasha arrives in Istanbul to parlay with the Istanbul government
25 Oct 1922	Greek troops evacuate from Eastern Thrace. With them are 300,000 to 400,000 Greeks from the region fearing reprisal from the Turkish nationalists
31 Oct 1922	Benito Mussolini becomes Italian prime minister.
1 Nov 1922	The Grand National Assembly votes to separate the office of the Sultanate and Caliphate, and abolishes the Sultanate. Refet Pasha informs the Allied Commissioners of his intention to seize control of the administration in Istanbul on behalf of the Grand National Assembly government, due to Istanbul's lack of legitimacy.
4 Nov 1922	Ahmed Tevfik Pasha resigns as the last Ottoman Grand Vizier. Mehmed VI doesn't appoint a replacement
5 Nov 1922	Refet Pasha, unofficial ambassador of Ankara to Istanbul, announces to the Sublime Porte that the Istanbul government is dissolved, ergo its ministries are liquidated.
15 Nov 1922	Elections in Britain. David Lloyd George's downfall concludes when his supporters suffer massive defeat, Bonar Law secures his Conservative majority
17 Nov 1922	Departure of the last Ottoman sultan Mehmed VI from Istanbul.
19 Nov 1922	The Grand National Assembly elects Abdul Mecid II as Caliph
20 Nov 1922	Opening of the Lausanne Conference
28 Nov 1922	Conclusion of the Trial of the Six in Greece, six deposed ministers of the royalist government are executed by the Venezelist junta
2 Dec 1922	Publication of the King–Crane Report

== 1923 ==
Date	Event
30 Jan 1923	During the Lausanne Conference Greek and Turkish delegations agree to a Population exchange between Greece and Turkey. The Conference will then be adjourned until 23 April 1923 due to disagreements on other points.
17 Feb 1923	Opening of İzmir Economic Congress, which will last till 4 March, as a forum to determine the principles of economic policy to be conducted by the new state.
12–13 Apr 1923	Final Congress of the CUP organized by Kara Kemal, the decision is made not to participate in the upcoming 1923 general election
2 May 1923	Sultan Mehmed VI arrives in Italy for his exile
28 Jun 1923	1923 election for the Grand National Assembly in order to adopt the Lausanne Treaty with a more unanimous parliament. The Second Group is no more
24 Jul 1923	Signing of the Treaty of Lausanne, establishment of the International Straits Commission
4 Aug 1922	Hüseyin Rauf resigns as head of government in protest of the Lausanne Treaty, Ali Fethi is appointed by Mustafa Kemal on the 14th as Head of Government. Establishment of the fifth cabinet of the Executive Ministers
23 Aug 1923	Allied forces start evacuating Istanbul as per the Treaty of Lausanne.
9 Sep 1923	Founding of the Republican People's Party (CHF).
23 Sep 1923	Last Allied troops evacuate from Istanbul.
6 Oct 1923	First Turkish troops enter Istanbul.
29 Oct 1923	Proclamation of the Republic of Turkey, Mustafa Kemal Pasha is elected the first president

== 2000s ==
Date	Occurrence
13 Jan 2006	Turkish veteran of the war, Pvt. Ömer Küyük, dies at age 106.
25 Mar 2007	Turkish veteran of the war, Pvt. Veysel Turan, dies at age 108.
2 Apr 2008	Turkish veteran of the war and last Turkish veteran of World War I, Sgt. Yakup Satar, dies at age 110.
11 Nov 2008	Last Turkish veteran of the war, Lt. Mustafa Şekip Birgöl, dies at age 105.

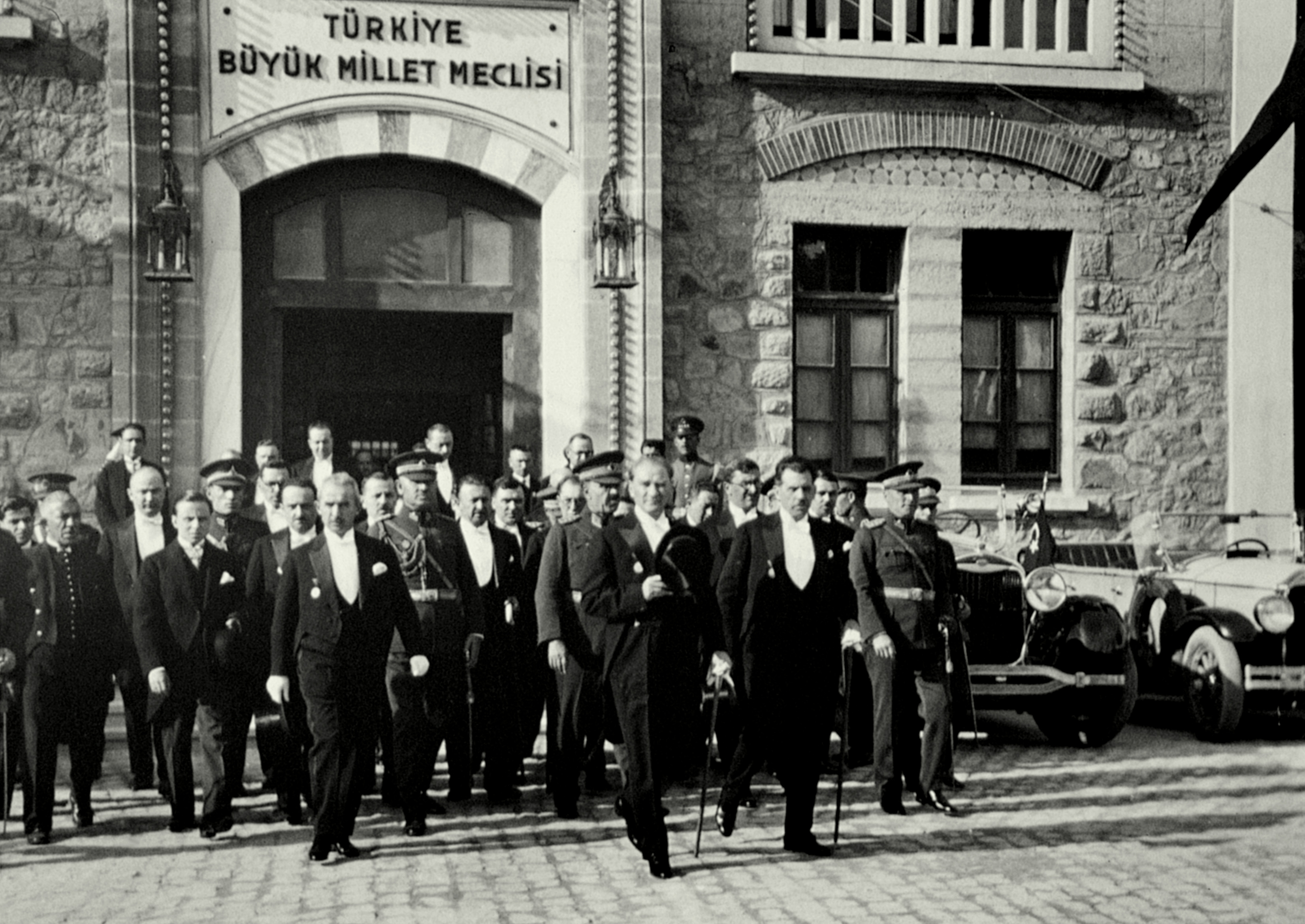
Mustafa Kemal Atatürk as President, in front of the National Assembly the on 7th anniversary (1930) of the foundation of the Turkish Republic (with, to his right, the PM İsmet İnönü, and behind him, Field Marshal Fevzi Çakmak)

== See also ==
- Timeline of Mustafa Kemal Atatürk
- Outline and timeline of the Greek genocide
- List of massacres in Turkey
- The Making of Modern Turkey

== Sources and references ==
- A chronology of Atatürk's life and the Turkish War of Independence by the Turkish Ministry of Culture (in English)
- Turkish Ministry of Interior Affairs monthly based calendar of capture and re-capture of cities during the war (in Turkish)
- Compendium of documents and bibliography relating to Provisional National Government of the Southwestern Caucasus by the Turkish Grand National Assembly (in Turkish)
- Report of the Inter-Allied Commission of Inquiry (May-September 1919) by the Members of the commission; Adm. Bristol, the US Delegate - Gen. Hare, the British Delegate - Gen. Bunoust, the French Delegate - Gen. Dall'Olio, the Italian Delegate. The statements in defense of the Greek government presented by Col. Mazarakis. (in English)
- Mango, Andrew. Atatürk: The Biography of the Founder of Modern Turkey. 1999
- The Extermination of Ottoman Armenians by the Young Turk Regime (1915-1916) Raymond Kevorkian
- Travlos, Konstantinos (2020). Salvation and Catastrophe: The Greek-Turkish War, 1919–1922. Lexington Books. ISBN 9781498585088.
