= Liberation of Balıkesir =

- Part of the Greco-Turkish War (1919–22)
Date	September 6, 1922
Location	Balıkesir
Result	Turkish victory

Belligerents
Turkish National Movement	Kingdom of Greece

On September 6, 1922, the Turkish Army entered the city of Balıkesir and liberated it from the Greek occupation.

== History ==
The Kuva-yi Milliye movement started after the Greek occupation of the Aegean region and spread as independent local organizations. The people of Balıkesir had a very important role in the establishment of these local organizations. Balıkesir is also known as the "City of Kuvâ-yi Milliye" as it was the city where Kuvâ-yi Milliye started.

== Balıkesir Redd-i Ilhak Society ==
On May 16, 1919, the people of Balıkesir came together at the Reading Dormitory in the building where Balıkesir High School is located and protested against the occupations.[2] Mehmet Vehbi Bolak, after mentioning the persecution after the Occupation of İzmir, continued with the following words; "These tragedies are about to befall Balıkesir. This cannot be prevented by correspondence and protest. Let's establish a Reddi-i İlhak committee to reject the annexation." The foundations of the national struggle were laid in secret meetings in Alaca Mescit. On this occasion, the 41-member committee and the people gathered in Alaca Mescit founded the Balıkesir Kuvâ-yi Milliye and supported the national struggle led by Mustafa Kemal. On May 15, 1919, upon the Occupation of Izmir, among those who heeded the call of the Mayor of that day, Keçecizade Mehmet Emin Efendi, were Karesi Deputy Mehmet Vehbi Bey, Mayor Keçecizade Mehmet Emin Bey, Yırcalızade Şükrü Efendi, Hasan Basri Çantay and a total of 41 people who were fully authorized to take all kinds of decisions.

The prominent people of the city, especially Mehmet Vehbi Bolak, gathered at the Reading Dormitory where the Kuvâ-yi Milliye Museum is now located. At the meeting, it was understood that nothing would help and the following words of Leblebici Raşit Efendi became the decision, the spark was lit with this sentence, and Kuvâ-yi Milliye was ignited; "The force that will turn the enemy back is at the end of the barrel."

== Balıkesir Congress ==
On May 18, 1919, those who gathered in Alaca Mescit on the occasion of mevlit, after listening to the mevlit, decided to reject annexation and to fight for national struggle. Afterward, Alaca Mescit, where they met regularly, decided to fight armed struggle. With the reading dormitory, Alaca Mescit meetings, and Balıkesir Congresses, the first serious movement against the enemy's occupations in the region came from Balıkesirli civilians and intellectuals. With their villagers and townspeople, Balıkesirli people decided to defend themselves without receiving instructions from anywhere. The people of Balıkesir, who came together by organizing five congresses, fought against the Greek armies on four fronts for 14 months and announced to the world public opinion that the people of Balıkesir and the Turkish nation would not accept occupation and captivity. All this shows that the first congress was convened in Balıkesir, the first bullet was fired in Balıkesir Ayvalık and the last bullet was fired in Bandırma. Balıkesir is the only city in the Aegean that ended the enemy occupation with its own means. During the most important periods of the National Struggle, SES Newspaper, published by Hasan Basri Çantay in Balıkesir, became the loud voice of Balıkesir and the Anatolian people who stood by the Kuvâ-yi Milliyeciler. Mehmet Akif Ersoy writes in his letter to the first issue of SES Newspaper: "If you don't want to hear the voice of the enemy, wake up to this voice, it is the voice of a brother; When you get up, you will see that it is evening, From

== The first days of the occupation ==
After the occupation, the Greek Command, fearing an ambush, thinking that the retreating Turkish forces were in the mountains, waited for their troops to gather regularly in Balıkesir. The Greek Command called the members of the Freedom and Entente Party, who said "Welcome" to them, for help. From the lists they provided, the people who had served the Kuvâ-yi Milliye, who had not fled but remained in the city, were identified one by one and were rounded up and imprisoned. One of the first things the Greek Command did was to replace the officers and telegraphists at the Post Office. Greek and Armenian officers were brought in their place.

The supporters of the Hürriyet and Entente Party, who went on a "Kuvâci hunt" with Greek flag bandanna and ribbons on their arms, handed over 36 people to the Greek Command. The day after the occupation, Greek soldiers and local Greeks looted the properties and houses of the Kuvâ-yi Milliyiye members who had left their homes. Some of the civil servants in the offices were left in their places. Those who were in favor of the Kuvâ-yi Milliye were expelled with the zeal of some pro-Greek Muslims. Giridîzâde Muhiddin Bey, the president of the Hürriyet ve Îtilâf Party, was appointed as the mayor. Those who were arrested and imprisoned in the first days of the occupation were released after a month and a half, after local Greeks and Armenians intervened and vouched for them, making them swear that they would never engage in politics again.

Some of the national detachments kept their weapons to protect their villages and retreated to the mountains in small groups. Greek troops landing in Bandırma were welcomed by local Greeks and some Anzavur soldiers. When the main army units were moved towards Balıkesir, Greek gendarmes and sailors, who were the crew of Greek ships, remained in Bandırma. Their first job was to find and arrest those who supported the national movement in the city and hang some of them. Circassian Hasan Bey, one of the pillars of the national movement in Bandirma, was insulted and killed in Harbor Square at the suggestion of the collaborators.

Some patriotic people in Balıkesir and the surrounding regions started to search for answers to the question of what to do against the occupation after the occupation confusion stopped. During these days, İbrahim Ethem Bey, who had fled to Ankara after the occupation while working as a lawyer in Balıkesir and was sent to Demirci by the National Government as a District Governor because he knew the region, refused to surrender after the Greeks occupied this place as well and retreated to Sındırgı mountains, taking the gendarmerie unit in the region and the groups of Parti Mehmet Pehlivan and Halil Efe with him.

Upon this news, the people of Balıkesir called the secret "Military Police", or "Ayın-Pe" organization to duty without being noticed by the Greeks. Ayın-Pe immediately became a strong solidarity unit. The villagers, who were left unprotected at the beginning of the occupation, were secretly arming themselves. Tevfik Bey, who was the District Director of İvrindi and known as Koca Müdür, went to the mountains of İvrindi to join the Efes. He organized them as a national detachment and became their leader. Tevfik Bey, who also called other Efes he had known during his time as the district director, formed a strong detachment. He was attached to İbrahim Ethem Bey in Sındırgı Mountains.

Armed forces in the region during the Greek Occupation

1) Greek regular troops

There was a strong garrison in Balıkesir, and mass units in Ayvalık, Bandirma, Edremit, Susurluk, and Sındırgı. In addition, Greek ships were anchored in Ayvalık, Bandırma and Erdek, and there were naval officers attached to them and a Greek coast guard organization established in these places.

2) Greek Gendarmes

Greek gendarmes, separate from Greek troops and partly mounted, had established outposts in villages close to them in all regions.

3) Local Greek gangs

Kirman of Yeniceli, Panayot of Dutliman, Istavri son of Andon Kâhya, Yani son of Nikola, Sofokli son of Yorgi, Dimitri son of Nikola, Istrati son of Papanikola, Yorgaki son of Andon of Peremeli, Yorgi son of Moscow of Elpisli, Petro son of Pandeli, Yordan son of Çavdar, Karaman son of Mihal, Tanaş son of Timurtaşlı, Istrati son of Tiraş, Istavri and Ligor Teodos are some of the local Greek gangs.

4) Greek bandits

Ibiş Gang in Uşak-Gediz region, Kabakçı and Toplu Saadettin gangs in Yenice-Emet-Tavşanlı region, Circassian Ilyas Gang in Gökçedağ, Zekeriya and Kör Ali Gang in Dursunbey (Balat), Cemil and Kamalı Circassian Ramazan Gang in Bigadiç, Circassian Sülüklü Davut and Circassian Canbazlı Hakkı gangs in Susurluk-Karacabey region, Anzavuroğlu Kadir and Boğazköy Kemâlettin gangs around Manyas, Güvemçetmili Ahmet Çavuş Gang between Bigadiç and Balıkesir, and Çetmi Bayram Gang (Çetmi Bayram was caught on the day of liberation, spit on by the people and hanged. ) They are known as Greek bandits.

5) Local Greek gangs (Greek militia and Greek scout organization)

Local Greek gangs were formed by Greek volunteers in Edremit, Ayvalık, Burhaniye, Zeytinli, Dikili, and Manyas.

6)Bandit (Çalıkakıcılar)

The bandits, also known colloquially as Çalıkakıcılar, were composed of deserters during World War I.

7) Bandits who redeemed themselves by joining the War of Independence

Küçük Hasan, İsmail Çavuş, Recep Pehlivan in Çatalca; Altıparmak Nuri, Yaşar, İbrahim Çavuş, Bosnian Kara İbrahim, Kürt Hasan, Bacak Hasan around Manyas-Gönen-Bandırma; Çetmi Süleyman, Tatar Mehmet Çavuş in Susurluk; Yağlılarlılı Salih in İvrindi; Ayşebacıılı Recep, Hâfız Hacı Ali of Pabuçcu, Rıfat and their gangs between Balıkesir-Kepsut.

8)Turkish Police and Gendarmerie

Despite the Greek occupation, the Turkish police and gendarmerie did not abandon their duties, but later these police, officers, and gendarmes were sent to Istanbul, and the gendarmes and police of Edremit, Bandirma, and Edincik were dismissed.

9) National detachments

Demirci District Governor İbrahim Ethem Bey formed a group whose forces sometimes reached 150 people.

According to this numbering, the 1st - 2nd - 3rd - 4th and 5th platoons were composed of infantry and cavalry gendarmerie soldiers from Demirci and Gördes regions. The 6th - 10th - 11th - 12th and 13th platoons were composed of Efes. The working areas and commanders of the detachments are as follows:

- 1st Platoon, the area between Bigadiç-Konakpınar, Commander Hüseyin Çavuş
- 2nd Platoon, Kula-Eşme region, Commander Kulalı Mehmet Efe
- 3rd Platoon, between Sındırgı-Akhisar, Commander Hacı Veli
- 4th Platoon, between Akhisar-Gelenbe, Commander Bakırlı Mustafa Efe (Saçlı Efe)
- 5th Platoon, between Kırkağaç-Soma, Commander Ahmet Çavuş from Bakırlı
- 6th Platoon, Dursunbey-Mustafakemalpaşa-Yenice region, Commander Arslan Aga from Balıkesirli
- 10th Platoon, the area between Kepsut and Balıkesir, Commander Ahmet Nazif of Kirmastili (later, Arab Ali Osman Efe)
- 11th Platoon, Simav and Demirci region, Commander Pehlivan Aga (Parti Mehmet Pehlivan)
- 12th Platoon, Gördes-Salihli region, Commander Halil Efe (After Halil Efe died, the soldiers of his platoon were distributed to other units).
- 13th Platoon, Sındırgı-Kınık-Porsunlar region, Commander Sarı Mehmet Efe

== Liberation ==
On July 31, 1922, Army instruction, which was brought to Ibrahim Ethem Bey by a fedayeen named Nurullah, codenamed Hüseyin, stated that "the national army would soon arrive and that the Greek adventure in Anatolia was over". The news caused great joy among all the detachments. At dawn on August 26, 1922, İbrahim Ethem Bey, who heard the sound of cannons coming deep into the Sındırgı mountains and waited for this signal, gave the good news to the villagers that the army was coming. On August 27, the sound of cannons continued. It was learned from the news that the enemy was preparing to flee.

On September 1 and 2, the detachments armed the participants and spent the day in pursuit of the fleeing enemy. On September 3, the detachments advancing towards Sındırgı encountered wire-mesh trenches dug by the enemy around the town. After two hours of fighting, the enemy retreated.

The detachments entered Sındırgı with great excitement, and after maintaining order and taking the necessary measures, they gathered the Greeks who could not escape from Sındırgı, put them naked and upside down on donkeys, wrote on them, "I am a traitor, I deserve this punishment, and paraded them around the bazaar."

On September 3, 1922, the detachments cutting the roads attacked the enemy group fleeing from Sındırgı at a place called Karayokuş near Bigadiç, and the enemy scattered.

On the night of September 4, the detachments attacking Bigadiç drove the enemy away, and Mülazım Kasım Efendi Detachment was sent to ambush the enemy in Çağış. The detachments entered Bigadiç with great cheering on September 5. The detachments of İbrahim Ethem Bey's group were divided into three columns in Sındırgı. One column advanced towards Balıkesir, one column towards Akhisar-Kırkağaç-Okçu, and one column towards Dursunbey-Kepsut and its surroundings. Kepsut was liberated on September 5, 1922.

On the morning of September 5, the reconnaissance columns of the national detachments reached the villages of Çayırhisar and Ayşebacı, and the roads of all the surrounding villages were cut. Greeks and Armenians fled to Bandirma by train. The Izmir railroad was also cut by Saçlı Efe.

On the morning of September 5, Greek soldiers were carrying and loading their belongings. On the night of September 4–5, fires were lit by the people on the hills overlooking Balıkesir. The Greeks who saw the fire lights like sand on the hills fled that night. The Greek Commander left the city with the last train.

On the night of September 5–6, Albanian Arslan Aga from Balıkesir entered Balıkesir with a reconnaissance column and delivered the good news that the city would be liberated in the morning. The city did not sleep all night. Every door was knocked one by one and it was reported that the city would be welcomed in the morning.

== Liberation of districts ==
After Sındırgı, the National Detachments were divided into three groups. One went in the direction of Kırkağaç-Soma, one in the direction of Bigadiç-Balıkesir, and the other in the direction of Dursunbey-Kepsut. Except for the coastal region, the enemy withdrew from the other regions and İbrahim Ethem Bey sent telegrams to the districts and asked the prominent people of these districts to form a defense-law committee, sent representatives to the necessary places and left the public order of the regions to the initiative of these committees.

The Kasım Efendi Detachment was sent to Balya. The area around Balya was completely surrounded by Turkish gangs, and the Greek troops, who wanted to use the only exit line, the "Dekovil Line", made an exit movement with Balya Greeks they put on the train. At the Balya Gorge, held by Soğanbüklü Bektaş Aga, Avşarlı Cafer Efe, Kırgöz İbrahim, and his friends, the Greeks faced fire and turned back. They fortified the train, set up a few machines in the trunks, and made a second breakthrough. After a very bloody battle, they were able to break through the blockade and reach the shore in a miserable state. The İvrindi Detachment, led by Koca Müdür Tevfik Bey, united with the Bakırlı Mustafa Efe Detachment in accordance with İbrahim Ethem Bey's orders and liberated Bergama. Immediately establishing positions in places overlooking Bergama, they prevented the Greek troops from entering Bergama. With the withdrawal of the enemy from İvrindi to Balya, İvrindi was liberated earlier.

Gönen Lightning Detachment raided the Greek troops in Gönen on the night of September 5–6. The Greeks, hiding behind wire fences, could only hold out until noon on September 6. A force of 700-800 Greek soldiers under the command of Major Drago was completely destroyed. After liberating Gönen, the Gönen Detachment raided and destroyed the Greek headquarters in Sarıköy District and Elbirlik Village on the same day.

The next day, the raid was expanded and the Greek garrison at Edincik was surrounded. During the fierce battles, Bacak Hasan Efe was seriously wounded. While the battles continued in this way, Sarı Efe Edip and Major Hacı Adil Bey arrived with their detachments from Bursa to expel the last remnants of the enemy in Bandırma and Erdek from Anatolia and destroyed the Greek garrison within two hours. The remnants of the disorganized enemy army were looking for a way to reach the coast. There were three important groups of them around Balıkesir. One group was trying to cross the mountains to retreat in the direction of Edremit; a group withdrawn from Bursa was trying to make its way to İzmir via Balıkesir; and another group was wandering in the Simav-Sındırgı region.

On September 5, an enemy unit in Porsunlar and Tına Meadow was spotted around Söğütcük Village at noon and destroyed in a short time.

On August 30, 1922, upon the final defeat of the Greek forces, non-Muslims in the vicinity of Bandirma, Erdek, Gönen, Manyas, and Karacabey were brought to the Greek ships in Erdek and British ships in Bandirma starting from September 1, 1922.

The Greeks started to fill the Muslims they found in a place surrounded by reeds and wire fences near the village of Mağmum in Bandirma. The Turks, who soon numbered three thousand, were brought to Bandırma on September 16 and stuffed into the Haydar Çavuş Mosque in the city center. Only armed Greek bouncers remained in Bandirma. At dusk, the Greek bouncers placed explosives around the mosque, detonated them, and fled. Some of the Turks in the mosque realized the situation and the mosque was immediately evacuated. Soon after, the mosque exploded and burned until morning, along with many houses in the neighborhood.

On September 17, the Turkish army, arriving near Bandirma and learning that there was no enemy left, headed towards Erdek via Paşabayırı. Turkish soldiers were ambushed by Greek rearguard forces in front of Akçapınar village and suffered many casualties. Regiment and battalion commanders were killed while trying to step forward and encourage the soldiers. The enemy did not wait any longer and fled in a short time. The next day, the Turkish forces continued their offensive and fought another battle with the Greeks on Albayrak Hill near Erdek. Unable to hold out any longer, the Greek forces, taking local Greeks and Armenians with them, boarded their ships in the harbor and left Anatolia.

The bullets fired here were the last bullets of the Turkish War of Independence.
