= Battle of Kovanbaşı =

Part of the Franco-Turkish War

- Part of the Franco-Turkish War
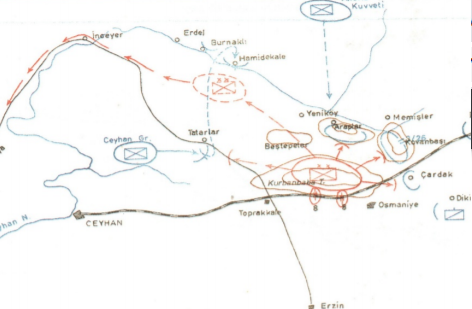
- Disposition of the French and Turkish forces during the battle.
Date	10–11 October 1920
Location	Osmaniye
Result	Turkish victory

Belligerents
National Forces	France: (Armenia) French Armenian Legion

Casualties and losses
Unknown	Unknown

The Battle of Kovanbaşı took place between Turkish National Forces and the French Third Republic during the Franco-Turkish War. The battle ended with a Turkish victory on 11 October 1920.

== Background ==
French interest in the region was sparked by the Sykes-Picot Agreement, signed amidst World War I.

== Battle ==
Battle of Kovanbaşı was the first one of 2 major battles in Osmaniye Province during the Franco-Turkish War. The battle started on 10 October when French artillery fired several fires against Turkish targets. As a response, Turkish troops marched to the French positions and French forces retreated. Then the French moved their troops in Düziçi to the battlefront in Kovanbaşı but were defeated again. After 8 hours of fighting, all French and Armenian troops in the region retreated to northern Ceyhan with heavy casualties.

== Aftermath ==
After the battle, Battle of Kanlı Geçit was fought in November and resulted in Turkish victory, forcing French to fully retreat from Osmaniye Province.
