= Akbaş =

Akbaş (literally "white head") is a Turkish name that may refer to:

== People ==
- Ferhat Akbaş (born 1986), Turkish volleyball coach and former volleyball player
- Fuat Akbaş (1900–?), Turkish wrestler
- Hatice Akbaş (born 2002), Turkish female boxer
- Hüseyin Akbaş (1933–1989), Turkish wrestler
- Semanur Akbaş (born 1996), Turkish women's footballer

== Places ==
- Akbaş, Balya, a village
- Akbaş, Bartın, a village in the district of Bartın, Bartın Province
- Akbaş, Bismil
- Akbaş, Çerkeş
- Akbaş, Gerede, a village in the district of Gerede, Bolu Province
- Akbaş, Güdül, a village in the district of Güdül, Ankara Province
- Akbaş, Honaz
- Akbaş, Serik, a village in the district of Serik, Antalya Province

== Other ==
- Akbaş arms depot raid, during the Turkish War of Independence
