= Raid on Erikli =

- Part of the Greco-Turkish War (1919–22)
| Date | 21–22 June 1919 |
| Location | Erikli (close to Erbeyli) |
| Result | Turkish victory |

Belligerents
| (Kingdom of Greece) Greece | Kuva-yi Milliye |

Strength
| 3 Evzones companies (700 men) | 40 men |

Casualties and losses
| 30 killed and 40 wounded | 7 killed and 10 wounded |

The raid on Erikli was performed by members of the Kuva-yi Milliye in the Greco-Turkish War. The Malgaç attack had shocked the Greeks, so the members of the Kuva-yi Milliye planned to perform another assault.

== Prelude ==
Erikli was located about 20 kilometres (12 mi) west of Aydın. In Erikli the Greeks had stationed two companies of an Evzones battalion. The Kuva-yi Milliye planned to lower the morale of the Greek troops by attacking them in Erikli and at the same time boost the resistance feelings of the Turkish population. Another aim was to force Greek troops to pull out of the vicinity of Aydın.

== Raid ==
The Turkish forces started their attack on the night of 21–22 June 1919. Supported by machine gun fire and the use of their own made hand bombs, they attacked under the cover of darkness. After a two-hour clash and inflicting high casualties on their enemy, the Turkish irregulars retreated back to their positions.

== Aftermath ==
The Greek units had suffered 30 killed and 40 wounded, while the Turks had seven killed and 10 wounded. Facing more high casualties, the rest of the Greek troops beat a hasty retreat out of Erikli. The raid was protested by the British intelligence officer in Aydın.

== Sources ==
- Oğuz Gülcan, BATI ANADOLU’DA KUVAYI MİLLİYENİN OLUŞUMU (1919–1920), Ankara Üniversitesi Türk İnkılap Tarihi Enstitüsü, 2007, page 254 (Ankara University Open Archive System). (in Turkish)
