= Battle of Fadıl =

Part of the Franco-Turkish War

- Part of the Franco-Turkish War
Date	20–24 November 1920
Location	Adana and Osmaniye
Result	Turkish victory

Belligerents
National Forces	France

Casualties and losses
Turkish claims: 25 killed, 40 wounded	

The Battle of Fadıl took place between Turkish National Forces and the French Third Republic during the Franco-Turkish War.

== Background ==
French interest in the region was sparked by the Sykes-Picot Agreement, signed amidst World War I.

== Battle ==
In October 1920, most of the Turkish forces in Çukurova were transferred to Konya due to civil disobedience in region. French intelligence leaked this information to French commanders in November 1920 and on 20 November 1920, French forces, who were equipped with modern weapons launched a military operation in Adana and Osmaniye. Even though the operation was successful at the start, with reinforcements from Konya arriving, National Forces managed to repel the French army.

== Casualties ==
Turkish claimed, there are 25 Turkish members of the National Forces died and 40 others were injured in the battle.
