= Battle of Kanlı Geçit =

Part of the Franco-Turkish War

- Part of the Franco-Turkish War
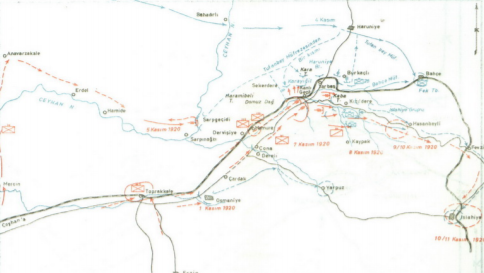
- Disposition of the French and Turkish forces during the battle.
Date	1 November 1920
Location	Kanlı Geçit ("Bloody Gateway")
Result	Turkish victory

Belligerents
National Forces	France

Commanders and leaders
Aşir Bey	Unknown

Strength
Turkish claims: 1,000 Kuva-yi Milliye militias	Unknown

The Battle of Kanlı Geçit took place between Turkish National Forces and the French Third Republic during the Franco-Turkish War in the Turkish War of Independence. The battle began on November 1, 1920, and ended with a Turkish victory on November 9. The exact number of casualties are unknown.

== Background ==
French interest in the region was sparked by the Sykes-Picot Agreement in World War I, which laid out the partition of the Turkish Empire after its expected demise. The agreement divided the Turkish provinces outside the Arabian Peninsula into areas of British and French control, divided by the Sykes–Picot line. The agreement effectively gave Britain control of Palestine, Jordan, and Iraq, and additional small areas, and France got control of southeastern Turkey, Syria and Lebanon.

== Battle ==
By November 1, 1920 various forces were scattered in national detachments within the town of Osmaniye. In the early hours of the morning, a large part of the French force advanced to Mamure railway station without encountering any resistance from the 1000 Kuva-yi Milliye militia fighters. French forces advancing in the direction of "the bell" met with resistance but continued to advance towards Kanlı Geçit, also referred to as "the Bloody Gateway." By noon, all French forces had reached the Blood Alley-Mamure railway line. Turkish forces from Osmaniye were able to retreat to Yarpuz, 20 km away. Turkish Forces from Ceyhan retreated to the northern bank of the Ceyhan River with a portion of the platoon beginning to move towards Kadirli.

French forces north of the Ceyhan Rivers and east of the starting offensive received intense fire from Turkish forces. Firing continued against French forces east of the Ceyhan River, resulting in heavy casualties. As a result French forces there were repelled.

== After the Battle ==
The next day, French forces continuing to collect at "Blood Alley-Mamure", while Turkish troops consolidated at the "Blood Alley zone", along with 500 Kadirli platoon commanded by "Aydınoğlu Mr. Flood". Attacks ceased until the morning of November 8, when the French began to fire on Turkish forces. Turkish forces were also attacked by French aircraft passing overhead. During this early morning attack, the French captured the high positions of the Turkish forces, but by evening these positions were taken back. During this attack the French managed to occupy a hill, where they spent the night.

The following morning, November 9, the French began an extensive and intense offensive against the Turkish Forces in Kabaktepe. This continued until the evening. At 12:00am on November 10, French forces in Kabaktepe were seized and their captured territory had been reduced to "Islahiye Hasanbeyli, Square-i Ekbez" and "Gaziantep-Kilis."
