= Akbaş arms depot raid =

Coordinates: 40°11′02″N 26°21′23″E

- Part of the Turkish War of Independence
Date	26–27 January 1920
Location	Near Eceabat, Adrianople Vilayet
Result	Victory of the Movement

Belligerents
France; United Kingdom; Ottoman Empire	Kuva-yi Milliye

Commanders and leaders
(United Kingdom of Great Britain and Ireland) George Milne	Köprülü Hamdi Bey; Dramalı Rıza Bey

Strength
Garrison: 3 Ottoman and 6 French soldiers 200 British soldiers	30 men

Casualties and losses
9 soldiers captured (later released)	None

The Akbaş arms depot raid was one of the actions of the Kuva-yi Milliye during the Turkish War of Independence. Led by the militia leader Köprülü Hamdi Bey and Dramalı Rıza Bey, the raid was conducted on the night of 26–27 January 1920.

== Background ==
Born in 1886 or 1888 in Köprülü (now Veles), Macedonia, Köprülü Hamdi Bey served as an officer in the First Balkan War and was a Kaymakam during the First World War. After the Armistice of Mudros and the consequent Allied invasion of the Ottoman territories, Köprülü Hamdi Bey started to organize resistance movements in the Asian part of the Marmara Region. Dramalı Rıza Bey, born in 1890 in Drama, was also active in organizing the resistance in the same area with his friend Köprülü Hamdi Bey.

The Akbaş arms depot was located at the Akbaş bay close to Eceabat. It housed 8,000 rifles, 40 machine guns and 20,000 cases of ammunition. These were captured by the Ottoman Army on the Caucasus Front from the Russian Army, after the Russian Revolution. The weapons and ammunition were brought to the Akbaş depot and after the Ottoman surrender at the end of the First World War, the French troops took control of the depot. The British were planning to send these arms and ammunition to the White Army in Russia. Köprülü Hamdi Bey and Dramalı Rıza Bey, trying to preempt this, planned a raid against the depot. In case the raid would result in a success, the weapons would be used by the Kuva-yi Milliye. The mission was dangerous, because Allied ships were patrolling the Dardanelles and local Greeks were reporting every suspicious circumstance to the Allies. In order to gain information about the depot, the surroundings and the defence measurements, Köprülü Hamdi Bey ordered his friend Dramalı Rıza Bey, dressed as a local villager, to travel to the area and to gather information. Dramalı Rıza Bey managed to gather significant information about the arms depot, he even managed to enter the depot disguised as a local egg and fruit vendor. Returning with useful information, Hamdi Bey and Rıza Bey started to plan the raid.

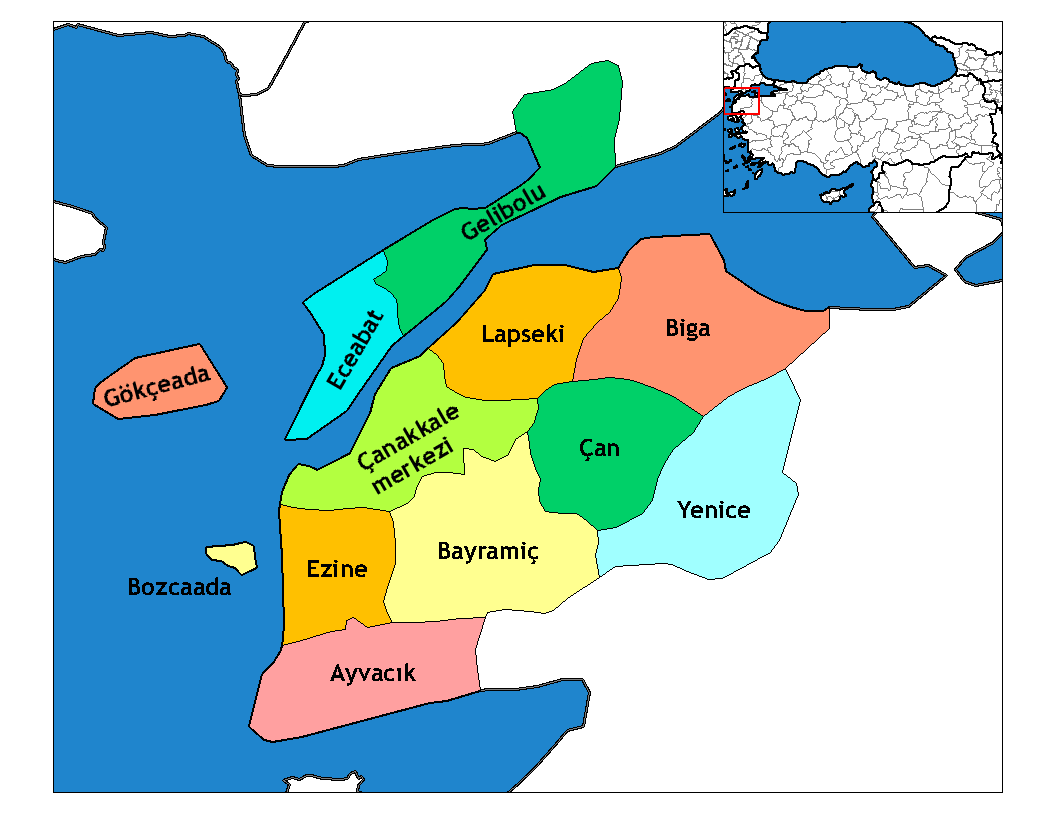
The Akbaş arms depot was located near Eceabat.

== The Raid ==
On the night of 26–27 January, Dramalı Rıza Bey along with 30 Turkish militias on barges and small boats crossed the Dardanelles from the Asian side. On arrival on the European side, some men were ordered to cut off the telephone lines. Most of soldiers of the depot garrison were sleeping. Therefore, the whole garrison was quickly overwhelmed and taken prisoner without any casualties. The weapons and ammunition were rapidly loaded on the barges and boats. Köprülü Hamdi Bey was waiting in the steamboat, Bolayır, at Bergos, his task was to pull the barges and boats back to the Asian side. By setting up a small fire, Hamdi Bey was given the signal to come to the Akbaş bay. Once the barges and boats were pulled to the Asian side, the arms and ammunition were transported to the interior areas. The captured Ottoman (Artillerymen: Major Bahri Bey, Mülazım Hulusi and Osman who were under the command of the French) and French soldiers were later released and sent back to the depot on a small boat.

== Aftermath ==
On 28 January a telegraph was sent to Mustafa Kemal Pasha, informing him about the successful raid. He congratulated them in a telegraph sent on 29 January. The Allies, informed of the raid, protested it to the Ottoman government in Constantinople. On 1 February, the British dispatched 200 men to Bandırma to search for the raiders and weapons. Furthermore, the Allies strengthened their guards of several depots in the area. In Constantinople, people who were suspected to support the Kuva-yi Milliye, were put under tighter observation. The British arrested several officers and officials in Constantinople.

Ahmet Anzavur was sent into the area, by the British, to capture Köprülü Hamdi Bey and his friends. Ahmet Anzavur was against the Turkish revolutionaries and had revolted previously against the Turkish National Movement. In his opinion, the arms and ammunition from the Akbaş depot would be useful for his men and a new revolt. On February 16, he found out that Hamdi Bey was residing in Biga, subsequently he surrounded the town with 1,000 men. After a brief clash, he captured Köprülü Hamdi Bey and several friends who were accompanying him. Anzavur's men tortured them before they killed them on 17 February. Anzavur and his men continued to advance. Eventually, they reached Yeniceköy, the town where the arms and ammunition from Akbaş were stored. Dramalı Rıza Bey, having no other choice, destroyed the weapons and ammunition by setting them on fire on 21 February. Conscience-stricken by the death of his friends and the decision to destroy the arms and ammunition, which were acquired after so much hard work, he planned to assassinate Damad Ferid Pasha. Dramalı Rıza Bey, believing that Damad Ferid Pasha was the mastermind behind Anzavur's attack, travelled to Constantinople to assassinate him. But he was arrested by the police in Constantinople and sentenced to death by hanging. He was executed on 12 June 1920.
