= Malgaç Raid =

Coordinates: 37°53′23″N 28°09′27″E

- Part of the Greco-Turkish War (1919–22)
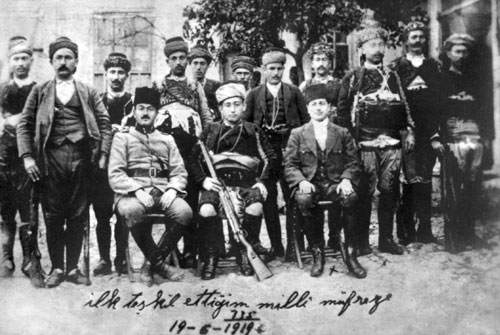
- Yörük Ali Efe (sitting centered) with his friends (19 June 1919)
Date	15–16 June 1919
Location	1–2 kilometre east of Sultanhisar
Result	Turkish victory: Bridge and its guard station destroyed.; Capture of some Greek weapons and ammunition

Belligerents
(Kingdom of Greece) Greece	Kuva-yi Milliye

Commanders and leaders
(Kingdom of Greece) Captain Yorgiyes	Yörük Ali Efe; Kıllıoğlu Hüseyin Efe; Captain Ahmet Bey; Asaf Necmi

Strength
20 at the bridge Reinforcements: 1 battalion	60 men

Casualties and losses
20+ killed	1 wounded

The Malgaç Raid was a raid conducted by Yörük Ali Efe and his men on 16 June 1919. The target of the raid was the Malgaç railway bridge, which was used by the Greeks to transport military equipment to Nazilli and beyond. It was one of the first organized civil resistance attacks against the invading Greek forces in western Anatolia.

== Prelude ==
The bridge was part of the İzmir–Aydın railway, which was the first railway built in the Ottoman Empire. The Malgaç bridge was located between Sultanhisar and Atça, built above the Malgaç stream.

== Raid ==
The bridge was guarded by 20 heavily armed Greek soldiers, supported with machine guns. In the night of 15–16 June, the Turks advanced from Donduran and crossed the Büyük Menderes River with rafts at 02:00 am. During the crossing they were divided into two groups, each group contained 30 men. When they finally reached the Malgaç bridge, they surrounded it by advancing in the cornfields. Simultaneously, some of the men climbed on the telephone poles and cut off the phone lines to prevent the calling of Greek reinforcements. They attacked the bridge from three sides, surprising the Greek guards and killing all of them. The bridge was destroyed by placing dynamite at the bridge piers. Woken up by the explosion and loud gunfire, Greek soldiers from the nearby headquarter tried to reach for help but they were hold off. After inflicting some casualties on the reinforcements, the Turkish forces retreated. The attack lasted several hours and the Greek troops had suffered over 20 killed and the Turks had only one wounded.

== Result ==
The Turks had captured some weapons and ammunition. As a result of the destruction of the bridge and the railway, the invading Greek forces could not use the railway to transport equipment on the Aydın-Nazilli route for a considerable time.

== Sources ==
- YORUK ALI EFE AND MALGAC SURPRISE ATTACK Sultanhisar Municipality
- Çine Kuvayı Milliye Müzesi, Yaşar Aksoy, 06.07.2008 (Article about the Malgaç Raid)
- Malgaç Baskını'nın 93. Yıldönümü (93rd anniversary of the Malgaç Raid) haberler.com
