= Kuva-yi Milliye =

Irregular armed forces during the Turkish War of Independence

Kuvâ-yi Milliye
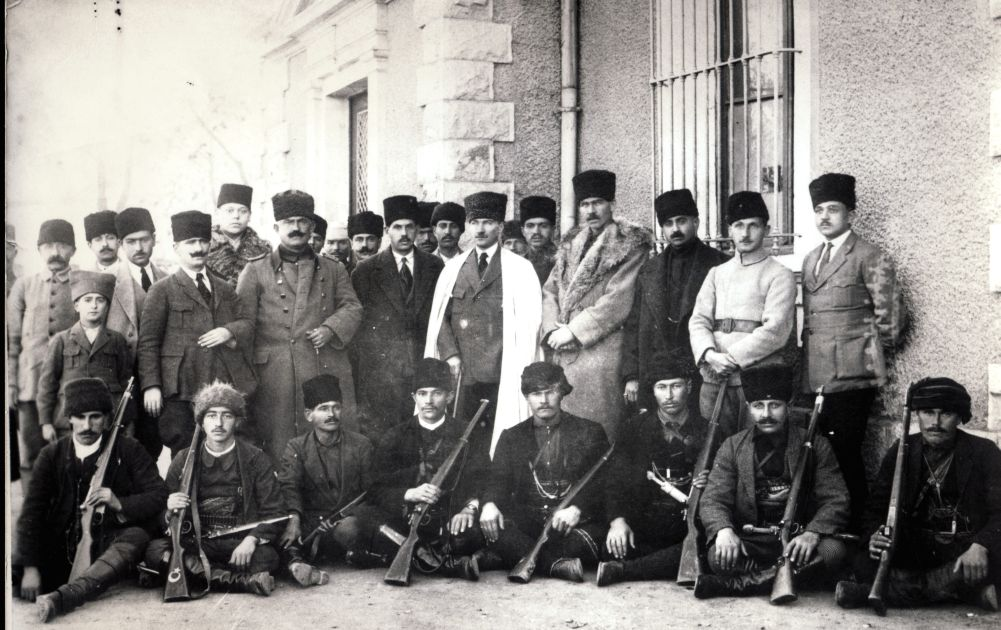
- Ethem the Circassian, his Circassian men (Kuva-yi Seyyare) and Mustafa Kemal Pasha in front of the main building of the station, who were on their way to the Yozgat rebellion (June 1920)
- Active: 1918–1921
- Country: Ottoman Empire
- Allegiance: Grand National Assembly (until 27 December 1920)
- Type: Militia
- Role: Turkish Independence
- Size: 5,000 (1919); 15,000 (peak in 1920)
- Mottos: Ya istiklâl ya ölüm! (Either independence or death!)
- Colors: Red and White
- Engagements: Turkish War of Independence: Franco-Turkish War; Revolts during the Turkish War of Independence; Greco-Turkish War (until 1921)

Commanders
- Notable commanders: Mustafa Kemal Pasha (commander-in-chief); Ethem the Circassian (Main commander until 1921); Yörük Ali Efe (Commander, Western Front); Şahin Bey (Commander, Southern Front); Topal Osman (Commander)

The Kuva-yi Milliye (Ottoman Turkish: قواى مليه; lit. 'National Forces' or 'Nationalist Forces') were irregular Turkish militia forces active in the early period of the Turkish War of Independence. Composed mainly of bandits, gangsters and other criminals, they emerged after the occupation of the parts of Turkey by the Allied forces in accordance with the Armistice of Mudros. Later, Kuva-yi Milliye were integrated to the regular army (Kuva-yi Nizamiye) of the Grand National Assembly. Some historians call this period (1918–20) of the Turkish War of Independence the "Kuva-yi Milliye phase".

== History ==
In the Armistice of Mudros, Ottoman Empire was divided between the Allies, where the Greeks occupied the west, the British occupied the capital and southeast, and the Italians and the French occupied the south of the country.

When the atrocities committed by the Greeks in the places they occupied became known among the people of Afyonkarahisar, the people began to harbor great hatred and anger against the Greeks. Realizing that the danger caused by the Greeks could harm them in a short time, the people of Afyonkarahisar, under the leadership of Lieutenant Colonel Arif Bey, formed the Afyonkarahisar Kuvâ-yi Milliye.

The Kuva-yi Milliye were the first armed groups to defend the Turks and Muslims' rights in Anatolia and Rumelia. The Kuva-yi Milliye consisted of deserted Ottoman army officers and militias. The Kuva-yi Milliye became active when the Greeks landed at Smyrna (İzmir). People who opposed the partitioning of Anatolia by the unratified Treaty of Sèvres joined the resistance. The Franco-Turkish War was almost exclusively conducted by Kuva-yi Milliye units on the Turkish side. In western Anatolia, the Kuva-yi Milliye fought against the Greek Army by hit-and-run tactics until a regular army was set up. The resistance of the Kuva-yi Milliye slowed the Greek advance in Anatolia.

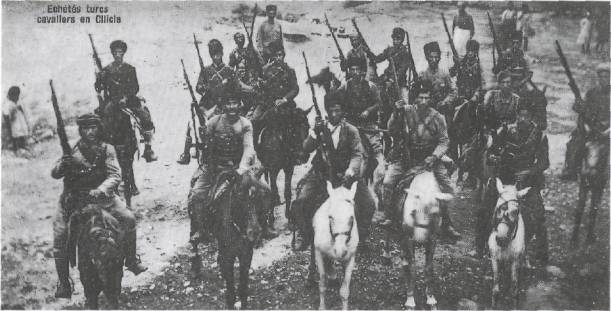
Kuva-yi Milliye militias. The original image was dated from 1919.

== Dissolution of Kuva-yi Milliye ==
Although the Kuva-yi Milliye was regarded as the first step of resistance in the liberation of Turkey, irregular warfare was abandoned later on. The militia lacked discipline and experience; it had no chance in larger open field battles against the Greeks. In September 1920, its members had to face and halt the advance of a highly trained and well equipped Greek Army numbering more than 107,000 men with a force less than 15,000 on the Western front. After the Grand National Assembly of Turkey was opened, the regular army was created by merging different Kuva-yi Milliye groups. Kuva-yi Milliye was ultimately dissolved towards the end of 1920. Although some units of the Kuva-yi Milliye still fought on the southern front until 1921. The First Battle of İnönü is the first in which the standing army fought against the Greek forces.

== Rebels ==
Some Kuva-yi Milliye groups, most notably Çerkes Ethem's Kuva-yi Seyyare refused to disband his forces and mutinied against the Ankara Government. The Army of GNA defeated both the Greek Army and the Rebel Forces at the end of Turkish War of Independence.

== See also ==
- Kuva-yi Inzibatiye
