= Italian cruiser Agordat =

Torpedo cruiser of the Italian Royal Navy

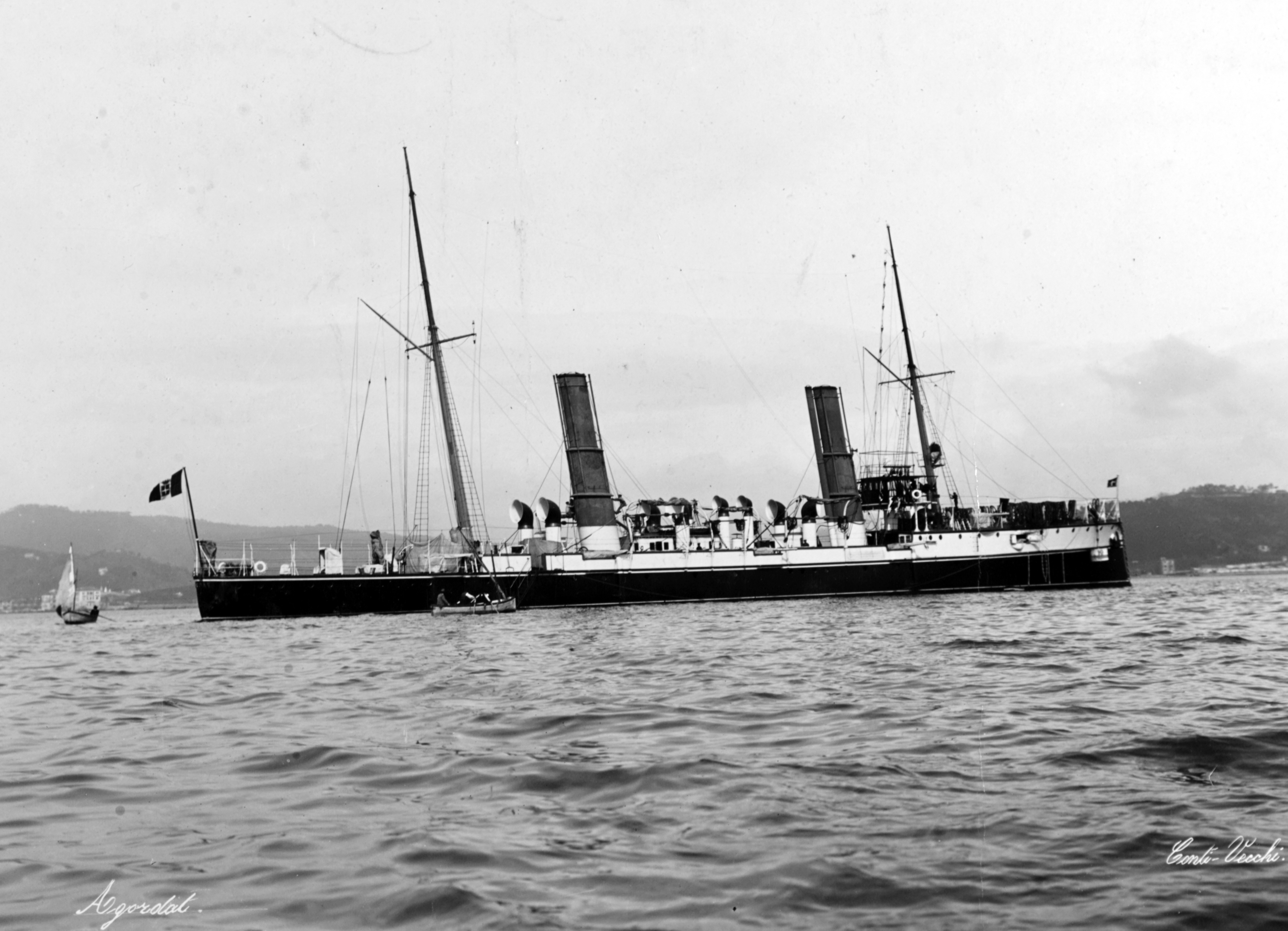
- Agordat circa 1900

History

Italy
- Name: Agordat
- Namesake: City of Agordat
- Builder: Regio Cantiere di Castellammare di Stabia
- Laid down: 18 February 1897
- Launched: 11 October 1899
- Commissioned: 29 September 1900
- Fate: Sold for scrapping, 4 January 1923

General characteristics
- Class & type: Agordat-class torpedo cruiser
- Displacement: Full load: 1,340 long tons (1,360 t)
- Length: 91.6 m (300 ft 6 in)
- Beam: 9.32 m (30 ft 7 in)
- Draft: 3.64 m (11 ft 11 in)
- Installed power: 8 × Blechynden boilers; 8,129 indicated horsepower (6,062 kW)
- Propulsion: 2 × triple-expansion steam engines; 2 × screw propellers
- Speed: 22 knots (41 km/h; 25 mph)
- Range: 300 nmi (560 km; 350 mi) at 10 knots (19 km/h; 12 mph)
- Complement: 153–185
- Armament: 12 × 76 mm (3 in) guns; 2 × 450 mm (17.7 in) torpedo tubes
- Armor: Deck: 20 mm (0.79 in)

Agordat was a torpedo cruiser of the Italian Regia Marina (Royal Navy) built in the late 1890s. She was the lead ship of the Agordat class, which had one other member, Coatit. The ship, which was armed with twelve 76 mm (3 in) guns and two 450 mm (17.7 in) torpedo tubes, was too slow and short-ranged to be able to scout effectively for the fleet, so her career was limited. She saw action during the Italo-Turkish War in 1911–1912, where she provided gunfire support to Italian troops in North Africa. She assisted in the occupation of Constantinople in the aftermath of World War I, and in 1919 she was reclassified as a gunboat. In January 1923, Agordat was sold for scrapping.

== Design ==
Plan and profile drawing of the Agordat class

Through the 1880s and 1890s, the Italian Regia Marina (Royal Navy) had built a series of torpedo cruisers in a brief experiment with the doctrine of the Jeune École under the direction of Benedetto Brin. The Jeune École theory argued that small, cheap torpedo-armed vessels would replace the large and expensive ironclad warships that had dominated naval doctrine since the 1860s. The two Agordat-class cruisers were the culmination of this line of development. By the time of their construction, the Jeune École was no longer in vogue, and so they were intended to serve as scouts for Italy's fleet of pre-dreadnought battleships.

Agordat was 91.6 meters (300 ft 6 in) long overall and had a beam of 9.32 m (30 ft 7 in) and a draft of 3.64 m (11 ft 11 in). She displaced up to 1,340 long tons (1,360 t) at full load. The ship had a raised forecastle deck that extended for the first third of the hull, after which it stepped down to the main deck. Agordat had a fairly minimal superstructure, consisting primarily of a small conning tower. She was fitted with two pole masts. She had a crew of between 153 and 185 that varied over the course of her career.

Her propulsion system consisted of a pair of horizontal triple-expansion steam engines each driving a single screw propeller. Steam was supplied by eight Blechynden water-tube boilers, which were ducted into two widely spaced funnels. Her engines were rated at 8,129 indicated horsepower (6,062 kW) and produced a top speed of 22 knots (41 km/h; 25 mph). The ship had a cruising radius of about 300 nautical miles (560 km; 350 mi) at a more economical speed of 10 knots (19 km/h; 12 mph).

Agordat was armed with a main battery of twelve 76 mm (3 in) L/40 guns mounted singly. Two guns were placed side-by-side on the forecastle, two were placed in casemates in the forecastle, another pair were placed aft, and the remaining six were distributed along the broadside. She was also equipped with two 450 mm (17.7 in) torpedo tubes. The ship was only lightly armored with a 20 mm (0.79 in) thick deck, which angled downward at the sides to provide a measure of protection against light gunfire.

== Service history ==
Agordat was built at the Castellammare shipyard; her keel was laid down on 18 February 1897 and her completed hull was launched on 11 October 1899. After completing fitting-out work, the new cruiser was commissioned into the Italian fleet on 26 September 1900. Sea trials lasted from 11 February 1901 to 6 March, and during the final speed trial she exceeded her design speed by a knot. She nevertheless proved to be too slow and short-legged to be useful as a fleet scout, which limited her active duty career. She served in the main fleet in 1902–1904, during which time the fleet was kept in a state of readiness for seven months. For the remaining five months, the ships had reduced crews. In 1903, the unit also included eight battleships, six other cruisers, and six destroyers. By the 1904–1905 training year, the main squadron was reduced in size, with the two oldest battleships having been withdrawn, though three destroyers were added. During the 1908 fleet maneuvers, Agordat was assigned to the hostile force that was tasked with simulating an attempt to land troops on Sicily.

=== Italo-Turkish War ===
At the outbreak of the Italo-Turkish War against the Ottoman Empire in September 1911, Agordat was assigned to the 2nd Division of the 1st Squadron, under the command of Rear Admiral Ernesto Presbitero, the divisional commander. On 15 October, Agordat and her sister joined the battleship Napoli, the armored cruisers Pisa, Amalfi, and San Marco, three destroyers, and several troop transports for an attack on the port of Derna. Negotiators were sent ashore to attempt to secure the surrender of the garrison, which was refused. Napoli and the armored cruisers bombarded the Ottoman positions throughout the day, and on 18 October the Ottomans withdrew, allowing the Italian troops to come ashore and take possession of the port. The fleet remained offshore and helped to repel Ottoman counterattacks over the following two weeks. Agordat and San Marco supported a raid against Ottoman positions at the oases at Al-Kuwayfiya on 28 November, which resulted in an inconclusive action and a withdrawal to Benghazi. In December, Agordat and San Marco were joined by the battleships Roma and Regina Margherita at Benghazi. There, they provided gunfire support to the Italian garrison against repeated Turkish assaults.

Agordat intercepted the French mail steamer SS Carthage on 16 January 1912, which was carrying an aircraft and a pilot named Emile Duval; the Italians correctly suspected Duval had been hired by the Ottoman government and was headed to Tripoli to support Ottoman forces. Agordat accordingly ordered Carthage to follow her to Cagliari, Sardinia, where Duval and his aircraft were to be disembarked. Two days later, Agordat stopped the French steamer SS Manouba, which had Ottoman citizens aboard and was likewise escorted to Cagliari. The seizures caused a minor diplomatic incident between Italy and France, but the dispute was resolved after the Ottomans were disembarked from Manouba and Duval was permitted to remain aboard Carthage with his aircraft, which was delivered to Tunis, French Tunisia. In early April, Agordat, the torpedo cruiser Iride, and several other vessels rendezvoused with a troop convoy carrying 10,000 men to Zuwarah near the border with Tunisia.

=== World War I and fate ===
By 1914, Agordat was assigned to the 2nd Division of the 2nd Squadron; the squadron consisted of two divisions of armored cruisers, each supported by a scout cruiser. Italy, a member of the Central Powers, declared neutrality at the start of World War I in August 1914, but by May 1915, the Triple Entente had convinced the Italians to enter the war against their former allies. Admiral Paolo Thaon di Revel, the Italian naval chief of staff, believed that Austro-Hungarian submarines could operate too effectively in the narrow waters of the Adriatic, which could also be easily seeded with minefields. The threat from these underwater weapons was too serious for him to use the fleet in an active way. Instead, Revel decided to implement a blockade at the relatively safer southern end of the Adriatic with the main fleet, while smaller vessels, such as the MAS boats, conducted raids on Austro-Hungarian ships and installations.

In November 1918, Agordat participated in the occupation of Constantinople following the surrender of the Ottoman Empire. She and the battleship Roma joined a fleet of British, French, and Greek warships that entered the Dardanelles and landed troops to occupy the city. In 1921, Agordat was reclassified as a gunboat and her armament was modified; four of the 76 mm guns were replaced by a pair of 120 mm (4.7 in) L/40 guns and the torpedo tubes were removed. This service lasted less than two years, and on 4 January 1923 the ship was sold for scrapping.
