= Şehzadebaşı raid =

- Part of occupation of Constantinople
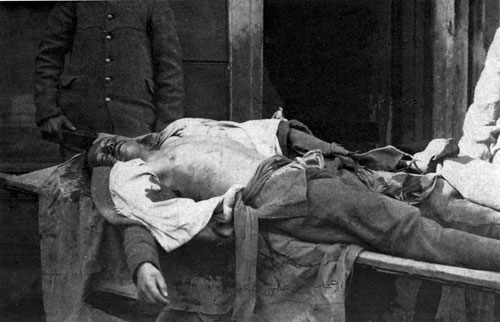
- Photograph of an Ottoman soldier killed during the raid
Date	16 March 1920
Location	Constantinople, Ottoman Empire
Result	British victory

Belligerents
British Empire; British Raj	Ottoman Empire

Strength
50–60	61

Casualties and losses
None	5 killed 10 wounded 1 missing 55 captured

The Şehzadebaşı raid was a British Indian Army operation to capture an Ottoman Army barracks in Constantinople which took place as part of a larger operation by the Allied occupational authorities to counter the Turkish National Movement. Since Allied forces had begun the occupation of Constantinople in November 1918 in accordance with the Armistice of Mudros, Turkish resistance to the occupation was gradually increasing. On 16 March 1920, the Allies launched a raid which arrested several nationalist politicians and journalists along with occupying military and police installations and government buildings.

Around 05:45, a lorry of British Indian Army troops serving as part of the occupation force arrived near the barracks, which was garrisoned by 61 Ottoman soldiers from the 10th Infantry Division. Two Ottoman soldiers stationed at the entrance began to resist the occupation by force of arms, leading to a shootout where the British Indian Army captured the barracks. Five Ottoman soldiers were killed, 10 were wounded and 1 went missing, while the British suffered no casualties.

== Background ==
The Allies of World War I began an occupation of Constantinople in November 1918 in accordance with the Armistice of Mudros. The first Allied troops to enter Constantinople was a French Army brigade which entered the city on November 12; British forces began entering the city the following day. Once they had occupied Constantinople, the Allies established a military administration to govern the city. The General Assembly of the Ottoman Empire continued to function, though they refused to recognise the occupation as legitimate, a fact which was ignored by the Allied occupational authorities.

As they were negotiating the partition of the Ottoman Empire, the Allies were growing increasingly concerned about the Turkish National Movement. To this end, the Allied occupational authorities in Constantinople began planning a raid to arrest nationalist politicians and journalists along with occupying military and police installations and government buildings. On 16 March 1920, the raid was carried out; several Royal Navy warships were anchored in the Galata Bridge to support British forces while they carried out the arrests and occupied several government buildings in the early hours of the morning.

== Raid ==
As part of the raid, two lorries of British Indian Army troops were dispatched to occupy an Ottoman Army barracks occupied by 61 soldiers from the 10th Infantry Division in Şehzadebaşı. The lorries arrived near the barracks around 05:45, with the soldiers from one lorry parking on a street and inspecting all passers-by while the other parked in front of the barracks.

As a group of 50 to 60 British Indian Army troops began to advance on the barracks, two soldiers stationed at the entrance began to resist the occupation by force of arms, leading to a shootout where one Ottoman soldier was wounded before both were captured. The British Indian Army proceeded to storm the barracks, capturing all the soldiers and weapons inside. 4 Ottoman soldiers were killed in the ensuing shootout while 9 were wounded and 1 went missing (one of the Ottoman wounded later died from his injuries). No casualties were reported on the British side.

== Aftermath ==
The overall raid culminated with the dissolution of the Ottoman Parliament. However, the Allied occupation continued to become increasingly unstable, particularly in the face of increasing resistance from the Turkish National Movement. In September 1922, the Chanak Crisis broke out as the government of the United Kingdom requested support from its colonies for a potential all-out war with the Government of the Grand National Assembly. However, Canada refused to support Britain and British Prime Minister David Lloyd George resigned. On 4 October 1923, the British, along with the French, Italians and Greeks left the city, concluding the occupation of Constantinople.

Though memory of the raid gradually receded in the following decades, it was revived via commemoration efforts initiated by the government of Turkey in the 21st century. As noted by Turkish historian Ayhan Kaya, these efforts were part of an effort by the Turkish state to commemorate both the Turkish War of Independence and the Gallipoli campaign, which "added new color to the ethnocentric and nationalist texture of everyday life in modern Turkey."

== See also ==
- Second Constitutional Era
