= Conference of London (1920) =

British-French-Italian meeting on the partition of the Ottoman Empire

In the Conference of London (12 February – 10 April 1920), following World War I, leaders of Britain, France, and Italy met to discuss the partitioning of the Ottoman Empire and the negotiation of agreements that would become the Treaty of Sèvres. Under the leadership of British Prime Minister David Lloyd George, Prime Minister of France Alexandre Millerand, and Prime Minister of Italy Francesco Saverio Nitti, the allied powers reached agreements that would form the basis of their arguments at the San Remo conference.

== Military administration of Constantinople ==
After the armistice of Mudros, the allies' military administration was established in Constantinople on 13 November 1918, but at that time they did not dismantle the Ottoman government or the Ottoman Sultan. The control of the Ottoman Empire was the main point of discussions during the conference. Most of the discussions were based on how to restrict the power of the Ottoman Sultan (see Ottoman Caliphate) and how to keep him in Constantinople, literally and politically, including the size of the Sultan's army and the sharing of the Dardanelles straits.

A balance was sought to allow the Sultan to control the security of the Caliphate, but not to enable him to change the course of the peace settlements. The members were constantly informed about the Khilafat Movement which tried to protect the position of caliphate.

However, the new Ottoman parliament deputies elected after the armistice met on 28 January 1920 and published their decisions of independence (Misak-ı Milli (National Oath)) on 12 February 1920. The Khilafat Movement try to influence the British government and protect the caliphate of the Ottoman Empire and although mainly a Muslim religious movement, the Khilafat struggle became a part of the wider Indian independence movement. For Britain's part, it would seek to preserve the Caliphate, likely to utilize it as a socio-political instrument in their rule over many of the world's Muslim lands. The Conference of London decided to take actions, at least on Turkish national movement, and decided to shift from "de facto" occupation of the Constantinople to "de jure" occupation of Constantinople.

== See also ==
- San Remo conference
- Conference of London of 1921–1922
- Occupation of Constantinople
