= Agordat-class cruiser =

Torpedo cruiser class of the Italian Royal Navy

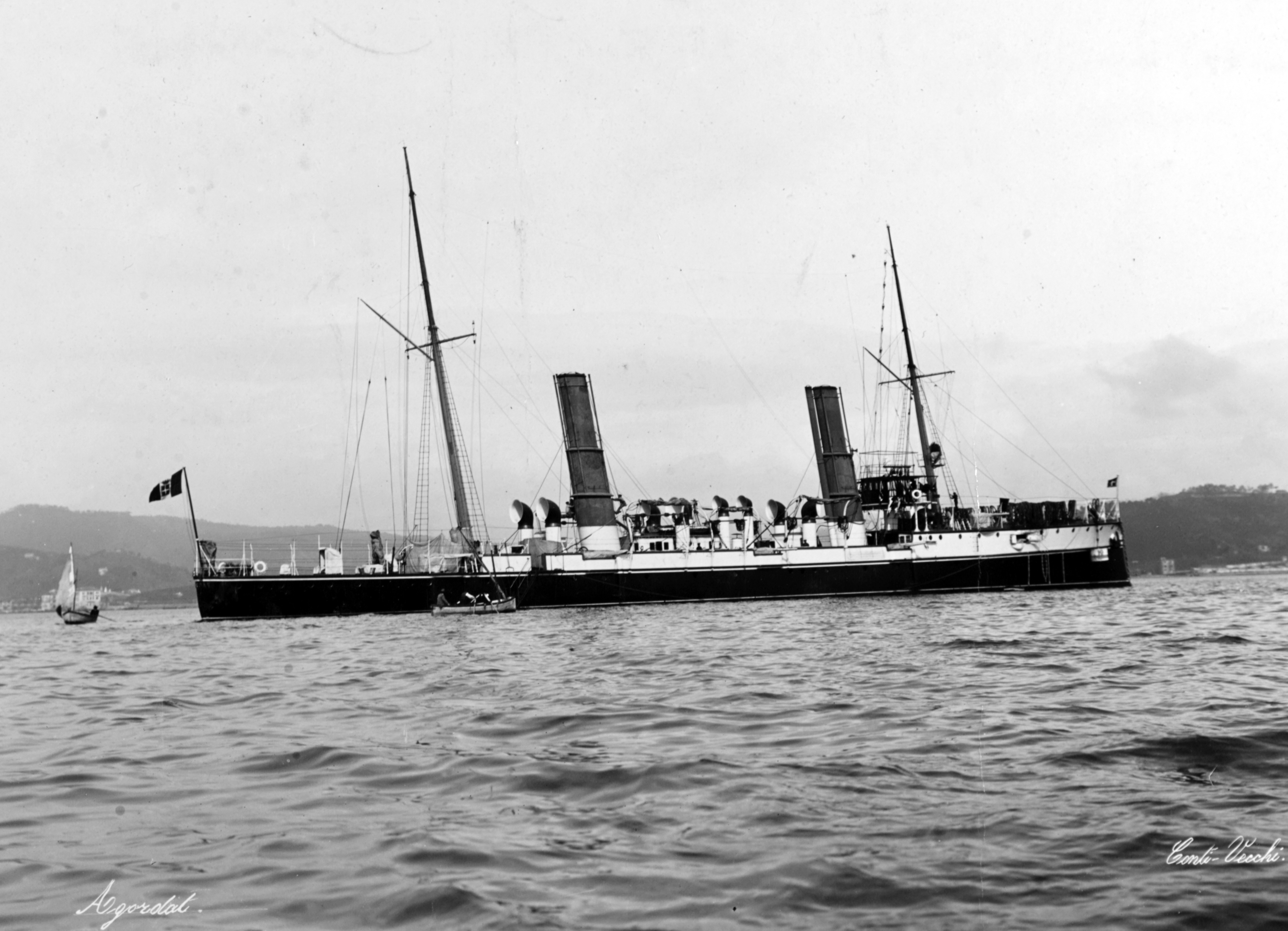
- Agordat circa 1900

Class overview
- Name: Agordat class
- Operators: Regia Marina
- Preceded by: Partenope class
- Succeeded by: None
- Built: 1897–1900
- In commission: 1900–1923
- Completed: 2
- Scrapped: 2

General characteristics
- Type: Torpedo cruiser
- Displacement: Full load: 1,292 to 1,340 long tons (1,313 to 1,362 t)
- Length: 91.6 m (300 ft 6 in)
- Beam: 9.32 m (30 ft 7 in)
- Draft: 3.54 to 3.64 m (11 ft 7 in to 11 ft 11 in)
- Installed power: 8 × Blechynden boilers; 8,129 to 8,215 ihp (6,062 to 6,126 kW)
- Propulsion: 2 × triple-expansion steam engines; 2 × screw propellers
- Speed: 22 to 23 knots (41 to 43 km/h; 25 to 26 mph)
- Range: 300 nmi (560 km; 350 mi) at 10 knots (19 km/h; 12 mph)
- Complement: 153–185
- Armament: 12 × 76 mm (3 in) guns; 2 × 450 mm (17.7 in) torpedo tubes
- Armor: Deck: 20 mm (0.79 in)

The Agordat class was a pair of torpedo cruisers built by the Italian Regia Marina (Royal Navy) in the late 1890s. The two ships, Agordat and Coatit, were armed with twelve 76 mm (3 in) guns and two 450 mm (17.7 in) torpedo tubes. They proved to be too slow and have too short a cruising radius to be of much use, so their service careers were limited. Their most significant action came during the Italo-Turkish War of 1911–1912, where both ships were employed in shore bombardment duties. Neither ship saw action in World War I. Coatit was converted into a minelayer in 1919 and sold for scrapping the following year, while Agordat was rearmed as a gunboat in 1921; she followed her sister to the breakers in 1923.

== Design ==
The design for the Agordat class was prepared by Engineering Director Nabor Soliani, who intended to build a pair of ships that could be used as fleet scouts. The new vessels were broadly similar to the previous Partenope class, but they were significantly larger, having a displacement around fifty percent greater than the earlier ships. Soliani also discarded the medium-caliber guns adopted in the Partenope-class ships, reducing the gun battery to light 76-millimeter (3 in) guns. The ships proved to be slow and short-ranged in service. They were only marginally faster than the contemporary pre-dreadnought battleship design, the Regina Margherita class, which limited their utility as fleet scouts. And because their cruising radius was limited, they could not easily serve on foreign stations, where the ability to cruise long distances was required.

=== Characteristics ===
Plan and profile drawing of the Agordat class

The ships of the Agordat class were 87.6 meters (287 ft 5 in) long between perpendiculars and 91.6 m (300 ft 6 in) long overall. They had a beam of 9.32 m (30 ft 7 in) and a draft of 3.54 to 3.64 m (11 ft 7 in to 11 ft 11 in). Agordat and Coatit displaced up to 1,340 long tons (1,360 t) and 1,292 long tons (1,313 t), respectively, at full load. The hulls were constructed entirely from mild steel, with very little wood used to reduce the risk of fire in combat. The ships were originally fitted with two pole masts, but the mainmast was removed in both vessels later in their careers. The forecastle deck extended to the conning tower, where it stepped down to the main deck, which ran to main mast, where it was reduced to a short quarterdeck. They had a crew of between 153 and 185.

Their propulsion system consisted of a pair of horizontal, 4-cylinder triple-expansion steam engines each driving a single screw propeller, with steam supplied by eight Blechynden water-tube boilers that operated at a working pressure of 15 standard atmospheres (1,500 kPa). The boilers were trunked into two widely spaced funnels on the centerline, with those on Agordat being slightly taller than those on Coatit. The engines were rated at 8,129 to 8,215 indicated horsepower (6,062 to 6,126 kW) and produced a top speed of 22 to 23 knots (41 to 43 km/h; 25 to 26 mph), with Coatit being the slightly faster ship. The ships had a cruising radius of only about 300 nautical miles (560 km; 350 mi) at a speed of 10 knots (19 km/h; 12 mph).

Agordat and Coatit were armed with a main battery of twelve 76 mm L/40 guns mounted singly. (Note: L/40 refers to the length of the gun in terms of caliber.) Ten of the guns were placed in sponsons, with five on each side of the ship. The other two were in casemates in the forecastle. The ships were also equipped with two 450 mm (17.7 in) torpedo tubes. In 1919, Coatit was converted into a minelayer; this involved removing eight of the 76 mm guns and replacing them with a pair of 120 mm (4.7 in) L/40 guns. Agordat was converted into a gunboat in 1921 and she was similarly rearmed, though she retained eight of the 76 mm guns. The ships were only lightly armored, with a 20 mm (0.79 in) thick deck.

== Ships ==
Construction data
Name	Builder	Laid down	Launched	Commissioned
Agordat	Regio Cantiere di Castellammare di Stabia	18 February 1897	11 October 1899	26 September 1900
Coatit	Regio Cantiere di Castellammare di Stabia	8 April 1897	15 November 1899	1 October 1900

== Service history ==
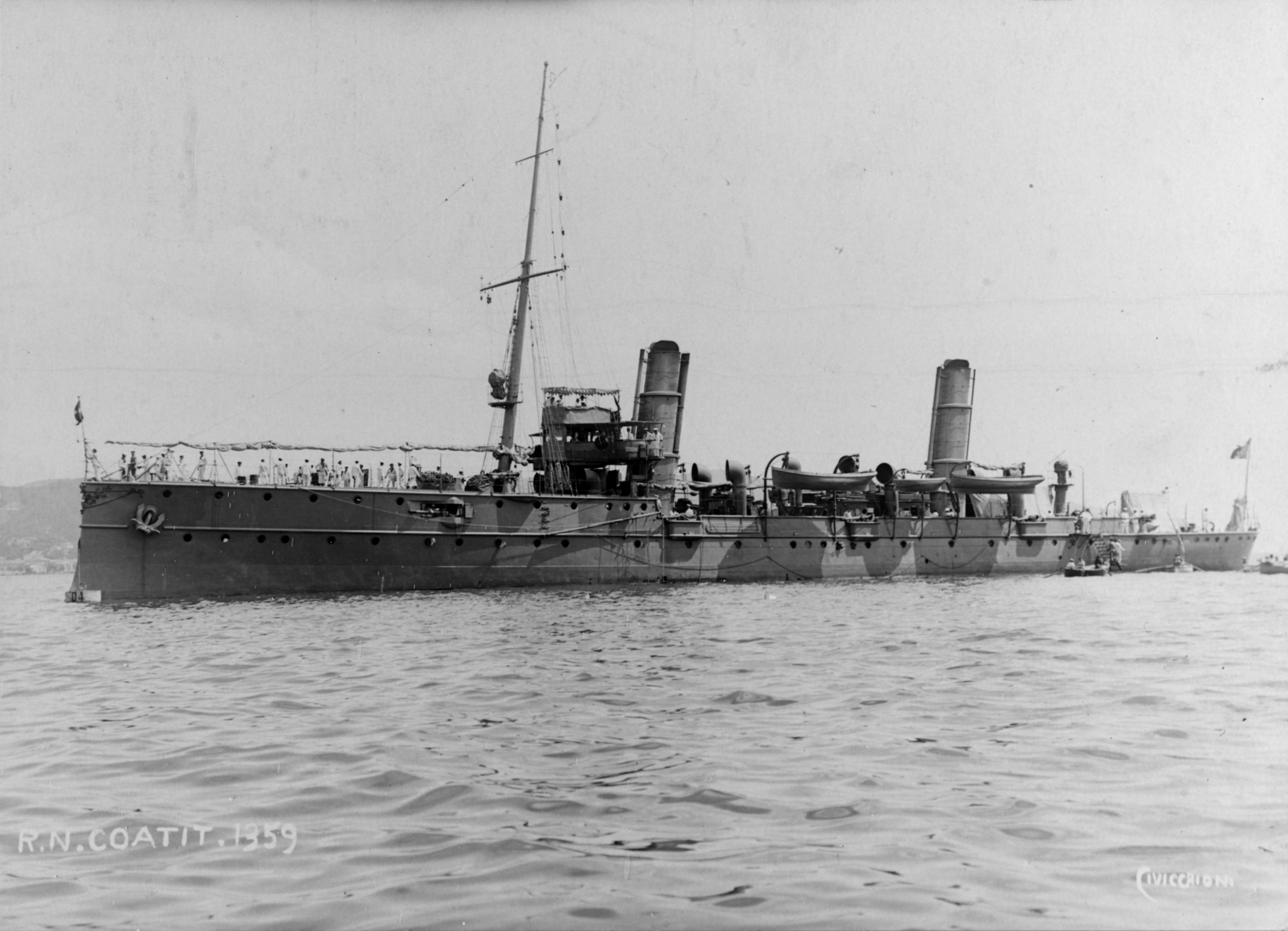
Coatit later in her career

After entering service, both ships were assigned to the main fleet, where they remained for the first several years of their careers. In 1904, Coatit was assigned to Italian Eritrea in the Red Sea, before returning to fleet service in the Mediterranean. Both ships saw action in the Italo-Turkish War in 1911–1912. They joined the escort for the troop convoy for an amphibious assault on Derna, Libya in late October 1911. They thereafter provided gunfire support to Italian troops ashore, with Agordat being transferred to Benghazi. In October 1912 Coatit shelled retreating Ottoman troops in Anatolia, which the commander of the French cruiser Bruix witnessed and protested as a violation of international law. Shortly thereafter, the Ottoman government agreed to surrender; signing the Treaty of Ouchy on 18 October.

During the First Balkan War, which broke out in the closing weeks of the Italo-Turkish War, Coatit and an international fleet was sent to safeguard foreign nationals in the Ottoman capital of Constantinople, which was threatened by a Bulgarian offensive. Neither ship saw action during World War I, though Agordat was involved in the occupation of Constantinople following the Ottoman defeat in November 1918. Both ships were reduced to secondary duties after the war, with Coatit being converted into a minelayer in 1919 and Agordat being reduced to a gunboat in 1921. Neither ship served for long in these new roles; Coatit was scrapped in 1920 and Agordat was sold to ship breakers in 1923.
