= SS Carthage (1910) =

1910 French passenger ship

History
- Name: (France) Carthage
- Namesake: Carthage
- Owner: Compagnie Générale Transatlantique
- Port of registry: Paris, France
- Builder: Swan Hunter
- Yard number: 828
- Laid down: 1909
- Launched: 25 April 1910
- Completed: August 1910
- Acquired: August 1910
- In service: August 1910
- Out of service: 4 July 1915
- Fate: Torpedoed and sunk on 4 July 1915

General characteristics
- Type: Passenger ship
- Tonnage: 5,601 GRT
- Length: 122.8 metres (402 ft 11 in)
- Beam: 15.6 metres (51 ft 2 in)
- Depth: 6.2 metres (20 ft 4 in)
- Installed power: Two 3cyl. Triple expansion steam engines
- Propulsion: Two screws
- Sail plan: Marseille - Tunis
- Speed: 19 knots
- Capacity: Accommodation for 334 passengers (170 in First class, 94 in Second class & 70 in Steerage)
- Notes: Two masts and two funnels

SS Carthage was a French Passenger ship that was torpedoed and sunk by the German submarine U-21 on 4 July 1915 whilst she was at anchor 2 nautical miles (3.7 km) off Cape Helles, Gallipoli, with the loss of 6 lives.

== Construction ==
Carthage was built at the Swan Hunter shipyard in Newcastle, United Kingdom and launched on 25 April 1910 before being completed in August of that same year. The ship was 122.8 metres (402 ft 11 in) long, had a beam of 15.6 metres (51 ft 2 in) and a depth of 6.2 metres (20 ft 4 in). She was assessed at 5,601 GRT and had two 3cyl. Triple expansion steam engines driving two screw propellers that could achieve a speed of 19 knots. The ship had accommodation for 334 passengers including 170 in First class, 94 in Second class & 70 in Steerage.

== Early Career ==
Carthage entered service in August 1910 for the Marseille to Tunis route for the Compagnie Générale Transatlantique. It was during a routine voyage on this route, that on 16 January 1912 at 6.30 am, Carthage was stopped by the Italian destroyer Agordat while she was 17 nautical miles (31 km) off the coast of Sardinia because the commander of Agordat had noticed that Carthage was carrying an airplane on her deck. Despite that this plane belonged to a French aviator who was transporting the plane to his home in Tunis, the Italian commander believed that the plane was being shipped to the Ottoman forces in Tripolitania with whome Italy was at war with and declared the plane to be contraband of war. Carthage was taken to Cagliari as the plane couldn't be transferred and was held there for six months. The ship was released when an arbitration tribunal declared the seizure of Carthage illegal and the Italian government was ordered to pay France 160,000 francs in reparation.

== World War I & Loss ==
Carthage was requisitioned by the French Navy following the outbreak of World War I in 1914 and transformed into an Auxiliary cruiser before the ship was repurposed as a Troopship on 23 February 1915. On 30 June 1915, Carthage arrived at Cape Helles, Gallipoli and lay at anchor 2 nautical miles (3.7 km) from the coast as she started to unload her cargo of ammunitions with the help of five barges that lay alongside the ship. Carthage had unloaded all her cargo over the period of four days and was taking on additional cargo which included horses for her next destination, when on 4 July 1915 at about 1.50 pm, the German submarine U-21 fired a torpedo at the ship from a distance of 800 metres (2,624 ft 8 in). The torpedo wake was spotted by the crew and Captain François Antoine Vecchioli, but nothing could prevent the torpedo from striking the port side of Carthage, just aft of the engine room. Carthage began to rapidly settle by the stern, which caused her bow to stand nearly vertical out of the water before she sank below the waves only four minutes after the attack. The five barges, as well as the tugboat Phoceen, the hospital ship Bretagne and several other vessels and Port Authority motorboats that were all nearby the wrecksite came to the aid of the stricken crew of Carthage. Out of her crew of 94, a total of six were missing and presumed lost with the ship while the other 88 were brought safely ashore.

== Wreck ==
Carthage lies upright in 85 metres (278 ft 10 in) of water and is in good condition. Part of her wooden deck is still preserved, as are the davits, chains, portholes, crew quarters, engine room, stairs and overall interior. The wreck is overgrown by marine life and her masts and funnels still lay off the ship's port side. The torpedo hole that caused her loss is also visible on the wreck.
