= Somerset Gough-Calthorpe =

Royal Navy Admiral of the Fleet (1864–1937)

Admiral of the Fleet The Honourable Sir Somerset Gough-Calthorpe GCB GCMG CVO DL
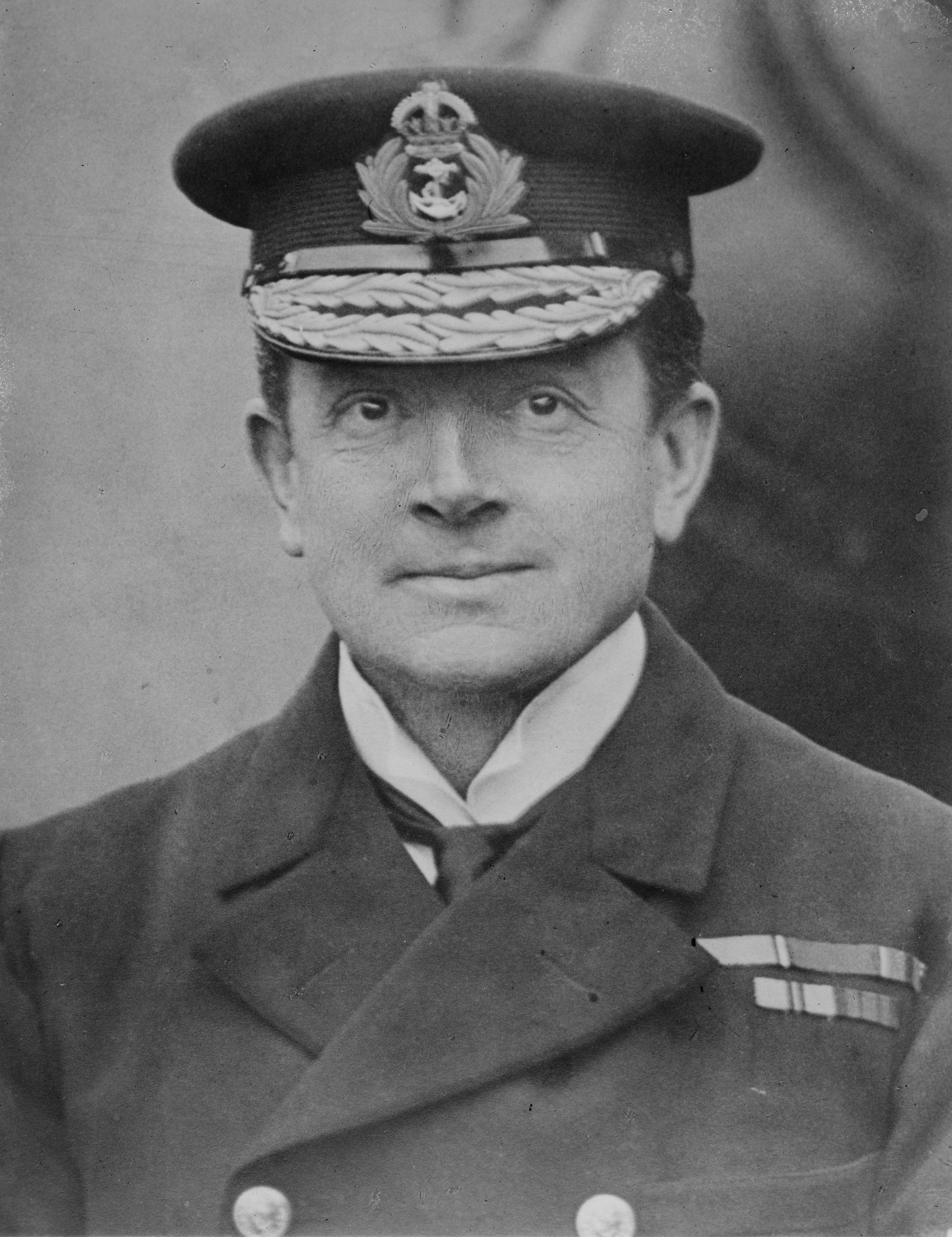
- Sir Somerset Gough-Calthorpe
- Born: 23 December 1864; London, England
- Died: 27 July 1937 (aged 72); Ryde, Isle of Wight, England
- Military career
- Allegiance: United Kingdom
- Branch: Royal Navy
- Service years: 1878–1930
- Rank: Admiral of the Fleet
- Commands: Portsmouth Command; Mediterranean Fleet; Coastguard and Reserves; 2nd Cruiser Squadron; HMS Dreadnought; HMS Hindustan; HMS Roxburgh; HMS Pandora; HMS Halcyon
- Conflicts: Fourth Anglo-Ashanti War; First World War
- Awards: Knight Grand Cross of the Order of the Bath; Knight Grand Cross of the Order of St Michael and St George; Commander of the Royal Victorian Order

Admiral of the Fleet Sir Somerset Arthur Gough-Calthorpe GCB, GCMG, CVO, DL (23 December 1864 – 27 July 1937), sometimes known as Sir Somerset Calthorpe, was a Royal Navy officer and a member of the Gough-Calthorpe family. After serving as a junior officer during the Fourth Anglo-Ashanti War, he became naval attaché observing the actions of the Imperial Russian Navy during the Russo-Japanese War and then went on to command an armoured cruiser and then a battleship during the early years of the 20th century.

During the First World War Gough-Calthorpe initially served as commander of the 2nd Cruiser Squadron of the Grand Fleet, then became Second Sea Lord and after that became Admiral commanding the Coastguard and Reserves. In the closing years of the War he served as Commander-in-Chief of the Mediterranean Fleet, in which capacity he signed the Armistice of Mudros on behalf of all the Allies, by which the Ottoman Empire accepted defeat and ceased hostilities. The Occupation of Constantinople began with the Allied fleet entering Constantinople in November 1918 and it was Gough-Calthorpe's flagship, HMS Superb, that led the way.

After the War Gough-Calthorpe served as British Commissioner in the Ottoman Empire during a time of considerable political instability associated with the partitioning of the Ottoman Empire and the allied intervention in the Russian Civil War.

== Naval career ==
=== Early career ===
Born the son of Lieutenant-General Somerset Gough-Calthorpe, 7th Baron Calthorpe, by his marriage to Eliza Maria Chamier, His grandfather on his mother's side was the novelist Captain Frederick Chamier RN. Gough-Calthorpe joined the Royal Navy as a cadet in the training ship HMS Britannia on 15 January 1878. Promoted to midshipman on 19 March 1880, he was appointed to the armoured cruiser HMS Northampton, flagship of the North America and West Indies Station later that year. Promoted to sub-lieutenant on 19 March 1884, he joined the corvette HMS Rover in the Training Squadron in September 1885 and, after further promotion to lieutenant on 19 March 1886, he transferred to the battleship HMS Colossus in June 1886. After attending the torpedo school HMS Vernon, he joined the directing staff there in 1890 and was then in August 1891 was deployed to Hong Kong on torpedo duties, before rejoining the directing staff at HMS Vernon in January 1894. He became torpedo officer in the cruiser HMS St George on the Cape of Good Hope and West Coast of Africa Station in October 1894 and saw action with naval brigades during the Fourth Anglo-Ashanti War.

Promoted to commander on 1 January 1896, Gough-Calthorpe became Executive Officer in the armoured cruiser HMS Imperieuse, flagship of the Pacific Station, in March 1896. After another tour at HMS Vernon, he became commanding officer of the torpedo gunboat HMS Halcyon in the Mediterranean Fleet in September 1900. He went on to be commanding officer of the cruiser HMS Pandora during propeller trials at Portsmouth in July 1901, and, having been promoted to captain on 1 January 1902 and having attended a course at the Royal Naval College, Greenwich, he became naval attaché observing the actions of the Imperial Russian Navy during the Russo-Japanese War. He became commanding officer of the armoured cruiser HMS Roxburgh in November 1905 and then, having been appointed a Member of the Royal Victorian Order on 25 September 1906, he became commanding officer of the battleship HMS Hindustan in December 1907. He then became Captain of the Fleet for the Home Fleet in the battleship HMS Dreadnought in December 1909. He was advanced to Commander of the Royal Victorian Order on 2 August 1910. Promoted to rear admiral on 27 August 1911 and, having been appointed a Companion of the Order of the Bath on 27 September 1912, he became second-in-command of the 1st Battle Squadron, with his flag in the battleship HMS St Vincent, in December 1912. In 1912, he was appointed as one of the assessors assisting the British inquiry into the sinking of the RMS Titanic.

=== First World War ===
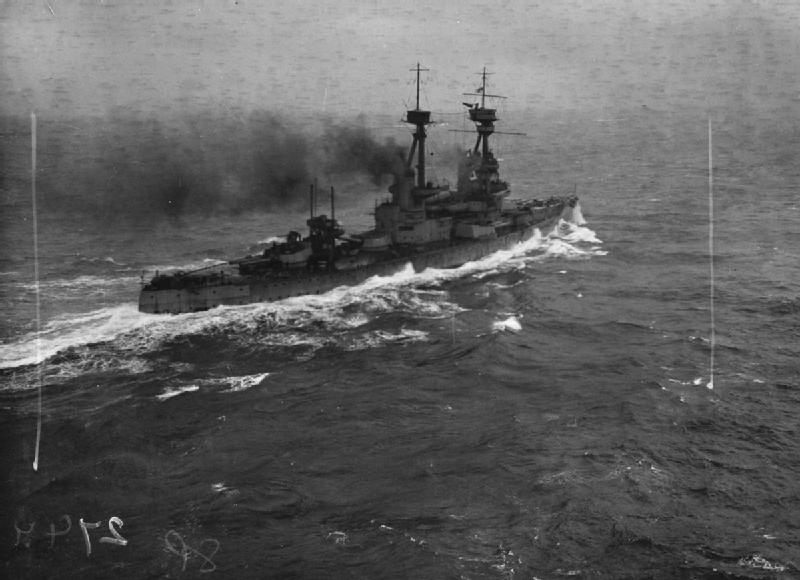
The battleship HMS Superb which, as Gough-Calthorpe's flagship, led the Allied fleet that steamed into Constantinople in November 1918

Gough-Calthorpe became commander of the 2nd Cruiser Squadron of the Grand Fleet, with his flag in the armoured cruiser HMS Shannon, in July 1914 on the outbreak of the First World War. Advanced to Knight Commander of the Order of the Bath on 1 January 1916, he became Second Sea Lord in July 1916 and Admiral commanding the Coastguard and Reserves in December 1916. Promoted to vice-admiral on 26 April 1917, he became Commander-in-Chief, Mediterranean Fleet, with his flag in the battleship HMS Superb, in July 1917. In that capacity he established a complex convoy system to protect British and allied shipping at sea in the Mediterranean from attack by enemy submarines.

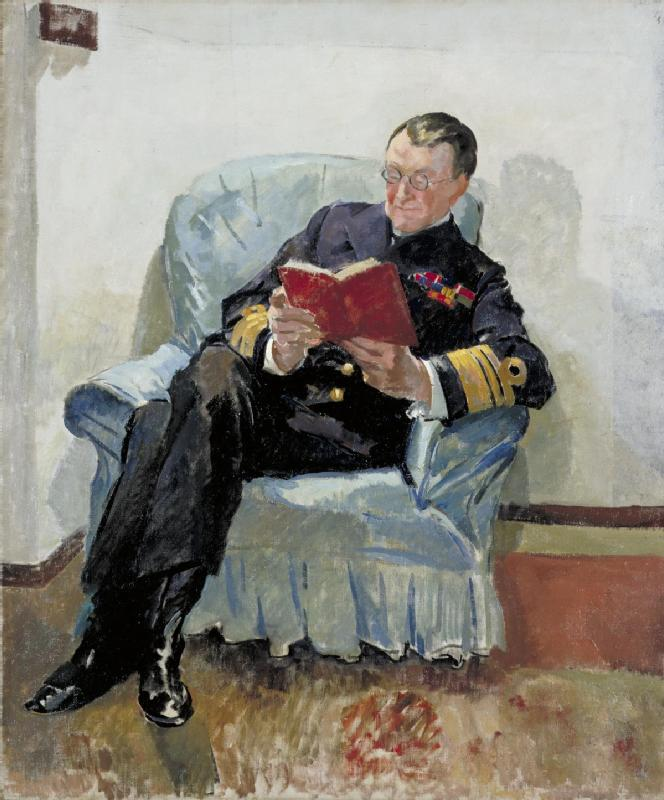
Portrait by Philip Connard of Gough-Calthorpe on board HMS Superb at Constantinople in November 1918

He went on to sign the Armistice of Mudros on behalf of all the Allies on 30 October 1918, by which the Ottoman Empire accepted defeat and ceased hostilities. Georges Clemenceau, Prime Minister of France, complained that Admiral Dominique-Marie Gauchet had not been present at the treaty signing but the British Government gave Gough-Calthorpe its full backing. When the Allied fleet steamed into Constantinople in November 1918, it was Gough-Calthorpe's flagship, HMS Superb, that led the way.

=== After the war ===
Gough-Calthorpe became British Commissioner in the Ottoman Empire at the end of the War during a time of considerable political instability associated with the partitioning of the Ottoman Empire and the allied intervention in the Russian Civil War. Appointed a Knight Grand Cross of the Order of St Michael and St George on 1 January 1919 and promoted to full admiral on 31 July 1919, he became Commander-in-Chief, Portsmouth in April 1920. He also became naval representative to the Permanent Armaments Commission of the League of Nations in July 1920.

Gough-Calthorpe was advanced to Knight Grand Cross of the Order of the Bath on 3 June 1922, appointed a Deputy Lieutenant for the Isle of Wight on 14 February 1924 and appointed First and Principal Naval Aide-de-Camp to the King on 31 July 1924. Promoted to Admiral of the Fleet on 8 May 1925, he retired in May 1930 and, having been appointed a Deputy Lieutenant for Southampton on 26 March 1932, died at his home in Ryde on the Isle of Wight on 27 July 1937.

== Family ==
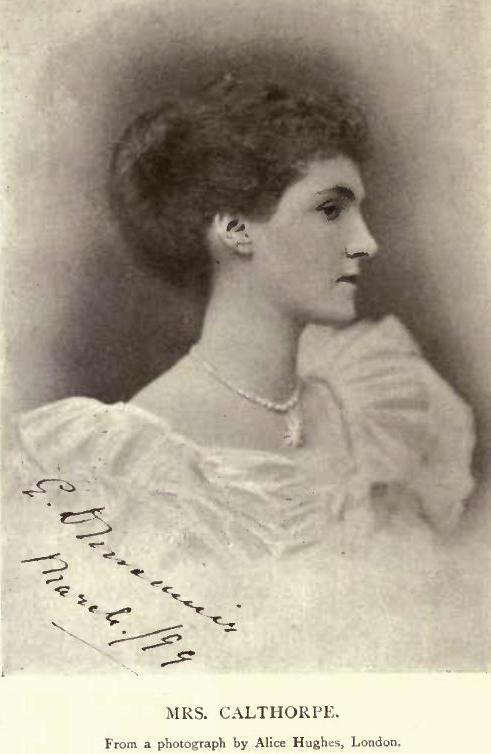
Mrs. Effie Calthorpe née Dunsmuir

Gough-Calthorpe married at St George's, Hanover Square, London on 27 February 1900 Effie Dunsmuir, daughter of Hon. Robert Dunsmuir, of Craigdarroch Castle, Victoria, British Columbia, and his wife, Joan White, daughter of Alexander White, of Kilmarnock, Scotland. They had no children.

== Honours and awards ==
- Knight Grand Cross of the Order of the Bath – 3 June 1922 (KCB – 1 January 1916; CB – 27 September 1912)
- Knight Grand Cross of the Order of St Michael and St George – 1 January 1919
- Commander of the Royal Victorian Order – 2 August 1910 (MVO – 25 September 1906)
- Grand Officer of the Legion of Honour (France) – 12 December 1918
- Medal of Military Merit (Greece) – 16 September 1919
- Grand Officer of the Order of Saints Maurice and Lazarus (Italy) – 6 April 1918
- Grand Cross of the Order of the Redeemer (Greece) – 24 May 1919
- Grand Cross of the Order of the Crown of Italy (Italy) – 16 September 1919

== See also ==
- Armistice of Mudros
- Occupation of Istanbul

== Sources ==
- Heathcote, Tony (2002). The British Admirals of the Fleet 1734 – 1995. Pen & Sword Ltd. ISBN 0-85052-835-6.

Military offices
Preceded by Sir Frederick Hamilton	Second Sea Lord; 1916	Succeeded by Sir Cecil Burney
Vacant Title last held by Sir Berkeley Milne	Commander-in-Chief, Mediterranean Fleet; 1917–1919	Succeeded by Sir John de Robeck
First	British High Commissioner at Constantinople; 1918–1919	Succeeded by Sir John de Robeck
Preceded by Sir Cecil Burney	Commander-in-Chief, Portsmouth; 1920–1923	Succeeded by Sir Sydney Fremantle
Honorary titles
Preceded by Sir Charles Madden, Bt.	First and Principal Naval Aide-de-Camp; 1924–1925	Succeeded by Sir Montague Browning
