= Italian cruiser Coatit =

Torpedo cruiser of the Italian Royal Navy

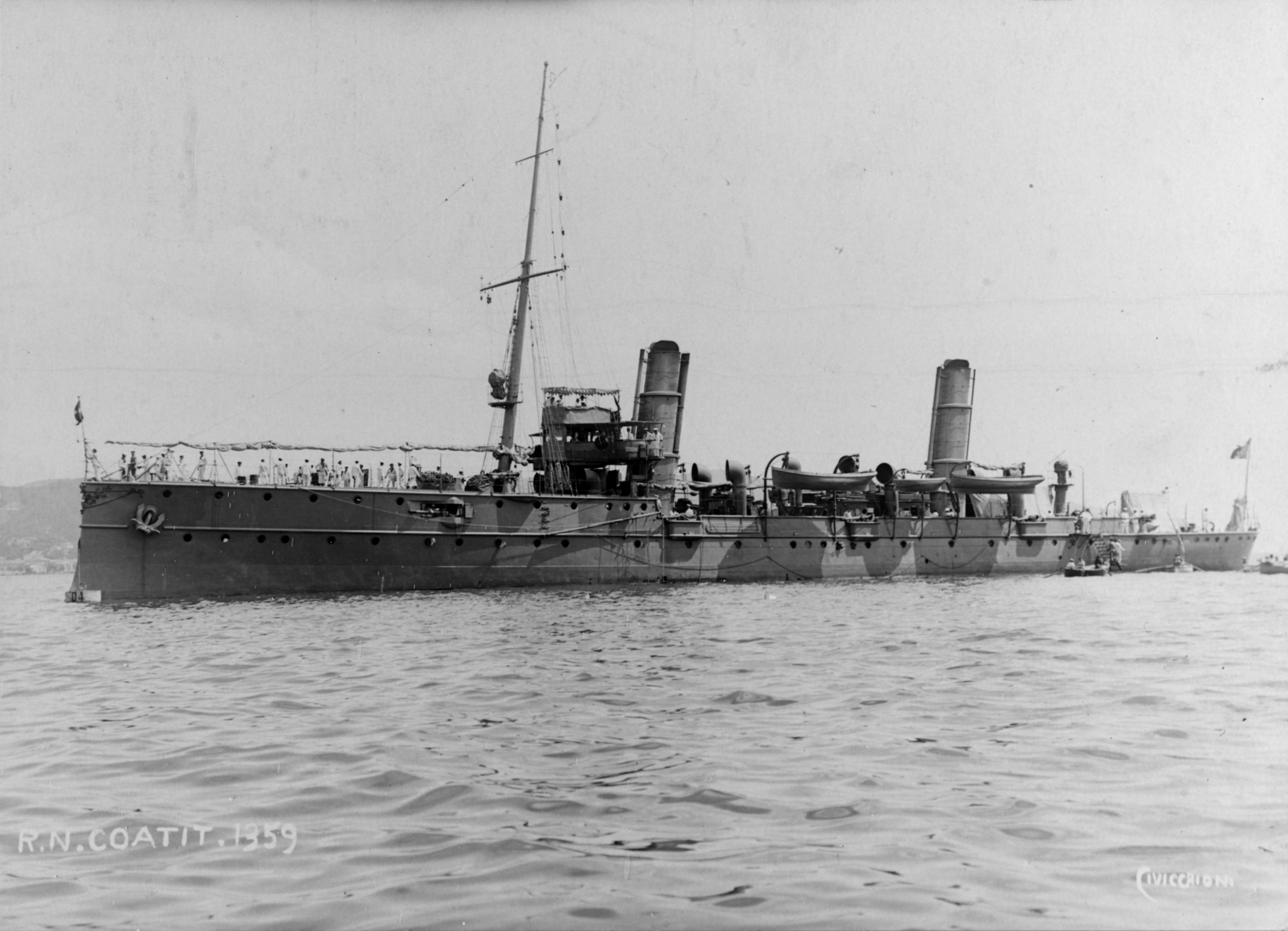
- Coatit

History

Italy
- Name: Coatit
- Namesake: Battle of Coatit
- Builder: Regio Cantiere di Castellammare di Stabia
- Laid down: 8 April 1897
- Launched: 15 November 1899
- Commissioned: 1 October 1900
- Fate: Sold for scrapping, 11 June 1920

General characteristics
- Class & type: Agordat-class torpedo cruiser
- Displacement: Full load: 1,292 long tons (1,313 t)
- Length: 91.6 m (300 ft 6 in)
- Beam: 9.32 m (30 ft 7 in)
- Draft: 3.54 m (11 ft 7 in)
- Installed power: 8 × Blechynden boilers; 8,215 indicated horsepower (6,126 kW)
- Propulsion: 2 × triple-expansion steam engines; 2 × screw propellers
- Speed: 23 knots (43 km/h; 26 mph)
- Range: 300 nmi (560 km; 350 mi) at 10 knots (19 km/h; 12 mph)
- Complement: 153–185
- Armament: 12 × 76 mm (3 in) guns; 2 × 450 mm (17.7 in) torpedo tubes
- Armor: Deck: 20 mm (0.79 in)

Coatit was a torpedo cruiser of the Italian Regia Marina (Royal Navy) built in the late 1890s. She was the second and final member of the Agordat class. The ship, which was armed with twelve 76 mm (3 in) guns and two 450 mm (17.7 in) torpedo tubes, was too slow and short-ranged to be able to scout effectively for the fleet, so her career was limited. She saw action during the Italo-Turkish War in 1911–1912, where she provided gunfire support to Italian troops in North Africa. She also caused a minor diplomatic incident from an attack on retreating Ottoman soldiers in Anatolia. Coatit was part of an international fleet sent to Constantinople when the city appeared to be at risk of falling to the Bulgarian Army during the First Balkan War. In 1919, she was converted into a minelayer and was sold for scrap in 1920.

== Design ==
Plan and profile drawing of the Agordat class

Through the 1880s and 1890s, the Italian Regia Marina (Royal Navy) had built a series of torpedo cruisers in a brief experiment with the doctrine of the Jeune École under the direction of Benedetto Brin. The Jeune École theory argued that small, cheap torpedo-armed vessels would replace the large and expensive ironclad warships that had dominated naval doctrine since the 1860s. The two Agordat-class cruisers were the culmination of this line of development. By the time of their construction, the Jeune École was no longer in vogue, and so they were intended to serve as scouts for Italy's fleet of pre-dreadnought battleships.

Coatit was 91.6 meters (300 ft 6 in) long overall and had a beam of 9.32 m (30 ft 7 in) and a draft of 3.54 m (11 ft 7 in). She displaced up to 1,292 long tons (1,313 t) at full load. The ship had a raised forecastle deck that extended for the first third of the hull, after which it stepped down to the main deck. Coatit had a fairly minimal superstructure, consisting primarily of a small conning tower. She was fitted with two pole masts. She had a crew of between 153 and 185 that varied over the course of her career.

Her propulsion system consisted of a pair of horizontal triple-expansion steam engines each driving a single screw propeller. Steam was supplied by eight Blechynden water-tube boilers, which were ducted into two widely spaced funnels. Her engines were rated at 8,215 indicated horsepower (6,126 kW) and produced a top speed of 23 knots (43 km/h; 26 mph). The ship had a cruising radius of about 300 nautical miles (560 km; 350 mi) at a more economical speed of 10 knots (19 km/h; 12 mph).

Coatit was armed with a main battery of twelve 76 mm (3 in) L/40 guns mounted singly. Two guns were placed side-by-side on the forecastle, two were placed in casemates in the forecastle, another pair were placed aft, and the remaining six were distributed along the broadside. She was also equipped with two 450 mm (17.7 in) torpedo tubes. The ship was only lightly armored with a 20 mm (0.79 in) thick deck, which angled downward at the sides to provide a measure of protection against light gunfire.

== Service history ==
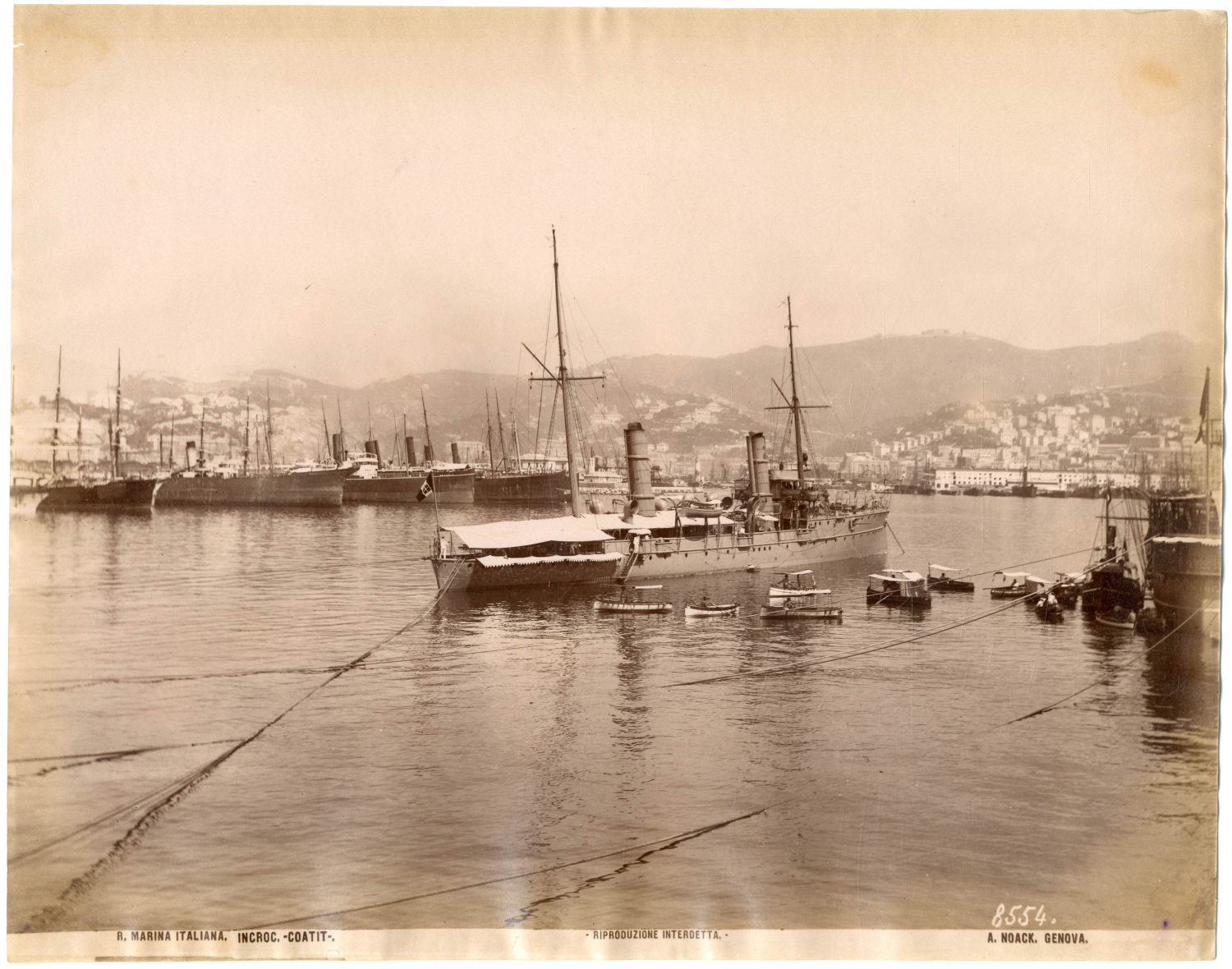
Coatit in Genoa

The keel for Coatit was laid down at the Castellammare shipyard on 8 April 1897 and her completed hull was launched on 15 November 1899. After completing fitting-out work, the new cruiser was commissioned into the Italian fleet on 1 October 1900. She proved to be too slow and short-legged to be useful as a fleet scout, which limited her active duty career. She served in the main fleet in 1902–1904, during which time the fleet was kept in a state of readiness for seven months. For the remaining five months, the ships had reduced crews. In 1904, the ship was transferred to the Red Sea and stationed in Italy's colony in Eritrea along with the corvette Cristoforo Colombo, the gunboat Volturno, and the aviso Galileo Coatit was assigned to the hostile force that was tasked with simulating an attempt to land troops on Sicily during the 1908 fleet maneuvers.

=== Italo-Turkish War and the Balkan Wars ===
At the outbreak of the Italo-Turkish War against the Ottoman Empire in September 1911, Coatit was stationed in the 4th Division of the 2nd Squadron, under Rear Admiral Paolo Thaon di Revel, the commander of the division. Coatit protected several battleships and armored cruisers while they bombarded the defenses of Tripoli on 3–4 October. Coatit, the armored cruiser Varese, and sixteen destroyers were tasked with patrolling the flanks of the bombardment force to prevent a surprise attack by the Ottoman Navy, which did not materialize.

On 15 October, Coatit and her sister joined the battleship Napoli, the armored cruisers Pisa, Amalfi, and San Marco, three destroyers, and several troop transports for an attack on the port of Derna. Negotiators were sent ashore to attempt to secure the surrender of the garrison, which was refused. Napoli and the armored cruisers bombarded the Ottoman positions throughout the day, and on 18 October the Ottomans withdrew, allowing the Italian troops to come ashore and take possession of the port. The fleet remained offshore and helped to repel Ottoman counterattacks over the following two weeks. On 3 October 1912, Coatit bombarded the port of Kalkan. She thereafter shelled an Ottoman infantry battalion in the area, which fled; she nevertheless continued to fire on the retreating troops, expending around 200 rounds during the attack. The French cruiser Bruix was nearby and witnessed the attack, which her commander protested as a breach of international law.

Coatit was among an international force that entered the Ottoman capital city, Constantinople, during the First Balkan War in November 1912, less than a month after the end of the Italo-Turkish War. She and the battleship Emanuele Filiberto entered the straits on 11 November, along with the French armored cruisers Victor Hugo and Léon Gambetta, where they joined a pair of British cruisers. Warships from Germany, including the battlecruiser Goeben, Russia—the battleship Rostislav—and Spain arrived thereafter. The ships put a force of about 3,000 men ashore to protect their nationals, though by the end of the month, the Bulgarian advance on the city had been halted. The international fleet nevertheless remained in the Sea of Marmara for a time until it was withdrawn to the island of Crete and subsequently dispersed.

=== World War I and fate ===
By 1914, Coatit had been assigned to the Division for Special Purposes, part of the 2nd Squadron of the Italian fleet. The division consisted of the two Regina Margherita-class battleships and the two Ammiraglio di Saint Bon-class battleships, for which Coatit served as the scout vessel. Italy, a member of the Central Powers, declared neutrality at the start of World War I in August 1914, but by May 1915, the Triple Entente had convinced the Italians to enter the war against their former allies. Admiral Paolo Thaon di Revel, the Italian naval chief of staff, believed that Austro-Hungarian submarines could operate too effectively in the narrow waters of the Adriatic, which could also be easily seeded with minefields. The threat from these underwater weapons was too serious for him to use the fleet in an active way. Instead, Revel decided to implement blockade at the relatively safer southern end of the Adriatic with the main fleet, while smaller vessels, such as the MAS boats, conducted raids on Austro-Hungarian ships and installations.

After the war, Coatit was converted into a minelayer in 1919. Eight of the 76 mm guns and her torpedo tubes were removed and a pair of 120 mm (4.7 in) L/40 guns were installed. She served only briefly in this role and she was sold to ship breakers on 11 June 1920.
