= Occupation of Constantinople =

Allied occupation of the city after WWI

- Part of the partition of the Ottoman Empire and the Turkish War of Independence
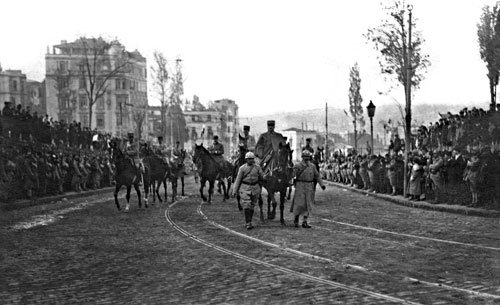
- Louis Franchet d'Espèrey marching in Beyoğlu, 8 February 1919
Date	12 November 1918 – 4 October 1923 (4 years, 10 months, 3 weeks and 1 day)
Location	Constantinople, Ottoman Empire
Result	Allied military occupation
Territorial changes	Recognition of Turkey with Treaty of Lausanne

Belligerents
British Empire: (British Raj) British India; France: French West Africa; Italy; Greece	Ottoman Empire	Turkish National Movement

Commanders and leaders
(United Kingdom) Somerset Arthur Gough-Calthorpe (United Kingdom) George Milne (French Third Republic) Louis Franchet d'Esperey (Kingdom of Italy) Carlo Sforza (Kingdom of Greece) Efthimios Kanellopoulos (1918–1921) (Kingdom of Greece) Charalambos Simopoulos (1921–1923)	(Ottoman Empire) Ali Sait Pasha¹	Selâhattin Âdil Pasha^{2}

Strength
- Land forces on 13 November 1918: 2,616 British, 540 French, 470 Italian (Total: 3,626 soldiers) Land forces by 5 November 1919: (United Kingdom of Great Britain and Ireland) : 27,419 soldiers (27 artillery batteries, 160 machine guns) (French Third Republic) : 19,069 soldiers (30 cannons, 91 machine guns) (Kingdom of Italy) : 3,992 soldiers (Kingdom of Greece) : 795 soldiers (160 machine guns); Total: ~51,300 soldiers (411 machine guns, 57 artillery pieces) Naval forces: 13 November 1918: 50–61 warships 15 November 1918: 167 warships+auxiliary ships
- 1: Commander of the XXV Corps and the Constantinople's Guard (6 October 1919 – 16 March 1920); 2: Commander of the Istanbul Command (10 December 1922 – 29 September 1923)

The occupation of Constantinople (now Istanbul, 12 November 1918 – 4 October 1923), the capital of the Ottoman Empire, by British, French, Italian, and Greek forces, took place in accordance with the Armistice of Mudros, which ended Ottoman participation in the First World War. The first French troops entered the city on 12 November 1918, followed by British troops the next day. The Italian troops landed in Galata on 7 February 1919.

Allied troops occupied zones based on the existing divisions of Constantinople (Istanbul) and set up an Allied military administration early in December 1918. The occupation had two stages: the initial phase in accordance with the Armistice gave way in 1920 to a more formal arrangement on the eve of the signing of the Treaty of Sèvres. Ultimately, the Treaty of Lausanne, signed on 24 July 1923, led to the end of the occupation. The last troops of the Allies departed from the city on 4 October 1923, and the first troops of the Ankara government, commanded by Şükrü Naili Pasha (3rd Corps), entered the city with a ceremony on 6 October 1923, which has been marked as the Liberation Day of Istanbul (Turkish: İstanbul'un Kurtuluşu) and is commemorated every year on its anniversary.

1918 was the first time the city had changed hands since the fall of Constantinople in 1453. Along with the occupation of Smyrna, it spurred the establishment of the Turkish National Movement, leading to the Turkish War of Independence.

== Background ==
=== Demographics ===
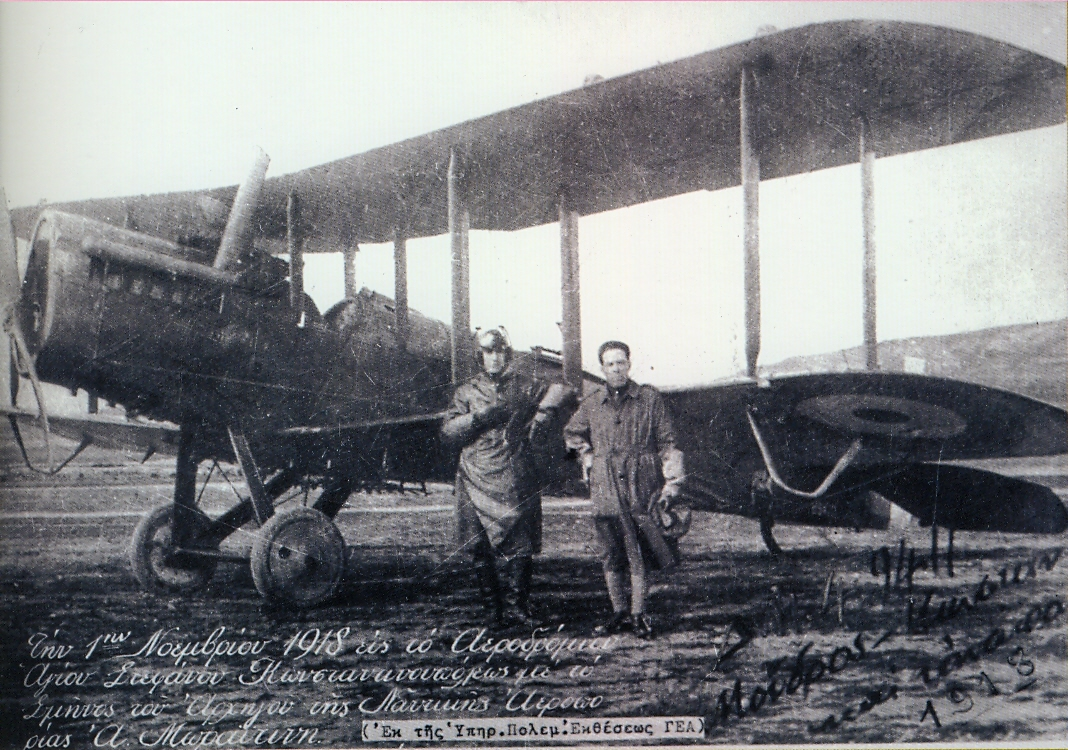
Greek naval aviators at Mudros Airfield, prior to their takeoff for San Stefano on 14 November, 1918. Four de Havilland DH.4 aircraft took on fuel at San Stefano, flew over Constantinople, then vacated the zone, never to return again.

The Ottomans estimated that the population of Constantinople in 1920 was between 800,000 and 1,200,000 inhabitants, having collected population statistics from various religious bodies. The uncertainty in the figure reflects the uncounted population of war refugees and disagreements as to the boundaries of the city. Half or less were Muslim, with the rest being largely Greek Orthodox, Armenian Apostolic, and Jewish; there had been a substantial Western European population before the war.

=== Legal basis ===
The Armistice of Mudros of 30 October 1918, which ended Ottoman involvement in World War I, mentions the occupation of the Bosporus fort and the Dardanelles fort. That day, Admiral Somerset Gough-Calthorpe, the British signatory, stated the Triple Entente's position that they had no intention to dismantle the government or to place it under military occupation by "occupying Constantinople". This verbal promise and lack of mention of the occupation of Constantinople in the armistice proper did not change the realities for the Ottoman Empire. Calthorpe put the British position as "No kind of favour whatsoever to any Turk and to hold out no hope for them". The Ottoman side returned to the capital with a personal letter from Calthorpe, intended for Rauf Orbay, in which he promised on behalf of the British government that only British and French troops would be used in the occupation of the Straits fortifications. A small number of Ottoman troops could be allowed to stay on in the occupied areas as a symbol of sovereignty.

=== Calculations ===
Unlike Berlin, Vienna, or Sofia, Constantinople was to be the only Central Powers capital to be occupied. Lord Curzon ordered the city occupied. Motivations included anti-Communism (securing a life line of support for the White Russians), settling the score of the Gallipoli campaign, and weakening the morale of Islamist movements in India.

== Military administration ==
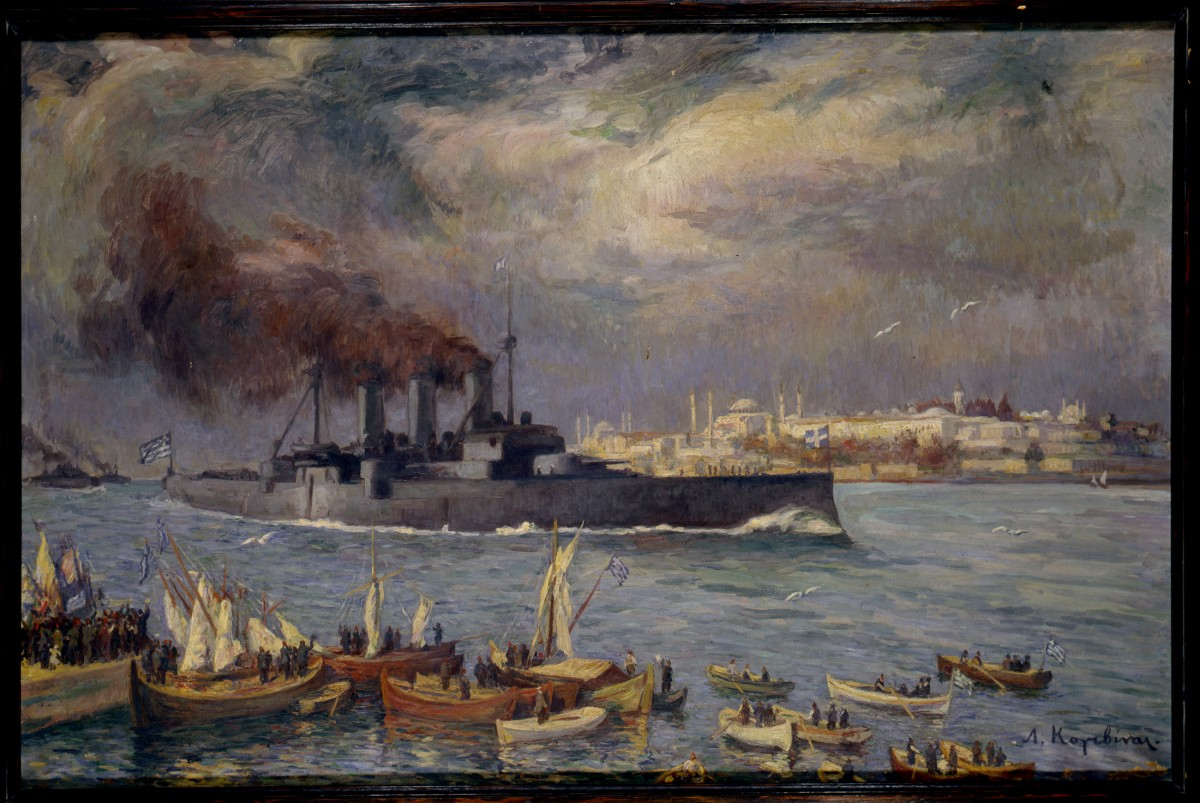
The armored cruiser Averof of the Greek Navy in the Bosphorus, 1919

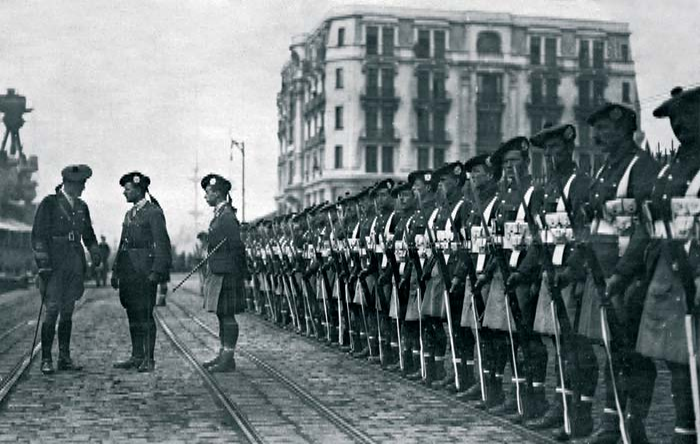
British occupation forces at the port of Karaköy, in front of the coastal tram line. The Art Nouveau style building in the background is the Turkish Maritime Lines (Türkiye Denizcilik İşletmeleri) headquarters.

The Allies began to occupy Ottoman territory soon after the Armistice of Mudros; on 12 November 1918, a French brigade entered Constantinople. The first British troops entered the city on the following day. Early in December 1918, Allied troops occupied sections of Constantinople and set up an Allied military administration. The Military Command of the Allied Forces of Occupation dispensed the following services: passport control, police), inter-Allied tribunals and courts martial (1920), and prisons.

On 7 February 1919, an Italian battalion with 19 officers and 740 soldiers landed at the Galata pier; one day later they were joined by 283 Carabinieri, commanded by Colonel Balduino Caprini. The Carabinieri assumed police tasks.

On 10 February 1919, the commission divided the city into three zones for police matters: Stambul (the old city) was assigned to the French, Pera-Galata to the British and Kadıköy and Scutari to the Italians. French had one prison in Kumkapı and the British had five: Galata Tower, Arabian Han, Sansarian Han, Hotel Kroecker and Shahin Pasha Hotel. High Commissioner Admiral Somerset Gough-Calthorpe was assigned as the military adviser to Constantinople.

=== Establishing authority ===
The British rounded up a number of members of the old establishment and interned them in Malta, awaiting their trial for alleged crimes during World War I. Calthorpe included only Turkish members of the Government of Ahmet Tevfik Pasha and the military/political personalities. He wanted to send a message that a military occupation was in effect and failure to comply would end with harsh punishment. His position was not shared with other partners. The French Government's response to those accused was "distinction to disadvantage of Muslim-Turks while Bulgarian, Austrian and German offenders were as yet neither arrested nor molested". However, the government and the Sultan understood the message. In February 1919, Allies were informed that the Ottoman Empire was in compliance with its full apparatus to the occupation forces. Any source of conflict (including Armenian questions) would be investigated by a commission, to which neutral governments could attach two legal superintendents. Calthorpe's correspondence to Foreign Office was "The action undertaken for the arrests was very satisfactory, and has, I think, intimidated the Committee of Union and Progress of Constantinople".

=== Ottoman courts-martial ===
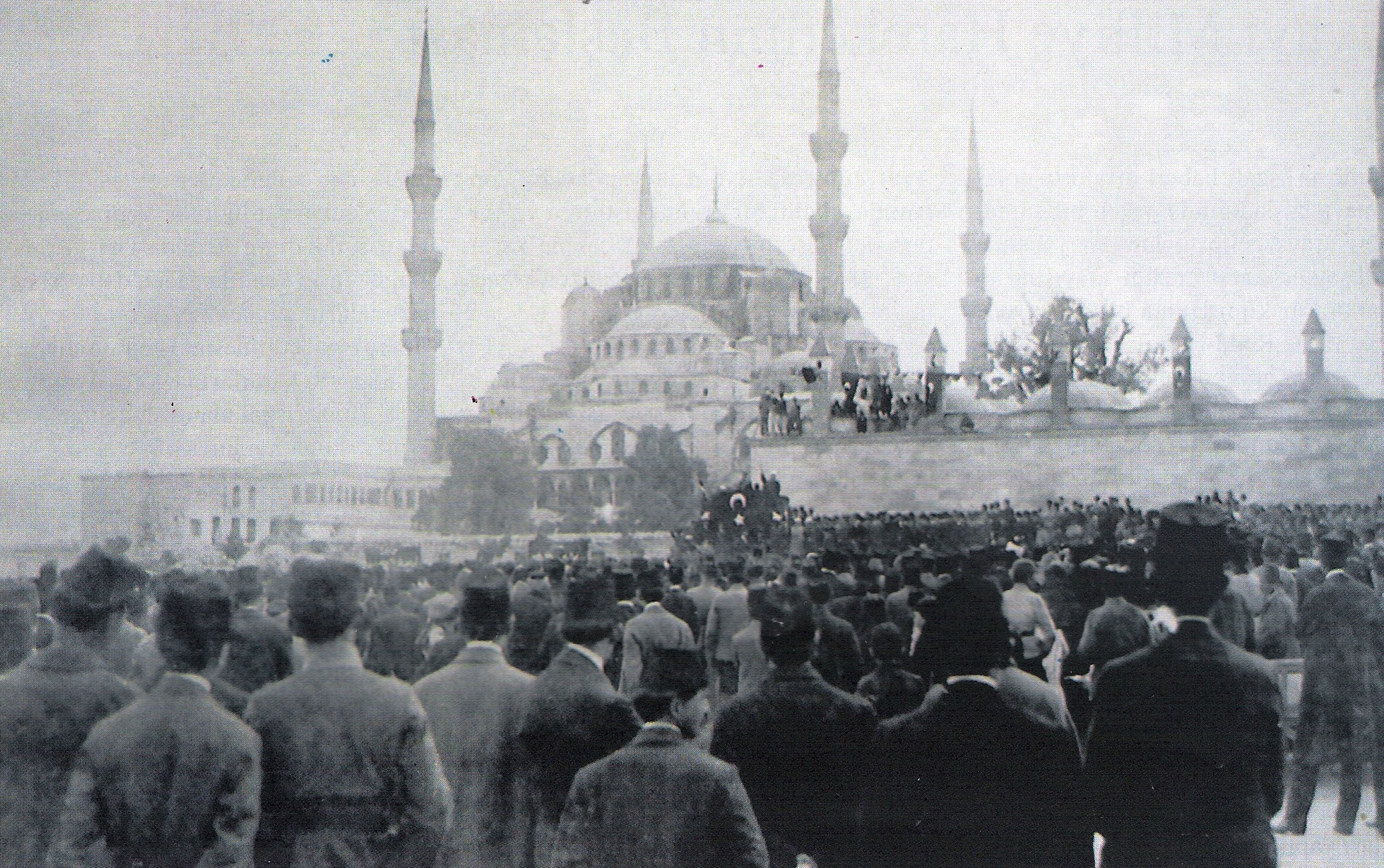
Constantinople, 23 May 1919: Sultanahmet demonstrations against the Occupation of Smyrna by the Kingdom of Greece

Calthorpe's message was fully noted by the Sultan. There was an eastern tradition of presenting gifts to the authority during serious conflicts, sometimes "falling of heads". There was no higher goal than preserving the integrity of the Ottoman Institution. If Calthorpe's anger could be calmed down by foisting the blame on a few members of the Committee of Union and Progress, the Ottoman Empire could thereby receive more lenient treatment at the Paris peace conference. The trials began in Istanbul on 28 April 1919. The prosecution presented "forty-two authenticated documents substantiating the charges therein, many bearing dates, identification of senders of the cipher telegrams and letters, and names of recipients." On 22 July, the court-martial found several defendants guilty of subverting constitutionalism by force and found them responsible for massacres. During its whole existence from 28 April 1919, to 29 March 1920, Ottoman trials were performed very poorly and with increasing inefficiency, as presumed guilty people were already intended as a sacrifice to save the Empire. However, as an occupation authority, the historical rightfulness of the Allies was at stake. Calthorpe wrote to London that the trials were "proving to be a farce and injurious to our own prestige and to that of the Turkish government". The Allies considered Ottoman trials as a travesty of justice, so Ottoman justice had to be replaced with Western justice by moving the trials to Malta as "International" trials. The "International" trials declined to use any evidence developed by the Ottoman tribunals. When the International trials were staged, Calthorpe was replaced by John de Robeck. De Robeck said regarding the trials "that its findings cannot be held of any account at all." All of the Malta exiles were released.

=== A new movement ===
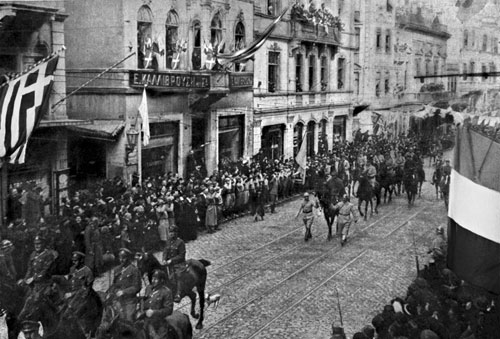
Allied occupation troops marching along the Grande Rue de Péra

Calthorpe was alarmed when he learned that the victor of Gallipoli had become the inspector general for Anatolia, and Mustafa Kemal's behavior during this period did nothing to improve matters. Calthorpe urged that Kemal be recalled. Thanks to friends and sympathizers of Kemal in government circles, a 'compromise' was developed whereby the power of the inspector general was curbed, at least on paper. "Inspector General" became a title that had no power to command. On 23 June 1919, Somerset Arthur Gough-Calthorpe began to understand Kemal and his role in the establishment of the Turkish national movement. He sent a report about Kemal to the Foreign Office. His remarks were downplayed by George Kidson of the Eastern Department. Captain Hurst (British army) in Samsun warned Calthorpe one more time about the Turkish national movement, but his units were replaced with a brigade of Gurkhas.

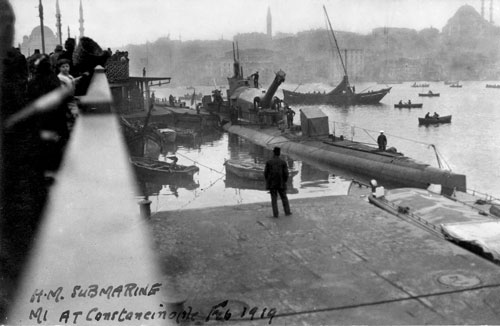
M1 in Constantinople.

Calthorpe was assigned to another position on 5 August 1919, and left Constantinople.

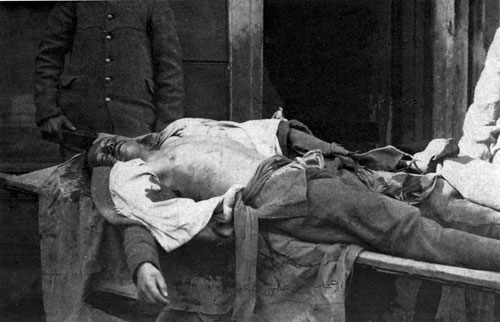
Death of a Turkish soldier during a British raid against Mızıka watchhouse at Şehzadebaşı on 16 March 1920

=== John de Robeck, August 1919–1922 ===
In August 1919 Vice-Admiral de Robeck replaced Calthorpe with the title of "Commander-in-Chief, Mediterranean, and High Commissioner at Constantinople". He was responsible for activities regarding Russia and Turkey (Ottoman Empire-Turkish national movement).

De Robeck was very worried by the defiant mood of the Ottoman parliament. When 1920 arrived, he was concerned by reports that substantial stocks of arms were reaching Turkish National Movement, some from French and Italian sources. In one of his letters to London, he asked: "Against whom would these sources be employed?"

In London, the Conference of London (February 1920) took place; it featured discussions about settling the treaty terms to be offered in San Remo. De Robeck reminded participants that Anatolia was moving into a resistance stage. There were arguments of "National Pact" (Misak-ı Milli) circulating, and if these were solidified, it would take a longer time and more resources to handle the case (partitioning of the Ottoman Empire). He tried to persuade the leaders to take quick action to control the Sultan and pressure the rebels from both directions. This request posed awkward problems at the highest level: promises for national sovereignty were on the table and the United States was fast withdrawing into isolation.

== Treaty of Sèvres ==
=== Ottoman parliament of 1920 ===
The newly elected Ottoman parliament in Constantinople did not recognize the occupation they developed a National Pact (Misak-ı Milli). They adopted six principles, which called for self-determination, the security of Constantinople, the opening of the Straits, and the abolition of the capitulations. While in Constantinople self-determination and protection of the Ottoman Empire were voiced, the Khilafat Movement in India tried to influence the British government to protect the caliphate of the Ottoman Empire, and though it was primarily a Muslim religious movement, the Khilafat struggle was becoming a part of the wider Indian independence movement. Both movements (Misak-ı Milli and the Khilafat Movement) shared similar notions on ideology; at the Conference of London (February 1920) Allies concentrated on these issues.

The Ottoman Empire lost World War I, but Misak-ı Milli with the local Khilafat Movement was still fighting the Allies.

=== Solidification of the partition, February 1920 ===
The plans for partitioning of the Ottoman Empire needed to be solidified. At the Conference of London on 4 March 1920, the Triple Entente decided to implement its previous (secret) agreements and form what would be the Treaty of Sèvres. In doing so, all forms of resistance originating from the Ottoman Empire (rebellions, Sultan, etc.) were to be dismantled. The Allies' military forces in Constantinople ordered that the necessary actions be taken; while the political side increased efforts to put the Treaty of Sèvres into writing.

Negotiations for the Treaty of Sèvres presumed a Greek, French-Armenian, Wilsonian Armenia and Italian occupation region being Christian administrations, as opposed to the prior Muslim administration of the Ottoman Empire. Muslim citizens of the Ottoman Empire perceived this plan as depriving them of sovereignty. British intelligence registered the Turkish national movement as a movement of the Muslim citizens of Anatolia. The Muslim unrest in Anatolia brought two arguments to the British government regarding the new establishments: the Muslim administration was not safe for Christians; that the Treaty of Sèvres was the only way that Christians could be safe. Enforcing the Treaty of Sèvres could not happen without repressing Kemal's national movement.

The British claimed that if the Allies could not control Anatolia at that time, they could at least control Constantinople. The plan was to begin with methodically dismantling organizations within Constantinople and to then slowly advance into Anatolia. The British foreign department was asked to devise a plan to ease this path, and developed the same plan that they had used during the Arab revolt. The aim was to break down authority by separating the Sultan from his government, and working different millets against each other, such as the Christian millet against the Muslim millet, to use the minimum force to achieve their goals.

== Military occupation of Constantinople ==
=== Dissolution of parliament, March 1920 ===
The Telegram House was occupied by Allied troops on 14 March. On the morning of 16 March, British forces, including the British Indian Army, began to occupy the key buildings and arrest nationalist politicians and journalists. A British Indian Army operation, the Şehzadebaşı raid, resulted in 5 Ottoman Army soldiers from the 10th Infantry Division being killed when troops raided their barracks. On 18 March, the Ottoman parliamentarians came together in a last meeting. A black cloth covered the pulpit of the Parliament as reminder of its absent members and the Parliament sent a letter of protest to the Allies, declaring the arrest of five of its members as unacceptable.

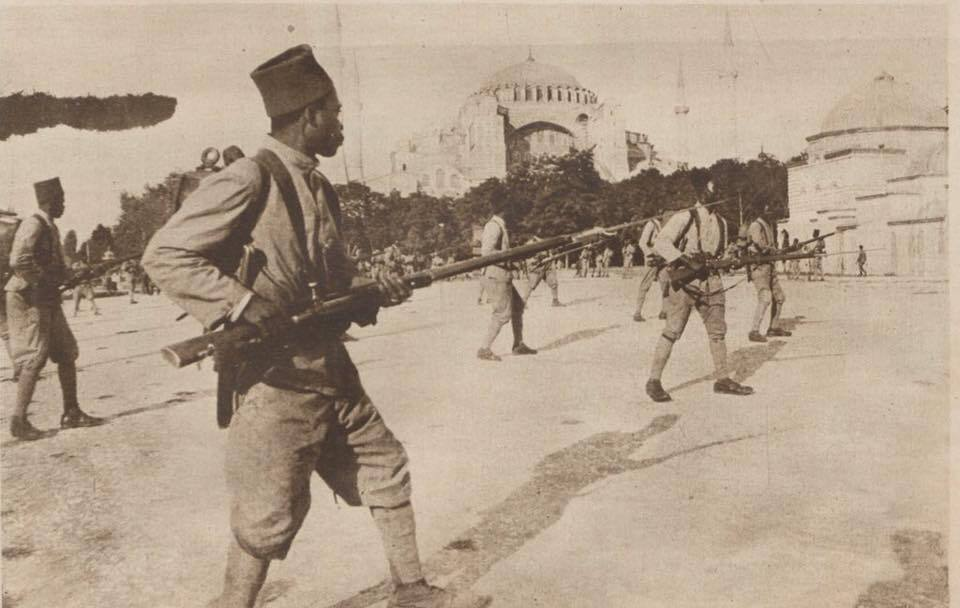
French Senegalese Tirailleurs during Military Drill on Sultanahmet Square in 1919

The dissolution of the Ottoman Parliament left the Sultan as the sole legal authority of the Empire; in line with British aims to isolate the Sultan. Beginning with 18 March, the Sultan followed the directives of the British Foreign Secretary, saying, "There would be no one left to blame for what will be coming soon"; the Sultan revealed his own version of the declaration of dissolution on 11 April, after approximately 150 Turkish politicians accused of war crimes were interned in Malta. The dissolution of the parliament was followed by the raid and closing of the journal Yeni Gün (New Day). Yeni Gün was owned by Yunus Nadi Abalıoğlu, an influential journalist, and was the main media organ in Turkey publishing Turkish news to global audiences.

=== Official declaration, 16 March 1920 ===
On 16 March 1920, the third day of hostilities, the Allied forces declared the occupation:

In an effort to prevent the spread of Turkish nationalism, General Sir George Milne and an Allied force occupied İstanbul.

- The Allies gave assurances that they had no intention of taking over the government.
- The Allies sought to keep the Straits open and to protect the Armenians.
- The Allies persuaded the Ottoman government to denounce the Turkish nationalists and sent many into exile.
- The Sultan had established a Damad Ferid government.

== Enforcing the peace treaty ==
=== Pressure on the insurgency, April–June 1920 ===
The British argued that the insurgency of the Turkish National Movement should be suppressed by local forces in Anatolia, with the help of British training and arms. In response to a formal British request, the government in Constantinople appointed an Anatolian general inspector Süleyman Şefik Pasha and a new Security Army, Kuva-i Inzibatiye, to enforce central government control with British support. The British also supported local guerrilla groups in the Anatolian heartland (officially called 'independent armies') with money and arms.

Despite this, combined attempts by British and local forces proved unsuccessful in quelling the nationalist movement. A clash outside İzmit quickly escalated, with British forces opening fire on the nationalists, and bombing them from the air. Although the attack forced the nationalists to retreat, the weakness of the British position had been made apparent. The British commander, General George Milne, asked for reinforcements of at least twenty-seven divisions. The British were unwilling to agree to a deployment of this size, as it could have political consequences that were beyond the British government's capacity to handle.

Some Circassian exiles, who had emigrated to the Empire after the Circassian genocide may have supported the British—notably Ahmet Anzavur, who led the Kuva-i Inzibatiye and ravaged the countryside. Others, such as Hüseyin Rauf Orbay, who was of Ubykh descent, remained loyal to Kemal, and was exiled to Malta in 1920 when British forces took the city. The British were quick to accept the fact that the nationalistic movement, which had solidified during World War I, could not be faced without the deployment of reliable and well-trained forces. On 25 June the Kuva-i Inzibatiye was dismantled on the advice of the British, as they were becoming a liability.

=== Presentation of the treaty to the Sultan, June 1920 ===
The treaty terms were presented to the Sultan in the middle of June. The treaty was harsher than the Ottomans expected; because of the military pressure placed on the insurgency from April to June 1920, the Allies did not expect that there would be any serious opposition.

Concurrently, Kemal had set up a rival government in Ankara, the Grand National Assembly of Turkey. On 18 October, the government of Damat Ferid Pasha was replaced by a provisional ministry under Ahmed Tevfik Pasha as Grand Vizier, who announced the intention to convoke the Senate for the purpose of ratification of the Treaty, provided that national unity be achieved. This required seeking cooperation with Kemal. The latter expressed disdain to the Treaty and started a military assault. As a result, the Turkish Government issued a note to the Entente that the ratification of the Treaty was impossible at that time.

== End of occupation ==
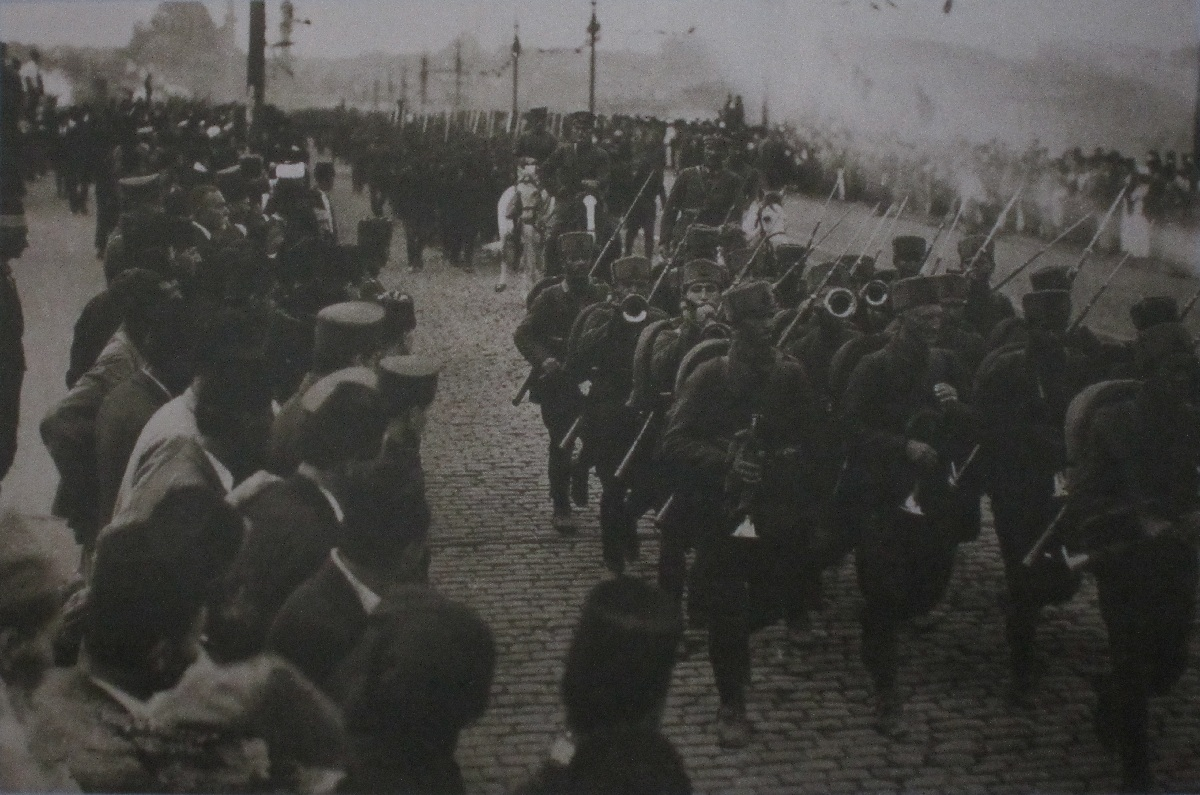
Turkish troops enter Istanbul on 6 October 1923.

The success of the Turkish National Movement against the French and Greeks was followed by their forces threatening the Allied forces at Chanak. The British decided to resist any attempt to penetrate the neutral zone of the Straits. Kemal was persuaded by the French to order his forces to avoid any incident at Chanak. Nevertheless, the Chanak Crisis nearly resulted in hostilities, these being avoided on 11 October 1922, when the Armistice of Mudanya was signed, bringing the Turkish War of Independence to an end. The handling of this crisis caused the collapse of David Lloyd George's Ministry on 19 October 1922.

Following the Turkish War of Independence (1919–1922), the Grand National Assembly of Turkey in Ankara abolished the Sultanate on 1 November 1922, and the last Ottoman Sultan, Mehmed VI, was expelled from the city. Leaving aboard the British warship HMS Malaya on 17 November 1922, he went into exile and died in Sanremo, Italy, on 16 May 1926.

Negotiations for a new peace treaty with Turkey began at the Conference of Lausanne on 20 November 1922 and reopened after a break on 23 April 1923. This led to the signing of the Treaty of Lausanne on 24 July 1923. Under the terms of the treaty, Allied forces started evacuating Istanbul on 23 August 1923 and completed the task on 4 October 1923 – British, Italian, and French troops departing pari passu.

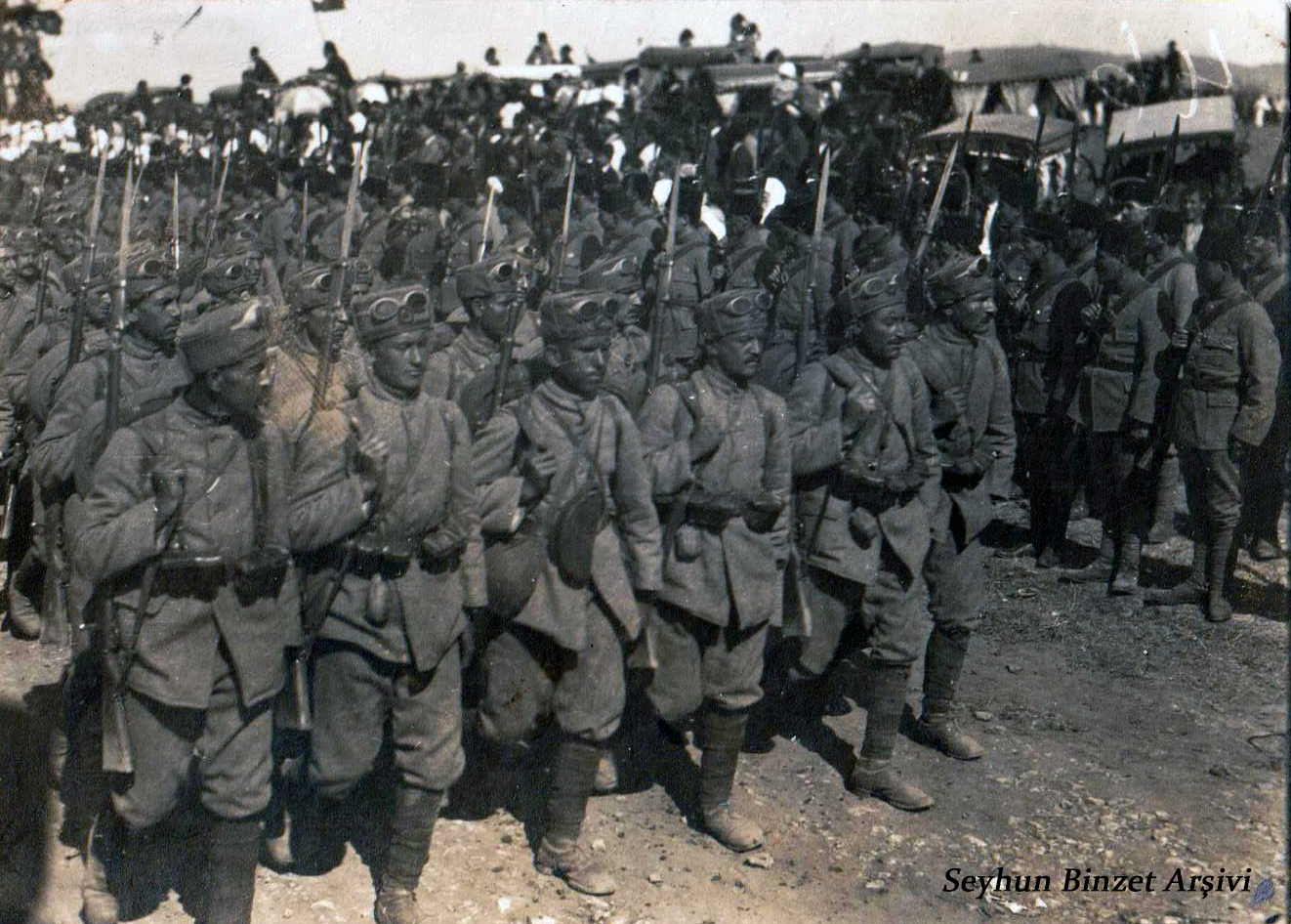
Turkish troops enter Kadıköy on 6 October 1923.

Turkish forces of the Ankara government, commanded by Şükrü Naili Pasha (3rd Corps), entered the city with a ceremony on 6 October 1923, which has been marked as the Liberation Day of Istanbul (Turkish: İstanbul'un Kurtuluşu) and is commemorated every year on its anniversary. On 29 October 1923, the Grand National Assembly of Turkey declared the establishment of the Turkish Republic, with Ankara as its capital. Mustafa Kemal Atatürk became the Republic's first President.

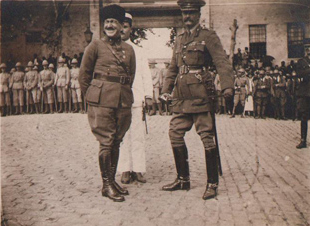
General Charles Harington with Commander Selahattin Adil in İstanbul

== List of Allied High Commissioners ==
United Kingdom:

- November 1918 – 1919: Admiral Somerset Arthur Gough-Calthorpe, also Commander-in-Chief, Mediterranean Fleet
- August 1919 – 1920: Admiral John de Robeck, also Commander-in-Chief, Mediterranean Fleet
- 1920 – 22 October 1923: Sir Horace Rumbold (later British ambassador)

France:

- November 1918 – January 1919: General Louis Franchet d'Esperey
- 30 January 1919 – December 1920: Albert Defrance
- 1921 – 22 October 1923: General Maurice Pellé

Italy:

- November 1918 – January 1919: Carlo Sforza
- September 1920 – 22 October 1923: Camillo Garroni

Greece:

- 1918–1921: Efthimios Kanellopoulos
- 1921–1923: Charalambos Simopoulos

United States:

- August 1919–October 1923: Admiral Mark Lambert Bristol

Japan:

- April 1921–October 1923: Sadatsuchi Uchida (Note: It has been argued that the United States and Japan had more of a symbolic presence in Istanbul and were there more as observers than occupiers.)

== See also ==
- Occupation of Smyrna
- Partition of the Ottoman Empire
