= Partition of the Ottoman Empire =

Division of Ottoman territory after World War I

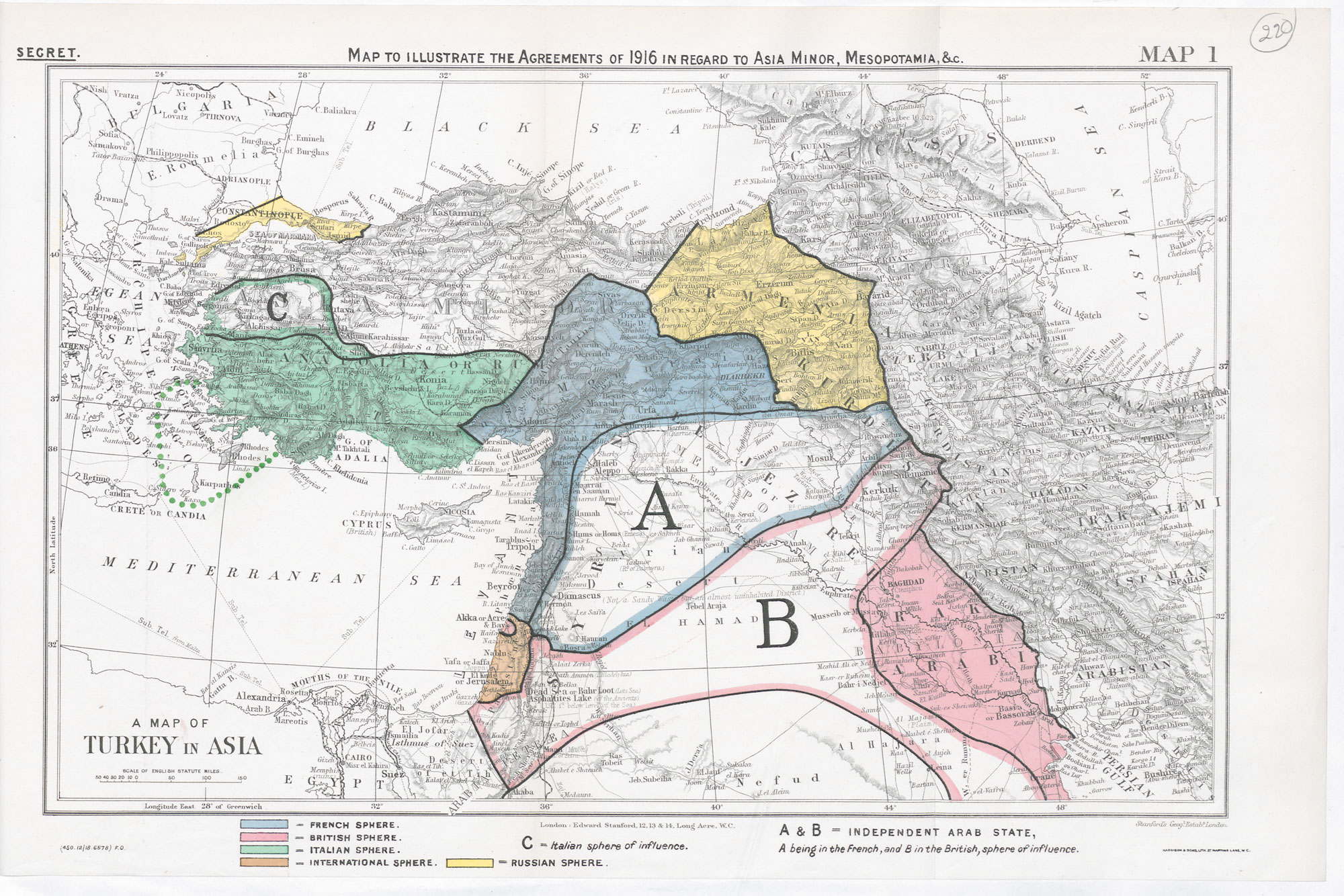
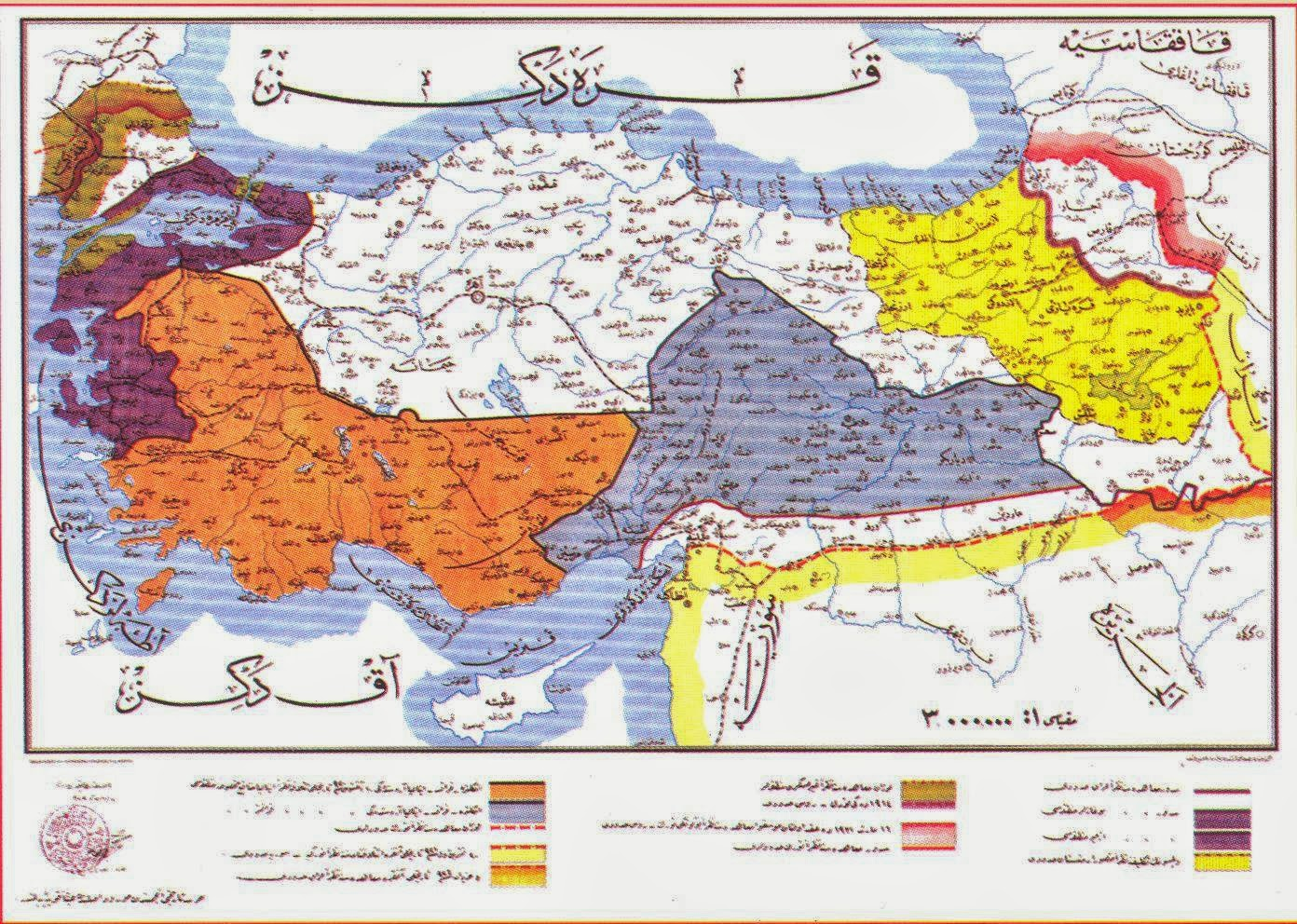
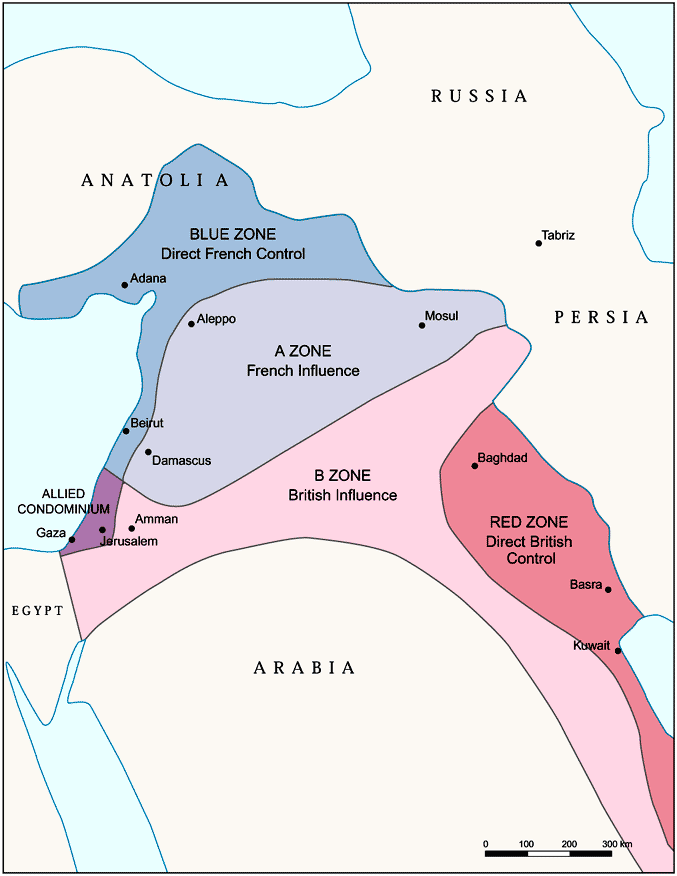
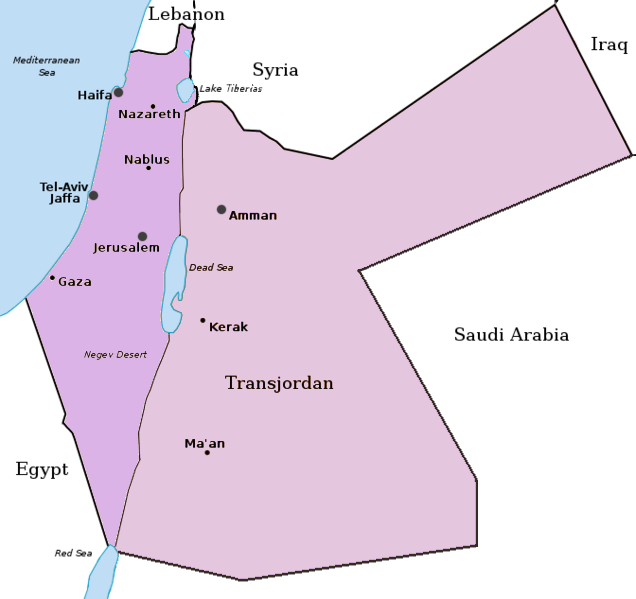
British Foreign Office memorandum, 1927 version of the Treaty of Sèvres, Sykes–Picot agreement, Mandate for Syria and the Lebanon, Mandatory Palestine, and the Emirate of Transjordan

The partition of the Ottoman Empire (30 October 1918 – 1 November 1922) was a geopolitical event that occurred after World War I and the occupation of Constantinople by British, French, and Italian troops in November 1918. The partitioning was planned in several agreements made by the Allied Powers early in the course of World War I, notably the Sykes–Picot Agreement, after the Ottoman Empire had joined Germany to form the Ottoman–German alliance. The huge conglomeration of territories and peoples that formerly comprised the Ottoman Empire was divided into several new states. The Ottoman Empire had been the leading Islamic state in geopolitical, cultural, and ideological terms. The partitioning of the Ottoman Empire after the war led to the domination of the Middle East by Christian Western powers such as Italy, Britain, and France, and saw the creation of the modern Arab world and the Republic of Turkey. Resistance to the influence of these powers came from the Turkish National Movement but did not become widespread in the other post-Ottoman states until the period of rapid decolonization after World War II.

The League of Nations mandate granted the French Mandate for Syria and the Lebanon, the British Mandate for Mesopotamia (later Iraq) and the British Mandate for Palestine, later divided into Mandatory Palestine and the Emirate of Transjordan (1921–1946). The Ottoman Empire's possessions in the Arabian Peninsula became the Kingdom of Hejaz, which the Sultanate of Nejd (today Saudi Arabia) was allowed to annex, and the Mutawakkilite Kingdom of Yemen. The Empire's possessions on the western shores of the Persian Gulf were variously annexed by Saudi Arabia (al-Ahsa and Qatif), or remained British protectorates (Kuwait, Bahrain, and Qatar) and became the Arab States of the Persian Gulf.

After the Ottoman government collapsed completely, its representatives signed the Treaty of Sèvres in 1920, which would have partitioned much of the territory of present-day Turkey among France, the United Kingdom, Greece, and Italy. The Turkish War of Independence forced the Western European powers to return to the negotiating table before the treaty could be ratified. The Western Europeans and the Grand National Assembly of Turkey signed and ratified the new Treaty of Lausanne in 1923, superseding the Treaty of Sèvres and agreeing on most of the territorial issues.

One unresolved issue, the dispute between the Kingdom of Iraq and the Republic of Turkey over the former province of Mosul, was later negotiated under the auspices of the League of Nations in 1926. The British and French partitioned the region of Syria between them in the Sykes-Picot Agreement. Other secret agreements were concluded with Italy and Russia. The international Zionist movement, after their successful lobbying for the Balfour Declaration, encouraged the push for a Jewish homeland in Palestine. While a part of the Triple Entente, Russia also had wartime agreements preventing it from participating in the partitioning of the Ottoman Empire after the Russian Revolution. The Treaty of Sèvres formally acknowledged the new League of Nations mandates in the region, the independence of Yemen, and British sovereignty over Cyprus.

== Background ==
The Western powers had long believed that they would eventually become dominant in the area claimed by the weak central government of the Ottoman Empire. Britain anticipated a need to secure the area because of its strategic position on the route to Colonial India and perceived itself as locked in a struggle with Russia for imperial influence known as the Great Game. These powers disagreed over their contradictory post-war aims and made several dual and triple agreements.

== French Mandates ==
Syria and Lebanon became a French League of Nations Mandate. French control was met immediately with armed resistance, and, to combat Arab nationalism, France divided the Mandate area into Lebanon and four sub-states.

=== Mandate of Syria ===
Compared to the mandate of Lebanon, the situation in Syria was more chaotic. The entities stated below are the ones that were united.

- Syrian Federation: Included State of Damascus, Alawite State, and State of Aleppo (including Sanjak of Alexandretta), which were the former territorial components of the briefly existing Arab Kingdom of Syria.
- State of Syria (1925–1930): Successor to the Syrian Federation era (Not including the Alawite State).
- First Syrian Republic: State of Syria (1925–1930) with the territories of Jabal Druze State and Alawite State incorporated (Hatay State later merged with Turkey).

=== Mandate of Lebanon ===
Greater Lebanon was the name of a territory created by France. It was the precursor of modern Lebanon. It existed between 1 September 1920 and 23 May 1926. France carved its territory from the Levantine landmass (mandated by the League of Nations) to create a "haven" for the Maronite Christian population. Maronites gained self-rule and secured their position in independent Lebanon in 1943.

French intervention on behalf of the Maronites had begun with the capitulations of the Ottoman Empire, agreements made during the 16th to the 19th centuries. In 1866, when Youssef Bey Karam led a Maronite uprising in Mount Lebanon, a French-led naval force arrived to help, making threats against the governor, Dawood Pasha, at the Sultan's Porte and later removing Karam to safety.

== British Mandates ==
The British secured three territorial mandates, with one of Sharif Hussein's sons, Faisal, installed as King of Iraq and Transjordan providing a throne for another of Hussein's sons, Abdullah. Mandatory Palestine was placed under direct British administration, and the Jewish population was allowed to increase, initially under British protection. Most of the Arabian peninsula fell to another British ally, Ibn Saud, who created the Kingdom of Saudi Arabia in 1932.

=== Mandate for Mesopotamia ===
Mosul was allocated to France under the 1916 Sykes-Picot Agreement and was subsequently given to Britain under the 1918 Clemenceau–Lloyd George Agreement. Great Britain and Turkey disputed control of the former Ottoman province of Mosul in the 1920s. Under the 1923 Treaty of Lausanne Mosul fell under the British Mandate of Mesopotamia, but the new Turkish republic claimed the province as part of its historic heartland.

A three-person League of Nations committee went to the region in 1924 to study the case. In 1925 they recommended the region remain connected to Iraq, and that the UK should hold the mandate for another 25 years, to assure the autonomous rights of the Kurdish population. Turkey rejected this decision. Britain, Iraq and Turkey made a treaty on 5 June 1926, that mostly followed the decision of the League Council. Mosul stayed under British Mandate of Mesopotamia until Iraq was granted independence in 1932 by the urging of King Faisal, though the British retained military bases and transit rights for their forces in the country per the Anglo-Iraqi Treaty of 1930.

=== Mandate for Palestine ===
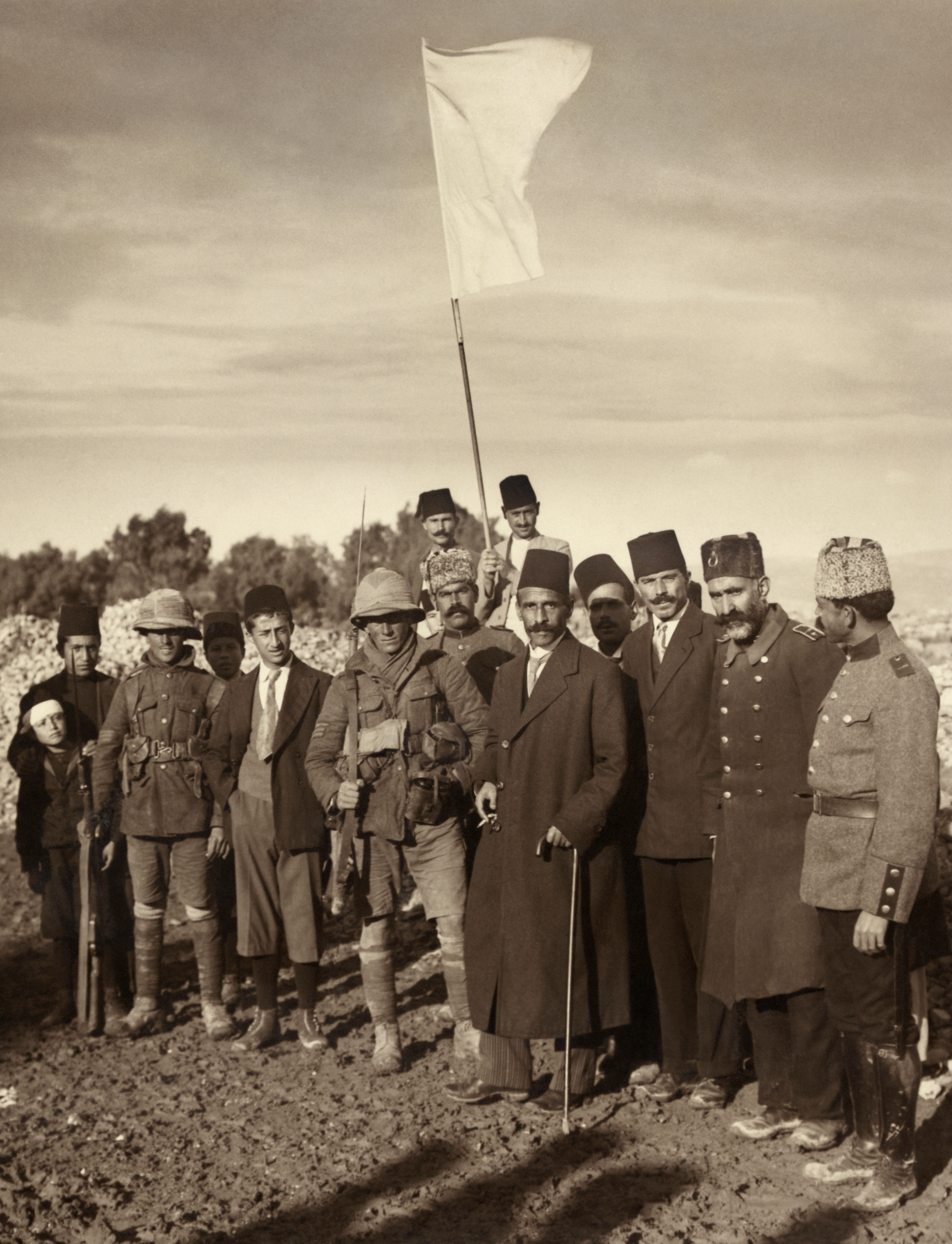
The surrender of Jerusalem to the British on 9 December 1917 after the Battle of Jerusalem

During the Great War, Britain produced three contrasting, but feasibly compatible, statements regarding their ambitions for Palestine. Britain had supported, through British intelligence officer T. E. Lawrence (aka Lawrence of Arabia), the establishment of a united Arab state covering a large area of the Arab Middle East in exchange for Arab support of the British during the war. The Balfour Declaration of 1917 encouraged Jewish ambitions for a national home. Lastly, the British promised via the McMahon–Hussein correspondence that the Hashemite family would have lordship over most land in the region in return for their support in the Arab Revolt.

The Arab Revolt, which was in part orchestrated by Lawrence, resulted in British forces under General Edmund Allenby defeating the Ottoman forces in 1917 in the Sinai and Palestine campaign and occupying Palestine and Syria. The land was administered by the British for the remainder of the war.

The United Kingdom was granted control of Palestine by the Paris Peace Conference which established the League of Nations in 1919. Herbert Samuel, a former Postmaster General in the British cabinet who was instrumental in drafting the Balfour Declaration, was appointed the first High Commissioner in Palestine. In 1920, at the San Remo conference in Italy, the League of Nations mandate over Palestine was assigned to Britain. In 1923, Britain transferred a part of the Golan Heights to the French Mandate of Syria, in exchange for the Metula region.

== Independence movements and occupations ==
When the Ottomans departed, the Arabs proclaimed an independent state in Damascus, but were too weak, militarily and economically, to resist the European powers for long, and Britain and France soon re-established control.

During the 1920s and 1930s Iraq, Syria, and Egypt moved towards independence, although the British and French did not formally depart the region until after World War II. But in Palestine, the conflicting forces of Arab nationalism and Zionism created a situation from which the British could neither resolve nor extricate themselves. The rise to power of Nazism in Germany created a new urgency in the Zionist quest to create a Jewish state in Palestine, leading to the Israeli–Palestinian conflict.

=== Arabian Peninsula ===
On the Arabian Peninsula, the Arabs were able to establish several independent states. In 1916, Hussein bin Ali, Sharif of Mecca, established the Kingdom of Hejaz, while the Emirate of Riyadh was transformed into the Sultanate of Nejd. In 1926, the Kingdom of Nejd and Hejaz was formed, which in 1932 became the Kingdom of Saudi Arabia. The Mutawakkilite Kingdom of Yemen became independent in 1918, while the Arab States of the Persian Gulf became de facto British protectorates, with some internal autonomy.

=== Anatolia ===
The Russians, British, Italians, French, Greeks, Assyrians, and Armenians all made claims to Anatolia, based on a collection of wartime promises, military actions, secret agreements, and treaties. According to the Treaty of Sèvres, all but the Assyrians would have had their wishes honoured. Armenia was to be given a significant portion of the east, known as Wilsonian Armenia, extending as far down as the Lake Van area and as far west as Mush.

Greece was to be given Smyrna and the area around it, and likely would have gained Constantinople and all of Thrace, which was administered as internationally controlled and demilitarized territory. Italy was to be given control over the south-central and western coast of Anatolia around Antalya. France was to be given the area of Cilicia. Britain was to be given all the area south of Armenia. The Treaty of Lausanne, by contrast, forfeited all arrangements and territorial annexations.

=== Russia ===
In March 1915, Foreign Minister of the Russian Empire, Sergey Sazonov, told British and French Ambassadors George Buchanan and Maurice Paléologue that a lasting postwar settlement demanded Russian possession of "the city of Constantinople, the western shore of the Bosporus, Sea of Marmara, and Dardanelles, as well as southern Thrace up to the Enos-Media line", and "a part of the Asiatic coast between the Bosporus, the Sakarya River, and a point to be determined on the shore of the Bay of İzmit."

The Constantinople Agreement was made public by the Russian newspaper Izvestiya in November 1917, to gain the support of the Armenian public for the Russian Revolution. The revolution effectively ended the Russian plans.

=== United Kingdom ===
The British seeking control over the straits of Marmara led to the Occupation of Constantinople, with French and Italian assistance, from 13 November 1918 to 23 September 1923. After the Turkish War of Independence and the signing of the Treaty of Lausanne, the troops left the city.

=== Italy ===
Under the 1917 Agreement of Saint-Jean-de-Maurienne between France, Italy, and the United Kingdom, Italy was to receive all southwestern Anatolia except the Adana region, including İzmir. However, in 1919 the Greek Prime Minister Eleftherios Venizelos obtained the permission of the Paris Peace Conference to occupy İzmir, overriding the provisions of the agreement.

=== France ===
Under the secret Sykes–Picot Agreement of 1916, the French obtained Hatay, Lebanon and Syria and expressed a desire for the part of South-Eastern Anatolia. The 1917 Agreement of St. Jean-de-Maurienne between France, Italy and the United Kingdom allotted France the Adana region.

The French army, along with the British, occupied parts of Anatolia from 1919 to 1921 in the Franco-Turkish War, including coal mines, railways, the Black Sea ports of Zonguldak, Karadeniz Ereğli, and Constantinople, Uzunköprü in Eastern Thrace, and the region of Cilicia. France eventually withdrew from all these areas, after the Armistice of Mudanya, the Treaty of Ankara, and the Treaty of Lausanne.

=== Greece ===
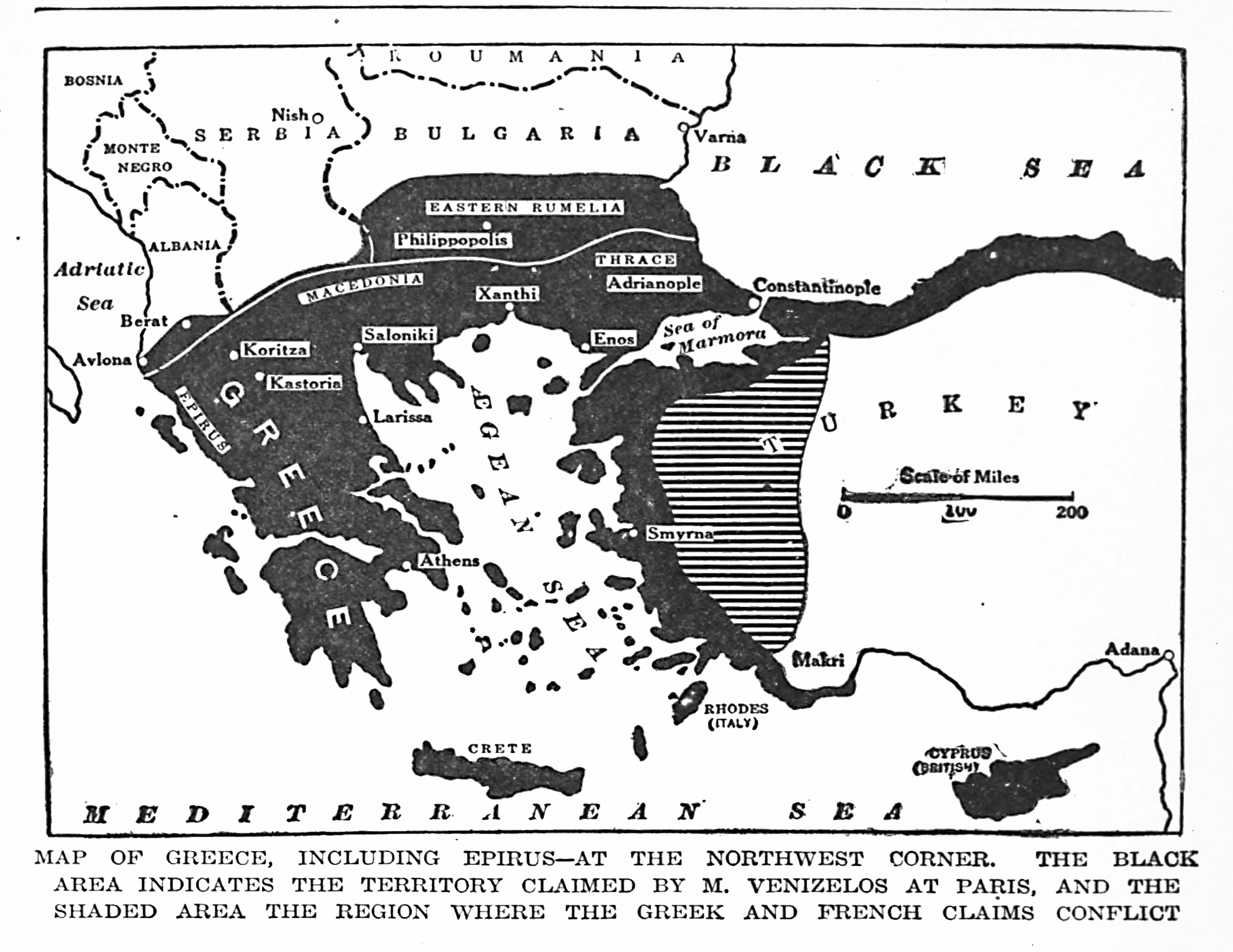
The Greek proposal to the Paris Peace Conference

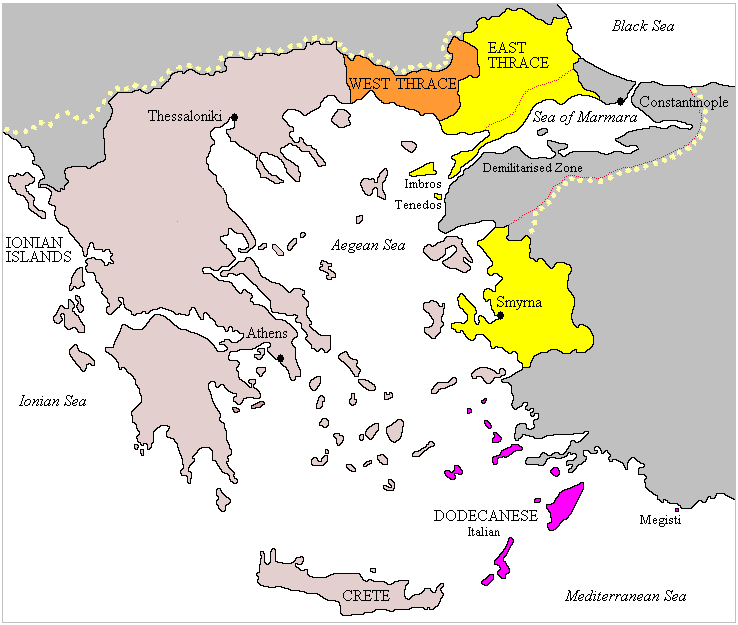
Greece according to the Treaty of Sèvres

The western Allies, particularly British Prime Minister David Lloyd George, promised Greece territorial gains at the expense of the Ottoman Empire if Greece entered the war on the Allied side. The promised territories included eastern Thrace, the islands of Imbros (Gökçeada) and Tenedos (Bozcaada), and parts of western Anatolia around the city of İzmir.

In May 1917, after the exile of Constantine I of Greece, Greek prime minister Eleuthérios Venizélos returned to Athens and allied with the Entente. Greek military forces (though divided between supporters of the monarchy and supporters of Venizélos) began to take part in military operations against the Bulgarian army on the border. That same year, İzmir was promised to Italy under the Agreement of Saint-Jean-de-Maurienne between France, Italy and the United Kingdom.

At the 1918 Paris Peace Conference, based on the wartime promises, Venizélos lobbied hard for an expanded Hellas (the Megali Idea) that would include the small Greek-speaking community in far Southern Albania, the Orthodox Greek-speaking community in Thrace (including Constantinople) and the Orthodox community in Asia Minor. In 1919, despite Italian opposition, he obtained the permission of the Paris Peace Conference of 1919 for Greece to occupy İzmir.

=== South West Caucasian Republic ===
The South West Caucasian Republic was an entity established on Russian territory in 1918, after the withdrawal of Ottoman troops to the pre-World War I border as a result of the Armistice of Mudros. It had a nominally independent provisional government headed by Fakhr al-Din Pirioghlu and based in Kars.

After fighting broke out between it and both Georgia and Armenia, British High Commissioner Admiral Somerset Arthur Gough-Calthorpe occupied Kars on 19 April 1919, abolishing its parliament and arresting 30 members of its government. He placed Kars province under Armenian rule.

=== Armenia ===
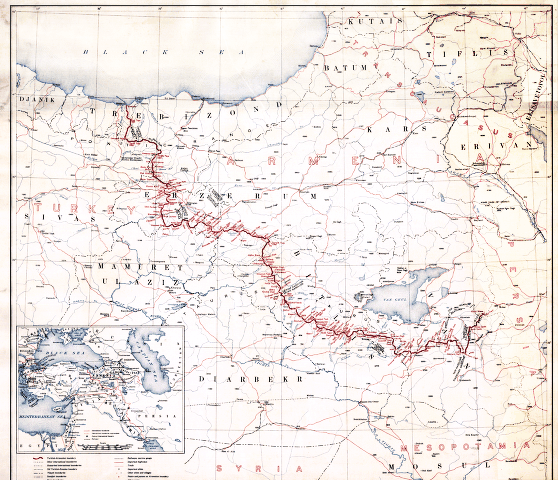
Wilsonian Armenia according to the Treaty of Sèvres

In the later years of World War I, the Armenians in Russia established a provisional government in the south-west of the Russian Empire. Military conflicts between the Turks and Armenians both during and after the war eventually determined the borders of the state of Armenia. Cilician Armenians established the Republic of "Autonomous Armenia" in Cilicia under French protection, but the French later abandoned the project.

==== Administration for Western Armenia ====
In April 1915, Russia supported the establishment of the Armenian provisional government under Russian-Armenian Governor Aram Manukian, leader of the resistance in the Defense of Van. The Armenian national liberation movement hoped that Armenia could be liberated from the Ottoman regime in exchange for helping the Russian army. However, the Tsarist regime had a secret wartime agreement with the other members of the Triple Entente about the eventual fate of several Anatolian territories, named the Sykes–Picot Agreement. These plans were made public by the Armenian revolutionaries in 1917 to gain the support of the Armenian public.

In the meantime, the provisional government was becoming more stable as more Armenians were moving into its territory. In 1917, 150,000 Armenians relocated to the provinces of Erzurum, Bitlis, Muş, and Van. Armen Garo (known as Karekin Pastirmaciyan) and other Armenian leaders asked for the Armenian regulars in the European theatre to be transferred to the Caucasian front.

The Russian revolution left the front in eastern Turkey in a state of flux. In December 1917, a truce was signed by representatives of the Ottoman Empire and the Transcaucasian Commissariat. However, the Ottoman Empire began to reinforce its Third Army on the eastern front. Fighting began in mid-February 1918. Armenians, under heavy pressure from the Ottoman army and Kurdish irregulars, were forced to withdraw from Erzincan to Erzurum and then to Kars, eventually evacuating even Kars on 25 April. As a response to the Ottoman advances, the Transcaucasian Commissariat evolved into the short-lived Transcaucasian Federation; its disintegration resulted in Armenians forming the Democratic Republic of Armenia on 30 May 1918. The Treaty of Batum, signed on 4 June, reduced the Armenian republic to an area of only 11,000 km^{2}.

==== Wilsonian Armenia ====
At the Paris Peace Conference, the Armenian diaspora and the Armenian Revolutionary Federation argued that Historical Armenia, the region which had remained outside the control of the Ottoman Empire from 1915 to 1918, should be part of the Democratic Republic of Armenia. Arguing from the principles in Woodrow Wilson's "Fourteen Points" speech, the Armenian Diaspora argued Armenia had "the ability to control the region", based on the Armenian control established after the Russian Revolution. The Armenians argued that the dominant population of the region was becoming more Armenian as Turkish inhabitants were moving to the western provinces.

Boghos Nubar, the president of the Armenian National Delegation, added: "In the Caucasus, where, without mentioning the 150,000 Armenians in the Imperial Russian Army, more than 40,000 of their volunteers contributed to the liberation of a portion of the Armenian vilayets, and where, under the command of their leaders, Antranik and Nazerbekoff, they, alone among the peoples of the Caucasus, offered resistance to the Turkish armies, from the beginning of the Bolshevist withdrawal right up to the signing of an armistice."

President Wilson accepted the Armenian arguments for drawing the frontier and wrote: "The world expects of them (the Armenians), that they give every encouragement and help within their power to those Turkish refugees who may desire to return to their former homes in the districts of Trebizond, Erzerum, Van, and Bitlis remembering that these peoples, too, have suffered greatly." The conference agreed with his suggestion that the Democratic Republic of Armenia should expand into present-day eastern Turkey.

=== Georgia ===
After the fall of the Russian Empire, Georgia became an independent republic and sought to maintain control of Batumi as well as Ardahan, Artvin, and Oltu, the areas with Muslim Georgian elements, which had been acquired by Russia from the Ottomans in 1878. The Ottoman forces occupied the disputed territories by June 1918, forcing Georgia to sign the Treaty of Batum.

After the demise of the Ottoman power, Georgia regained Ardahan and Artvin from local Muslim militias in 1919 and Batum from the British administration of that maritime city in 1920. It claimed but never attempted to control Oltu, which was also contested by Armenia. Between February and March 1921, both Soviet Russia and Turkey launched an invasion on the new Georgian Republic, leading to new territorial rearrangements finalized in the Treaty of Kars, by which Batumi remained within the borders of a Sovietized Georgia, while Ardahan and Artvin were recognized as parts of Turkey.

=== Republic of Turkey ===
Between 1918 and 1923, Turkish resistance movements led by Mustafa Kemal Atatürk forced the Greeks, Armenians, and Italy out of Anatolia. The Turkish nationalists also suppressed Kurdish attempts to become independent in the 1920s. After the Turkish National Movement gained control over Anatolia, there was no hope of meeting the conditions of the Treaty of Sèvres.

Before joining the Soviet Union, the Democratic Republic of Armenia signed the Treaty of Alexandropol, on 3 December 1920, agreeing to the current border between the two countries, though the Armenian government had already collapsed due to a concurrent Soviet invasion on 2 December. Afterwards Armenia became an integral part of the Soviet Union. This border was ratified again with the Treaty of Moscow (1921), in which the Bolsheviks ceded the already Turkish-occupied provinces of Kars, Iğdır, Ardahan, and Artvin to Turkey in exchange for the Adjara region with its capital city of Batumi.

Turkey and the newly formed Soviet Union, along with the Armenian Soviet Socialist Republic and Georgian Soviet Socialist Republic, ratified the Treaty of Kars on 11 September 1922, establishing the north-eastern border of Turkey and bringing peace to the region, despite none of them being internationally recognized at the time. Finally, the Treaty of Lausanne, signed in 1923, formally ended all hostilities and led to the creation of the modern Turkish Republic.

== See also ==
- Abolition of the Ottoman sultanate
- Dissolution of the Ottoman Empire

== Notes ==
=== Bibliography ===
- Fromkin, David (1989). A Peace to End All Peace: Creating the Modern Middle East, 1914–1922. New York: H. Holt. ISBN 978-0-8050-0857-9.
- Quilliam, Neil (1999). Syria and the New World Order. Reading, UK: Ithaca Press. ISBN 978-0-86372-249-3.
