= Yıldıztepe Military Cemetery =

Cemetery in Urla, İzmir Province, Turkey

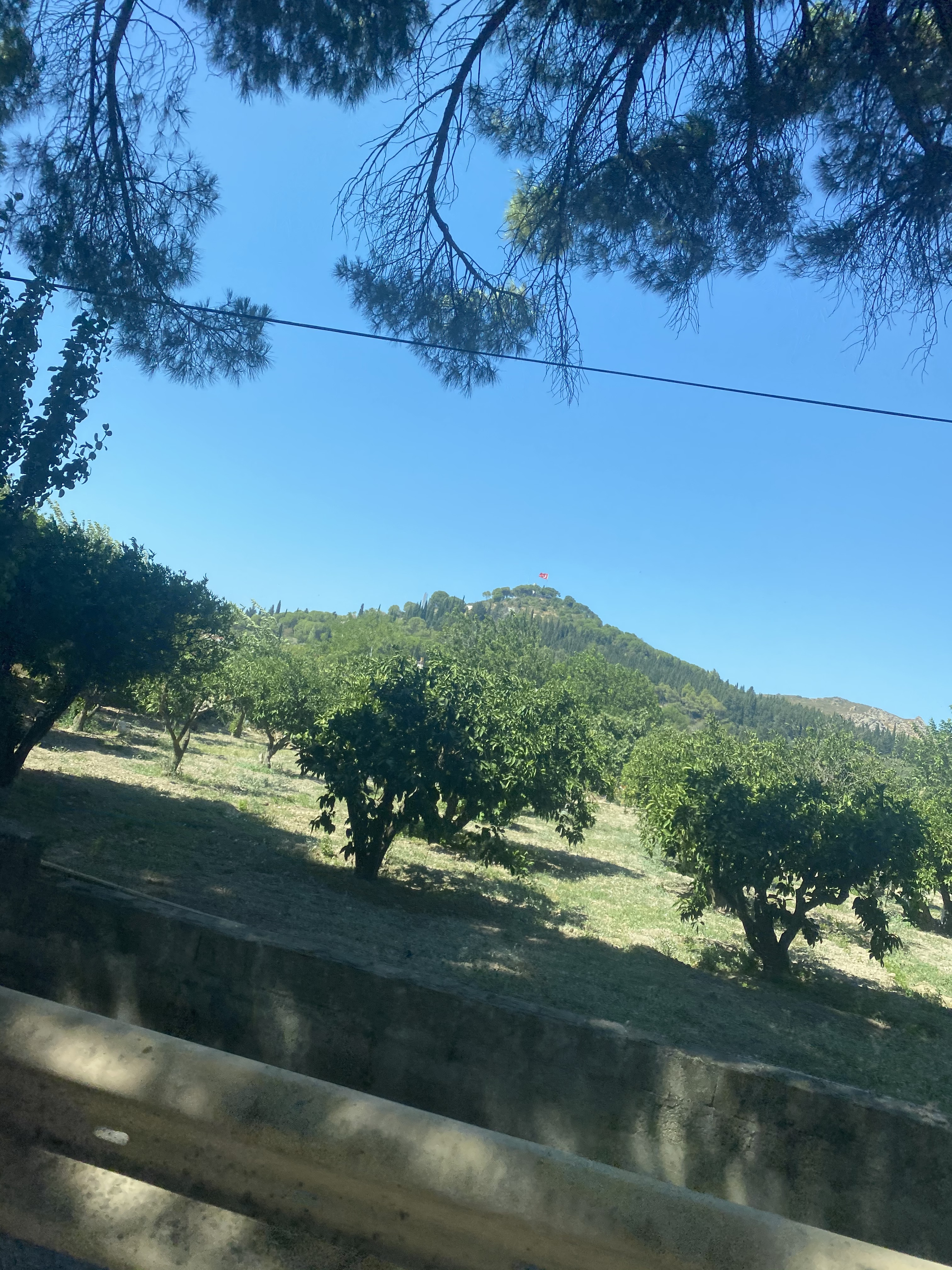
- Interactive map of Yıldıztepe Military Cemetery

Details
- Established: 1965
- Location: İskele, Urla, İzmir Province
- Country: Turkey
- Coordinates: 38.35406°N 26.76439°E
- Size: 2,500 m^{2} (27,000 sq ft)
- No. of graves: 2

The Yıldıztepe Military Cemetery is a military cemetery in town İskele of Urla, İzmir Province in Turkey.

== History ==
The cemetery was established in 1965 for Captain Kemal Bey and Corporal Baki, both soldiers who died in Urla during the Great Offensive of 1922 due to a Greek artillery. The cemetery was renovated in 2009.

== Burials ==
=== Captain Kemal Bey ===
After graduating from school, Kemal Bey immediately volunteered to fight for the Ottoman army in the Balkan Wars. He survived the Balkan Wars, but was injured when he joined the army in 1915 and fought in against Australian and New Zealand's forces during the Landing at Anzac Cove.

In the Turkish War of Independence, Kemal Bey fought in two fronts. He participated in the battles of Urfa and Aintab in the Franco-Turkish war in the south and attended the Great Offensive in the Greco-Turkish war in the west. He was killed by a Greek artillery in Urla on 11 September 1922.

=== Corporal Baki ===
There is little to no information about military career of Baki, however it's known that he attended Great Offensive in 1922 and was killed by a Greek artillery in Urla on 11 September 1922.
