= Monastir Military High School =

- Manastır Askerî İdadisi

Location
- Monastir, Monastir Vilayet, Ottoman Empire; 41.012569°N 21.200838°E

Information
- Established: 1847
- Closed: 1934
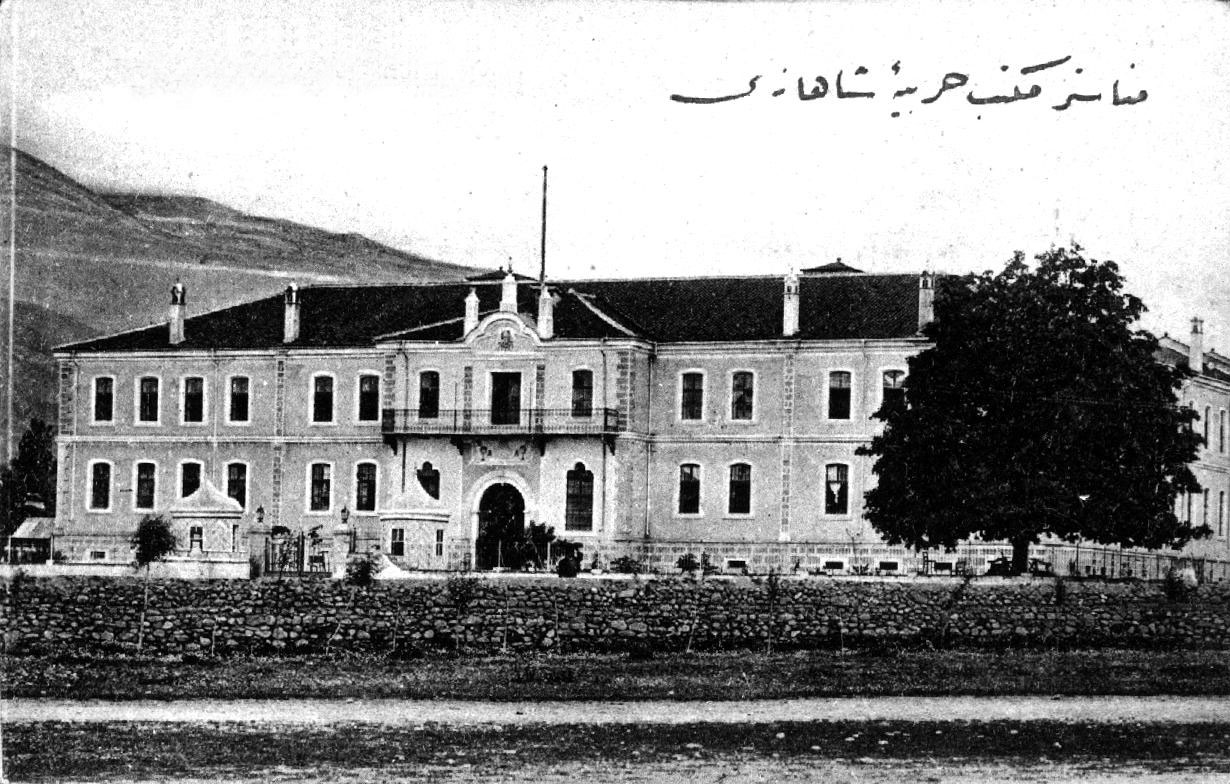
- Monastir Military High School

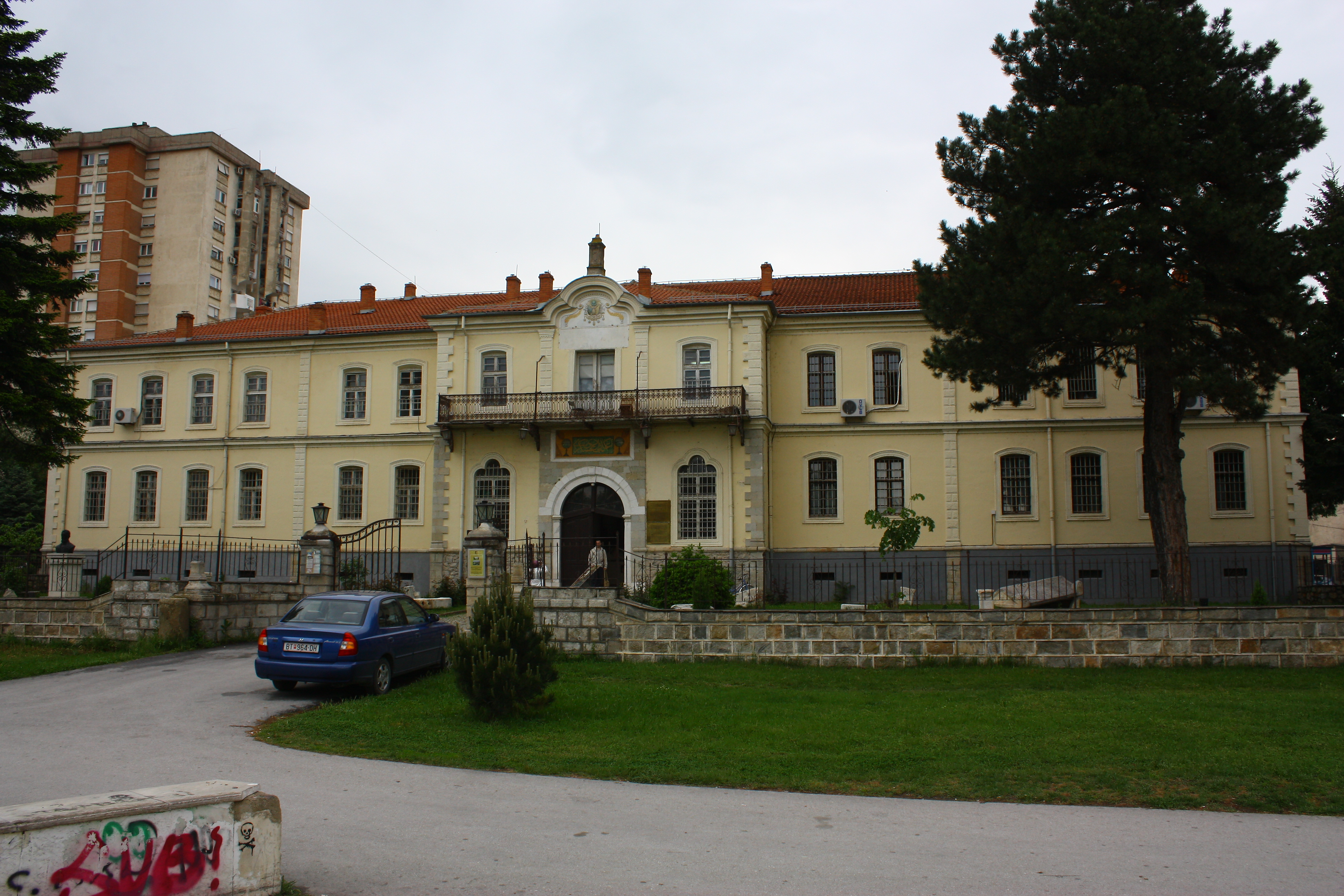
- The building is now home to the Museum and Institute Bitola

The Monastir Military High School (Manastır Askerî İdadisi), established in 1847, was one of the three-year educational military high schools of the Ottoman Empire. It was located in Monastir (present day Bitola, North Macedonia). The buildings of the school have been used as museums since 1934 (today NI Institute and Museum Bitola).

The other military high schools of the Ottoman Empire were: Constantinople Military High School (Kuleli Military High School) and Bursa Military High School, both founded in 1846; the Edirne Military High School founded in 1847; the Damascus Military High School, founded in 1848; the Erzurum Military High School, founded in 1873; and the Baghdad Military High School, founded in 1876.

== Notable alumni ==
- Mustafa Kemal Atatürk (1881–1938), the founder of modern Turkey, who attended from 1896 to 1898
- Ahmed Niyazi Bey (1873–1912), a leader of the 1908 Young Turk Revolution
- Bekir Fikri (1882–1914), military officer
- Hüseyin Avni Zaimler (1877–1930), military officer and MP in the Grand National Assembly of Turkey
- Fethi Okyar (1880–1943), second Prime Minister of Turkey
- Fuat Bulca (1881–1962), military officer and MP in the Grand National Assembly of Turkey
- Salih Bozok (1881–1941), military officer and MP in the Grand National Assembly of Turkey
- Nuri Conker (1882–1937), military officer and MP in the Grand National Assembly of Turkey
- Hüsrev Gerede (1884–1962), military officer and MP in the Grand National Assembly of Turkey
- Cevat Abbas Gürer (1887–1943), military officer and MP in the Grand National Assembly of Turkey
- Ali Shefqet Shkupi, military officer and first Chief of Supreme Staff of the Albanian Army

== See also ==
- Education in the Ottoman Empire
