= Gürer =

Gürer (IPA: [gyˈraʃ], literally "strong (gür) man (er)") is a Turkish surname and male given name and may refer to:

- Cevat Abbas Gürer (1887–1943), Turkish actress and singer
- Gürer Aykal (born 1942), Turkish conductor
