= List of recipients of the Medal of Independence with Red-Green Ribbon =

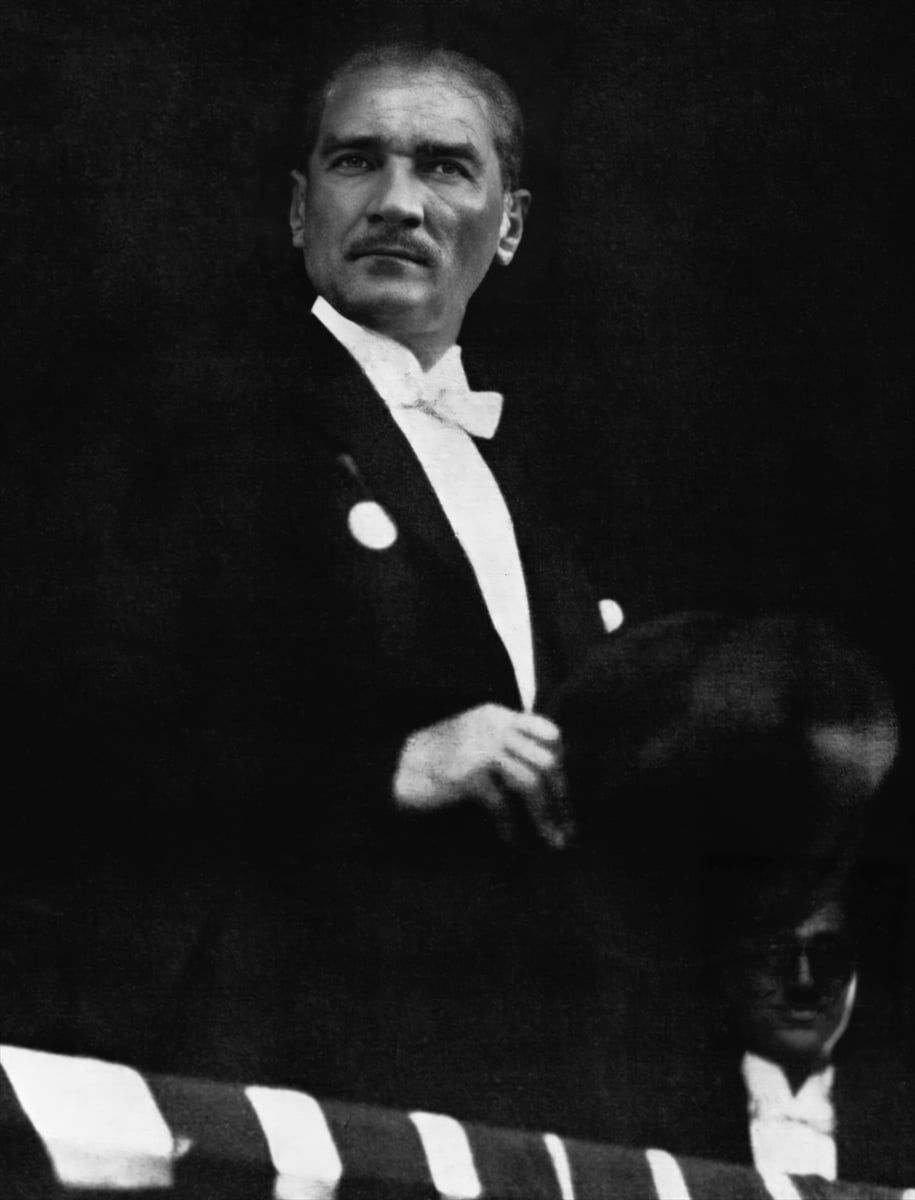
Mustafa Kemal Atatürk with the Medal of Independence with Red-Green Ribbon

This list includes recipients of the Medal of Independence with Red-Green Ribbon (Kırmızı-Yeşil şeritli İstiklal madalyası or Kırmızı-Yeşil kurdeleli İstiklal madalyası ) of Turkey.

With the direction dated October 23, 1923, the Medal of Independence with Red-Green Ribbon was given to following MPs of the Grand National Assembly of Turkey:

- Kılıç Ali Bey (Kılıç) (Gaziantep),
- Ali Saip Bey (Ursavaş) (Urfa),
- Mehmet Rıza Bey (Silsüpür) (Kırşehir, but he was arrested and later executed by hanging on 11 January 1926. He couldn't participate in the ceremony that was held on 23 March 1925.)

With the direction dated November 21, 1923, the Medal of Independence with Red-Green Ribbon was given to following MP's:

- 1. Gazi Mustafa Kemal Pasha (Atatürk) (Müşir) (Ankara)
- 2. Fevzi Pasha (Çakmak) (Müşir) (Kozan)
- 3. Kâzım Karabekir Pasha (Ferik) (Edirne)
- 4. Ali Fuat Pasha (Cebesoy) (Mirliva) (Ankara)
- 5. Fahrettin Pasha (Altay) (Mirliva) (Mersin)
- 6. İsmet Pasha (İnönü) (Mirliva) (Edirne)
- 7. Refet Pasha (Bele) (Mirliva) (Izmir)
- 8. Kâzım Pasha (Özalp) (Mirliva) (Karesi)
- 9. "Kel" Ali Bey (Çetinkaya) (Kara Hisar-ı Sâhib)
- 10. Hüseyin Avni Bey/Pasha (Zaimler) (Saruhan)
- 11. Hüsrev Bey (Gerede) (Trabzon)
- 12. Cavit Bey/Pasha (Erdel) (Kars)
- 13. Cafer Tayyar Pasha (Eğilmez) (Edirne)
- 14. Hacı Şükrü Bey (Aydındağ) (Diyâr-i Bekir)
- 15. Mehmet Esat Efendi (İleri) (Aydın)
- 16. Memduh Necdet Bey (Erberk) (Kara Hisâr-ı Şarkî)
- 17. Ömer Lütfi Bey (Argeşo) (Kara Hisar-ı Sâhib)
- 18. "Çolak" Selâhattin Bey (Köseoğlu) (Mersin)
- 19. Mahmut Celâlettin Bey (Bayar) (Saruhan)
- 20. Mustafa Necati Bey (Uğural) (Saruhan)
- 21. Mehmet Reşat Bey (Kayalı) (Saruhan)
- 22. Mehmet Vehbi Bey (Bolak) (Karesi)
- 23. Hamdi Bey (Aksoy) (Ertuğrul)
- 24. Hüseyin Bey (Gökçelik) (Elâziz)
- 25. Rıza Bey (Kotan) (Muş)

Until April 20, 1925, the Medal of Independence with Red-Green Ribbon was given to following MP's:

- Mehmet Necati Bey (Memişoğlu) (Lâzistan)
- Mehmet Atıf Bey (Tüzün) (Kayseri)
- Süleyman Sırrı Bey (İçöz) (Yozgat)
- Hafız İbrahim Efendi (Demiralay) (Isparta)
- İsmail Şükrü Efendi (Çelikalay) (Kara Hisar-ı Sâhib)
- tr:Hacim Muhittin Bey (Çarıklı) (Karesi)
- Cevat Abbas Bey (Gürer) (Bolu)
- Mehmet Fuat Bey (Carım) (İzmit)
- Recep Seven (Samsun)
- Hafız Mehmet Efendi (Şahin) (Gaziantep)
- Mehmet Yasin Bey (Kutluğ) (Gaziantep)
- Ragıp Bey (Yoğun) (Gaziantep)
- Hacı Bedir Ağa (Fırat) (Malatya)
- Arslan Bey (Toğuz) (Maraş)
- Zamir Bey (Damar Arıkoğlu) (Adana)
- Fuat (Umay) (Bolu)
- Tunalı Hilmi Bey (Bolu)
- Emin Bey (Sazak) (Eskişehir)
- Münir Hüsrev Bey (Erzurum)
- Mehmet Şükrü Bey (Gülez) (Bolu)
- Mehmet Salih Efendi (Yeşiloğlu) (Bolu)

After April 20, 1925, the Medal of Independence with Green Ribbon of following MPs who proved their front services, were changed into Medal of Independence with Red-Green Ribbon :

- Esat Bey (Özoğuz) (Lâzistan)
- İsmail Safa Bey (Özler) (Mersin)
- Muhtar Fikri Bey (Gücüm) (Mersin)
- Mahmut Esat Bey (Bozkurt) (İzmir)
- Emin Bey (Erkul) (Bursa)
- Haydar Hilmi Bey (Vaner) (Van)
- Zeynelabidin (Abidin) Bey (Atak) (Lâzistan)
- Mehmet Tevfik Bey (Kütükbaşı) (Erzincan),
- Mehmet Faik Bey (Kaltakkıran) (Edirne)
- ‘Yenibahçeli’ Ahmet Şükrü Bey (Oğuz) (Istanbul)
- Mazhar Bey (German) (Aydın)
- Eşref Bey (Akman) (Adana)
- Abdülgafur Efendi (Iştın) (Karesi)
- Sabit Bey (Gözügeçgel) (Kayseri)
- Hüseyin Hüsnü Bey (Özdamar) (Isparta)
- Rıza Nur Bey (Sinop)
- Hasan Fehmi (Ataç) (Gümüşhane)
- Yusuf Kemal Bey (Tengirşenk) (Kastamonu)
- İbrahim Süreyya Bey (Yiğit) (Saruhan)
- Zülfü Tiğrel (Diyâr-i Bekir)
- Mehmet Rasim Bey (Başara) (Sivas)
- Ali Rıza Bey (Bebe) (Istanbul),
- Mustafa Vasfi Bey (Süsoy) (Tokat)
- Aziz Feyzi Pirinççizade (Pirinççioğlu) (Diyarbakır)
