= Siege of Anapa =

The siege of Anapa may refer to:

- Siege of Anapa (1788), a battle in the Russo-Turkish War (1787–1792) and the Russo-Circassian War
- Siege of Anapa (1791), a battle in the Russo-Turkish War (1787–1792) and the Russo-Circassian War
- Siege of Anapa (1828), an event in the Russo-Circassian War
