= Mustafa Sıtkı Bilgin =

Mustafa Sıtkı Bilgin (born March 4, 1967, Çaykara, Trabzon) is a Turkish historian, academic and former rector of Artvin Çoruh University, serving from February 6, 2021, to April 10, 2025.

Prof Mustafa Sıtkı Bilgin was born in Çaykara, Trabzon Province, in the Black Sea Region of Turkey. He graduated from Istanbul University, Dept of History in 1989. Then, he received his first MA Degree from Gazi University in Ankara in 1993. Bilgin studied there social and cultural history of Trabzon during 1774-1777 and the practice of the Ottoman Court System based on Ottoman Court Documents. Afterwards he went to the USA and received his second MA Degree from the University of Connecticut, Department of History in 1996. He studied there about American history and foreign policy especially during the Civil War and Reconstruction era. Thereafter he went to the United Kingdom to complete his PhD study. He obtained his Doctoral degree in the field of the Middle East in 2001. Bilgin returned to Turkey and became assistant professor of International History at Kahramanmaras Sütçü İmam University (KSU) in 2002. Bilgin began to work at the Center for Euroasian Strategic Studies, a Turkish think-tank institute based in Ankara, as an expert in the fields of Middle East and Caucasia and EU-Turkey-American relations in 2003.

Later on, Bilgin returned to his university and wrote many articles related to the Middle East, Caucasia, Turkish foreign policy and Anglo-TurkishAmerican relations. His book 'Britain and Turkey in the Middle East: Politics and Influence in the Early Cold War Era' was published by IB Tauris in 2008. Then in 2011 Bilgin became professor of International History at International Dept of Ankara Yıldırım Beyazıt University. He was the founder and head of the IR Department and took the position of Director of Center for International Relations and Strategic Studies. He published several books and hundreds of articles related on Turkey's Foreign Policy, Middle East, Cold War, Anglo-Turkish-American Relations, Caucasia and Armenian Issues.

Shortly after starting to work at Kahramanmaraş Sütçü İmam University in May 2002, he received the position of assistant professor. Bilgin, who started working at the Armenian Studies Institute in January 2003, served as editor in English and Turkish journals affiliated with the institute. During this period, he conducted original research in the fields of the Armenian issue, the Cyprus issue, the Middle East, the Caucasus, and Turkish-British-American relations, and made significant contributions to diplomatic history literature by writing articles in both domestic and foreign academic journals. He returned to the university in 2004 and received the title of associate professor in the field of Diplomatic History in 2006. His first classic book, was "Britain and Turkey in the Middle East: Politics and Influence in the Middle East in the Early Cold War Era", published in England in 2008 by IB Tauris, one of the international publishing houses in the field of Middle East studies.

Bilgin has long tried to shed light on many issues in the fields of Turkish history and foreign policy with his intensive archival studies. In his book mentioned above, Bilgin not only revealed Turkey's Palestine and Middle Eastern policies during the İnönü and Menderes periods in an original manner, but also produced one of the classic works of Neo-Classical Cold War historiography with an extensive research both in domestic and foreign archives. In this context, he introduced Turkey's 'Triangular Strategy' terminology and paradigm to international literature. Apart from this, it also filled important gaps in various other issues, such as the policy followed by Turkey in the Second World War and the policy followed by Armenia in the Middle East. He also carried out very important archival research on Cyprus. His scientific studies are given in general terms below. Bilgin has 11 books and around 150 articles.

== Educational positions ==
- 1985-1989: Istanbul University, Dept of History, Undergraduate
- 1990-1993: Gazi University, Social Science Institute, Post-Graduate Study (I)
- 1994-1997: The University of Connecticut (USA): Post-Graduate Study (Il),
- 1997-2002: The University of Birmingham (UK): PhD.
- 2006-2011 Assoc. Prof of International History.
- 2012- 2014: Prof. Dr., Yıldırım Beyazıt Üniversity, Head of the Dept of International Relations
- 2012-2020: Director at the Institution for Strategic Research and International Relations
- 2021-February Became Rector of Artvin Çoruh University

== Books ==
- Britain and Turkey in the Middle East: Politics and Influence in the Early Cold War Era, IB Tauris: London & New York, 2007.
- Contemporary Analysis On Syrian Immigration Issue in Europe And Turkey, Akçağ Yayınevi: Ankara, 2022.
- Emperyalizm ve Ermeni Meselesi Uluslararasl Sempozyumu, ESAM: Ankara, 2015.
- I. Dünya Savaşının 100. Yıldönümü Uluslararasl Sempozyumu: Emperyalizm ve Îslam Dünyası, ESAM: Ankara, 2015.
- Uluslararası Değişimler ve Türkiye, Uluslararasl Ìlişkiler ve Stratejik Araştırmalar Enstitüsü: Ankara, 2018.
- 1000. Yılında Türk-Ermeni ilişkileri Atatürk Araştırma Merkezi: Ankara, 2019.
- Yaşam Karaçay (Ed.) Artvin Tarihi ilk Çağdan 1918'e, Akçağ Yayınevi: Ankara, 2022.
- 100. Yılında Türkiye Cumhuriyeti'nde Siyasi Sosyal ve Ekonomik Hayat, Atatürk Araştırmama Merkezi Yayınlan: Ankara, 2023.
- Türkiye Cumhuriyeti Tarihi-I: 19. Yüzyılın İkinci Yarısından 20. Yüzyılın Başlarına Kadar Osmanlı Devleti ve Yeni Türkiye'nin Doğuşu, Atatürk Araştırma Merkezi Yayınları: Ankara, 2023.
- Türkiye Cumhuriyeti Tarihi-II: Yeni Türkiye: Türkiye Cumhuriyeti, Atatürk Araştırma Merkezi Yayınları: Ankara, 2023.
- Türkiye Cumhuriyeti Tarihi-III: 1960 Sonrası Türkiye (1960–2000), Atatürk Araştırma Merkezi Yayınları: Ankara, 2023.

== Selected Articles in English ==
- "British Attitude towards Turkey's Policies in the Middle East (1945-1947), The Turkish Yearbook of International Reıations xxxııı, 257269, (2003).
- "The Impacts oflndustrial Revolution on the American Social Life in the 19th Century: The John Brown Case” Siyasal Bilgiler Fakültesi Dergisi, 59, 2, 19–38, (2004).
- "The Construction of the Bagdad Railway and İts Impact on Anglo-Turkish Relations, 1902-1913”, OTAM, 16, 109–130, (2004).
- "Attitudes of the Great Powers towards the Ottoman Armenians up to the Outbreak of the First World War”, Review of Armenian Studies, I, 4, 36-54 (2003).
- "Soviet-Armenian Collaboration against Turkey in the postSecond World War Period, (1945-1947) Review of Armenian Studies II, 5, 2036, (2003).
- "Turkey's Involvement in Middle Eastern Politics in the 1950s” Folklor/Edebiyat, 45, (2005).
- "The Issue of Turkey's Participation in the Second World War and İts Impact on Anglo-Turkish Relations, 1943-1945", XIV th Turkish Congress of History (Türk Tarih Kongresi) Ankara, 2002.
- The Historical Course of Anglo-Turkish Relations in the Middle East, 1938–1960, Middle East: Caos or/and Order? Conference, (Orta Doğu: Kaos mu, Düzen mi? Konferansı), 157-168 İstanbul, 2004.
- "Ottoman-Armenian Relations during the Great War, (19141918)”, BRISMES Conference on Middle Eastern Studies: Domination, Expression and Liberation in the Middle East, London, 2004.
- "Turkey's Involvement in Middle Eastern Politics in the 1950s” Folklor/Edebiyat, 45, (2005).
- "Turkey's Arab Relations Have been More Zig-zag than stop-go” Europe's World, Guz (2009).
- "The nature of Turkey's Foreign policy and the Middle East", Europe's World, http://www.europesworld.org, 26. 10. 2009.
- 'The Historical Direction of Turkey's foreign Policy Towards the Middle East' ADAM, c.ı, no.1.

== Selected Articles in Turkish ==
- "Yakın Dönem Türk-lrak İlişkilerinde Güvenlik Faktörünün Etkisi (1926-2002)" içinde 21. Yüzyılda Türk Dünyası Jeopolitiği, (Der.) Ü. Özdağ ve diğerleri (Ankara: ASAM, 2003).
- "Atatürk Döneminde Türkiye'nin Orta Doğu Politikası (19231938)”, içinde Irak Dosyası, C.l-ll, (Der.) A. Ahmetbeyoğlu ve diğerleri (İst: TATAV, 2003).
- "Türk-lrak İlişkilerinin Tarihsel Boyutu” içinde Irak Krizi,(Der.) Ü. Özdağ ve diğerleri (Ankara: ASAM, 2003).
- "Büyük Orta Doğu Projesi Ölü Doğmuş Bir Plandır" içinde Orta Doğu Kuşatması: Yeni Dünya Düzeni'nin Orta Doğu Ayağı, (Der.) Atilla Akar (İstanbul: Timaş Yay., 2004).
- "Türkiye'nin AB'ye Katılma Sürecinde Orta Doğu'da Sahip Olduğu Stratejik Konumun Önemi” içinde Türkiye Avrupa Birliği İlişkileri (Der.) Harun Arıkan Muhsin Kar (Ankara: 2005).
- "Lozan Konferansında Ermeni Meselesi: İtilaf Devletlerinin Diplomatik Manevraları ve Türkiye'nin Karşı Siyaseti” Belleten, LXIX, 254, (2005)..
- "Atatürk Döneminde Türkiye'nin Balkan Diplomasisi, (19231930)” Atatürk Araştırma Merkezi Dergisi, XX, 60 (2004).
- "Türk ve İngiliz Belgelerine Göre Osmanlı Devleti'nin I. Dünya savaşı Sırasında Ermenilere Karşı Takip Ettiği Siyaset" Ermeni Araştırmaları, 10, (2003).
- "İkinci Dünya Savaş Sonrası Uzak Şark Türkleri'nin Sovyet Esareti Altına Düşmesi ve Ayaz İshaki'nin Siyasi Mücadelesi”, Türk Dünyası Tarih Kültür Dergisi, 216, 12–19, (2004).
- "Turkey's Involvement in Middle Eastern Politics in the 1950s” Folklor/Edebiyat, 45, (2005).
- "Türkiye, İsrail ve Arap Üçgeninde Ermenistan'ın Orta Doğu Politikası” Stratejik Araştırmalar Dergisi, 3, 5, (2005).

== Panels and Conferences ==
Bilgin joined about 100 panels and conferences both national and international levels.

== Prizes ==
- YÖK scholarship between 1994 and 2002,
- 2004 TÜBİTAK foreign publication award,
- KSU achievement award in 2004,
- Between August 2005 and February 2006, his project was accepted by TÜBİTAK and he was sent to England to conduct research on Cyprus.
- 2006 TÜBA publication award,
- 2007 Young Pens Regional Scientist of the Year award,
- 2008 TÜBİTAK publication award,
- 2012 TÜBİTAK SOBAG Research Project Coordinator.

== Selected Projects ==
- TÜBA Kıbrıs Projesi İngiltere Arşivleri (PRO-Londra, 2005–2006)
- TÜBİTAK: Kahramanmaraş'ta Kaybolmaya Yüz Tutmuş El Sanatları Üzerine Kapsamlı Bir Araştırma (Ank, 2012)
- Değerli Gençler Projesi (Gençlik ve Spor Bakalığı, 2015–16)
- Ermeni Meselesinin Ulusal ve Uluslararası Boyutları Projesi (YTB, 2016)
- 2017-1-TR01-KA205-041102 nolu "Development and Implementation of Social - Science Training Program for Young Refugees' AB-UIusaI Ajans Projesi (2017–2019)
- 2022-KA220-YOU-FBB456B8 Back to Green: Initiative to Engage Youth to Environmental Responsibilities by Increasing Competences to Tackle with Environmental Challenges (AB-UIusaI Ajans Projesi 2022)
