= Şahin Bey =

Turkish militia officer (1877–1920)

Coordinates: 36.906566°N 37.20417°E

Commander Şahin Bey
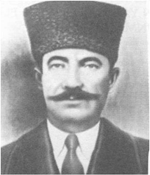
- Şahin Bey c. 1918
- Born: Mehmed Said; 1877; Aintab, Aleppo vilayet, Ottoman Empire (now Gaziantep, Turkey)
- Died: 28 March 1920 (aged 43) Elmalı Bridge, Şahinbey, Ottoman Empire
- Allegiance: Ottoman Empire
- Branch: Turkish Revolutionaries
- Service years: 1914 - 1920
- Rank: General
- Conflicts: Franco-Turkish War (1918–1921); Battle of Marash; Siege of Aintab †

Mehmed Said (1877, Antep, Aleppo Vilayet – 28 March 1920), better known as Şahin Bey or Şahan Bey in the local Turkish dialect, was the commander of the Turkish revolutionaries that were stationed in the city of Gaziantep during the Turkish War of Independence.

== Early life and family ==
Mehmed Said is commonly thought to be born in the Bostancı neighborhood of Antep to a family of Turkish origin. It is also claimed that he was actually born in the village Zilif (in modern-day al-Bab District, northwestern Syria) and belonged to the Turkmen Elbegli tribe.

His parents were Abdullah and Ayyuş. Because his father died when he was very young, his maternal uncle brought him up. In 1902, he married with his wife, Zeynep, and later had two children: Mehmet Hayri and Mehmet Sait.

== Ottoman Army Years ==
Beginning in 1899, he started to take active roles at numerous battles for the Ottoman Empire. He was sent to Yemen to fight against the local imams that were trying to take the control of the region from the Ottomans. His efforts would help the Ottoman Empire to control Yemen until its dissolution after World War I.

Later, he voluntarily went to Ottoman Tripolitania in 1911 to defend the Ottoman territories against the invading Italian forces. After a successful beginning for the Ottoman side, the Italo-Turkish War turned out to be an Italian victory in the end. An outcome that ended the Ottoman presence in the North Africa totally. Disappointed after the defeat, Şahin Bey returned to Istanbul and was sent to the Balkan front immediately. Another defeat was waiting for him there. Turks lost nearly all of their territories in Europe.

Şahin Bey's return to the Western front would come after the Ottoman Empire entered the World War I on the side of the Central Powers. He was sent to Galicia to help the allies of the empire. He was later transferred to the Middle Eastern front of the war, specifically to Sinai in 1917. There he took part in the Sinai and Palestine Campaign which resulted with another defeat for the Ottoman-German alliance. Şahin Bey became a prisoner of war in the hands of the British forces. He was not released until 1919.

When he returned in 1919 to his homeland, south-central Turkey, he became the representative of the Ottoman Army, with a duty to control the important road between Kilis and Gaziantep. There he saw the disadvantageous results of World War I.

== Local leader of the revolution ==
1919 was an important year for the Turkish revolution against the invading Allies. Mustafa Kemal was starting a revolt in Anatolia, and the French were invading Şahin Bey's homeland. Şahin Bey decided to join the spirit of the revolution and became the leader of the local revolutionaries.

He was hoping to defeat the French Army, as his comrades had done at the Battle of Marash. For this purpose, he attacked Charles Joseph Edouard Andréa's forces, a spearhead group of the actual army, that left Kilis to Aintab in the morning of 26 March 1920. The combat started with the advance of the Turkish side, but turned into a defeat when the main French force arrived onto the battlefield. Şahin Bey nevertheless fought against the advancing Andréa's troops and managed to stop them on Elmalı bridge. On 28 March, he and his men were killed, allowing Henri Gouraud and Andrea's forces could enter to the city of Aintab.
