= Sütçü İmam incident =

1919 alleged incident in present-day Turkey

The Sütçü İmam incident (Turkish: Sütçü İmam olayı) also known as Uzun Oluk incident (Uzun Oluk olayı) is a term used in modern Turkish historiography to refer to the first alleged armed action against the French occupying forces in Marash (present day Kahramanmaraş, Turkey) on October 31, 1919. As such, it is considered among Turkish historians as the beginning of the Battle of Marash.

== Background ==
After the Armistice of Mudros was signed, Marash, Aintab and Adana (Çukurova) came under the occupation of British forces. In the autumn of 1919, the British handed control over of these regions to the French, who in October entered Marash. The French occupation force was primarily made up of troops from the French Colonial Forces and the French Armenian Legion. The Armenian Legion, comprising 2000 armed auxiliaries entered the city the day after, on 30 October.

== Incident ==
=== Turkish Version of Events ===
According to the version found in Turkish sources, on the night of 31 October, three Muslim women who were coming out of a public bath (hamam) on Uzunoluk street were accosted by an Armenian legionnaire and harassed and molested. The soldier attempted to tear off the veil of the women stating, "This is no longer the land of the Turks, you cannot walk around with a veil in French territory." The women started to scream and ask for help. A neighbor, Çakmakcı Sait, who ran forth without carrying a weapon was then shot and killed by the Armenian legionnaires. Soon after, an individual by the name of Sütçü İmam (literally, milkman Imam) opened fire on the Armenians, killing or wounding (depending on the version) one or more of the soldiers.

After the incident, Sütçü İmam escaped and took refuge in a village nearby. The troops from the French Armenian Legion who arrived allegedly opened fire in retaliation at the civilians present on the spot and also killed a certain Hüseyin, son of Zülfikar Çavuş. French soldiers arrested Sütçü İmam's cousin, Kadir, and tied his hands and feet from behind submitting him to torture and mutilation, by cutting his nose and ears. He died of suffocation while in custody.

The tension sparked by these incidents increased gradually and led to the armed uprising against the French army in February 1920 (Battle of Marash).

=== Alternate View ===
A less dramatic account of the event is presented by an American relief worker who was working in Marash at the time, Stanley E. Kerr. According to an Armenian working for the French legion he interviewed years later for his book (who was unaware of the Turkish version), an Armenian rakıcı (that is, a person who prepares the popular alcoholic drink rakı) was serving several Armenian legionnaires with his drink when one of them, who was intoxicated after drinking one cup too many, approached a Muslim woman exiting the bath and removed her veil. An altercation followed and an unknown assailant (possibly Sütçü İmam) shot and killed one of the legionnaires, but, incidentally, not the offending one.

== Memory ==
In memory of this alleged incident, Kahramanmaraş Sütçü İmam University is named after Sütçü İmam in 1992. Necmettin Erbakan tended to reference the role of Islamic notables during the Turkish War of Independence- such as Sütçü İmam and Rıdvan Hoca.

== See also ==
- Battle of Marash
- Franco-Turkish War
- Turkish War of Independence
- Timeline of the Turkish War of Independence
