= Hüseyin Avni Zaimler =

Turkish politician

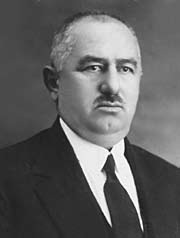

Member of the Parliament for Saruhanlı
- In office 23 April 1920 – 10 March 1930

Personal details
- Born: Hüseyin Avni; 1877 Bitola (Turkish: Manastır), Ottoman Empire (modern North Macedonia)
- Died: 10 March 1930 Adana, Turkey
- Party: Republican People's Party

Military service
- Allegiance: Ottoman Empire (1895–1918); Turkey (1919–1924)
- Years of service: November 24, 1895 – May 7, 1918; May 15, 1919 – March 31, 1924
- Rank: Major general
- Commands: Monastir Central Command, Monastir 2nd Hunter Battalion, Adana 1st Battalion, Adana Gendarmerie Regiment, Izmir Gendarmerie Regiment; Akhisar Area Command, Izmir Northern Front (deputy)
- Battles/wars: Greco-Turkish War; Balkan Wars; World War I Turkish War of Independence

Hüseyin Avni Zaimler (1877, Bitola – March 10, 1930, Adana), also known as Hüseyin Avni Bey or Hüseyin Avni Pasha, was an officer of the Ottoman Army and a general of the Turkish Army. After the declaration of the Republic of Turkey, he became a politician and served in the Grand National Assembly of Turkey. By Mustafa Kemal Atatürk's order on November 21, 1923, Huseyin Avni received the Medal of Independence with Red-Green Ribbon, the highest decoration at the time, for his service during the Turkish War of Independence. On 24 January 1924, he was promoted to the rank of Mirliva. He was a descendant of the Ottoman Grand Vizier Lala Mehmed Pasha.

== Biography ==
Hüseyin Avni was born in 1877 as the son of Mustafa Bey. Upon graduating from Monastir Military High School in 1893, where he befriended Mustafa Kemal Atatürk, he attended Ottoman Military Academy. In 1903 he was promoted to the rank of Captain and in 1908 to the rank of Major.

== Medals and decorations ==
- Medal of Independence with Red-Green Ribbon

== See also ==
- List of recipients of the Medal of Independence with Red-Green Ribbon (Turkey)
