= Armenian Legion (disambiguation) =

The Armenian Legion may refer to:

- Armenian Legion, a World War II unit in the German army composed of Armenian POWs
- Legio I Armeniaca, a legion of the late Roman Empire, created in the late 3rd century
- Legio II Armeniaca, a legion of the late Roman Empire, in the late 3rd century
- French Armenian Legion, a World War I unit in the French Army composed of Armenians
- Armenian Legion (Ukraine), a military formation of the Armed Forces of Ukraine
