= Siege of Anapa (1828) =

- Part of Russo-Turkish War (1828–1829); Russo-Circassian War
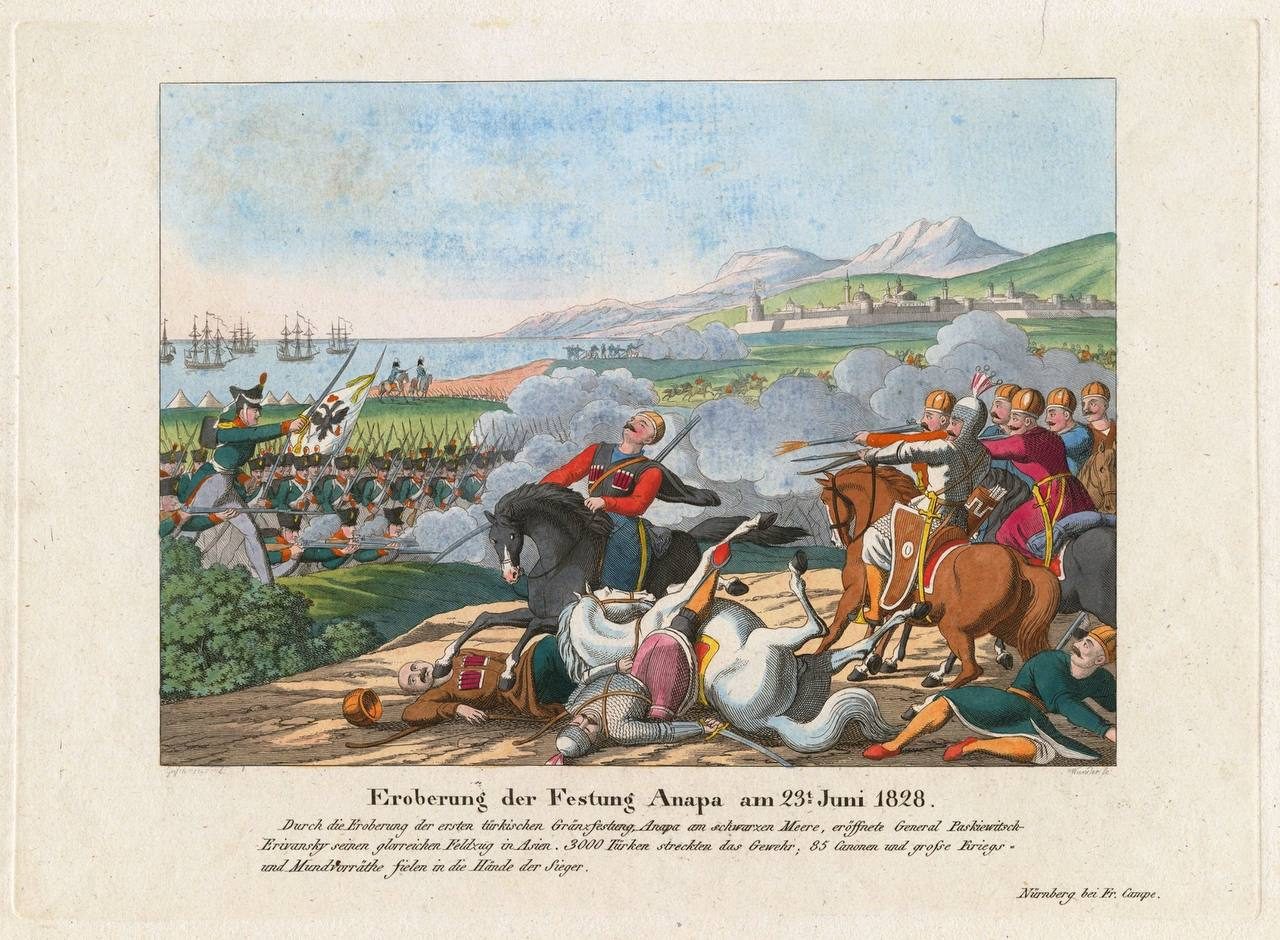
- Siege of Anapa (1828), by Er. Campe.
Date	May 14 – June 24, 1828
Location	Anapa fortress, Circassia
Result	Russian victory

Belligerents
Russia	Ottoman Empire; Circassia

Commanders and leaders
(Russian Empire) Aleksandr Menshikov (Russian Empire) Aleksey Greig (Russian Empire) Colonel Provski	(Ottoman Empire) Osman-Paşa (Circassia) Seferbiy Zaneqo (Circassia) Hanash Tsakaqo

Strength
8,000 troops 29 warships 1,679 cannons	4,500 troops

Casualties and losses
1,000 killed and wounded	3,000 killed and wounded

The Siege of Anapa was a key military operation during both the Russo-Circassian War and the Russo-Turkish War. Taking place between May 14 and June 24, 1828, it marked a significant Russian victory, as the strategic Ottoman fortress of Anapa fell to Russian forces after weeks of intense fighting. The capture of Anapa weakened Ottoman influence in the north-eastern Black Sea region and disrupted Circassian coordination against Russian expansion.

== Background ==
The fortress of Anapa, located on the northeastern Black Sea coast, was a vital Ottoman military and logistical stronghold. Established in the late 18th century, it served as a base for Ottoman control in the region and as a center for supplying and organizing Circassian resistance to Russian encroachment.

In 1828, following the declaration of war between the Russian and Ottoman Empires, Anapa became an immediate target for the Russian military as part of its broader strategy to secure dominance over the Black Sea coast and neutralize Ottoman and Circassian opposition in the Caucasus.

== Siege ==
The siege began on May 14, 1828, with a coordinated Russian assault by land and sea. The Russian Black Sea Fleet, commanded by Admiral Aleksey Greig, included 29 ships armed with 1,679 cannons, blockading the fortress and cutting off Ottoman reinforcements by sea. This naval blockade was particularly effective as the Ottoman fleet had been severely weakened in the Battle of Navarino the year prior.

On land, a force of 2,000 troops, including seven infantry companies, four Cossack regiments, and 20 artillery pieces under Colonel Provski, was deployed to attack Anapa from the east. However, due to a storm, the Russian fleet was forced to withdraw from the shore, leaving the land forces without naval support. The Ottoman garrison launched counterattacks, causing Russian casualties and forcing a temporary retreat.

Once the storm subsided on May 18, the Russian fleet resumed operations, and an additional 4,000 troops under Prince Aleksandr Menshikov landed south of the fortress. The Russian forces encircled Anapa and began bombarding it with heavy artillery, causing severe damage to its fortifications.

Despite these attacks, the Ottoman garrison, supported by Circassian volunteers, offered fierce resistance. Circassian fighters harassed the Russian forces from the rear, complicating their siege efforts. By late June, however, the defenders were severely weakened; only 1,500 soldiers remained capable of fighting. The Russians, recognizing the fortress’s dire situation, offered Osman Pasha the opportunity to surrender. Although Osman Pasha initially refused, the capture of an Ottoman reinforcement ship en route from Trabzon made the hopelessness of the situation clear.

On June 24, 1828, after weeks of intense artillery bombardment that nearly destroyed Anapa’s walls, the fortress fell to the Russians. The remaining defenders were captured or killed, and Osman Pasha was taken prisoner.

== Aftermath ==
Following their victory at Anapa, the Russian forces moved south along the Black Sea coast. On July 23, 1828, they captured the fortress of Poti, despite heavy losses due to fierce resistance by Arslan Bey and his 300 defenders.

Simultaneously, General Ivan Paskievich advanced into Ottoman territory in the south. On June 26, 1828, Russian forces crossed the Arpachay River and continued their campaign, targeting key Ottoman strongholds in the Caucasus region.

The fall of Anapa dealt a severe blow to Ottoman influence and disrupted Circassian resistance efforts, marking a turning point in the Russo-Circassian War. The fortress remained under Russian control following the Treaty of Adrianople (1829), which formally ended the Russo-Turkish War and solidified Russian dominance in the northeastern Black Sea region.
