= Battle of Urfa =

Turkish military campaign against France

Coordinates: 37°09′N 38°48′E

- Part of the Franco-Turkish War
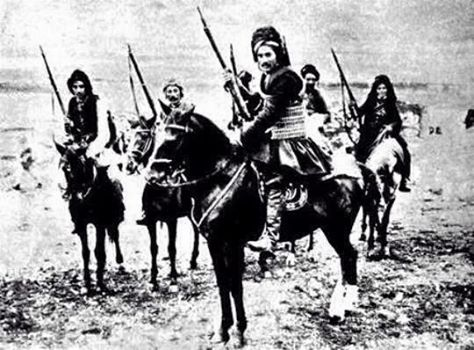
- Kurdish militias taking up arms against the occupying French forces
Date	February 9 – April 11, 1920
Location	Urfa, Aleppo Vilayet, Ottoman Empire
Result	Turkish victory: Turkish breached Safe conduct

Belligerents
Kuva-yi Milliye (Kurdistan Region) Kurdish tribes	France

Commanders and leaders
Ali Saip Bey	(French Third Republic) Major G. Hauger †

Strength
3,000	473

Casualties and losses
Unknown	~460 killed or captured

The Battle of Urfa (Turkish: Urfa Muharebesi, French: Le guet-apens d'Ourfa) was an uprising in the spring of 1920 against the French army occupying the city of Urfa (modern Şanlıurfa) by the Turkish National Forces. The French garrison of Urfa held out for two months until it sued for negotiations with the Turks for safe conduct out of the city. The Turks reneged on their promises, however, and the French unit was killed in an ambush staged by the Turkish Nationalists during its retreat from Urfa.

== Background ==
The city of Urfa was occupied by the French army in the autumn of 1919 with the aim of incorporating this portion of the Ottoman Empire into the French Mandate of Syria. The designs of the French over the region of Cilicia were denounced by Mustafa Kemal Pasha, the leader of the newly formed Turkish National Movement. In the later part of 1919 Kemal and his supporters began to prepare to launch major insurrections against the thinly spread French units garrisoned in Marash, Aintab and Urfa to force the French to give up their territorial pretensions in the region. In January 1920, Ali Saip Bey, the deputy from Urfa to the Turkish National Congress, called on the Kurdish tribes of Urfa to close ranks against the French and resist. His actions were coordinated with Kılıç Ali Bey (Kuluj Ali), a Kurdish army captain.

== Battle ==
On February 7, 1920, Ali Saip Bey issued a demand that French forces evacuate Urfa in 24 hours. When the French refused this ultimatum, the Turkish forces rose up on February 9 and placed the French garrison under siege. The insurrection of Urfa was launched at the very moment the Turkish National forces were facing imminent defeat in Marash. The garrison, made up of 473 Frenchmen, Senegalese, Algerians, and Armenians, put up a stiff resistance against the Turkish and Kurdish Nationalists for sixty-one days. On April 7, with supplies of ammunition and food almost depleted, Major Hauger, commander of the beleaguered detachment, asked the Turkish Nationalists that his men be provided with safe conduct and that the Christian population to remain unharmed in exchange for the garrison's evacuation from the city.

Ali Bey accepted Hauger's request and met him at a bridge near the American Mission hospital. In the presence of Major Hauger's subordinate, Captain Sajous, and the Armenian physician Dr. Bechlian, the two commanders discussed terms and agreed that the French would be able to leave with their arms. Ali Bey assured Hauger that the French would be provided with security as far as Arab Punar. Hauger also requested that Ali Bey give ten Turkish notables to accompany his men as hostages, but Ali Bey rejected this and gave him ten of his gendarmes instead. At an hour past midnight, the remaining 300 troops under Hauger's command began their withdrawal from Urfa.

At a little before dawn, as the column approached a defile called Ferish Pasha Ravine, it was fusilladed by Kurds who had taken up positions on the ridges overlooking the ravine. The soldiers that Ali Bey had given to Hauger professed their ignorance of the ambush. Hauger attempted in vain to organize a surrender. Some of the French soldiers were able to break through the encirclement but most of them were captured or killed. Hauger himself was killed. Only a handful of the original 473 men and officers of the Urfa garrison were able to reach safety at Arab Punar.
