= Siege of Aintab =

1920–21 siege of the Franco-Turkish War

Coordinates: 37°04′00″N 37°23′00″E

- Part of the Franco-Turkish War
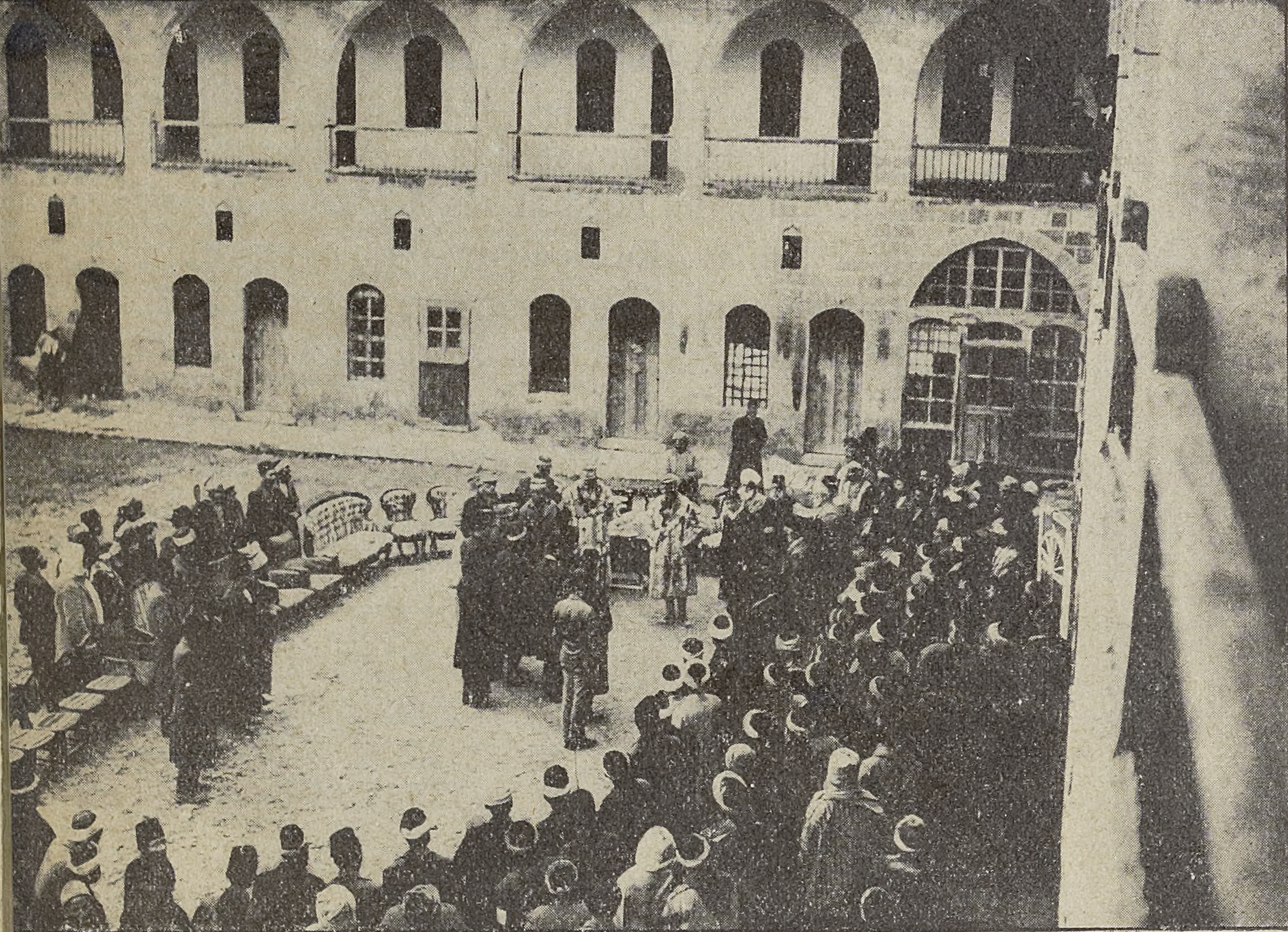
- After the siege of Aïntab and the Turkish surrender of February 8, 1921, the Turkish authorities of the city presented themselves to General de Lamothe, commanding the 2nd division.
Date	1 April 1920 – 8 February 1921
Location	Aintab, Aleppo Vilayet, Ottoman Empire
Result	French victory

Belligerents
(Turkey) Kuva-yi Milliye	France: (Armenia) French Armenian Legion

Commanders and leaders
(Turkey) Mustafa Hilmi Bey (Turkey) "Kılıç" Ali Bey (Turkey) Şahin Bey † (Turkey) Şefik "Özdemir" Bey [tr] (Turkey) Colonel Kenan Bey	(French Third Republic) Henri Gouraud (French Third Republic) Louis Albert Quérette (French Third Republic) Fernand Goubeau (French Third Republic) Pierre Flye Sainte-Marie (French Third Republic) Maurice-Jean-Joseph Abadie (French Third Republic) C.J. E. Andréa

Strength
Total force: (Note: 2.070 armed and 850 unarmed fighters (=2.920)); 2,920 militia fighters, 6 machine guns, 3 mountain guns	Total force: (Note: In April 1920 the French forces consisted of 4,500 soldiers. With the arrival of Goubeau 4th division on 20 November 1920 the French siege force increased to: 13 infantry battalions and 1.5 cavalry regiment (=12,000 soldiers). After Goubeau's departure on 18 December the french force decreased to: 9 infantry battalions (four of which with less than 300 fighters) and 2 cavalry squadrons (=6500 soldiers). There are still 6000 men at the end of the siege); 12,000 French soldiers, 1,500 Armenian soldiers, (Note: On 29 October 1919 the third battalion and the staff of the French Armenian legion (lieutenant-colonel Flye Sainte-Marie) were the bulk of the hastily assembled French force assigned to relieve Aintab British garrison. On 13 November, the third battalion (except 2 machine gun platoons) left the city. On 30 April 1920, Flye Sainte-Marie and French Armenian legion last soldiers went away. The French Armenian legion was dissolved on 1 September 1920.); 4 tanks, 11 artillery batteries, 1,400 military animals, 6 aircraft, 1 mobile hospital

Casualties and losses
6,317 killed (mostly civilians) over 2,000 prisoners 1,400 guns 10 machine guns	1,600 French soldiers, including 4 high rank officers, killed according to French Army sources

The siege of Aintab (French: Les Quatres Sièges d'Aïntab; Ottoman Turkish: عین تاب قوشاتماسى; Turkish: Antep Kuşatması) was a military engagement between the Turkish National Forces and the French Army of the Levant occupying the city of Aintab (present-day Gaziantep) during the Turkish War of Independence (specifically its southern front, known as the Franco-Turkish War).

Fighting began in April 1920, when French forces opened fire on the city. It ended with the Kemalist defeat and the city's surrender to the French military forces on 9 February 1921. However, despite a victory, the French ultimately decided to retreat from the city leaving it to Kemalist forces on 20 October 1921 in accordance with the Treaty of Ankara. According to Ümit Kurt, born in modern-day Gaziantep and an academic at Harvard's Center for Middle East Studies, the defense "seems to have been as much the organised struggle of a group of genocide profiteers seeking to hold onto their loot as it was a fight against an occupying force. The resistance…sought to make it impossible for the Armenian repatriates to remain in their native towns, terrorising them [again] in order to make them flee. In short, not only did the local…landowners, industrialists and civil-military bureaucratic elites lead to the resistance movement, but they also financed it in order to cleanse Aintab of Armenians".

== Timeline ==
=== 1920 ===
- 1 - 16 April: 1st Turkish siege
- 30 April - 23 May: 2nd Turkish siege
- 30 May - 18 June: 1920 armistice
- 29 July - 10 August: 3rd Turkish siege
- 11 August: beginning of French siege
- 21 November - 18 December: Goubeau column participation

=== 1921 ===
- 7 February: last exit attempt
- 8 February: sending of a city parliamentary mission - cease fire
- 9 February: capitulation
