= Selâhattin Köseoğlu =

Turkish politician

Selâhattin Köseoğlu 1314-P. 9
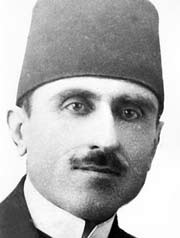
- Born: 1882; Mersin, Ottoman Empire
- Died: 6 October 1949 (aged 66–67); Ankara, Turkey
- Military career
- Allegiance: Ottoman Empire; Turkey
- Service years: Ottoman: January 1, 1898–1919; Turkey: July 1919 – September 20, 1923
- Rank: Miralay
- Commands: Vice President of the Military Academy, Chief of staff of the Inspectorate of the Rear Area of the First Army, Chief of staff of the II Corps, Chief of staff of the Southern Group, 10th Division, 5th Caucasian Division, II Caucasian Corps, IV Corps, General Inspector of Rear Area, Department of War, III Corps
- Conflicts: Balkan Wars; First World War; Turkish War of Independence
- Other work: Member of the GNAT (Mersin); İETT

Selâhattin Köseoğlu also known as Çolak Selâhattin, Hüseyin Selâhattin Bey (1882 – October 6, 1949) was a military officer of the Ottoman Army and the Turkish Army. He was also a politician of the Republic of Turkey.

== Life and career ==
Huseyin Selahattin Koseoglu served as a field commander in the Ottomans' wars of the 1910s. Early in the 1915 Gallipoli campaign, he first served as aide to Erich Weber, the corps commander for southern Gallipoli. In August 1915 he took command of a division in the southern army led by Wehib Pasha, which helped block a major attack by the British army.

After the Gallipoli campaign, Selahattin was promoted to corps command in the Ottoman army at Iraq, then led by Ali Ihsan. During the last stages of the First World War, he fought the British army that took control of Kirkuk. After the Ottoman defeat, Selahattin was moved to lead the Sivas corps. In 1919 he played a crucial role for the incipient resistance to the Entente occupation by protecting Kemal Ataturk in his revolt against the pro-Entente circles in the cabinet. Therefore, Ataturk was able to hold the Sivas Congress where the resistance was organized.

During the last stages of the Turkish Independence war, Selahattin joined the assembly in Ankara. However, he was critical of both the autocratic nature of Ataturk's leadership and also of Ataturk's secularist proclivities. Selahattin wanted a representative constitutional government with a strong assembly, and he also insisted that Islam was the major feature of Turkish character and culture that should not be changed.

At first Selahattin joined the opposition Progressive Republican party led by Kazim Karabekir, but after its ban he withdrew from public life. He died in 1949.

== Medals and decorations ==
- Medal of Independence with Red-Green Ribbon

== See also ==
- List of recipients of the Medal of Independence with Red-Green Ribbon (Turkey)
