= Ali Saip Ursavaş =

Turkish politician

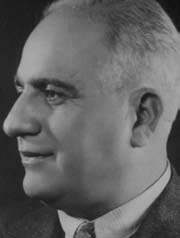
- Born: 1885; Rawanduz, Ottoman Empire
- Died: 25 September 1939 (aged 53–54); Adana, Turkey
- Burial place: Adana Asrî Mezarlığı
- Military career
- Allegiance: Ottoman Empire; Turkey
- Service years: Ottoman Empire: September 1, 1908–1919; Turkey: 1919–February 28, 1926
- Rank: Ottoma Empire: Captain; Turkey: Lieutenant colonel
- Commands: Mobile Detachment of the Drizur Gendarmerie Regiment, Kars Gendarmerie Command, Kozan Gendarmerie Command; Urfa Gendarmerie Command, Urfa Area Kuva-yi Milliye, member of the Konya Independence Tribunal, Independence Tribunal of the Riot Area
- Conflicts: Italo-Turkish War; Franco-Turkish War; First World War; Turkish War of Independence
- Other work: Member of the GNAT (Urfa)

Ali Saip Ursavaş, also known as Ali Saib Bey (1885, in Rowanduz – September 25, 1939 in Adana) was an Ottoman officer of Kurdish origin, having served in the Ottoman and Turkish armies, and one of the early key members of CHP.

== Career ==
He was a prominent politician of the Republic of Turkey. In 1925, he was nominated prosecutor at the Independence Tribunal in Diyarbakır which was established to counter the Sheikh Said Rebellion and sentenced Sheikh Said to death. Later, he succeeded Hacim Muhittin Çarıklı as the Tribunals president.

== Works ==
- Kilikya Faciaları ve Urfa Kurtuluş Mücadeleleri, Ankara, 1940.

== Medals and decorations ==
- Medal of Independence with Red-Green Ribbon

== See also ==
- List of recipients of the Medal of Independence with Red-Green Ribbon (Turkey)
- Battle of Urfa
