= Arslan Toğuz =

Turkish politician

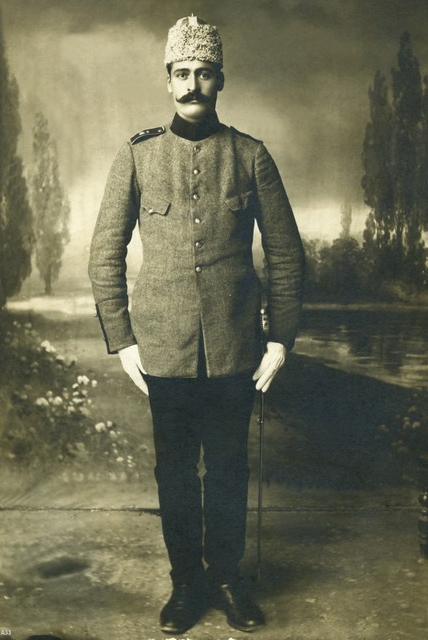

Member of the Turkish Grand National Assembly for Maraş
- In office May 17, 1920 – April 15, 1923

Personal details
- Born: 1886 Fındık, Göksun, Ottoman Empire
- Died: June 7, 1963 (aged 76–77) Pazarcık, Kahramanmaraş, Turkey
- Spouse: 1
- Children: 3
- Education: Elbistan elementary and junior high schools Medrese
- Committees: PTT
- Awards: Medal of Independence with Red-Green Ribbon

Military service
- Allegiance: Ottoman Empire
- Branch/service: Police
- Years of service: 1908-November 1918
- Rank: Baş Komiser
- Commands: Society for the Defence of Rights in Marash; Kuva-i Milliye of Marash
- Battles/wars: Turkish War of Independence; Franco-Turkish War; Battle of Marash

Arslan Toğuz also known as Arslan Pasha, Arslan Bey (1886; Göksun - June 7, 1963; Pazarcık) was a Turkish police commissioner of the Ottoman Empire, a militia leader and politician of Turkey.

He was born in the village of Fındık (in present-day Göksun district of Kahramanmaraş Province) as a son of Çerkez Hasanbeyzade Abdullah Bey.

== See also ==
- List of recipients of the Medal of Independence with Red-Green Ribbon (Turkey)
