= Hüsrev Gerede =

Turkish politician

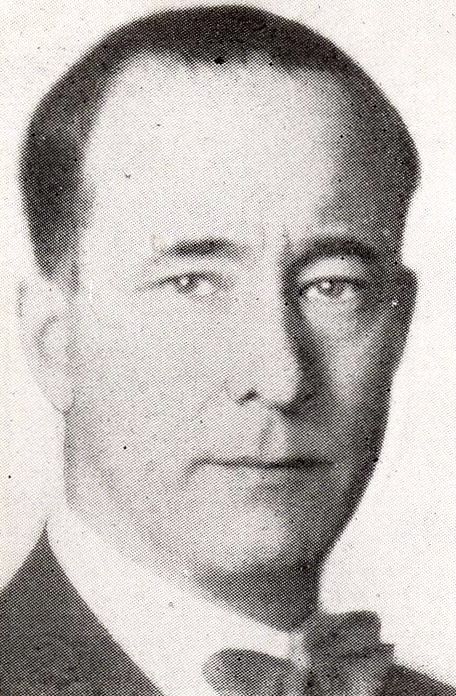
- Born: 1884; Edirne, Edirne Vilayet, Ottoman Empire
- Died: 20 March 1962 (aged 77–78); Istanbul, Turkey
- Military career
- Allegiance: Ottoman Empire; Turkey
- Service years: Ottoman Empire: July 13, 1903-1919; Turkey: May 19, 1919-October 9, 1928
- Rank: Colonel
- Conflicts: Balkan Wars; First World War; Turkish War of Independence
- Other work: Member of the GNAT (Trabzon); Member of the GNAT (Urfa); Ambassador to Tehran; Member of the GNAT (Sivas); Ambassador to Tokyo; Ambassador to Berlin; Ambassador to Rio de Janeiro

Hüsrev Gerede (1884 in Adrianople, Adrianople Vilayet – March 30, 1962 in Istanbul) was a Turkish diplomat and career officer, who served in the Ottoman Army and the Turkish Army.

== Biography ==
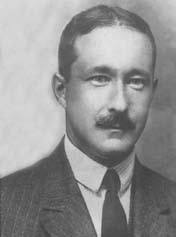
1920s portrait

His ancestors came from Bosnia-Herzegovina: his grandfather was Ali Pasha Rizvanbegović. He received his military education attending the Ottoman Military College and the Military Academy. After his graduation, he entered the Ottoman army and was deployed to the eastern provinces during the World War I. He was one of the early supporters of Mustafa Kemal (Atatürk) during the Turkish War of Independence and was a participant of both the Sivas and the Erzurum congress. He became a deputy of the Ottoman Parliament and after its dissolution as well of the Turkish Grand National Assembly. As in 1934 the surname law obliged all Turkish citizens to bear a surname, he chose Gerede. He was also a seasoned diplomat and was the Turkish ambassador to Romania from 1924 to 1926 and Nazi Germany from 1939 to 1942.

== Works ==
- Türk - Nippon Dostluğunun Sonsuz Hatıraları, Ertuğrul, 1937.
- Siyasî Hatıralarım, I inci İran, 1952.
- Mübarek Ertuğrul Şehitlerimiz ve Muhteşem Anıları, 1956.
- Harb İçinde Almanya, 1939-1942, İstanbul, 1994.

== Medals and decorations ==
- Medal of Independence with Red-Green Ribbon

== See also ==
- List of recipients of the Medal of Independence with Red-Green Ribbon (Turkey)
