= Fuat Umay =

Turkish politician

Mehmet Fuat Umay
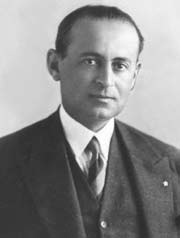

Member of the Grand National Assembly

Personal details
- Born: 1885 Kırklareli, Adrianople vilayet, Ottoman Empire
- Died: 1963 (aged 77–78) Istanbul
- Party: CHP

Mehmet Fuat Umay (1885 – 1963) was a Turkish physician, member of parliament, and politician, who was known to tour the United States after the Turkish War of Independence, in an attempt to raise donations for the orphans in Turkey.
