= Kahramanmaraş Sütçü İmam University =

Public university in Kahramanmaraş, Turkey

Coordinates: 37.5856°N 36.8212°E

- Motto: "Sürekli Öğrenmenin, Değişimin ve Geleceğin Adresi" (Turkish: "Address of Continuous Learning, Change and Future")
- Type: Public Research University
- Established: 1992
- President: İbrahim Taner Okumuş
- Faculty: 1.239
- Administrative staff: 3.100
- Students: 33.710 (all campuses)
- Undergraduates: 30.473
- Postgraduates: 3.237
- Location: Kahramanmaraş, Turkey
- Campus: Avsar Campus, Karacasu, Andırın, Afşin, Göksun, Pazarcık, Türkoğlu 2,566 acres (10.4 km^{2})
- Colors: Dark Blue, Red, White
- Mascot: Independence Medal of Kahramanmaraş
- Website: www.ksu.edu.tr

Kahramanmaraş Sütçü İmam University (KSU) is a public university founded 1992 in Kahramanmaraş, Turkey. The university carries out its academic activities in the campus located in the Avşar Campus, Bahçelievler, Karacasu, The Faculty of Medicine and Aksu campuses. Karacasu campus has an area of 100 hectares and Avşar campus, which is still under construction, will have an area of 1,300 hectares. 266 hectares of this area have been nationalized up to now.

It is named after Sütçü İmam.

== Academic units ==
There are totally 170 departments and programs; 45 departments including the second education program in 11 faculties and 12 in higher vocational schools, 93 programs in higher vocational schools, 17 departments in the Institute of Natural Sciences, 9 departments in the Institute of Social Sciences, 6 departments subordinated to the Rectorate.

=== Faculties ===
- Faculty of Agriculture
- Faculty of Education
- Faculty of Economics and Administrative Sciences
- Faculty of Engineering and Architecture
- Faculty of Fine Arts
- Faculty of Forest
- Faculty of Health Sciences
- Faculty of Literature
- Faculty of Medicine
- Faculty of Sciences
- Faculty of Theology

=== Graduate Schools ===
- Graduate School of Science and Technology
- Graduate School of Social Sciences
- Graduate School of Health Sciences

=== Schools ===
- School of Afşin Health
- School of Foreign Languages
- School of Göksun Applied Sciences
- School of Physical Education and Sports

=== Vocational Schools ===
- Afşin Vocational School
- Andırın Vocational School
- Goksun Vocational School
- Health Assistance Vocational School
- Pazarcık Vocational School
- Türkoğlu Vocational School
- Vocational School of Technical Sciences
- Vocational School of Social Sciences

=== Research Centers ===
- Oral And Dental Health Education Application And Research Center
- KSU Siyer-I Nebi Research Application and Research Center (SAMER)
- Atatürk's Principles And Revolution History Application And Research Center
- European Union Ar. And App. Central
- Computer Research and Application Center (BAUM)
- Prof. Dr. Nurettin KAŞKA Hard Shelled Fruit App. And Ar. MR. (SEKAMER)
- Strategic Research Center
- Biomedical Application and Research Center
- Environmental Problems Application And Research Center
- Agricultural Publication Research And Application Center
- University - Industry - Public Cooperation Development Application and Research Center
- Earthquake Research And Risk Management Center
- Eastern Mediterranean Archeology Application and Research Center (DOĞAKMER)
- Ecological Agriculture Application and Research Center (EKOTAUM)
- Animal Production Application and Research Center. (HAYMER)
- Research And Application Center Of Kahramanmaraş And Its Region Cultural Values
- Women's Studies Application and Research Center (KSÜKAM)
- Career And Entrepreneurship Application And Research Center (KAGİM)
- KSU Child Education Application and Research Center
- Distance Education Application and Research Center (UZEM)
- Turkish Teaching Application and Research Center (TÖMER)

=== Education Centers ===
- Continuing Education Center
- Distance Education Center
- Turkish Language Teaching Center
