= Franco-Turkish War =

War lasting from 1918 to 1921 during the Turkish War of Independence

Franco–Turkish War (1918–1921)
- Part of the Turkish War of Independence
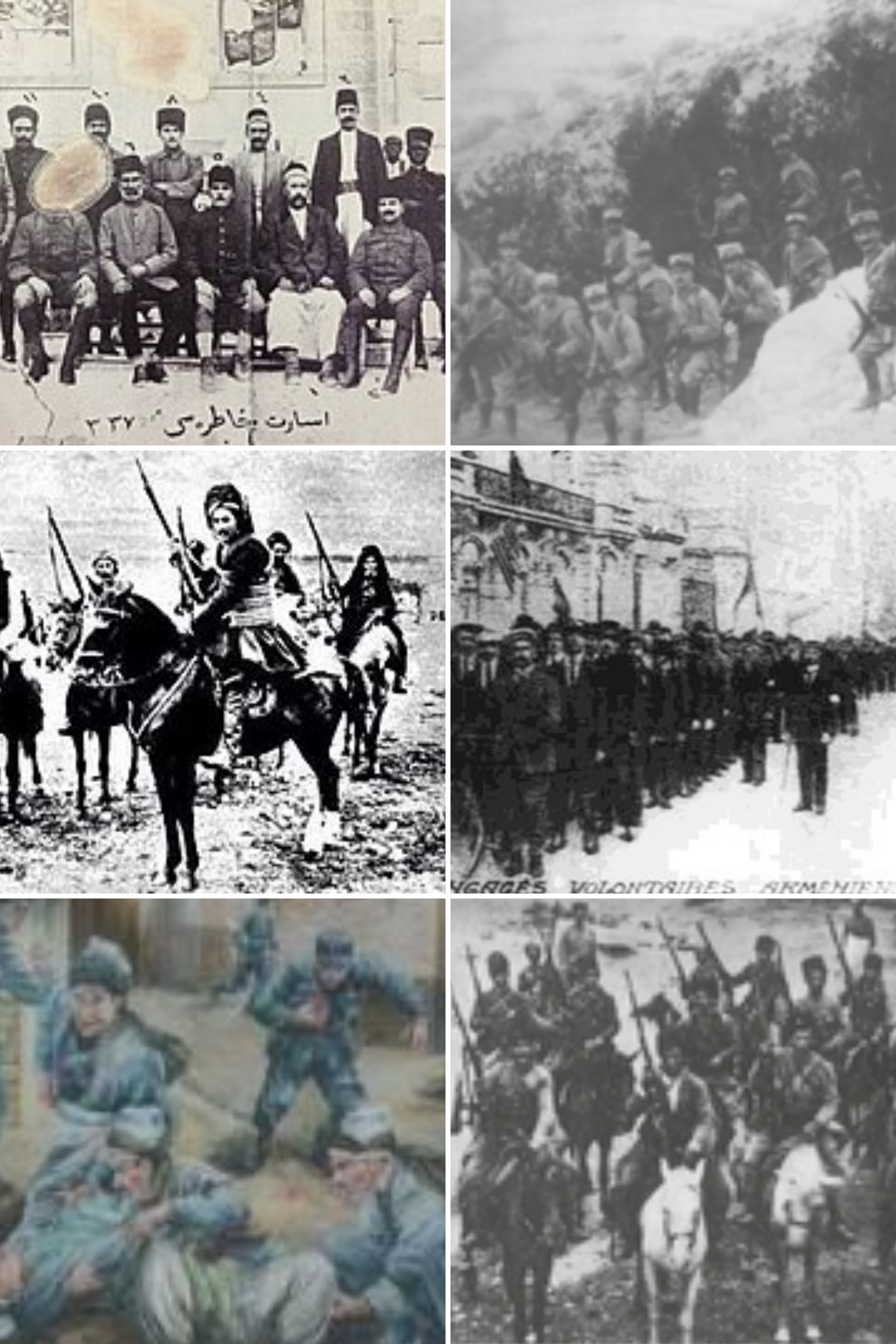
- Clockwise from top left: Turkish prisoners of war after the Siege of Aintab, volunteers of the French Armenian Legion, Turkish guerrillas in 1919, Sütçü İmam's shooting of a French soldier, and Turkish irregulars in Urfa.
Date	December 1918 – 20 October 1921
Location	Cilicia and southeastern Anatolia
Result	Turkish victory (Note: Attributed to the following sources: Thomas, Martin; Roye, Richard (2017). "The Chanak Crisis, 1922". Arguing about Empire: Imperial Rhetoric in Britain and France, 1882-1956. pp. 132–133. doi:10.1093/acprof:oso/9780198749196.001.0001. ISBN 9780191813382. Archived from the original on 19 October 2026. "The agreement reached on 20 October 1921 between chief French negotiator Henry Franklin-Bouillon and Youssef Kemal Bey, foreign minister and representative of the Ankara Grand National Assembly, ended a two-year war in the southern Anatolian region of Cilicia that marked the first outright defeat of French imperial arms since the loss of Quebec in 1763."; Wagner, Heather Lehr (2012). The Division of the Middle East: The Treaty of Sèvres. Chelsea House Publishers. p. 85. ISBN 978-0-7910-7831-0. "Finally, on October 21, 1921, France admitted defeat. It signed a treaty with the Turks, agreeing to give up its claims to Anatolia— in essence abandoning the Armenians to focus on Syria. France's decision marked a significant break among the Allies."; Guclu, Yucel (2010). "The Struggle for Mastery in Cilicia: Turkey, France, and the Ankara Agreement of 1921". The International History Review. 23 (3). Taylor & Francis: 580–603. doi:10.1080/07075332.2001.9640941. JSTOR 40108751. "Perhaps French scholars could find little to attract diem in an episode marked by failure; the struggle with Turkey over Cilicia tarnished the prestige of victorious France by marking the first French defeat in an imperial war since the loss of Canada in 1763."; Erickson, Edward J. (2021b). The Turkish War of Independence : A military History, 1919-1923. Bloomsbury Publishing. p. 172. ISBN 9781440878428. "In the end, the Nationalist strategy against France worked because the French had not the resources to wage an endless war in Cilicia for undetermined objectives, inevitably forcing them to the negotiating table. Kemal and the new Nationalist government achieved a decisive victory at low cost, which enabled them to concentrate their strength in the west."; Saribekyan, K. (2026). "HISTORICAL PERCEPTION OF CILICIA AND THE FRENCH MANDATE SYSTEM IN THE INTERWAR PERIOD, 1918–1939". Global Armenian Studies Department: 286–293. doi:10.24412/cl-37384-2025-1-286-293. "The Franco-Turkish war of 1920-1921 ended with the defeat of the French army by Turkish nationalists led by Mustafa Kemal Ataturk. They signed the Treaty of Ankara (or Franklin-Bouillon Agreement), which led to the withdrawal of the French troops from Cilicia and "humanitarian evacuation" of Armenians, who found there a new home after Genocide of 1915."; Katsanis, Georgios (2026). "The Road to Lausanne". The Treaty of Lausanne: Impacts on Affected Countries in Europe and the Middle East, 1923–2023. Contributions to International Relations. Springer Nature. pp. 49–68. doi:10.1007/978-981-95-9611-9. ISBN 978-981-95-9611-9. "The Franco-Turkish war of 1920-1921 ended with the defeat of the French army by Turkish nationalists led by Mustafa Kemal Ataturk."; Weisiger, Alex (2013). Logics of war: Explanations for limited and unlimited conflicts. Cornell University Press. p. 191. doi:10.7591/cornell/9780801451867.001.0001. ISBN 9780801468179. JSTOR 10.7591/j.ctt1xx5pk. OCLC 836207133. "Even given the tendency to overlook this complex of wars, however, the Franco-Turkish War constitutes a particular lacuna in existing scholarship, overshadowed by the French actions in Syria and especially by the Greco-Turkish War. That said, the Franco-Turkish War was an essential part of the broader Turkish independence struggle, while for the French it constituted an embarrassing defeat whose costs exacerbated the country's economic difficulties and contributed to the financial crises of the mid-1920s.")

Belligerents
France: French Armenian Legion; French West Africa; Algeria; Morocco; French Tunisia	Ankara Government: Kuva-yi Milliye

Commanders and leaders
(French Third Republic) Henri Gouraud	Ali Fuat Pasha; Ali Saip Bey "Kılıç" Ali Bey; Şefik "Özdemir" Bey; Şahin Bey †

Strength
(French Third Republic) February 1920: up to 12,000; March 1920: 25,000–30,000; May 1920: c. 40,000; February 1921: 70,000; Overall: 80,000 troops	25,000–30,000 nationalist forces

Casualties and losses
(French Third Republic) 5,000 killed	Unknown
- 20,000–50,000 Armenian civilians killed

The Franco–Turkish War, called the Cilicia Campaign (French: campagne de Cilicie) in France and the Southern Front (Turkish: Güney Cephesi) of the Turkish War of Independence in Turkey, was fought between French occupation troops and Turkish nationalist forces in Cilicia and southeastern Anatolia. The French occupation began after the Armistice of Mudros in 1918. Fighting intensified in late 1919 and ended with the Ankara Agreement of 20 October 1921.

The nationalists initially relied on local irregular bands, later joined by regular army units. They attacked French garrisons and supply routes and fought for control of several towns. French forces withdrew from Maraş and Urfa and lost a column at Karboğazı, but held Adana and other main positions. They captured Aintab in February 1921, and also successfully broke the local irregulars.

The French army was not decisively defeated. France, nevertheless, agreed to leave most of Cilicia. The government wanted to reduce military expenditure, secure its position in Syria and cultivate relations with Ankara, due to deteriorating French–British relations and the latter's support for Greece. The October agreement left France in control of its Syrian mandate, including Alexandretta, and gave Ankara most of the former French occupation zone. The evacuation prompted a large exodus of Armenians and other Christian inhabitants.

== Background ==
=== Postwar agreements and occupation ===
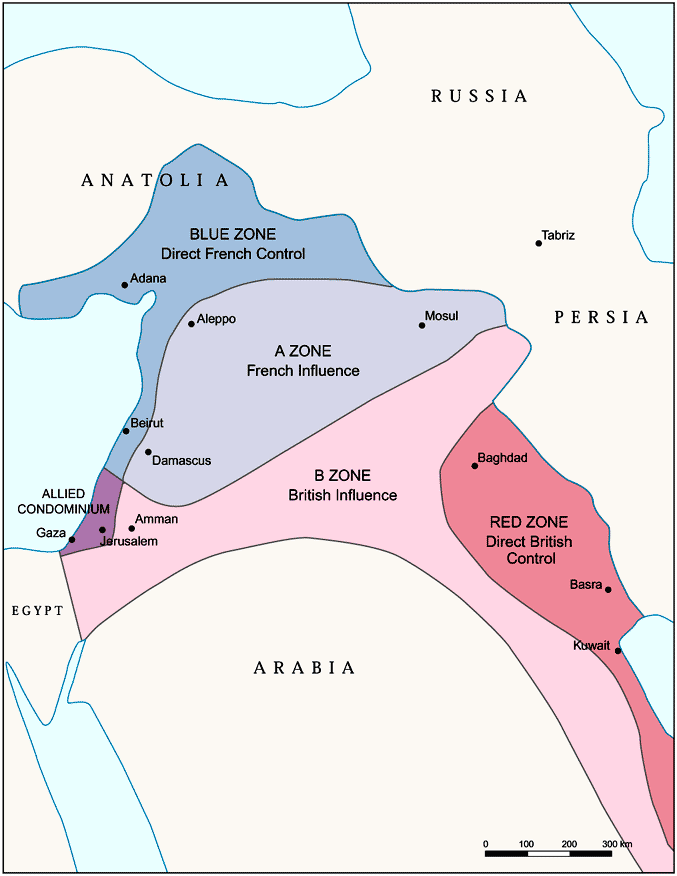
The secret Sykes–Picot Agreement of 1916

The Sykes–Picot Agreement of 1916 envisaged French influence in Ottoman Syria and Cilicia. The ports, railways and routes into northern Syria made the region valuable to France. British troops occupied much of Cilicia after the Ottoman armistice, but an Anglo-French agreement in September 1919 provided for their replacement. French reinforcements arrived the following month.

The population of Cilicia included Muslim Turks, Armenians and other communities. Many Armenians had been deported during the Armenian genocide. Survivors returned after the war, some expecting protection from the French occupation forces. Opposition to French rule among local Muslims, together with the return of Armenian refugees, contributed to mounting communal tensions.

The French force comprised metropolitan and colonial troops and the French Armenian Legion, recruited from Armenian volunteers and refugees. General Julien Dufieux commanded in Cilicia under Henri Gouraud, commander of the Army of the Levant. France also needed troops in Syria, where it was establishing its mandate.

=== Nationalist armed opposition ===
Armed opposition grew after the French replaced British troops in late 1919. A report by the Armenian Patriarchate stated that Kemal had ordered the organization of armed bands in 1919 and Turkish officers had been sent into Cilicia. Truly, in November, Mustafa Kemal sent Kılıç Ali to the Maraş district to organize armed groups. Ankara supplied weapons and ammunition to local fighters, many of them former soldiers. The French referred to these irregular bands as tchétés (çetes). They attacked French convoys and Armenian civilians as well as military posts.

In 1921 the French military officer Pierre-Jean-Daniel André (pseudonym Pierre Redan) described an incursion by what he estimated to be 2,000–3,000 Kemalist irregulars. He claimed that they compelled villagers to enlist, provide money and supply food and livestock. His estimate concerned the forces involved in the operations he described.

A British War Office report dated 15 March 1920 expected the nationalists to rely on guerrilla attacks and raids against isolated Allied posts. It warned that such fighting could make the occupation costly by disrupting communications and forcing the Allies to maintain scattered garrisons.

== French occupation of Anatolia ==
=== Black Sea and western Anatolia ===
French troops held positions outside Cilicia as well. In March 1919 French warships landed men at Zonguldak and Karadeniz Ereğli to secure the coalfields. They later left Ereğli but remained at Zonguldak. Other French units served in the Allied occupation of Constantinople and briefly occupied part of the Mudanya–Bursa railway. In February 1920 General Louis Franchet d'Espèrey withdrew the railway detachment to Constantinople to avoid another clash with Turkish nationalists.

=== Cilicia campaign ===
The first nationalist attacks were led mainly by local militias, but regular units joined the fighting. The Turkish 11th Infantry Division operated in the Taurus Mountains, and regular troops also fought around Adana and Urfa. In early 1920 the nationalists tried to cut the roads and railways linking Adana with Mersin and Syria.

Major engagements
Engagement	Dates	Outcome
Battle of Marash	January–February 1920	French evacuation
Battle of Urfa	February–April 1920	French withdrawal. French soldiers massacred after Turkish breach of safe conduct
Karboğazı ambush	May 1920	Surrender of a French column
Siege of Aintab	1920–1921	French capture of Aintab in February 1921

==== Maraş and Urfa ====
Raids on the roads around Maraş developed into a siege of the town in January 1920. General Quérette's French garrison had difficulty receiving supplies and communicating with other French units. Lieutenant Colonel Robert Normand led a relief column into the town, but the French commanders decided they could not hold it with the routes still threatened. They evacuated Maraş on the night of 10–11 February, taking several thousand Armenian civilians with them. Many Armenians remained behind and suffered massacres during and after the fighting. Some of the besiegers had sought a ceasefire shortly before the withdrawal, but the evacuation nonetheless gave the nationalists control of Maraş.

At Urfa, Ali Saip Bey commanded Turkish, Kurdish and Arab fighters against a garrison of French troops. The siege began in February 1920. French relief forces encountered regular Turkish troops, and the garrison eventually agreed to withdraw in April. The Turks then breached safe conduct, with most of the French soldiers getting massacred when the departing column was attacked, while the survivors were taken prisoner.

==== Adana campaign and the Taurus passes ====
The nationalists also tried to cut Adana off from Mersin and Syria by occupying the railways through the Taurus Mountains. The Turkish 11th Infantry Division joined the advance. A French battalion under Major Mesnil resisted attacks at Pozantı, but attempts to relieve it failed. Mesnil tried to break out in May and surrendered after his column was ambushed near Karboğazı.

The French still held Adana. The defence of Pozantı and other posts had delayed the nationalist advance long enough to prevent a concentrated attack on the city. Under a truce concluded in June 1920, French troops left exposed positions and strengthened their hold on the main towns and railway. The truce also gave Ankara an opportunity to send men to the front against Greece and to operations against Armenia.

==== Summer fighting and siege of Aintab ====
Fighting resumed during the summer. Nationalist bands raided railways, bridges and convoys, making travel between French positions hazardous. The French nevertheless defeated nationalist troops in several open engagements. Their position improved as Gouraud established French control of Syria and could devote more attention to the Cilician front.

French troops counterattacked near Aintab and continued their siege of the town. They broke a Turkish offensive in October 1920, and further nationalist attacks in November made little progress. Aintab surrendered on 9 February 1921. Guévork Gotikian describes repeated nationalist failures outside the town before the surrender and calls its capture a French victory that came too late to change the government's policy toward Ankara. By then, the nationalists held much of the northern and western countryside, whereas Adana, Alexandretta and Aintab remained under French control.

Other French counterattacks also succeeded. André Mandelstam, drawing on the account of French commander Édouard Brémond, wrote that Colonel Gracy's column retook Yenice, relieved Tarsus and reopened the route to Mersin in July 1920. The siege of Adana was lifted on 19 August.

=== Fighting in the Alexandretta district ===
In the Sanjak of Alexandretta, the nationalist guerrilla campaign began later than it did farther north. An attack on Beylan (now Belen) on 4 September 1920 failed. Irregular bands remained active through the autumn, but French attacks in the winter of 1920–1921 brought the armed opposition in this district to an end.

=== Military outcome ===
The fighting ranged from sieges and conventional engagements to raids on isolated posts and transport links. Turkish irregulars were able to make the French occupation of the countryside difficult, but they could not take the principal French bases. France could easily defeat nationalist troops in open battle, but lacked enough men to protect every road, railway and outpost. Maintaining control of the whole region would have required a larger French force.

Historian Andrew Orr argues that the nationalists' failure to capture the main French positions in 1920 cost them their best chance of an operational victory. French control of Syria was growing stronger, and Ankara had to commit forces against Greece and Armenia. In Alexandretta, the failed attack on Beylan and the French winter offensive had already ended nationalist armed opposition in that district.

Edward J. Erickson writes that Mustafa Kemal could not win a military victory over France. Historian Ousseynou Faye calls the Franco-Turkish agreement of 10 March 1921 a confirmation of French military victory, although that provisional agreement never took effect. Major T. E. Compton, writing in 1922, called the campaign an "ultimate French victory", militarily.

== Negotiations and end of hostilities ==
French representatives began discussions with the Turkish nationalists before the fighting ended. At the London conference in February 1920, diplomat Philippe Berthelot said that France did not intend to remain permanently in Cilicia. He proposed returning it to Turkish suzerainty while preserving some French control.

The government had other priorities. The occupation of Cilicia was expensive, while France was still establishing its rule in Syria and faced financial pressures at home, including the dispute over German reparations. Britain supported Greece in the war against Ankara, and relations between the Allies were strained by their competing interests in the Near East. France wanted a workable frontier with Turkish-controlled territory and hoped to retain commercial access to the region.

A preliminary agreement reached in London in March 1921 was never implemented. In correspondence that month, Prime Minister Aristide Briand opposed proposals that might delay a settlement. General Gouraud objected to Turkish demands that he believed would endanger French equipment and civilians connected to the occupation.

French military commanders did not necessarily share Paris's preference for an agreement. Generals who wanted to attack the nationalist forces when they were under pressure were actually denied political and diplomatic support. The French government instead pursued negotiations, despite the army's ability to hold the principal towns.

After Briand formed his government in early 1921, French negotiators sought a frontier that would secure Syria and allow France to maintain its economic and cultural interests in Turkey. The withdrawal also formed part of a longer dispute over French rule along the Turkish–Syrian frontier and the treatment of the region's minorities.

Henry Franklin-Bouillon negotiated directly with Mustafa Kemal, and the Ankara Agreement was signed on 20 October 1921. France undertook to evacuate most of Cilicia, and Ankara accepted French authority over Syria and the Sanjak of Alexandretta. A joint commission organized the withdrawal and transfer of the towns to Turkish administration.

France surrendered areas its soldiers still held. Ankara, in turn, gave up claims to land south of the new frontier that had been included in the National Pact. Orr describes the agreement as a compromise that favoured the Turkish nationalists. It also left France pursuing a separate policy from its wartime Allies.

France expected concessions in return for its withdrawal. The agreement provided for special administrative arrangements in Alexandretta, while accompanying letters dealt with railway interests and possible mining concessions for French firms. These economic arrangements helped Paris justify the agreement, but they were less immediate than the territorial gains obtained by Ankara.

Some French writers accused their government of abandoning Cilicia unnecessarily. Reviewing Paul du Véou's La Passion de la Cilicie in 1938, Raymond Janin argued that earlier action could have prevented French withdrawals and blamed concessions to Ankara for weakening the army's position. Michel Paillarès, an outspoken opponent of Kemalism, made a similar criticism in 1922, arguing that French policy had allowed the nationalist insurgency to grow.

== Atrocities ==
In March 1920, up to 12,000 Armenians were killed during and after the fighting at Maraş in January and February 1920. Several thousand escaped with the departing French troops, but many remained in the town. Armenian civilians had also been attacked before the siege. American missionaries reported the killing of men, women and children during the fighting. Some young Armenian women were abducted and bodies were burned to conceal sexual violence.

From March to October 1920, Turkish nationalist forces besieged Hadjin, whose Armenian population consisted largely of survivors who had returned after the Armenian genocide. The town fell in mid-October, and most of its Armenian inhabitants, nearly 8,000, were massacred, with only a few hundred escaping to Adana.

Elsewhere in Cilicia, raids, reprisals, looting and attacks on civilians forced inhabitants to leave their homes. Turkish fighters also tortured or mutilated wounded French soldiers and prisoners and disturbed graves.

== French withdrawal ==
French troops left the main towns in late 1921 and the first week of January 1922, following the Ankara Agreement. A Franco-Turkish commission supervised the handover and dealt with commercial matters, abandoned property and the status of minority residents.

== Aftermath ==
France could now devote its troops and resources to Syria. Ankara obtained most of Cilicia and could redirect forces to other fronts, particularly against Greece. The separate French agreement weakened Allied cooperation over the postwar settlement of the Ottoman Empire.

France also supplied military equipment to the Turkish nationalists and negotiations about them were held in late 1921 and January 1922. British officials objected, and French officials were concerned that the equipment might be used against Greece. The matériel approved in January 1922 included 10,000 Mauser rifles, 2,000 horses, 10,000 uniforms and ten aircraft. Other contemporary reports gave different quantities. France also supplied Ankara with arms and military equipment free of charge.

=== Consequences ===
==== For Greece ====
Several historians have condemned France's separate agreement with Ankara for its consequences for Greece. British historian Douglas Dakin described the conduct of France and Italy as "treachery", arguing that Greece was left fighting in Anatolia alone, while Britain also pursued an indecisive policy. U.S. Army officer Jason B. Faulkenberry similarly wrote that Greece had been "betrayed" by France and Italy, citing their separate agreements with the nationalists and supplies of arms. In a 2023 review of the historiography, historian Michael Llewellyn-Smith noted that historians had blamed the French and Italian governments for "breaking ranks and settling with Kemal".

==== For Armenian civilians ====
Many Armenians feared renewed violence under nationalist rule and left with the French. At first, the French authorities tried to discourage their departure, partly because of the pressure refugees would place on Syria. Thousands travelled toward Mersin and Dörtyol. In December 1921 France organized ships to evacuate tens of thousands of Armenian civilians. However, many were left behind and, after January 1922, prohibited from fleeing to French-ruled Syria.

Herbert Adams Gibbons accused France of acting like Germany during the Armenian genocide, stating that it tolerated massacres of Armenians and Greeks while simultaneously negotiating with Kemal. Historian Aurore Bruna also criticized the withdrawal for leaving Cilicia's Christian inhabitants without the protection they had expected from France.

==== For France ====
Contrary to French expectations, the expected economic partnership with Turkey failed to develop and the Ankara government later created difficulties for French rule in Syria.

== See also ==
- Timeline of the Turkish War of Independence
- French Armenian Legion
- Treaty of Ankara (1921)
- Greco-Turkish War (1919–1922)
- France–Turkey relations

== Bibliography ==
- Rose, John D. (1973). British Policy and the Turkish Question, 1918–1923 (PDF) (MA thesis). McGill University.
- Güçlü, Yücel (2001). "Turco-French Struggle for Mastery in Cilicia and the Ankara Agreement of 1921". Belleten. 65 (244): 1079–1114. doi:10.37879/belleten.2001.1079.
- Zürcher, Erik Jan (2004). Turkey: A Modern History. I.B. Tauris. ISBN 9781850433996.
- Morris, Benny; Ze'evi, Dror (2019). The Thirty-Year Genocide: Turkey's Destruction of Its Christian Minorities, 1894–1924. Harvard University Press. ISBN 9780674916456.
- Morris, Benny (2025). "Collective Sexual Violence in Turkey, 1894–1924: What We Know and How We Know It". Law and History Review. 43 (2): 259–278. doi:10.1017/S0738248025101120.
- Bruna, Aurore (2008). "La France, les Français face à la Turquie : autour de l'accord d'Angora du 20 octobre 1921" (PDF). Bulletin de l'Institut Pierre Renouvin (in French) (27): 27–41. doi:10.3917/bipr.027.0027.
- Compton, T. E. (1922). "The French Campaign of 1920–21 in Cilicia". Royal United Services Institution Journal. 67 (465): 68–79. doi:10.1080/03071842209420184.
- Janin, Raymond (1938). "Véou (Paul de), La Passion de la Cilicie (1919–1922)". Échos d'Orient (in French). 37 (191–192): 477–478.
- Erickson, Edward J. (2021). The Turkish War of Independence: A Military History, 1919–1923. Praeger. ISBN 9781440878411.
- Faye, Ousseynou (2018). Les tirailleurs sénégalais entre le Rhin et la Méditerranée (1908–1939): Parcours d'une aristocratie de la baïonnette (in French). L'Harmattan. ISBN 9782343140810.
- Gotikian, Guévork (1999). "La Légion d'Orient et le mandat français en Cilicie (1916–1921)". Revue d'histoire arménienne contemporaine (in French). 3: 251–329.
- Hovannisian, Richard G. (1996). The Republic of Armenia: From London to Sèvres, February–August 1920. Vol. 3. University of California Press. ISBN 9780520088030.
- Kévorkian, Raymond (2023). Parachever un génocide: Mustafa Kemal et l'élimination des rescapés arméniens et grecs (1918–1922) (in French). Paris: Odile Jacob. ISBN 9782415006617.
- Mandelstam, André (1926). La Société des Nations et les Puissances devant le problème arménien (in French). A. Pédone.
- Mourelos, Giannis G. (1983). "Η γαλλοτουρκική προσέγγιση του 1921: Το σύμφωνο Franklin-Bouillon και η εκκένωση της Κιλικίας". Δελτίο Κέντρου Μικρασιατικών Σπουδών (in Greek). 4: 211–276. doi:10.12681/deltiokms.40.
- Nakache, Karen (1998). "Un cas de migration forcée : les Arméniens de Cilicie en 1921". Cahiers de la Méditerranée (in French). 56: 109–130. doi:10.3406/camed.1998.1219.
- Paillarès, Michel (1922). Le Kémalisme devant les Alliés (in French). Édition du Bosphore.
- Orr, Andrew (2020). "The Cilician War (1919–1921): The Franco-Turkish War After the Great War". In Baev, Jordan; Minchev, Dimitar (eds.). Acta 2019: Unsettled Problems After the 1919 Peace Conference (PDF). Veles Publishing. pp. 221–232. ISBN 9789543020881.
- Redan, Pierre (1921). La Cilicie et le problème ottoman (PDF) (in French). Gauthier-Villars.
- Sahakyan, R. G. (1986). Франко-турецкие отношения и Киликия в 1918–1923 гг [Franco-Turkish Relations and Cilicia in 1918–1923] (in Russian). Yerevan: Publishing House of the Academy of Sciences of the Armenian SSR.
- Tachjian, Vahé (2004). La France en Cilicie et en Haute-Mésopotamie: Aux confins de la Turquie, de la Syrie et de l'Irak (1919–1933) (in French). Karthala. ISBN 9782845864412.
- White, Benjamin Thomas (2019). "A Grudging Rescue: France, the Armenians of Cilicia, and the History of Humanitarian Evacuations" (PDF). Humanity. 10 (1): 1–27. doi:10.1353/hum.2019.0000.
- Yerasimos, Stéphane (1988). "Le sandjak d'Alexandrette: formation et intégration d'un territoire". Revue de l'Occident musulman et de la Méditerranée (in French). 48–49: 198–212. doi:10.3406/remmm.1988.2237.
- Dakin, Douglas (1977). "The Formation of the Greek State: Political Developments Until 1923". In Koumoulides, John T. A. (ed.). Greece in Transition: Essays in the History of Modern Greece, 1821–1974 (PDF). London: Zeno Booksellers & Publishers. ISBN 0722800134.
- Faulkenberry, Jason B. (2012). The 1923 Greco-Turkish Population Exchange: Successful Prevention of Genocide and Mass Atrocities (Master of Military Art and Science). Fort Leavenworth: U.S. Army Command and General Staff College.
- Llewellyn-Smith, Michael (2023). "The historiography of the Greek-Turkish War in Asia Minor: Britain, Greece, and others, 1915–1923". Byzantine and Modern Greek Studies. 47 (2): 271–289. doi:10.1017/byz.2023.16.
