= Ali Kılıç =

Turkish politician

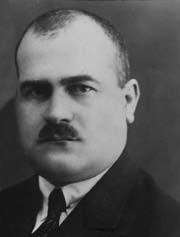
- Born: 1890; Constantinople, Ottoman Empire
- Died: 14 July 1971 (aged 80–81); Istanbul, Turkey
- Burial place: Zincirlikuyu Mezarlığı
- Military career
- Allegiance: Ottoman Empire; Turkey
- Service years: Ottoman Empire: March 3, 1906-April 2, 1919; Turkey: October 28, 1919-June 7, 1934
- Rank: Colonel
- Commands: Aide-de-camps of Nuri Pasha in the Army of Islam (Ottoman Empire); Kuva-yi Milliye of Marash, Aintab and its area
- Conflicts: First World War; Turkish War of Independence
- Other work: Member of the GNAT (Gaziantep); Member of the administrative board of the Türkiye İş Bankası

Ali Kılıç or Kılıç Ali Bey (born as Suleiman Asaf, 1890; Constantinople – July 14, 1971; Istanbul) was a Turkish officer of the Ottoman Army and Turkish Army. He was also a politician of the Republic of Turkey. He married with Füreya Koral, one of the first Turkish ceramicists. He was appointed a judge of the Independence Tribunal in the mid 1920s. Football coach Gündüz Kılıç was his son.

== Medals and decorations ==
- Medal of Independence with Red-Green Ribbon

== See also ==
- List of recipients of the Medal of Independence with Red-Green Ribbon (Turkey)
- Siege of Aintab
