= Cevat Abbas Gürer =

Turkish politician

Mehmet Cevat Abbas Gürer
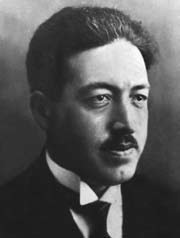
- Born: 1887; Niš, Kingdom of Serbia (present-day Serbia)
- Died: July 4, 1943 (aged 55–56); Yalova, Turkey
- Burial place: Adana Asrî Mezarlığı
- Military career
- Allegiance: Ottoman Empire; Turkey
- Service years: Ottoman Empire: September 1, 1908–1919; Turkey: 1919–February 27, 1927
- Rank: Ottoman Empire: Captain; Turkey: Lieutenant colonel
- Conflicts: First World War; Turkish War of Independence
- Other work: Member of the GNAT (Bolu)

Mehmet Cevat Abbas Gürer (1887 – July 4, 1943) was an officer of the Ottoman Army, the Turkish Army, and a politician of the Republic of Turkey. He was the chief aide of Atatürk, the founder of Türkiye and the first president.

== Works ==
- Ebedi Şef Kurtarıcı Atatürk'ün Zengin Tarihinden Bir Kaç Yaprak, İstanbul Halk Basımevi, İstanbul, 1939.

== Medals and decorations ==
- Medal of Independence with Red-Green Ribbon

== See also ==
- List of recipients of the Medal of Independence with Red-Green Ribbon (Turkey)
