= French Armenian Legion =

Eastern Legion / Armenian Legion
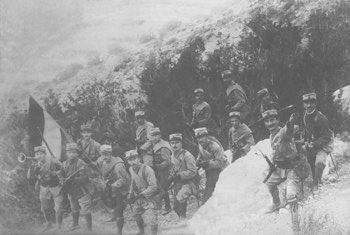
- Active: 1916–1920
- Country: France
- Size: Six battalions (1916)
- Engagements: First World War; Sinai and Palestine Campaign; Turkish War of Independence; Franco-Turkish War

Commanders
- Notable commanders: Commandant Louis Romieu

The Armenian Legion (French: Légion Arménienne; Armenian: ֆրանսիական Հայկական Լեգիոն) was a volunteer unit that was raised by the Allied Powers to serve in the Middle East Theatre during World War I. Trained and led by French army commanders, the Légion d'Orient (Eastern Legion), as the unit was originally known, was created in 1916, its ranks chiefly drawn from Levantine and Armenian exiles and refugees from the Ottoman Empire. In 1919, it was renamed the Légion Arménienne (Armenian Legion).

== Background ==
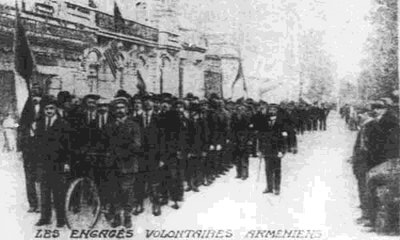
Early in the war, Armenians living in France enlisted in the French Foreign Legion

The establishment of an Armenian fighting force was first proposed by Boghos Nubar, the head of the Armenian National Delegation in Paris, during the landing of Allied forces to Alexandretta (İskenderun) in 1914, to British military planners. The British government rejected the plan, on the basis that such a plan would lead to the massacres of local Armenians. However, appeals by the Armenian National Defense Committee continued into 1915. French authorities also rejected the plan at the end of 1915. In 1916, British and French authorities revisited the idea of forming an Armenian unit within the Allied armies in the Middle East, not least due to the British burden in hosting Armenian refugees from Musa Dagh at Port Said in Egypt. The French military agreed to shoulder the costs of training and arming such a fighting force and began preparations. Boghos Nubar and other Armenian leaders in turn expressed some hesitation, but by October of that year came around the idea of supporting the Allied initiative and signed an agreement to that effect. The decision to form the legion became possible only after Britain and France settled their designs over the region in the Sykes-Picot Agreement.

== Establishment ==
Negotiations of Boghos Nubar with French political and military authorities culminated in the formation of the French Armenian Legion.

The Legion was established officially in Cairo, Egypt in November 1916, with the accord of the French Ministry of Foreign Affairs and an Armenian delegation. Several Armenian organizations pledged contributions to form several battalions under the planned Armenian Legion.

The parties agreed to the following:

- The aim of creating the Legion was to allow Armenians' contribution to the liberation of the Cilicia region in the Ottoman Empire and to help them to realize their national aspirations of creating a state in that region.
- The Legion was to fight only Turks and only in Cilicia.
- The Legion was to become the core of a planned future Armenian Army.

=== Initial plans ===
Signed in Paris by General Pierre Roques, Minister of War, and General Marie-Jean-Lucien Lacaze, Minister of Navy, the official decision regarding the establishment of the Armenian Legion was signed on 15 November 1916 in Paris.

According to this initial decision,

- The Eastern Legion was to be stationed in Cyprus
- Armenians and Syrians of Ottoman nationality would be permitted to volunteer
- The Legion would be commanded by French officers
- Volunteers for the Legion would have an equivalent status compared to French soldiers and would be under the responsibility of the French War Ministry
- Major Louis Romieu would supervise the establishment of the Legion
- The Legion was to be deployed in Cilicia, on the southeastern coast of Asia Minor (modern Turkey)
- 10,000 Francs were to be allocated from the war budget of the French Navy to use in the establishment of camps
- The volunteers were to be organized by local Armenian committees and sent to Bordeaux and Marseille. The committees were to be reimbursed by French government for travel expenses.

== Order of Battle, 1916–1918 ==
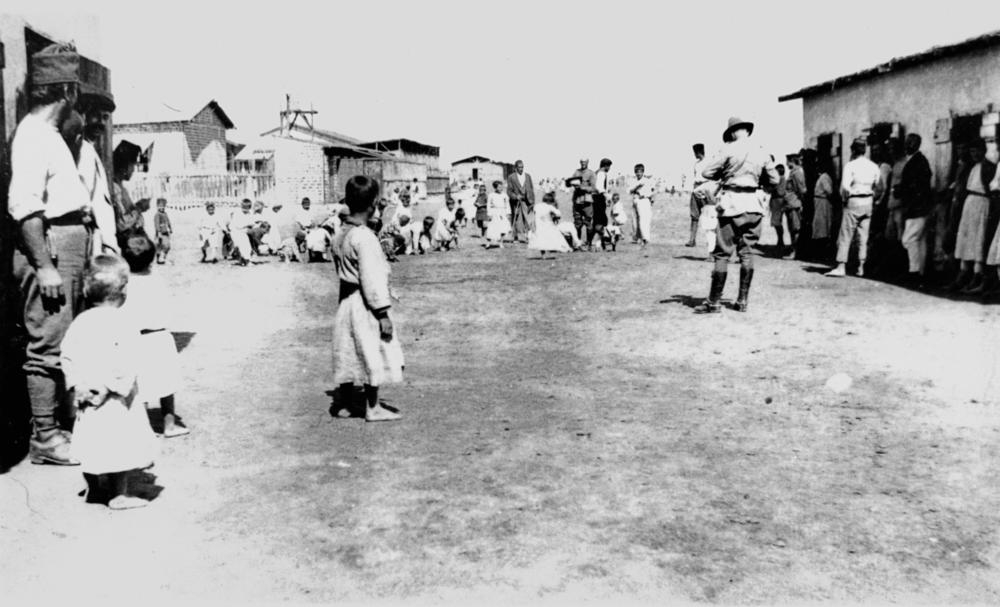
Soldier from the 5th Light Horse Regiment at the Armenian Camp in Port Said

The number of volunteers was an equivalent of 6 battalions, each containing 800 volunteers, and another 6 battalions were planned to be formed. Armenian committees were organizing to recruit these soldiers in France and the United States.

The Legion included Ottoman Armenian refugees, former prisoners of war, and permanent residents of Egypt, America, and Europe, and was 95% Armenian in composition. The majority of the soldiers were said to be recruited from the Armenian-American community or survivors of the battle of Musa Dagh who were living in refugee camps in Port Said, Egypt, at the time.

After the initial training in Cyprus, the Armenian Legion joined the Détachement Français de Palestine et de Syrie, taking part in the Sinai and Palestine campaign against the Ottoman army and its German ally. The two battalions of the legion were supplemented by an Infantry company of recruits from Syria and a platoon of two 37mm infantry guns.

Under the command of General Edmund Allenby, the Legion, fighting in Palestine, Syria, and, finally, Cilicia, won the plaudits of Clemenceau’s government and its Entente allies. The Armenian Legion assisted the British and French in winning the decisive Battle of Arara and has been credited with making General Allenby's victory possible.

== Order of Battle, 1920–1921 ==
Following this campaign, the Armenian Legion was deployed in Anatolia (Asia Minor) according to the initial decisions. They were active around the cities of Adana and Mersin and involved in skirmishes with local civilians and unorganized Turkish militia.

== See also ==
- Armenian Legion (disambiguation)
- Franco-Armenian relations
- French Foreign Legion
