= William Bell =

William or Willie Bell may refer to:

== Arts and entertainment ==
- William Bell (artist) (1735–1794), English portrait painter
- William Bell (architect) (1789–1865), Scottish-born architect who practiced in North Carolina
- William Bell (photographer) (1830–1910), English-born American photographer
- William Henry Bell (1873–1946), English composer
- William John Bell (1902–1971), American tuba player and teacher
- William J. Bell (producer) (1927–2005), American writer and producer of TV soap operas
- William Bell (singer) (born 1939), American soul singer and songwriter
- William Bell (author) (1945–2016), Canadian young adult fiction author
- William Brent Bell (born 1980), American film director
- William Bell (Fringe), character from the 2008–2013 TV series Fringe

== Politics and law ==
=== United Kingdom ===
- William Bell (MP for Carlisle), MP for Carlisle in 1416
- William Bell (lawyer) (c. 1538–1598), English lawyer
- William Bell (apothecary) (died 1668), English apothecary and politician who sat in the House of Commons
- Cory Bell (William Cory Heward Bell, 1875–1961), British MP for Devizes
- Billy Bell (politician) (William Bradshaw Bell, 1935–2020), Northern Irish Ulster Unionist Party politician

=== United States ===
- William Bell Jr. (politician) (1828–1902), American politician from Ohio
- William H. Bell (Wisconsin politician) (1863–1937), American politician from Wisconsin
- William A. Bell (born 1949), mayor of Birmingham, Alabama
- Bill Bell (mayor) (William V. Bell), mayor of Durham, North Carolina
- Bill Bell (West Virginia politician) (William Bell), member of the West Virginia House of Delegates

=== Other countries ===
- William R. Bell (1876–1927), Australian colonial District Officer in the Solomon Islands, assassinated
- William Henry Dillon Bell (1884–1917), New Zealand politician
- William Henry Bell (businessman) (fl. 1930s), British businessman and politician in Hong Kong
- William F. Bell (1938–2013), Canadian politician; mayor of Richmond Hill, Ontario
- William Montgomerie Bell (1813–1867), merchant and politician in colonial Victoria, Australia

== Religion ==
- William Bell (bishop) (died 1343), Scottish Bishop of St Andrews
- William Bell (priest) (1625–1683), English archdeacon of St Albans and sermon writer
- William Bell (field preacher) (fl. 1670s), Scottish minister and prisoner on the Bass Rock
- William Bell (theologian) (1731–1816), English theologian
- William Bell (clergyman) (1780–1857), Scottish-born Presbyterian minister in Upper Canada
- William Yancy Bell (1887–1962), American bishop for the Christian Methodist Episcopal Church

== Sports ==
=== Association football (soccer) ===
- William Bell (Welsh footballer) (1860–1930), Welsh footballer
- William Bell (English footballer) (1905–1937), English footballer (Sheffield United, Grimsby Town, Hull City)
- Willie Bell (1937–2023), Scottish football player and manager
- Bill Bell (businessman) (William Thomas Bell, 1932–2013), English businessman and football club chairman
- Billy Bell (footballer) (William John Bell, 1904–?), English footballer

=== Other sports ===
- William P. Bell (1886–1953), American golf course architect
- Billy Bell (ice hockey) (William Edward Bell, 1891–1952), Canadian ice hockey player
- William Bell (baseball) (1897–1969), American Negro league baseball pitcher and manager
- William M. Bell (1909–1991), American college football player and coach
- William Bell Jr. (baseball) (1930–2021), American Negro league baseball pitcher
- Whitey Bell (William Hoyet Bell, 1932–2025), American basketball player
- William Bell (American football) (born 1971), American football player
- William Lawrence Bell, Jr. (1924–2006), one of the creators of the racket sport pickleball
- Bill Bell (basketball) (William James Bell, 1927–2016), Canadian basketball player
- Bill Bell (baseball) (William Samuel Bell, 1933–1962), American baseball pitcher
- Bill Bell (cricketer) (William Bell, 1931–2002), New Zealand cricketer
- Bill Bell (American football) (William Stephen Bell, 1947–2022), American football placekicker
- Billy Bell (Canadian football) (William Hamilton Bell, 1923–2019), Canadian football player
- Willie Bell, Scottish judoka

== Others ==
- William Bell (railway architect) (1844–1919), born in York who designed the extension of Hull Paragon Interchange Station around 1900
- William Bell (East India Company), East India Company factor in Iran; his grave being the oldest British grave in Iran
- William Bell (Canadian businessman, born 1806) (1806–1844), Canadian businessman and militia officer
- William Nathaniel Bell (1817–1887), American pioneer; settled Seattle, Washington
- William Abraham Bell (1841–1921), English physician, land developer, and photographer of the American West; founder of Manitou Springs, Colorado
- William Augustus Bell (1882–1961), American businessman, educator, and president of Miles College in Alabama
- William Robert Bell (1845–1913), Canadian militia officer, farmer, and businessman
- William H. Bell (servant) (fl. 1860s), African-American servant of William Seward
- William Harrison Bell (1927–2016), American oral and maxillofacial surgeon
- William Dwane Bell (born 1978), New Zealand criminal
- William J. Bell (entomologist) (1943–1998), American entomologist
- William Francis Bell (1918–1984), American golf course architect
- William Hemphill Bell (1834–1906), US Army brigadier general

== Other uses ==
- William Bell, No. 24, 1865 pilot boat used by the Sandy Hook pilots in New Jersey

== See also ==
- Billy Bell (disambiguation)
- Bill Bell (disambiguation)
