= Billy Bell =

Billy or Bill Bell may refer to:

== Entertainment ==
- Billy Bell (SYTYCD), a dancer from So You Think You Can Dance
- Billy Bell (Them), former member of the band Them
- Bill Bell (music producer), music producer and former husband of Tara MacLean

== Sports ==
- Billy Bell (ice hockey) (1891–1952), Canadian ice hockey player
- Billy Bell (footballer) (1904–?), English footballer
- Billy Bell (Canadian football) (1923–2019), Canadian football player
- Billy Bell (defensive back) (born 1961), American football player
- Bill Bell (American football) (1947–2022), American gridiron football player
- Bill Bell (cricketer) (1931–2002), New Zealand cricketer
- Bill Bell (baseball) (1933–1962), American baseball player
- Bill Bell (basketball) (1927–2016), Canadian Olympic basketball player
- Bill Bell (pickleball) (1924–2006), one of the creators of the racket sport pickleball

== Other ==
- Billy Bell (politician) (1935–2020), British politician
- Bill Bell (West Virginia politician), American politician
- Bill Bell (businessman) (1932–2013), English football chairman
- Bill Bell (mayor) (born 1941), American politician
- Bill Bell (solicitor) (1912–2012), British lawyer and army officer

== See also ==
- William Bell (disambiguation)
