= Isabel Skelton =

Canadian historian

- Born: Isabel Murphy; July 9, 1877; Antrim, Ontario
- Died: August 22, 1956 (aged 79); Montreal, Quebec
- Occupation: Writer
- Spouse: Oscar Skelton (m. 1904; died 1941)
- Children: 3
- Writing career
- Period: 20th century
- Genres: History, biography

Isabel Skelton (July 9, 1877 – August 22, 1956) was a Canadian historian and educator. She was notable for being one of the first historians to study the role of women in Canadian history.

== Biography ==
Isabel Murphy was born in Antrim, Ontario, Carleton County, a rural area 30 km west of Ottawa. Her parents were Mary Jane Holliday, a teacher, and Alexander Murphy, a farmer. She attended Arnprior District High School and continued her studies at Queen's University in Kingston, Ontario. In 1901, she graduated with a master's degree in arts with a specialty in history.

In 1904, she married Oscar Skelton, whom she met while studying at university. Together they raised three children. In 1909, they moved to Kingston when Oscar was appointed Professor of Political Science and Economics at Queen's University. While in Kingston she became active in campus organizations. She was a member of the Queen's University Alumni Association. In 1915, she became president of the Women's Canadian Club of Kingston. She advocated for women's right to vote. She wrote an article for Canadian Magazine which stated that women voters might achieve greater rights in regards to property, marriage, and guardianship over children.

In 1915, she submitted a manuscript for the Chronicles of Canada that gave short biographies of notable Canadian women. Her book proposal was turned down, but she eventually retrieved the rights to the manuscript and published the book on her own. This was published as The Backwoodswoman: A Chronicle Of Pioneer Home Life in Canada by Ryerson Press in 1924.

In 1925, Oscar was appointed as undersecretary of state for external affairs in the government of William Lyon Mackenzie King and the family moved to Ottawa. She opposed the move as it distanced her from scholarly activities in Kingston. In 1941, Oscar died and she moved to Montreal to be closer to her son and his family. She continued to write and her last book, a biography of William Bell was published in 1947.

== Works ==
- The Backwoodswoman: A Chronicle Of Pioneer Home Life in Canada, (1924)
- The Life Of Thomas D'Arcy McGee, (1925)
- Isaac Jogues, (1928)
- A Man Austere: William Bell, Parson And Pioneer, (1947)

Citations for list of works:
