= Marshall Gilmore =

American bishop (born 1931)

Marshall Gilmore (born January 4, 1931) is an American bishop, the 41st bishop of the Christian Methodist Episcopal Church. His office and residence are in Dallas, Texas.

== Biography ==
Gilmore was born in Hoffman, North Carolina on January 4, 1931. From infancy, his early Christian nurture was within the bosom of the Pleasant Hill CME Church family. Gilmore graduated from the West Southern Pines High School in North Carolina in 1949, following which he entered military service, serving honorably in the U.S. Air Force from 1950 to 1954.

Upon his hearing and answering the call to preach, his home church granted license on January 2, 1954 – two days short of his 23rd birthday. The North Carolina Annual Conference admitted him on trial in 1955, and in the same year, Bishop William Yancy Bell ordained him deacon. The following year Bishop Bell ordained him elder.

He matriculated at Paine College in Augusta, Georgia, in 1954 and was graduated with a BA degree in 1957. He studied theology at Drew University, being awarded the M.Div. degree in 1960. He earned a Doctor of Ministry degree from the United Theological Seminary in 1974. Gilmore was awarded the Doctor of Divinity degree from Texas College and the Interdenominational Theological Center, and his alma mater, Paine College, bestowed upon him the degree of Doctor of Laws and Letters.

It was from distinguished and effective service in the pastoral ministry that Gilmore was elected to the episcopacy in 1982 – the senior in the largest episcopal class elected in the history of the church. That service carried him to pastoral appointments in Georgia, Illinois, Michigan, and Ohio. His last pastoral service was at the Phillips Temple CME Church of Dayton, Ohio, where he led the congregation in building a new edifice for which the mortgage was also liquidated.

As a bishop, Marshall Gilmore served as chair of the Department of Evangelism, and presently serves as chair of the Department of Personnel Services. He is also vice-chair of the General Connectional Board and is the representative of the CME Church on the Consultation on Church Union. He is also the chair of the board of trustees of Texas College, and a member of the board of trustees at Paine College.

He was married to the former Yvonne Dukes, a native of Fitzgerald, Georgia, and he is the father of two adult children.

At the 1994 General Conference, Gilmore was assigned the presiding bishop of the 8th Episcopal District.
