= Schal =

Schal is a surname. Notable people with the surname include:

- Coby Schal (born 1954), Polish-born American entomologist
- Edwin Schal (born 1943), Surinamese footballer

== See also ==
- Tünnes and Schäl, a pair of puppets at Hänneschen-Theater
