= Coby Schal =

Polish-born American entomologist (born 1954)

Coby Schal (born 1954) is a Polish-born American entomologist.

== Early life ==
Schal's parents were Polish. During the Holocaust, Henry Schal escaped from the Auschwitz concentration camp, and married Regina in 1950, who had been sent to Siberia. Their first child, Sarah, was born in 1951, followed by Coby Schal in 1954. In 1957, the Schal family moved to the Israeli city of Kiryat Motzkin, then subsequently relocated to Queens, New York, in 1968.

== Education and career ==
Coby Schal played soccer throughout high school and college. He entered SUNY Albany in 1972 as a pre-medical student, and graduated with a degree in biology in 1976. Schal then pursued a doctorate in entomology at the University of Kansas. During his first trip to Costa Rica for fieldwork purposes, Schal fell ill with histoplasmosis. After seeking medical treatment in New York, and a period of recovery in Kansas, Schal returned to Costa Rica. He completed doctoral studies in 1983 under the direction of William J. Bell and took on a postdoctoral research position with Ring T. Cardé at the University of Massachusetts Amherst. Schal began his teaching career at Rutgers University as an assistant professor in 1984, was promoted to an associate professorship in 1988, and in 1993, joined the North Carolina State University faculty as Blanton J. Whitmire Distinguished Professor of Structural Pest Management.

== Awards and honors ==
In 2006, Schal was elected a fellow of the Entomological Society of America, as well as the American Association for the Advancement of Science.

== Personal life ==
Schal met Patricia Ann Estes, a fellow University of Kansas student, in 1982, and the two later married.
