= Tal Afar uprising =

Iraqi Turkmen uprising against British

- Part of the Al-Jazira Front of the Turkish War of Independence and the Iraqi Revolt
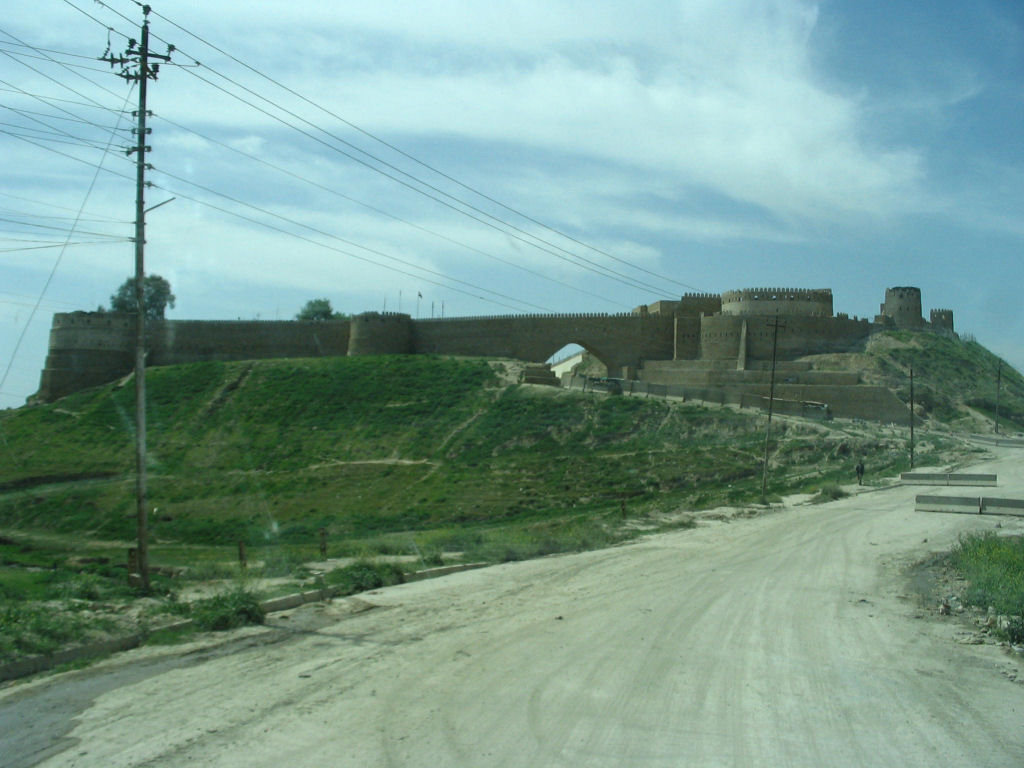
- Tal Afar Citadel, 2007
Date	3 June – 4 September 1920
Location	Tal Afar
Result	British victory

Belligerents
(Iraq Turkmen Front) Iraqi Turkmens	United Kingdom

Commanders and leaders
Lt. Cemil Muhammed Halil	Unknown

Strength
Unknown	Unknown

Casualties and losses
Unknown	Unknown

Tal Afar uprising or Kaçakaç Rebellion was a rebellion during the Anglo-Turkish War of 1918–1923, which resulted in a British victory.

== Background ==
With the capture of Sheikh Mahmud and his exile to Kuwait, the first period of the Kuva-yi Milliye movement in Sulaymaniyah in 1919 ended. After this, resistance efforts shifted to Mosul. Various organizations, especially the "Cemiyet-i Hilaliye" established here, gained effectiveness with the participation of the Arabs

== Uprising ==
Telafer was captured by the Turkmens with the rebellion led by Lieutenant Colonel Cemil Muhammed Halil Efendi. With the delay in the reinforcements coming from Anatolia, the forward operation to save Mosul remained inconclusive. Learning about the situation, the British entered Tal Afar with the support of the air force and eventually suppressed the uprising.

== Aftermath ==
After what happened in Tal Afar, the resistance continued in Rawanduz. The guidance of Erbil, the leader of the Kurdish forces in the region, and the Zebars living with the Surci tribe was observed. In addition, Türkiye participated in this uprising with the support of three officers and one hundred soldiers. This military support was managed by Major Şevki Bey since 9 August 1921. It is known that this support played an important role in keeping the region under public sovereignty again. After the Rawanduz Uprising, the British advanced to the region on December 16, 1921, in a failed attempt to recapture the area.

== Sources ==
- Güztoklusu, Murat (2006). Elcezire ve Özdemir Harekatı. Ümit yayıncılık. ISBN 978-975-8572-92-2.
- Durmaz, Batın (2022). "KURTULUŞ SAVAŞI'NIN EL CEZİRE CEPHESİ".
- Türkmen, Zekeriya (2021). "Şefik Özdemir Bey'in Revandiz Harekatı". ataturkansiklopedisi.gov.tr. Atatürk Ansiklopedisi.
