= Robert Dick (salt-grieve) =

Religious life
- Religion: Christianity
- School: Presbyterianism
- Profession: merchant, salt-grieve

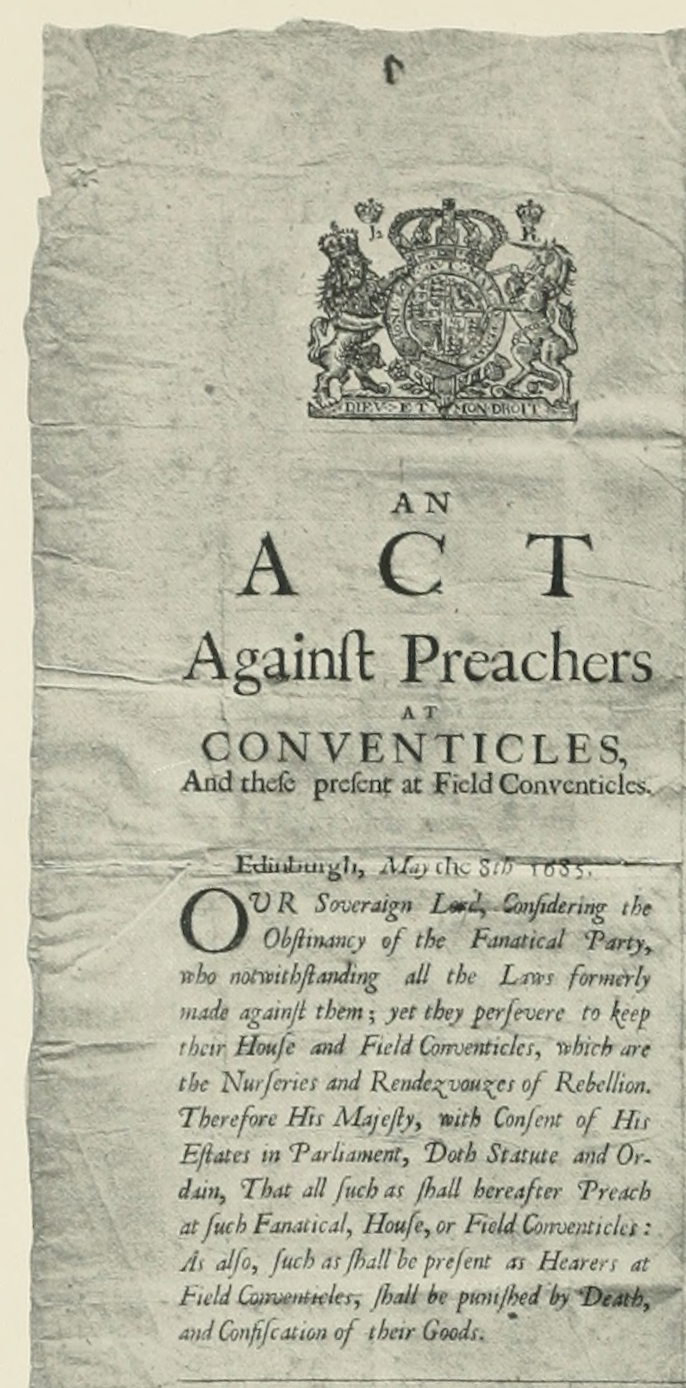
The Scottish Parliament on 8 May 1685, have recorded the following : Our sovereign Lord, considering the obstinacy of the fanatical party who, notwithstanding all the laws formerly made against them, still keep their house and field conventicles, which are the nurseries and rendezvouses of rebellion; therefore His Majesty, with consent of Parliament, ordains that all such persons who shall hereafter preach at such house or field conventicles, also those who shall be present as hearers, shall be punished by death and confiscation of their goods.

Robert Dick of Prestonpans was a 17th-century merchant and inspector of salt works to Lord Carringtoune. He was arrested on 4 September 1676 for attending an open-air service in the Pentland Hills.

== Charges ==
While they were carried up the West Bow at Edinburgh, along with William Bell, an unsuccessful attempt was made at a rescue, and all were imprisoned. He refused to give his oath at his trial on 12 October and was sent to the Bass Rock on the Firth of Forth in Haddingtonshire along with William Bell. In October, 1676, he was charged, before the Privy Council, for "convocating disorderly and seditious meetings" at Pentland Hills and divers other places. William Bell was charged with preaching and Dick's crime was that he did "convocat the people therto".(Brown pg. 44) The list of conventicles and charges included: "the Pentland Hills, Caldermuir, Drumshoirling Muir, Kirklistoune (Kirkliston), Borthwick, Edmonstoune Chaple, Woolmett, Corstorphin, Torwood, Gledsmuir, Dumbarr, Whythill, Eistbarnes, Broxburne, Newtounlees, and several other places, or at one or other of them or near thereto, and not only heard outed ministers preach but took upon them to convocate people from Edinburgh and elsewhere to the said meetings." Dick admitted having been present at the Pentland conventicle but refused to depone, upon oath, any connexion with the others. This the Council regarded as equivalent to a plea of "Guilty," and he was, accordingly, relegated to the dungeons of the Bass. After two years of rigorous imprisonment he was again brought before the Council, in September 1678, on the "foresaid libel." Dick, however, still refused to incriminate himself; and, for his contumacy he was banished to the plantations of the West, where probably he ended his days in slavery.

== Family ==
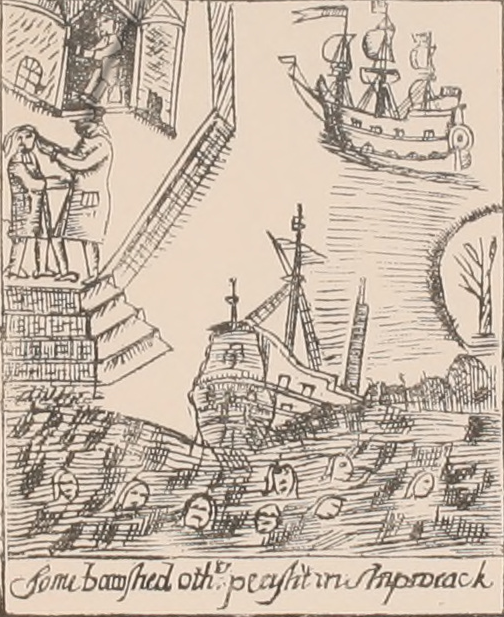
Some prisoners were sold to gifted into servitude or slavery in the newly established colonies in America or the West Indies. Others didn't make it that far for example those who drowned at Deerness.

Nothing much is known about his family although some research was done on the subject.

Another Covenanter called Robert Dick appears to have been killed at Airsmoss and has an unusual tombstone there.
