= Robert Bell (Lanark County politician) =

Province of Canada politician

Robert Bell (March 16, 1808 – April 2, 1894) was a businessman and political figure in Canada West.

He was born in London, England in 1808, the son of William Bell, and came to Perth, Upper Canada with his family in 1817. He worked as a printer at the Brockville Recorder under William Buell. In 1829, he opened a general store at Carleton Place as a partnership with his brother William's Perth business. He was postmaster at Carleton Place from 1834 to 1856. He was also later appointed justice of the peace.

In 1842, Bell represented Beckwith Township on the first council for Bathurst District and he was district warden from 1847 to 1848. In 1850, he served as reeve for Beckwith Township and warden for the United Counties of Lanark and Renfrew. He represented Lanark County in the Legislative Assembly from 1848 to 1851 and Lanark North from 1854 to 1864, when he was appointed inspector of canal revenues in the Department of Finance.

He operated a number of businesses at Carleton Place including several mills and was a director of the Brockville and Ottawa Railway and the Canada Central Railway. He also served as lieutenant-colonel in the local militia.

He died at Carleton Place in 1894 and was buried at Perth.
