= Oscar D. Skelton =

Canadian political economist and civil servant

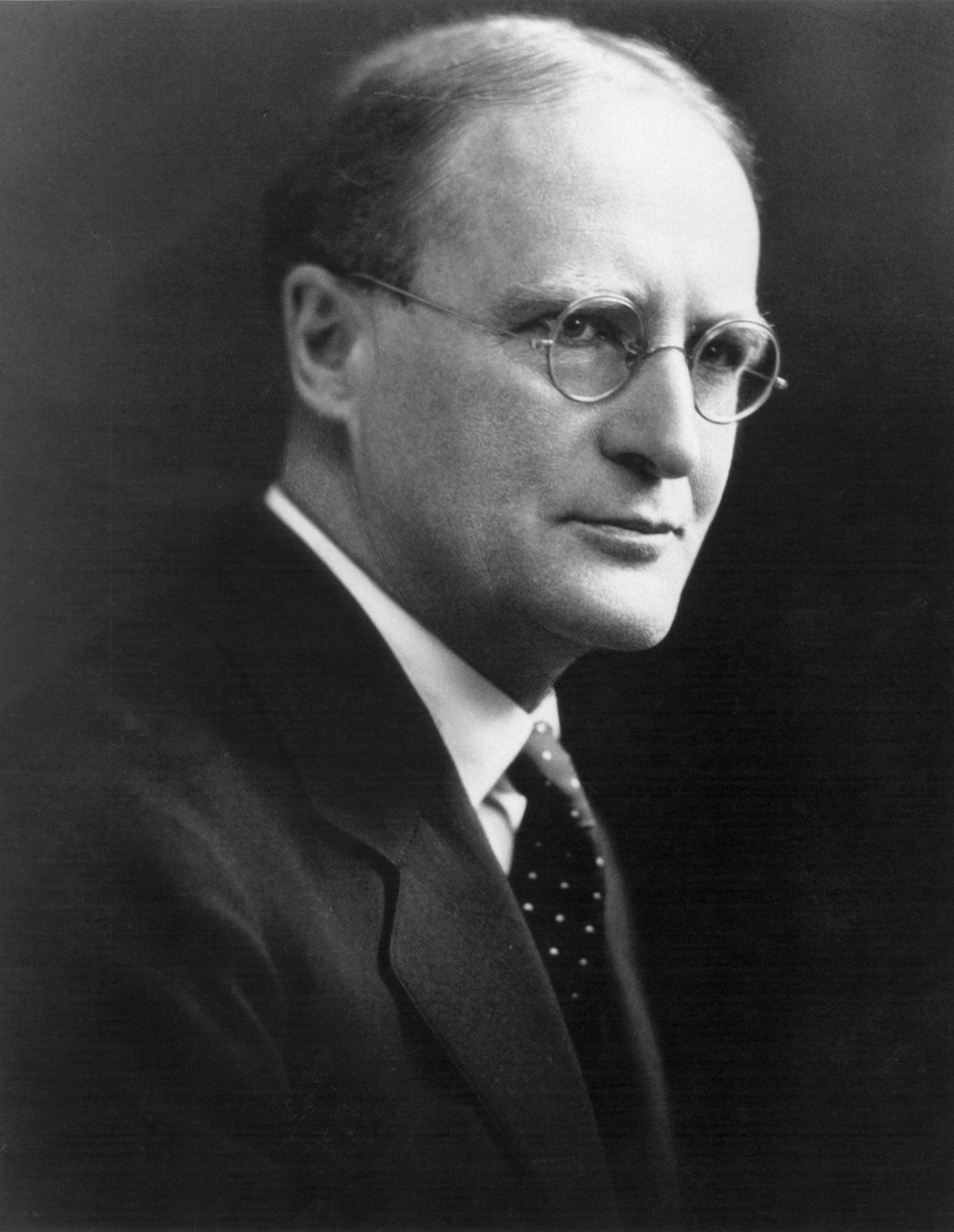
- Skelton, c. 1925–35
- Born: Oscar Douglas Skelton; July 13, 1878; Orangeville, Ontario
- Died: January 28, 1941 (aged 62); Ottawa, Ontario
- Education: Queen's University; University of Chicago
- Occupations: Political economist, civil servant
- Spouse: Isabel Murphy (m. 1904)

Oscar Douglas Skelton (July 13, 1878 – January 28, 1941) was a Canadian political economist and civil servant. Skelton was a loyal member of the Liberal Party, an expert on international affairs, and a nationalist who encouraged Canadians to pursue autonomy from the British Empire, and to take on what he proclaimed was "the work of the world."

== Early life and career ==
Born on July 13, 1878, in Orangeville, Ontario, Skelton went on to gain a scholarship to Queen's University in 1896 and studied classics. His education in classical languages helped him to pass the examinations for entry into Britain’s Indian Civil Service (ICS), but he failed the medical test. In 1899 he earned a Master of Arts degree and audited classes of Adam Shortt, a political scientist. He worked in Philadelphia for The Booklover's Magazine and in 1904 married Isabel Murphy. He then took up the study of political economy at University of Chicago and followed the lectures of Thorstein Veblen, whom he admired for his "stock of science and of philosophy & of first hand knowledge of business affairs."

Skelton kept in touch with Shortt at his alma mater and was offered work there in 1907. Skelton earned his doctorate in political economy from the University of Chicago in 1908. He was appointed to the John A. Macdonald Professorship of Political Science and Economics at Queen's University in 1909, which he held until 1925. He also served as the university's Dean of Arts and as chair of their board of trustees.

He was the author of two books in the Chronicles of Canada series: The Day of Sir Wilfrid Laurier: A Chronicle of Our Own Times (1916) and The Railway Builders: A Chronicle of Overland Highways (1920).

== Civil service career ==
Skelton later became Under-Secretary of State for External Affairs, replacing an aging Sir Joseph Pope in 1925. He became one of Mackenzie King's most trusted advisors during the inter-war era. He served as the principal adviser to the Prime Minister and was sometimes called the "deputy prime minister". King's choice of Skelton to succeed Pope was influenced in part by an address which Skelton gave to the Canadian Club in Ottawa in 1922, praising King's decision for neutrality during the Chanak crisis and stated that Canada should not issue "blank cheques" to Britain as in 1914 when Canada considered itself automatically at war with Germany because Britain had declared war. He served for more than 15 years in this capacity. Skelton was described by one historian as the most powerful civil servant in Canada of his time.

Skelton served as a member of the 2nd Council of the Northwest Territories until his death on January 28, 1941, in Ottawa. His death, coming in the midst of wartime, hit King very hard; the two, who shared similar educational backgrounds, had been close. Historian John English, in his biography of Lester B. Pearson, wrote that Skelton played the major role in the building of Canada's external affairs department.

== Works ==
- Socialism: A Critical Analysis, (1911)
- Economic History Of Canada Since Confederation, (1913)
- The Day Of Sir Wilfrid Laurier: A Chronicle Of Our Own Times, (1916)
- The Railway/Railroad Builders: A Chronicle Of Overland Highways, (1916)
- The Life And Times Of Sir Alexander Tilloch Galt, (1920)
- The Canadian Dominion: A Chronicle Of Our Northern Neighbor, (1920)
- Life And Letters Of Sir Wilfrid Laurier, (1921)
- Our Generation, Its Gains And Losses, (1938)
