= Chanak crisis =

1922 Anglo-Turkish war scare

- Part of the Anglo-Turkish War (1918–1923)
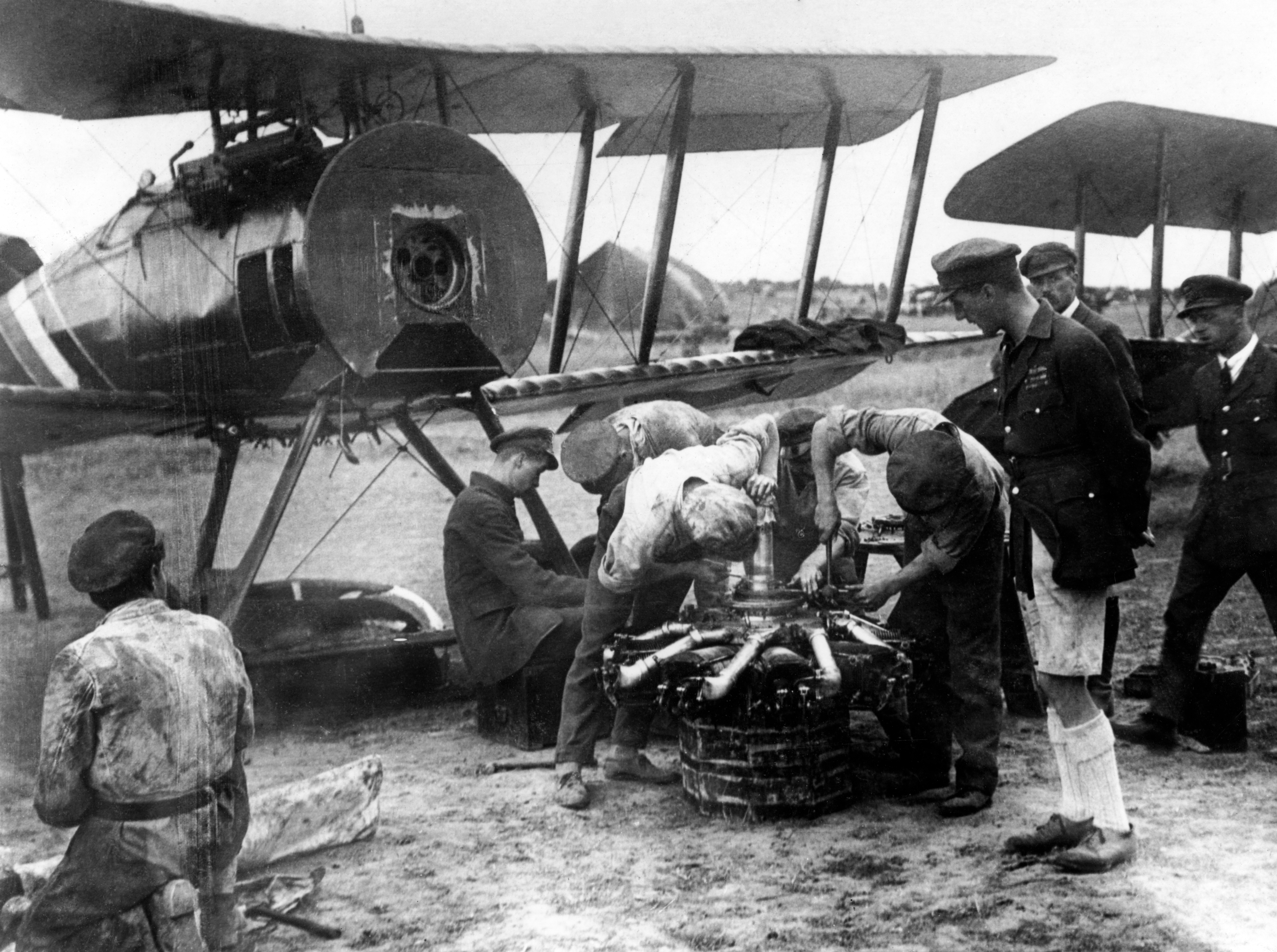
- British pilots of 203 Squadron look on as ground personnel service the engine of one of the squadron's Nieuport Nightjar fighters whilst detached to Gallipoli, Turkey, in 1922
Date	15 September – 11 October 1922
Location	Çanakkale, Turkey

Belligerents
Ankara Government	(United Kingdom of Great Britain and Ireland) United Kingdom; (French Third Republic) France; (Kingdom of Italy) Italy; Greece

Commanders and leaders
Mustafa Kemal Pasha; İsmet Pasha; Fevzi Pasha; Fahrettin Pasha	(United Kingdom of Great Britain and Ireland) David Lloyd George; (United Kingdom of Great Britain and Ireland) Winston Churchill; (French Third Republic) Raymond Poincaré

Units involved
V Cavalry Corps	Occupation forces

Strength
28,000	All Allied forces in Istanbul and Çanakkale: (United Kingdom of Great Britain and Ireland) 27,419; (French Third Republic) 19,069; (Kingdom of Italy) 3,992; (Greece) 795; Total: c. 51,300 soldiers (411 machine guns, 57 artillery pieces) (French and Italian forces withdrew as soon as the ultimatum was delivered.)

Casualties and losses
None	None

The Chanak crisis (Turkish: Çanakkale Krizi), also called the Chanak affair and the Chanak incident, was a war scare in September 1922 between the United Kingdom and the Government of the Grand National Assembly in Turkey. Chanak refers to Çanakkale, a city on the Anatolian side of the Dardanelles Strait. The crisis was caused by Turkish efforts to push the Greek armies out of Turkey and restore Turkish rule in the Allied-occupied territories, primarily in Constantinople (now Istanbul) and Eastern Thrace. Turkish troops marched against British and French positions in the Dardanelles neutral zone. For a time, war between Britain and Turkey seemed possible, but Canada refused to agree as did France and Italy. British public opinion did not want a war. The British military did not either, and the top general on the scene, Sir Charles Harington, refused to relay an ultimatum to the Turks because he counted on a negotiated settlement. The Conservatives in Britain's coalition government refused to follow Liberal Prime Minister David Lloyd George, who with Winston Churchill was calling for war.

The crisis quickly ended when Turkey, having overwhelmed the Greeks, agreed to a negotiated settlement that gave it the territory it wanted. Lloyd George's mishandling of the crisis contributed to his downfall via the Carlton Club meeting. The crisis raised the issue of who decided on war for the British Empire, and was Canada's first assertion of diplomatic independence from London. Historian Robert Blake says the Chanak crisis led to Arthur Balfour's definition of Britain and the dominions as "autonomous Communities within the British Empire, equal in status, in no way subordinate one to another in any aspect of the domestic or internal affairs, though united by a common allegiance to the Crown, and freely associated as members of the British Commonwealth of Nations". In 1931 the UK Parliament enacted Balfour's formula into law through the Statute of Westminster 1931.

Locations of the Turkish Straits: the Bosphorus (red), linking the Sea of Marmara with the Black Sea, and the Dardanelles (yellow), linking the Sea of Marmara with the Aegean Sea

== The events ==
The Turkish troops had recently defeated Greek forces and recaptured İzmir (Smyrna) on 9 September and were advancing on Constantinople in the neutral zone established by the Armistice of Mudros and Treaty of Sèvres. On September 10, the War Office began to express concerns over the viability of the Greek Army and urged a British withdrawal to Gallipoli, but Harington rejected the advice because he believed such an attack was not likely and that the small force could be an effective deterrent. In an interview published in Daily Mail, 15 September 1922, leader of the Turkish national movement Mustafa Kemal (later Atatürk) stated that "Our demands remain the same after our recent victory as they were before. We ask for Asia Minor, Thrace up to the River Maritsa and Constantinople ... We must have our capital and I should in that case be obliged to march on Constantinople with my army, which will be an affair of only a few days. I much prefer to obtain possession by negotiation, though naturally I cannot wait indefinitely." The British Cabinet met on the same day and decided that British forces should maintain their positions. On the following day, in the absence of Foreign Secretary Lord Curzon, certain Cabinet ministers issued a communiqué threatening Turkey with a declaration of war by Britain and the Dominions, on the grounds that Turkey had violated the Treaty of Sèvres. On 18 September, on his return to London, Curzon pointed out that this would enrage the Prime Minister of France, Raymond Poincaré, and left for Paris to attempt to smooth things over. Poincaré, however, had already ordered the withdrawal of the French detachment at Chanak but persuaded the Turks to respect the neutral zone. Curzon reached Paris on 20 September and, after several angry meetings with Poincaré, reached agreement to negotiate an armistice with the Turks.

Meanwhile, the Turkish population living in Constantinople were being organised for a possible offensive against the city by the Kemalist forces. For instance, Ernest Hemingway, reporting for The Toronto Daily Star at the time as a war correspondent, wrote about a specific incident:

Another night a destroyer ... stopped a boatload of Turkish women who were crossing from Asia Minor ... On being searched for arms it turned out all the women were men. They were all armed and later proved to be Kemalist officers sent over to organize the Turkish population in the suburbs in case of an attack on Constantinople.

In British politics, Lloyd George, Winston Churchill, and the Conservatives Lord Birkenhead and Austen Chamberlain were pro-Greek and wanted war; all other Conservatives of the coalition in his government were pro-Turk and rejected war. Lloyd George's position as head of the coalition became untenable. The Lloyd George cabinet was influenced by false intelligence, including the possibility that Turkey would conclude a military agreement with Soviet Russia. Although MI6 reported that Turkey and Soviet Russia were already drifting apart, the Cabinet continued to express concern about a Soviet Navy intervention. Churchill published a pro-war manifesto warning of a massive Turkish offensive into Europe undoing the result of the war, which was widely lambasted and embarrassed the British government. Lloyd George was warned by the Foreign Office, the Imperial General Staff, and even former Supreme Allied Commander Ferdinand Foch against supporting the Greeks but ignored them. Furthermore, the British public were alarmed by the Chanak episode and the possibility of going to war again. It further undercut Lloyd George that he had not fully consulted the Dominion prime ministers.

Unlike 1914, when World War I broke out, Canada in particular did not automatically consider itself active in the conflict. Instead, Prime Minister William Lyon Mackenzie King insisted that the Parliament of Canada should decide on the course of action the country would follow. King was offended by the telegram he received from Churchill asking for Canada to send troops to Chanak to support Britain, and sent back a telegram, which was couched in Canadian nationalist language, declaring that Canada would not automatically support Britain if it came to war with Turkey. Given that the majority of the MPs of King's Liberal Party were opposed to going to war with Turkey together with the Progressive MPs who were supporting King's minority government, it is likely that Canada would have declared neutrality if the crisis came to war. The Chanak issue badly divided Canadian public opinion with French Canadians and Canadian nationalists in English Canada like professor Oscar D. Skelton saying Canada should not issue "blank cheques" to Britain like that issued in 1914 and supporting King's implicit decision for neutrality. By contrast, the Conservative leader Arthur Meighen in a speech in Toronto criticized King and declared: "When Britain's message came, then Canada should have said, 'Ready, aye ready, we stand by you.'" By the time the issue had been debated in the House of Commons of Canada, the threat at Chanak had passed. Nonetheless, King made his point: the Canadian Parliament would decide the role that Canada would play in external affairs and could diverge from the British government. The other dominion prime ministers—with the two exceptions of Newfoundland and New Zealand, which each offered a battalion— and allies Yugoslavia, Italy and Romania gave no support.

The present crisis has accidentally revealed the truth. Mr Lloyd George is the first Prime Minister of this country whom even Fleet Street, let alone the nation, will not follow into war. This is the decisive comment upon his career. It should be his epitaph.

— The New Statesman, 23 September 1922.

On 23 September, the British cabinet decided to give East Thrace to the Turks, thus forcing Greeks to abandon it without a fight. This convinced Kemal to accept the opening of armistice talks and on 28 September he told the British that he had ordered his troops to avoid any incident at Chanak, nominating Mudanya as the venue for peace negotiations. The parties met there on 3 October and agreed to the terms of the Armistice of Mudanya on 11 October, two hours before British forces were due to attack.

== Consequences ==
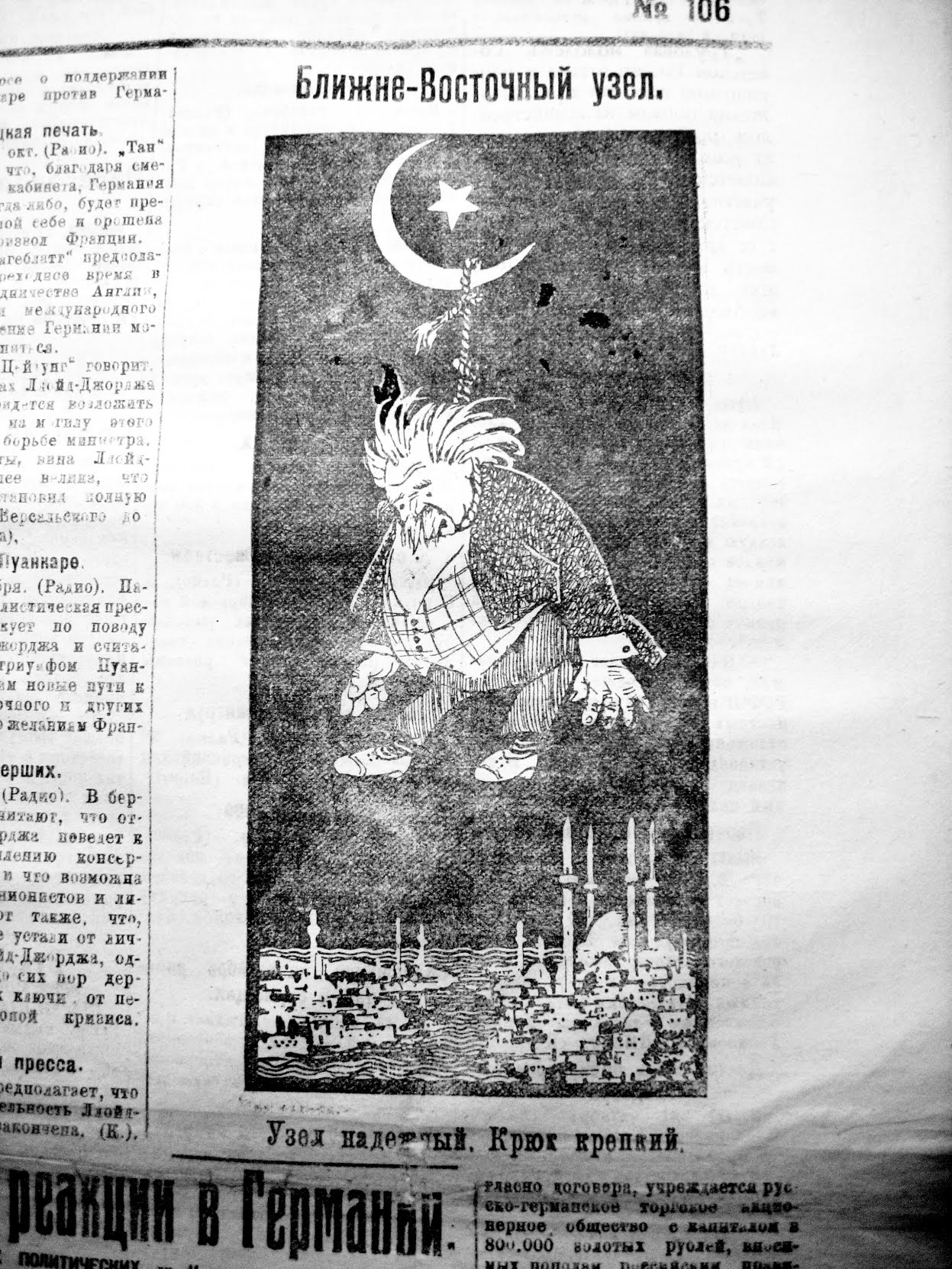
A cartoon drawn after David Lloyd George's resignation

Lloyd George's rashness resulted in the calling of a meeting of Conservative MPs at the Carlton Club on 19 October 1922, which passed a motion that the Conservative Party should fight the next general election as an independent party. This decision had dire ramifications for Lloyd George, as the Conservative Party made up the vast majority of the 1918–1922 post-war coalition. Indeed, they held an outright majority in the Commons and could have formed a government alone if they so wished.

Lloyd George also lost the support of the influential Lord Curzon, who considered that the Prime Minister had been manoeuvring behind his back. Following the Carlton Club decision Lloyd George resigned as prime minister, never to hold office again. Although many expected a new coalition to be formed under a Conservative prime minister, the Conservatives, under returned party leader Bonar Law, subsequently won the 1922 general election with an overall majority.

British and French forces were ultimately withdrawn from the neutral zone in summer 1923, following the ratification of the Treaty of Lausanne.

The Chanak crisis fundamentally challenged the assumption that the Dominions would automatically follow Britain into war. The British journalist Mark Arnold-Forster wrote: "1922 was a year in which accepted doctrines fell like ninpins...It had been assumed till then that although parts of the British Empire—Australia, New Zealand, Canada and South Africa—had been granted self government, the whole Empire would automatically support the mother country in any war which the British government in London thought advisable or necessary...But the Chanak incident marked the beginning of a family quarrel within the British [Empire], which weakened it. The mother country's children were no longer prepared to go to war simply because mother said so". The crisis changed the relations between the Dominions and London, paving the way for the Statute of Westminster 1931, which gave statutory recognition to the autonomy of the six Dominions.
