= United Kingdom during the Turkish War of Independence =

Undeclared war between the United Kingdom and Turkish Nationalists, 1918–1923

- Part of the Turkish War of Independence
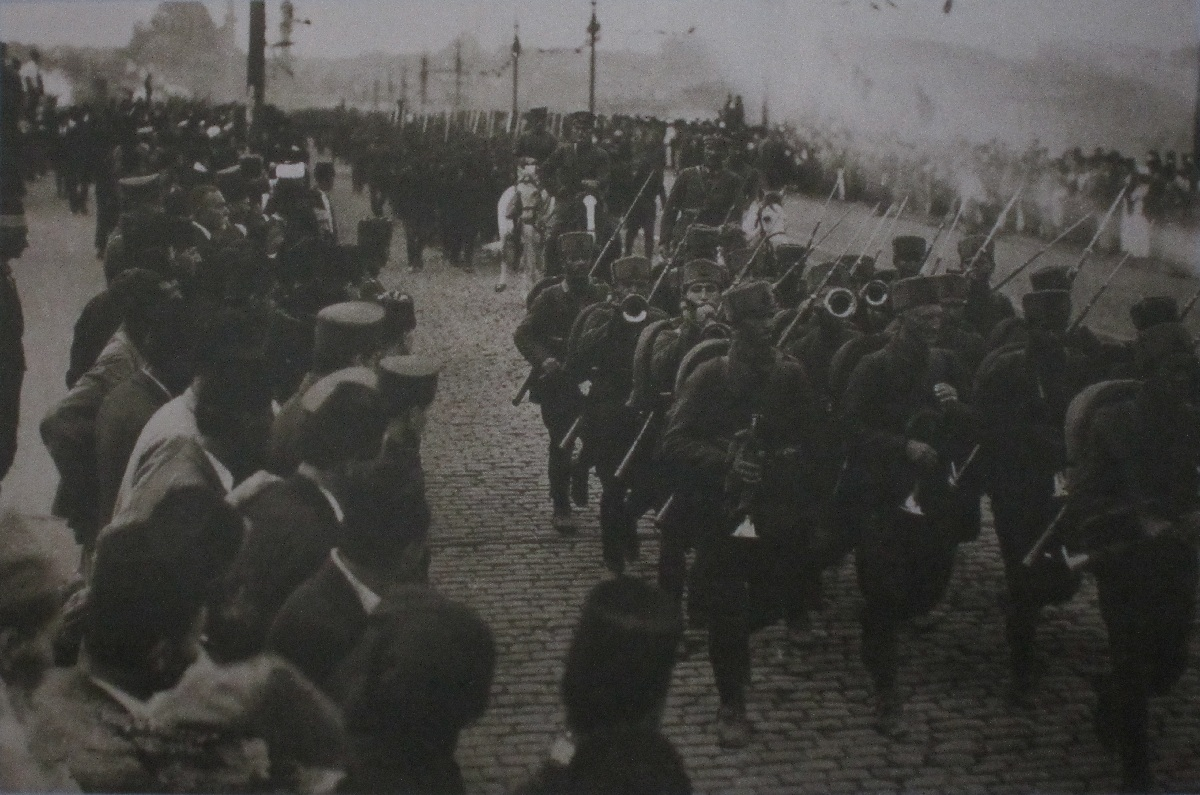
- Turkish forces enter Constantinople under the command of Şükrü Naili Pasha
Date	13 November 1918 – 24 July 1923
Location	Constantinople, Mosul, Turkish straits, Black Sea, and other places in Anatolia
Territorial changes	Turkish Nationalists took Constantinople (Istanbul) and the Dardanelles

Belligerents
Turkish National Movement Supported by: Iraqi Turkmens; (Russian Socialist Federative Soviet Republic) Soviet Russia (from 1921); (Kingdom of Italy) Italy (from May 1919); (French Third Republic) France (from October 1921); Kingdom of Kurdistan (only in Mosul with Turks)	British Empire: (United Kingdom of Great Britain and Ireland) United Kingdom; British Raj; "Watani" Arab volunteers; (Assyrian homeland) Iraq Levies; Australia; (Dominion of New Zealand) New Zealand; States simultaneously at war with the Turks: (Kingdom of Greece) Greece (until September 1922); (French Third Republic) France (until October 1921) List; (French protectorate in Morocco) French Morocco; (French protectorate of Tunisia) French Tunisia; (French Third Republic) French West Africa; (French Third Republic) French Algeria; (First Republic of Armenia) French Armenian Legion; (First Republic of Armenia) Armenia (until December 1920); Ottoman Empire; (Democratic Republic of Georgia) Georgia (in 1921); Supported by: United States (Note: For further information, see United States during the Turkish War of Independence.); Southern Russia Armed Forces; Rebellions supported by the British: (Ottoman Empire) Revolt of Ahmet Anzavur; (Ottoman Empire) Kuva-yi Inzibatiye; (Kurdistan Region) Koçgiri rebellion; (Ottoman Empire) Çapanoğlu uprising; (Kurdistan Region) Milli uprising; Pontic rebellion; Revenge Regiment uprising; (Ottoman Empire) Konya rebellion; (Ottoman Empire) Çopur Musa rebellion

Commanders and leaders
Mustafa Kemal Pasha; Ali Fuat Pasha; Şefik Özdemir Bey; Sheikh Mahmud Barzanji; Mahmut Bey	(United Kingdom) David Lloyd George (United Kingdom) Charles Harrington (United Kingdom) George Milne; Faisal ibn Hussein (United Kingdom) Major Noel

Strength
28,000 soldiers in Constantinople Al-Jazira Front: (Note: Irregular forces are not included.) Remmants of the 13th army corps (initially) 6,700 (creation of the regular army, December 1920) ~10,000 (1922)	27,419 in Constantinople: 50 artillery; 36 planes; 16 warships; 2 brigade came after the Chanak Crisis; Total in Constantinople: ~38,000 30,000–40,000 in Anatolia Al-Jazira Front: 20,000–30,000 (initially)

During the Turkish War of Independence, the United Kingdom sought to undermine and contain the Turkish National Movement. London hoped the defeated Ottoman Empire would play a subservient role in its new Middle Eastern order drawn up over several diplomatic agreements during World War I, culminating with the Treaty of Sèvres. Another goal of the British was to prosecute Ottoman war criminals, whom they believed Constantinople/Istanbul was not taking seriously.

In addition to diplomatic initiatives against the Istanbul and Ankara governments, British Empire forces directly fought the Nationalist Forces on the Al Jazira front and in scattered actions among Anatolian occupation garrisons. They also provided support for Greece in the Greco-Turkish War and to the Istanbul government. At the end of the conflict, the United Kingdom almost declared war against the Ankara government during the Chanak Crisis. Its conclusion led to the Allies abandoning Constantinople to Ankara forces and the fall of the David Lloyd George cabinet.

== De-facto occupation of Constantinople ==
The de facto occupation of Constantinople commenced on 13 November 1918. On 7 November, under the pretext of clearing mines, the Allies' navy passed through the Dardanelles and reached the city. The Allies' navy, consisting of 61 warships, anchored in front of the capital. With the addition of 11 warships and a Greek battleship, the number of ships anchored in front of Constantinople totaled 73. 3,626 soldiers, the majority British from the Allied Fleet, landed. They were stationed in various official and unofficial buildings in Constantinople. Beyoğlu/Pera and the Rumelian coast were left under the control of the British, the Fatih district under the control of the French, and the Anatolian coast under the control of the Italians. Occupation Commander Maitland Wilson established a headquarters at the British Girls' High School in Beyoğlu. The number of ships anchored in front of Constantinople increased to 167 by 15 November.

== Politics in Constantinople ==
=== The National Pact and the start of the occupation ===
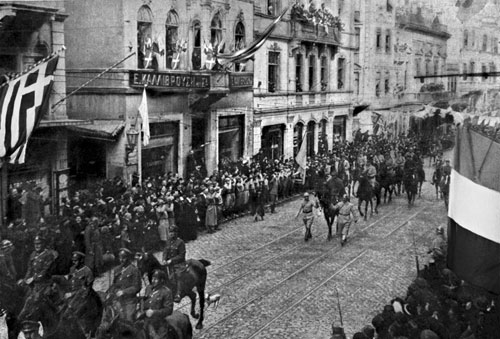
Allied occupation forces on İstiklal Avenue, Constantinople

Ali Rıza Pasha was appointed Grand Vizier on 3 October 1919, following the resignation of Damat Ferit Pasha. The nationalist tendencies of some members of this cabinet were known to the Allied representatives in Constantinople. Chief among these members was the Minister of War, Mersinli Cemal Pasha. Cemal Pasha was quick to enter into a conflict over the Allies' military control in Anatolia, in accordance with the Armistice of Mudros.

As soon as Rıza's cabinet was established, he announced elections to be held for the Chamber of Deputies. Following the elections, the Chamber of Deputies held its first meeting on 12 January 1920, which was dominated by nationalist deputies loyal to Mustafa Kemal Pasha (Atatürk). Parliament secretly passed the National Pact (Misak-ı Millî) on January 28, which became a political manifesto for the Turkish Nationalists. The Turkish Nationalists challenged the Allies at a time when the Allies were preparing peace terms and the Turks themselves were determining the peace terms they would accept. Moreover, Sultan Mehmed VI was far from being in control of all these events.

The original text of the Misak-ı Millî

The National Pact was declared to the public on 17 February 1920, which angered the Allies. They pressed the Ottoman government for the declaration to be reversed. Failure to revoke the decision resulted in the British raiding the Şehzadebaşı barracks. The British high commissioner announced that they would fully occupy Constantinople at 10 A.M. According to W. S. Edmons, the only way to punish the Turks was "invading Constantinople fully".

=== Under full occupation ===
Until September 1922, no serious events occurred in Constantinople. But in Constantinople, some Turkish secret services were founded, such as "M. M. Grubu" (M. M. Organization). The British also learned of the Karakol group.

Before the Battle of the Sakarya, the position of the Turkish army was not good. All the supplies that the Ankara army needed were stored in depots in Constantinople, which were now guarded by Allied soldiers. The secret organizations that were founded by Turkish nationalists raided those depots and brought those materials to the Ankara government.

=== The Chanak Crisis ===
After the Great Offensive, the Turkish army advanced on the Dardanelles. The British Councils of Ministers met on 15 September 1922 and said that British soldiers must defend their positions. The next day, in the absence of Foreign Secretary Lord Curzon, some cabinet ministers threatened Turkey with a declaration of war by Britain and its dominions on the grounds that Turkey had violated the Treaty of Sèvres. Curzon, who returned to his country after discussing this issue in France on 18 September, was recalled by French Prime Minister Raymond Poincaré. Poincaré informed Curzon, who returned to France on 20 September, that the French troops in Chanak had started to withdraw immediately and harshly rebuked him for the ceasefire.

The British people did not want to go to war with the Turks again in the Dardanelles. The Dominions announced that they would not send any forces after Prime Minister David Lloyd George did not consult on the issue. Canadian Prime Minister William Lyon Mackenzie King announced that the situation was different from World War I, which broke out 8 years ago, and that the Canadian Parliament must decide whether to send troops.

The UK Council of Ministers, meeting on 23 September, decided to leave Constantinople and Eastern Thrace to Turkey. Thereupon, the commander-in-chief of the Turkish armies, Mustafa Kemal Pasha, ordered the army to stop. He offered to negotiate in Mudanya for a ceasefire. The parties met in Mudanya on October 3. On October 11, the terms of the ceasefire were accepted by the United Kingdom with a 2-hour delay after the British received reinforcements. The Ankara Government was convinced that this reinforcement would not cause any resistance.

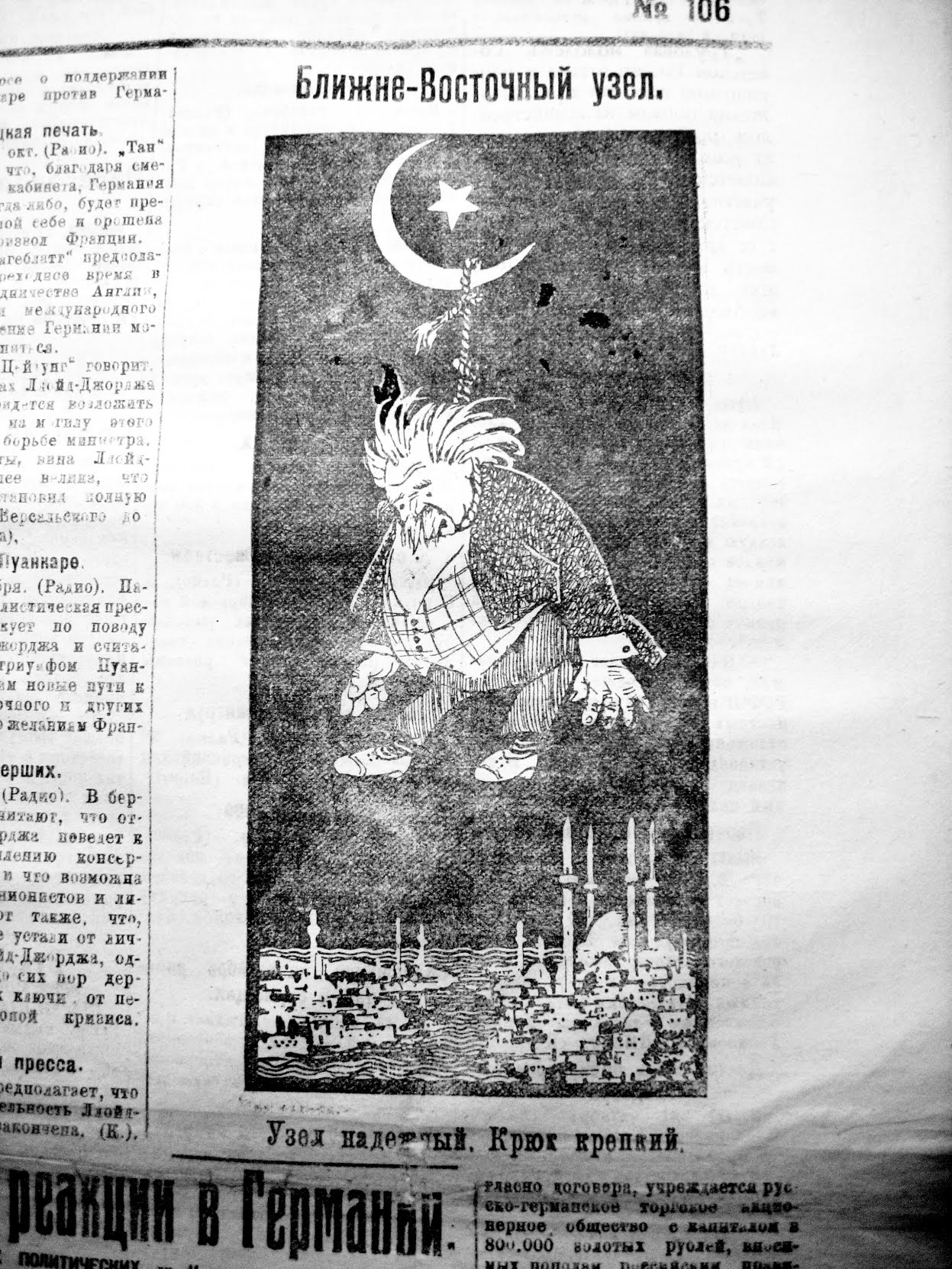
A cartoon drawn after David Lloyd George's resignation

The Conservative Party left the government with the Carlton Club meeting on 19 October 1922 and declared that it would enter the next elections separately from the Liberal Party. Thus, Lloyd George was left without significant support. Additionally, Lord Curzon announced that he was withdrawing his support from Lloyd George. Lloyd George subsequently resigned as prime minister, never to return as a key figure in British politics.

== Al Jazira front ==
While the Turkish War of Independence was continuing in Anatolia, Mustafa Kemal expressed interest in the Al Jazira front (Turkish: El Cezire Cephesi), also known as the Mosul front. An example of this is the appointment of Cevat (Çobanlı) Pasha to the Al Jazira Front. Cevat Pasha, who served on the Mesopotamian Front in World War I, was appointed to the position because he knew the region well. Cevat immediately went to Diyarbakır to set up a headquarters. Özdemir Bey and many Turkish officers were sent to Revandiz (Rawandiz) by Mustafa Kemal to manage the ongoing resistance in the region.

Sulaymaniyah erupted in revolt on 26 May 1919, four days before the Battle of Ayvalık, it is there that the Turkish resistance began and ended. The Al Jazira front was the longest-lasting front of the Turkish War of Independence.

=== Mahmud Barzanji's revolt of May–June 1919 ===
On 23 May 1919, Mahmud Barzanji, a Kurdish sheikh, revolted against British forces with 300 men. During the first stages of the rebellion, Barzanji had some success. Sheikh Mahmud was previously appointed by Halil Kut Pasha to manage Suleymaniye, an Ottoman sanjak.

Mustafa Kemal and Barzanji were in correspondence during this time. This resistance, which started in Sulaymaniyah, took Kemal Pasha's attention. After the Erzurum Congress, Kemal congratulated Sheikh Mahmud, who was carrying out military activities in the region, but the message could not reach him. Mahmud and his men were ambushed and captured by the British in the Bazyan Pass between Sulaymaniyah and Kirkuk.

The British, who were worried that Mosul would be completely occupied by the Turks after the Battle of Derbent, brought Sheikh Mahmut back to Sulaymaniyah and officially established the Kingdom of Kurdistan as a British mandate on 10 October 1922. The British wished to prevent Mosul and its surroundings from being connected to Turkey and wished to maintain their economic interests in the region. However, the Sheikh again revolted; in 1924 the kingdom was forcibly dissolved, and the region became part of Mandatory Iraq.

=== Tal Afar Uprising (1920) ===
With the capture of Sheikh Mahmud and his exile to Kuwait, the first period of the Kuva-yi Milliye movement in Sulaymaniyah in 1919 ended. After this, resistance efforts shifted to Mosul. Various organizations, including the Cemiyet-i Hilaliye, were established, which gained the support of Arabs that were opposed to British occupation. Many uprisings took place in 1920; one such uprising was the Tal Afar uprising, which took place in late June. Due to the leadership's ties with the Ankara government, this rebellion and the following ones were known as the "Hareketü'l-Kemaliye" (Movement of Kemal).

Tel Afar was captured by a group of Iraqi Turkmen rebels led by Lieutenant Colonel Cemil Muhammed Halil Efendi. With the delay in the reinforcements coming from Anatolia, a forward operation to retake Mosul remained inconclusive. Learning about the situation, British troops entered Tal Afar with the support of the RAF Iraq Command and recaptured the town, putting an end to the rebellion.

=== Revandiz Rebellion ===
After the uprising in Tal Afar, the resistance continued in Revandiz. On 1 May 1920, Mustafa Kemal Pasha drew attention to the National Pact and Mosul in a speech before the Grand National Assembly. According to him, Turkey's national borders began south of Iskenderun and extended east, including Mosul, Sulaymaniyah, and Kirkuk. The British were concerned that Mustafa Kemal Pasha would target Mosul after defeating the Greeks. Tribes in the Revandiz region asked for help from the Ankara government for their rebellion against the British, and Ankara sent a company of three officers and 100 privates to Mosul; on 9 August 1921, Major Şevki Bey was appointed as the commander of Sulaymaniyah. This force was ordered to avoid conflict with the British unless necessary. Despite this order, the company united with the forces of Revandiz Turkmen and raided the British whenever the opportunity arose. Babaçiçek suffered great losses in the strait to the British, who attacked Revandiz with a large force with air support on 16 December 1921.

=== The Özdemir expedition ===
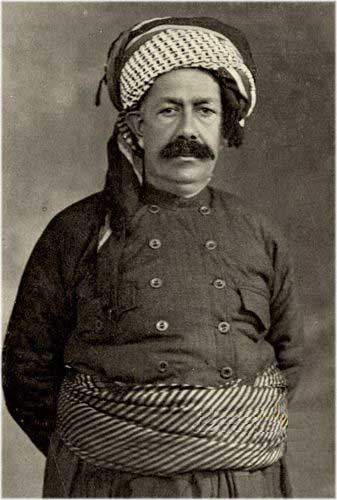
A photo of Mahmud Barzanji

As the attacks by the British against Erbil and Revandiz increased in January 1922, Mustafa Kemal Pasha ordered a militia unit to be sent to Mosul. The General Staff focused on the appointment of a commander who knew the local terrain, tribal relations, traditions, and banditry. They appointed Militia Lieutenant Colonel Şefik Özdemir Bey, who was the commander of the National Forces in Antep, to the position. Mustafa Kemal, as speaker of the Ankara government, delivered a personal instruction to Özdemir, ordering him to undertake the mission as a private individual for the sake of legal fiction.

Özdemir Bey organized a successful insurgency in the Mosul region. Departing from Ankara to Revandiz with a skeleton staff, he hoped to recruit Turkish and tribal soldiers loyal to the Turkish administration. He also sought Tunisian and Algerian soldiers who escaped from the French army in Nizip and took refuge with the Turks. Özdemir arrived in Diyarbakır on 22 April, where he met with Al Jazira Front commander Cevat Pasha. The detachment reached Revandiz on 22 June 1922 and was welcomed by the residents. Festivities were held, and nearby tribes came to the city to greet Özdemir and the detachment. Özdemir established a government in the region and acted in line with the general wishes of the people. The Revandizians, who had been without a functioning government, accepted Özdemir as the representative of Mustafa Kemal Pasha, affectionately calling him Özdemir Pasha.

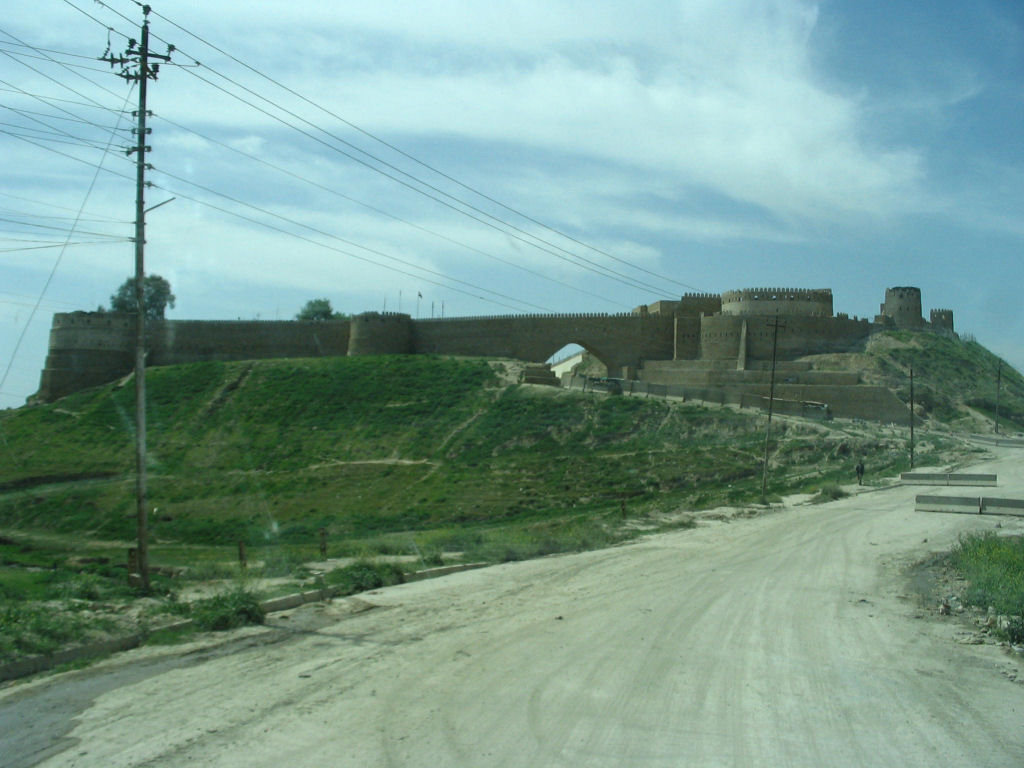
Tal Afar Castle, 2007.

Özdemir Bey expanded his control into the Lahijan region to the south of Lake Urmia. Defense of Law Associations founded by Turks emerged and began to conduct activities in the open. After taking control in Revandiz, Özdemir Bey tried to increase his influence in centers such as Kirkuk, Sulaymaniyah, Akra, and Mosul. In addition to providing a communication network with the telegraph line drawn from Revandiz to Diyarbakır, control was gained in the Akra, Ranya, Erbil, and Köysancak regions, making use of the tribes in the region. Seeing that Turkish influence was increasing, the British attacked Revandiz with 12 planes on 10 July 1922 but were unsuccessful. Özdemir's troops, who completed their supplies in the region, attacked the British on 31 August 1922. Özdemir Bey's platoon won the Battle of Derbent despite British air superiority, shooting down four British planes and capturing six machine guns, two cannons, and supplies in exchange for fourteen killed.

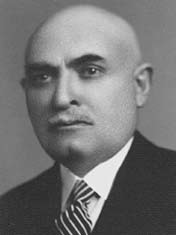
Şefik Özdemir Bey

=== The Mosul operation ===
On 7 September 1922, Chief of General Staff Fevzi Pasha (Çakmak) ordered that Mosul be taken by arms if necessary. The Al Jazira Front was ordered to attack from both sides of the Tigris towards Mosul. The Eastern Front was tasked with attacking Mosul-Kirkuk via the Imadiye and Suleymaniye lines. Fevzi and Kâzım Pasha assembled an infantry division reinforced by mountain batteries – composed of Van, Hakkari, and Iğdır border units – a cavalry brigade including tribal forces, and an aircraft squadron – consisting of reconnaissance and war planes. A telegram sent from Özdemir to the Al Jazira Front Command on 6 November 1922 proposed that after the reinforcements reached Revandiz, they would take Zakho, and then one branch would descend on Dohuk from the south, while the other branch would march on Imadiye. Within the framework of the answers received, Özdemir was ordered to complete the necessary preparations for the Al Jazira Front by 10 November 1922.

The British started bombing Köysancak, İmadiye, and Dinart from the air on 17 October 1922. The issue that attracted the most attention among the efforts of the Turkish General Staff of the Al Jazira front was reinforcing aircraft divisions.

=== Conclusion ===
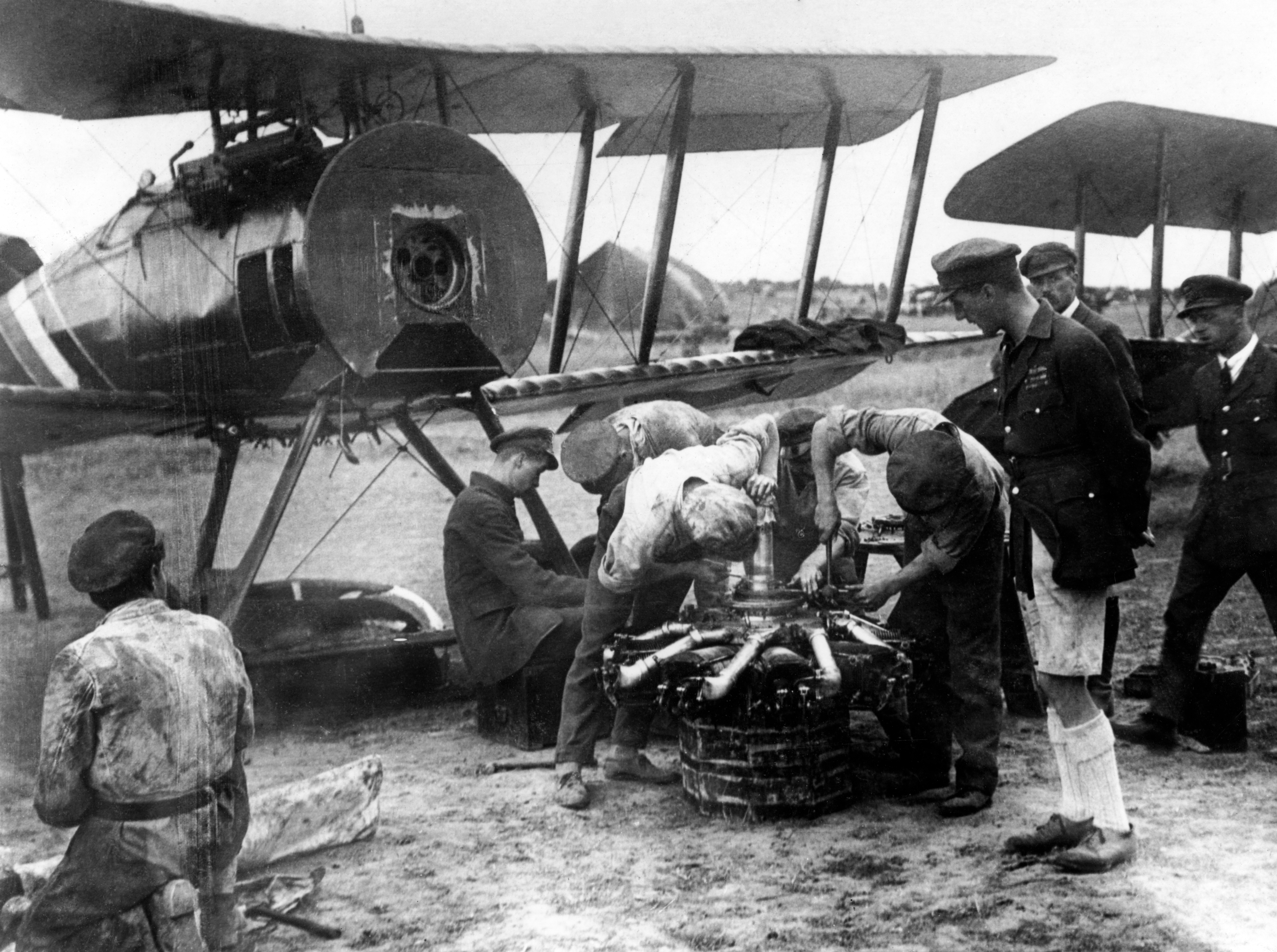
British pilots of 203 Squadron in Gallipoli in 1922.

While these developments were taking place, the Lausanne Conference was underway. The Mosul question was a contentious issue for the conference. In his statements in the Grand National Assembly on 2 January and 30 January 1923, Mustafa Kemal Pasha stated that the province of Mosul was within the national borders of the Turkish state. He stated that it would not be possible to separate the region from the motherland and give them as gifts to others. There was a possibility that the conference would collapse, whereupon the Mosul operation would commence. Kemal's statements about Mosul and his request for a plebiscite mobilized the locals against the British. The British aircraft fleet bombarded cities, tribal areas, their herds, and cultivated areas. This aggression angered the locals of the region. British air attacks continued intermittently until February and March 1923. With negotiations in Lausanne going well, the Turkish government requested the planned military operation against Mosul be shelved, where it was hoped the city could be retaken through diplomacy later.

In his report sent to the front command on 5 April 1923, Özdemir Bey asked for a ceasefire to be signed with the British so the Revandiz region would remain under Turkish control. He stated that he did not find the diplomatic movement initiated appropriate in this situation. While the Lausanne negotiations were continuing, British-Iraqi troops in Mosul took forward action again in two directions on 8 April 1923, one towards the Devil's Strait via the Hodran River and the other towards Serderya from the Great Zap River Valley. The British suffered casualties with the raids carried out by Özdemir Bey's detachment on the night of 11/12 April. On the night of 20/21 April, the battle between Özdemir Bey's detachment and the British became even more intense. Unable to hold their own against the British, the detachment withdrew to Iranian territory on 23 April 1923. Özdemir Bey's detachment crossed the steep mountains and reached the town of Ushnu in Iran with its weapons on 29 April 1923. Özdemir Bey asked for his asylum to be accepted in the letter he sent to Yusuf Han, the Iranian military officer in the Savcıbulak area. Özdemir Bey and his platoon entered Turkey from Van's Bahçesaray district on 10 May 1923. The military operation, which was initiated to achieve the National Pact goals, did not yield the expected results due to the lack of necessary support.

== Actions against British troops in Anatolia ==
=== Black Sea Region ===
On 9 March 1919, when 15th Division Commander Mustafa Asım Bey and Samsun Governor İbrahim Ethem Bey declared martial law in the city, the city was occupied by a 200-man British military detachment, citing the terms of the Armistice of Mudros. Some 150-person Australian and New Zealand Army Corps arrived later and settled in the barracks, while some settled in the Samsun Sultani building. Şefik Avni Pasha, who came to Samsun on 7 May 1920, assumed the command of the 15th Division, and the division was rearmed with the help of the Grand National Assembly. Under pressure by the 15th Division, British and French troops had to withdraw.

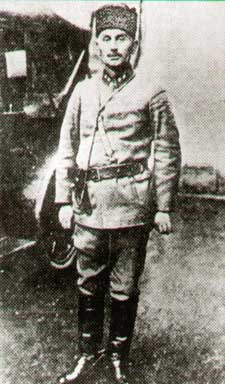
Topal Osman, the leader of the 15th Division.

=== Eskişehir ===
British forces occupied Eskişehir railway station on 23 January 1919 to inspect the railway line after World War I. Kuva-yi Milliye forces led by Ali Fuat Pasha (Cebesoy) ended the occupation on 20 March 1920.

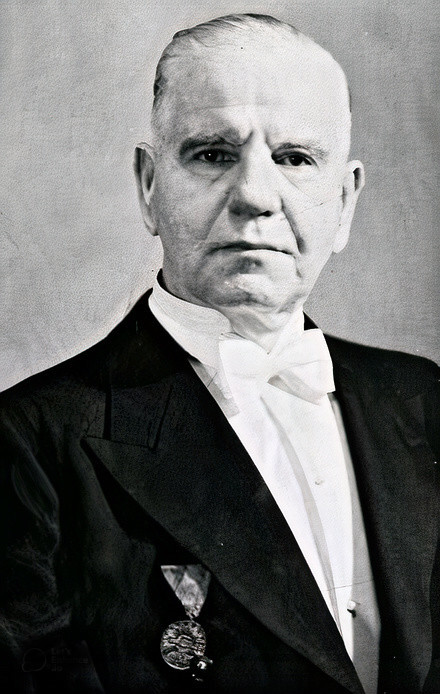
Ali Fuat Pasha (1882–1968)

== Anglo-Turkish belligerency outside the battlefield ==
=== British diplomatic actions against the Turks ===
==== Greece ====
During the Greco-Turkish War, the British government supported Greece against the Turks diplomatically and financially. During the Paris Peace Conference, Eleftherios Venizelos made territorial demands from Anatolia at the conference. He used the propaganda, his oratory skills, and ethnographic maps (some unreliable) to justify his demands. Venizelos was supported by British Prime Minister David Lloyd George, despite the objections of some British statesmen and military administrators. According to Lloyd George, for geopolitical reasons, England had to support Greece to fill the power vacuum that would arise in the Eastern Mediterranean with the collapse of the Ottoman Empire at the end of the First World War. As a result of Lloyd George's support, the Supreme Council at the Paris Conference allowed Greece to invade Western Anatolia on May 6.

The British and French governments promised to send the Greeks 850,000,000 golden francs. With King Constantine's ascension in Greece and heavy losses in Cilicia, the French stopped supporting Greece shortly after the Battle of Kütahya-Eskişehir. The British government was also uneasy about the fall of Venizelos, which came with Constantine's elevation. In return for not liquidating some Venizelist officers, the British continued supporting Greece and its campaign into Inner Anatolia.

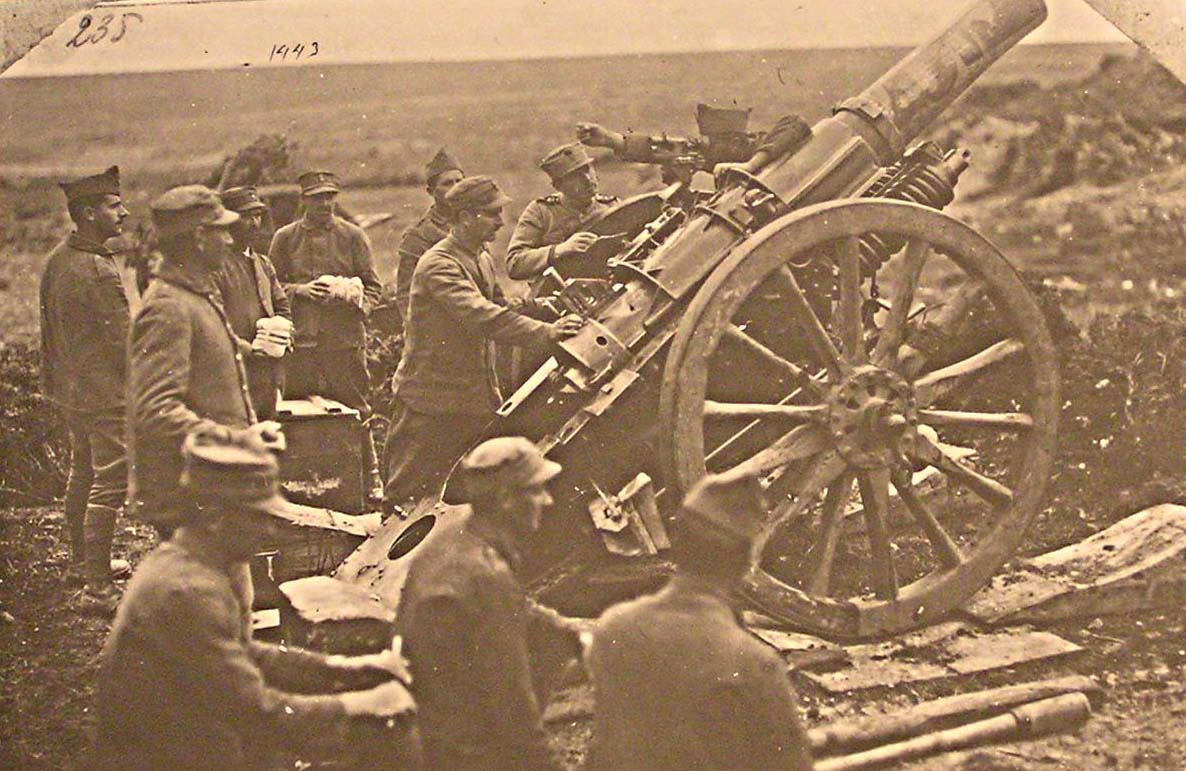
The British-made BL 6-inch 30 cwt howitzer is in the service of the Greeks during Second Battle of İnönü.

The British government supplied Greeks with Airco DH.9s, Sopwith Camel F.1s, and Gotha WD.13 seaplanes. Most of the Greek operations (Greek Summer Offensive, Second Battle of İnönü, etc.) were carried out with British support. On 17 February 1920, Lord Curzon wrote to Admiral John de Robeck that he had "given the necessary order for the Greek army to attack the Turks." In Toynbee's words, the Greeks were equipped with never-used weapons given by the British and French. The amount of British aid to Greece between 1914 and 1920 exceeded 16 million pounds. As there were no cannon or rifle factories in Greece, most of the weapons and ammunition used by the Greek army were supplied by English arms corporations. Before the Battle of Sakarya, the Bank of England opened a short-term credit to Greece. The British supplied the Greek army with 6-inch howitzers in the Second Battle of İnönü. The British Empire also supported Greeks with winter equipment.

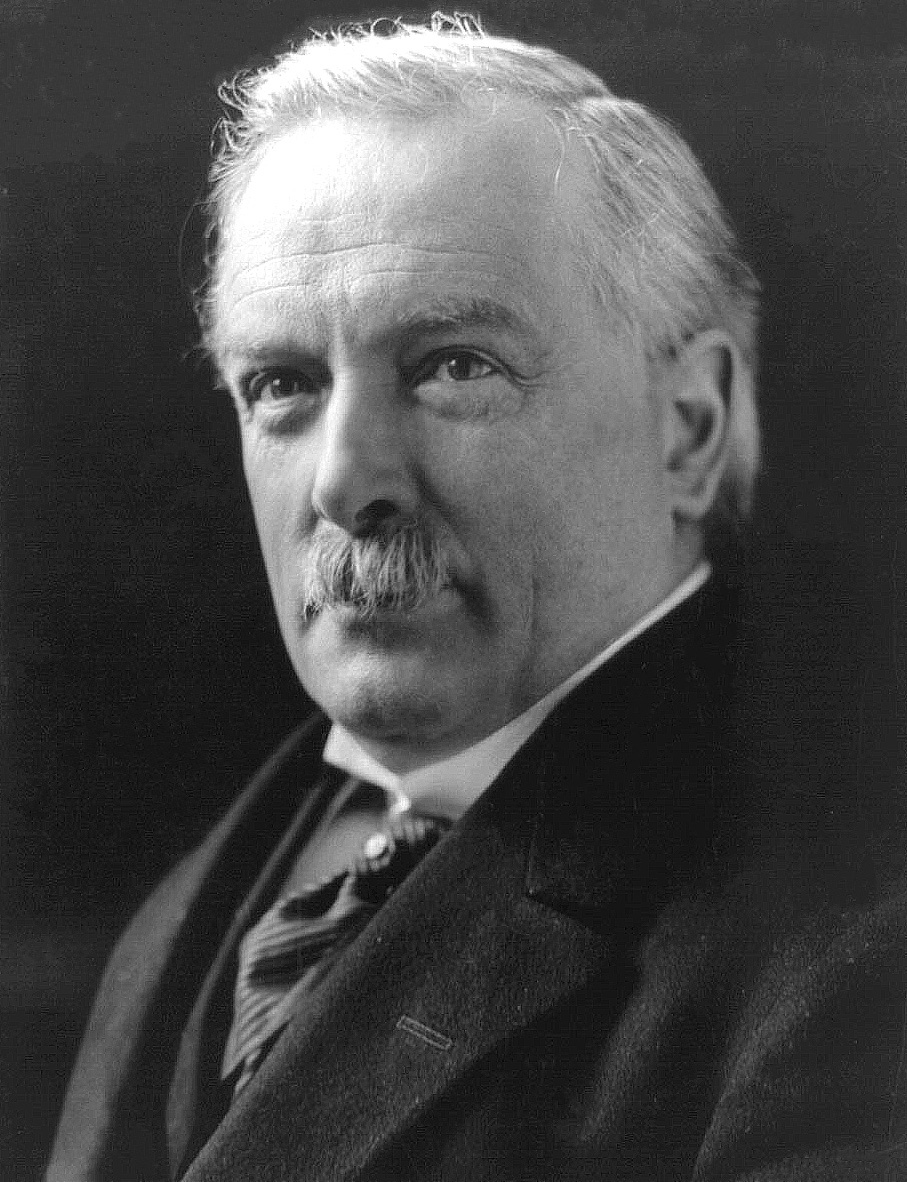
David Lloyd George, pro-Greek British Prime Minister who supported Greeks against Turks in the Turkish War of Independence.

==== Ottoman Empire/Kuva-yi Inzibatiye ====
During the Battle of Geyve (15–17 May 1920), Britain supported the creation of the Caliphate army, led by Ahmet Anzavur, against the Turkish Kuva-yi Milliye, which was led by Ali Fuat Pasha. According to Philip Jowett, the British supported the Caliphate Army with uniforms and guns.

=== Turkish diplomatic actions against the British Empire ===
==== Turkish–Armenian War ====
According to the Armistice of Mudros, the Ottoman Caucasus had to demobilize. The British supported the newly declared Armenian Republic in their military campaign to take Armenian-majority cities in the Ottoman Empire. 40,000 rifles were sent to the Armenian army.

According to the Treaty of Sèvres, which the Ankara government did not recognize, the Armenians were awarded Kars, Ardahan, and Muş. The Turks launched a campaign against Armenia between 24 September and 2 December, which concluded with the Treaty of Alexandropol. According to the treaty, the Armenians had to hand over their arms and munitions, including the 40,000 British rifles. Mustafa Kemal Pasha wrote a letter to Lloyd George, thanking him for the rifles.

==== Treaty of Moscow ====
The Ankara government was dealing with Armenians in the east, French and French-backed Armenian legions in the south, Greeks in the west, Pontic rebels in the north, and British in Southeastern Anatolia, as well as uprisings instigated by the Istanbul government. The Russian Bolsheviks were similarly fighting Allied interventions and uprisings across the former Russian Empire. As they were fighting common enemies, Ankara and Moscow reproached each other following the First Battle of İnönü. The Bolsheviks and Turkish Nationalists signed the Treaty of Moscow. According to the treaty, the Bolsheviks supplied 10,000,000 rubles and arms to Ankara for 800 tons of grain and diplomatic recognition. Thus, these two states supported each other against the British.

==== Afghanistan ====
The Turkish delegation in Moscow also encountered an Afghan delegation with a similar mission. The two states signed a defensive alliance and mutual assistance treaty against the British, who had just concluded a war with Afghanistan while supporting the Greeks in their war against the Turks.

== Turkish and British propaganda campaigns ==
During the Turkish War of Independence, both the British and the Turks used propaganda.

=== British propaganda against the Turks ===
==== The Turkish Nationalist–İttihadist conspiracy ====
According to Doğan Avcıoğlu, a central tension between the United Kingdom and the Ottoman Empire was Pan-Islamism and the Caliphate. The Turks declared a holy war in their jihad against the UK, and they launched a "crusade" against the Turks. British propaganda, both during the First World War and after the Armistice of Mudros, primarily targeted the Committee of Union and Progress cadres and described them as the enemy. The greatest support to Britain came from Damat Ferit Pasha, the Freedom and Accord Party, and elements in the Istanbul government.

At the end of the war, the Allies wanted to capture the leaders of the CUP to try them as war criminals for the Armenian genocide. In the first days of the occupation of Constantinople, some members of the CUP started anti-British propaganda. British documents during the Turkish War of Independence conflated Bolshevism and İttihadism (Unionism). In an attempt to discredit the Turkish National Movement, British propaganda accused them of being a new iteration of the CUP, a sentiment shared by the anti-Unionists.

The British also accused the Turkish nationalists of being Bolsheviks. With this propaganda, the United Kingdom aimed to both remind Europe of the Bolshevik danger and to bolster support for their Turkish allies. This didn't stop Turkish nationalists from using socialist geopolitical outlooks. According to an article without signatures in Hakimiyet-i Milliye, communism represented a war against the British Empire and their global hegemony. The world was divided into two great forces, represented on one side by oppressed nations and on the other side by capitalist nations such as Britain. The Russians were included in the category of oppressed nations.

==== The Turkish Nationalist–Bolshevism conspiracy ====
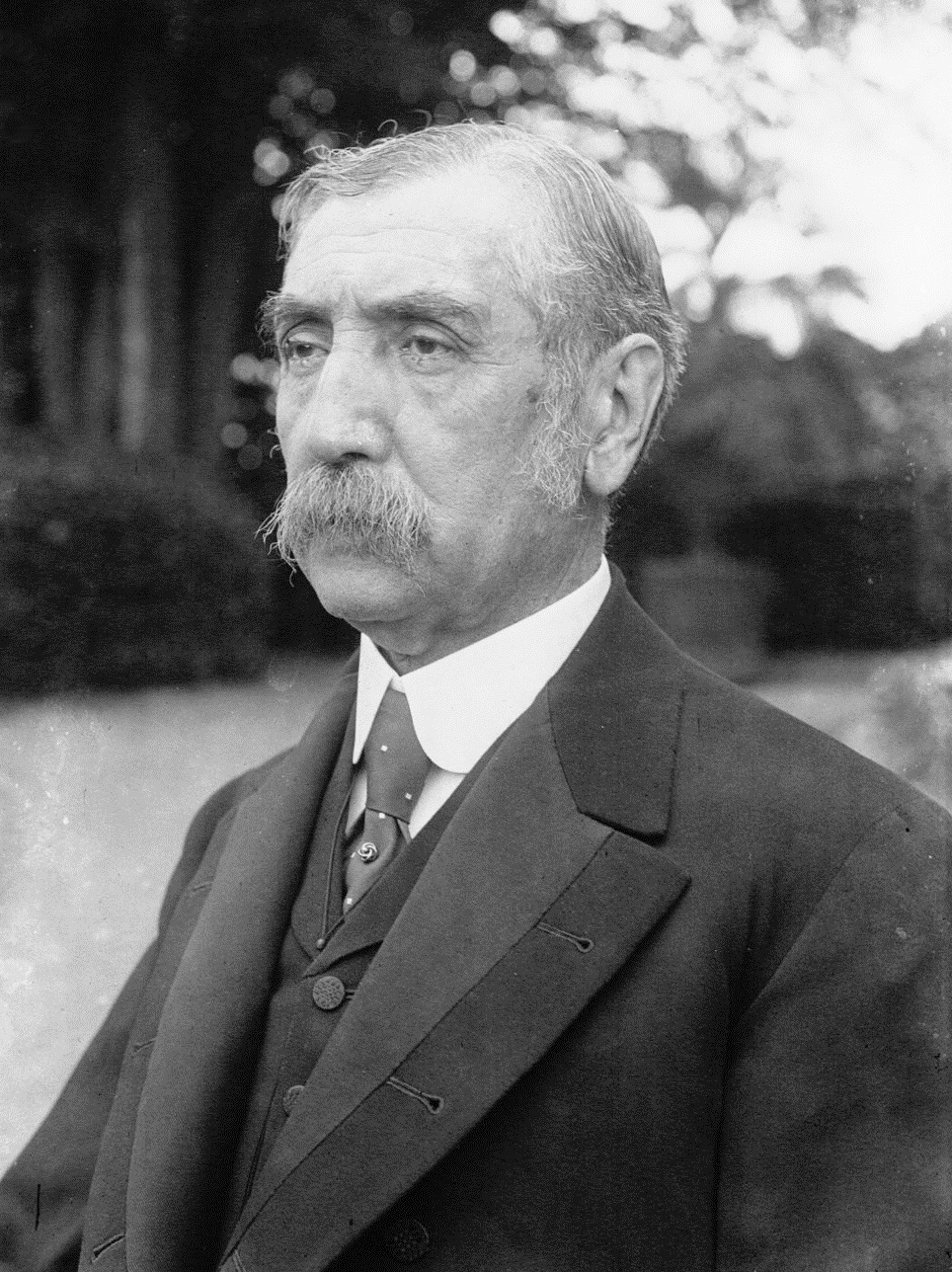
Damad Ferit Pasha, pro-British Ottoman politician and opponent of the Turkish national movement

Mustafa Kemal Pasha, in a 14 August 1920 speech to parliament, stated that he took into account the victimized classes of people, stating, "Our nation, as a whole, is the victim and the oppressed." In some reports in the British National Archives, military intelligence personally testified about the accuracy of this accusation. Units about this topic were reported to London. In the report of the British Military Intelligence Directorate dated 19–20 February 1920:

Bolshevism of Turkish politicians is a national danger. There is ample evidence to show that they understood that the successes of the Bolsheviks were mentioned in Turkish propaganda (...) by Great Britain. It is clear that this was done to emphasize that he was defeated. In this way, Turkish Pan-Islamists can hope to find additional material for anti-allied propaganda.

=== Turkish propaganda against the British ===
==== "The Caliph is Captured" narrative ====
American journalist Clarence K. Streit, who came to Ankara during the War of Independence and interviewed Mustafa Kemal Pasha, says that he did not see any effort to incite religious bigotry in Ankara's propaganda. Streit said that the only issue in which religious sentiment was invoked was to remind the villagers that "the Caliph is a prisoner in British hands and must be rescued as soon as possible".

==== "The Real Enemy of Our Struggle is the British" narrative ====
One of the important topics of the Ankara government's propaganda was to instill the idea of 'England as the Real Enemy' into society. This was made easier because there was already anti-British sentiment because of the First World War. Since the day of the arrival of the Allied Navy to Constantinople, this reaction gradually increased. Sunata explains one of the reasons for this in his memoirs by saying that among the victorious states that occupied Istanbul, the British showed the most "hostility" towards the Turks.
