= William Bell (field preacher) =

17th-century Scottish preacher

Religious life
- Religion: Christianity
- School: Presbyterianism
- Profession: minister

Fields by the Pentland Hills

William Bell was a field preacher and 17th century minister.

He was apprehended at Pentland while in the discharge of his duty, 4 September 1676. A number of the hearers were also apprehended. While they were carried up the West Bow at Edinburgh, along with Robert Dick, an unsuccessful attempt was made at a rescue, and all were imprisoned. The indictment he was answering for, was "preaching and discharging the other functions of the ministry without a regular licence." He was tried for preaching sermons in the open air for "by the fifth act of the second session of the second Parliament of Charles II, 1670, it is statute and ordained, "that whosoever without licence or authority shall preach, expound scripture, or pray at any meetings in the field, or in any house where there are more persons than the house contains, so that some of them are without doors (which is declared to be a house conventicle), or who shall convocate any number of people to these meetings, shall be punished with death, and confiscation of their goods.""

He was sent to the Bass Rock on the Firth of Forth in Haddingtonshire on 12 October 1676 along with Robert Dick. He was released on 19 July 1679 after nearly three years.

From September 1679 until April 1680 it is recorded that conventicles were held in the town-barn of the earl of Tweedale at Innerkeithing. William Bell is listed as one of the preachers. Bell was subsequently imprisoned in Blackness Castle.
