= William Bell (Canadian businessman, born 1806) =

William Bell (1 May 1806 – 4 August 1844) was a businessman and militia officer from Perth, Upper Canada.

William Bell had a twin brother, John and was the son of William Bell, a Presbyterian missionary, who had arrived in Perth from Scotland in 1817.

William and his brother both apprenticed in the mercantile trade before forming a partnership and opening a store at Perth in 1828. They also opened a store at Carleton Place with another brother, Robert. The aggressive merchandising style at the Perth store caused ill feelings amongst their competition. The most notable reaction was from William Morris with whom William had been apprenticed. The bad feeling ultimately divided Perth's Presbyterian congregation where their father was the minister.
