= William Bell (MP for Carlisle) =

English politician

William Bell (fl. 1416) was an English politician. He sat as MP for Carlisle in March 1416.
