= William J. Bell (entomologist) =

American entomologist (1943–1998)

William J. Bell (10 January 1943 – 17 October 1998) was an American entomologist, a pioneer of chemical ecology, and professor at the University of Kansas.

Bell was born in Boston, Massachusetts to William and May Bell. He was interested in science and received an undergraduate fellowship from the National Science Foundation and received a BS from Bridgewater State College in 1964 followed by an MS in zoology from the University of Massachusetts-Amherst. He then went to study under William H. Telfer at the University of Pennsylvania and received a Ph.D. in 1969 for studies on the juvenile hormone in egg development. After a post-doctoral at the University of Texas he joined the University of Kansas in 1970 as an assistant professor of entomology. In his laboratory he worked with students on chemosensory perception of insects, innovating methods for experimentation.

Along with Tom Payne he founded the Journal of Insect Behavior in 1988 and was its editor until his death. He published two major books, the Laboratory Cockroach (1981) and co-edited the Chemical Ecology Insects (1984).
