= William Bell (clergyman) =

- Born: May 28, 1780; Scotland, United Kingdom
- Died: August 16, 1857 (aged 77)
- Occupations: Minister, writer
- Children: William Bell; Robert Bell
- Religion: (1) New Licht Burgher Seceder; (2) Presbytery of the Canadas; (3) United Synod of Upper Canada; (4) Synod of the Presbyterian Church of Canada in Connection with the Established Church of Scotland

William Bell (May 28, 1780 – August 16, 1857) was a Presbyterian minister, born in Scotland and an immigrant to Upper Canada.

== Settling in Perth ==
Bell and his family settled in Perth, Upper Canada, in 1817. He was a significant figure in promoting and expanding the Presbyterian faith among the settlers in his region. He assisted in starting congregations in Beckwith Township, Lanark, Smiths Falls and Richmond.

== Diaries about synods and their interactions ==
His carefully constructed diaries and other writings provide an important insight into the interactions between the United Synod of Upper Canada (aligned with the Scottish United Secession Church) and the Synod of the Presbyterian Church of Canada (aligned with the Church of Scotland). In 1835 Bell left the former and joined the latter. The former was absorbed by the latter by 1839. In 1844 a large group withdrew from the latter, and formed a Free Church of Scotland Canadian Synod. However, Bell remained within the Presbyterian Church of Canada in Connection with the Established Church of Scotland.

== Children ==
His son William Bell was a businessman and militia officer who gained some notability in Canadian history. Another son, Robert Bell, was a notable politician in Lanark County.

== See also ==
- List of Canadian writers
- List of diarists
- List of people from Ontario
- List of Scottish writers
