= Billy Bell (footballer) =

English footballer

Personal information
- Full name: William John Bell
- Date of birth: 1904
- Place of birth: Backworth, Northumberland, England
- Position: Outside left

Youth career
- Chopwell Institute

Senior career*
Years	Team	Apps	(Gls)
–1924	Blyth Spartans		
1924	Lincoln City	20	(3)
1924–1925	Mansfield Town		
1925–1929	Leicester City	41	(5)
1930–1931	Torquay United	28	(6)
- * Club domestic league appearances and goals

William John Bell (born 1904, date of death unknown) was an English professional footballer who played as an outside left. He was born in Backworth, Northumberland.

Bell began his career with Chopwell Institute, later moving to Blyth Spartans. In 1923, he had an unsuccessful trial with Aston Villa and the following year joined Lincoln City. He scored 3 times in 20 league games for Lincoln before joining non-league Mansfield Town.

In 1925, he joined Leicester City, playing 41 times (5 goals) over the next five years before joining Torquay United in 1930. He started the season as first choice on the wing for Torquay, but lost his place due to the emergence of the future England international Ralph Birkett in the side. Bell scored 6 times in 28 league games, with a further goal in four FA Cup ties that season, which was to be his only at Torquay and his last in league football.
