= Billy Bell (Canadian football) =

Canadian football player (1923–2019)

Profile
- Position: Halfback

Personal information
- Born: October 14, 1923; Yarmouth, Nova Scotia, Canada
- Died: November 24, 2019 (aged 96); Barrie, Ontario, Canada

Career history
- 1945–1947: Toronto Argonauts

Awards and highlights
- 3× Grey Cup champion (1945, 1946, 1947)

William Hamilton Bell (October 14, 1923 – November 24, 2019) was a Canadian professional football player who played for the Toronto Argonauts, mostly as a back-up halfback and quarterback. He won the Grey Cup with them in 1945, 1946 and 1947.
