= William Yancy Bell =

American bishop (1887–1962)

William Yancy Bell (or William Yancey Bell) (February 23, 1887 – April 10, 1962) was an American bishop. He received a Ph.D. from Yale University in 1924 was a sometime follower of Marcus Garvey and became a bishop of the Christian Methodist Episcopal Church c. 1933.

At Yale he specialized in the Department of Semitic Languages and Letters.

Dr. Bell was very active in civil rights issues as evidenced by his being a member of a Negro delegation to visit President Harry Truman to get him to integrate the U.S. Armed Forces. He worked with W. E. B. Dubois and ordained Martin Luther King Jr. on January 17, 1942, when King was 13 years old.
